= Carl McAdams =

American football player (born 1944)

No. 50
- Positions: Defensive tackle, Defensive end, Linebacker

Personal information
- Born: April 26, 1944 (age 82); Dumas, Texas, U.S.
- Listed height: 6 ft 3 in (1.91 m)
- Listed weight: 240 lb (109 kg)

Career information
- High school: White Deer (White Deer, Texas)
- College: Oklahoma (1962-1965)
- NFL draft: 1966: 1st round, 8th overall pick
- AFL draft: 1966: 3rd round, 22nd overall pick

Career history
- Waterbury Orbits (1967); New York Jets (1967–1969)

Awards and highlights
- Super Bowl champion (III); AFL champion (1968); Consensus All-American (1965); First-team All-American (1964); 2× First-team All-Big Eight (1964, 1965)

Career AFL statistics
- Fumble recoveries: 2
- Sacks: 3
- Stats at Pro Football Reference

Carl McAdams (born April 26, 1944) is an American former professional football player who was a linebacker for the New York Jets of the American Football League (AFL) from 1967 through 1969. He played college football for the Oklahoma Sooners, earning consensus All-American honors in 1965. He was an integral part of the AFL and Super Bowl-champion Jets in 1968. When McAdams signed with the Jets, it was the largest contract for a lineman until that point.
