= National Register of Historic Places listings in Carson County, Texas =

Location of Carson County in Texas

This is a list of the National Register of Historic Places listings in Carson County, Texas.

This is intended to be a complete list of properties and districts listed on the National Register of Historic Places in Carson County, Texas. There are four properties listed on the National Register in the county. Two of these properties are also Recorded Texas Historic Landmarks.

This National Park Service list is complete through NPS recent listings posted March 21, 2025.

== Current listings ==
The locations of National Register properties may be seen in a mapping service provided.

| | Name on the Register | Image | Date listed | Location | City or town | Description |
|---|---|---|---|---|---|---|
| 1 | Atchison, Topeka and Santa Fe Railway Depot, Panhandle | Atchison, Topeka and Santa Fe Railway Depot, Panhandle | April 25, 2003 (#03000326) | One Main St. 35°20′28″N 101°22′39″W | Panhandle | Recorded Texas Historic Landmark, now the Panhandle City Hall |
| 2 | Carson County Square House Museum | Carson County Square House Museum | March 7, 1973 (#73001961) | 5th and Elsie Sts. 35°20′46″N 101°22′49″W | Panhandle | Recorded Texas Historic Landmark |
| 3 | Panhandle Inn | | February 28, 2017 (#100000693) | 301 Main St. 35°20′37″N 101°22′48″W | Panhandle | |
| 4 | Route 66, Texas 207 to I-40 | Route 66, Texas 207 to I-40 | April 3, 2007 (#06000924) | Texas Farm Rd. 2161, from I-40 to TX 207; 35°13′21″N 101°30′02″W | Conway | |

== See also ==
- National Register of Historic Places listings in Texas
- Recorded Texas Historic Landmarks in Carson County
