= Grady Hillhouse =

American civil engineer and YouTuber

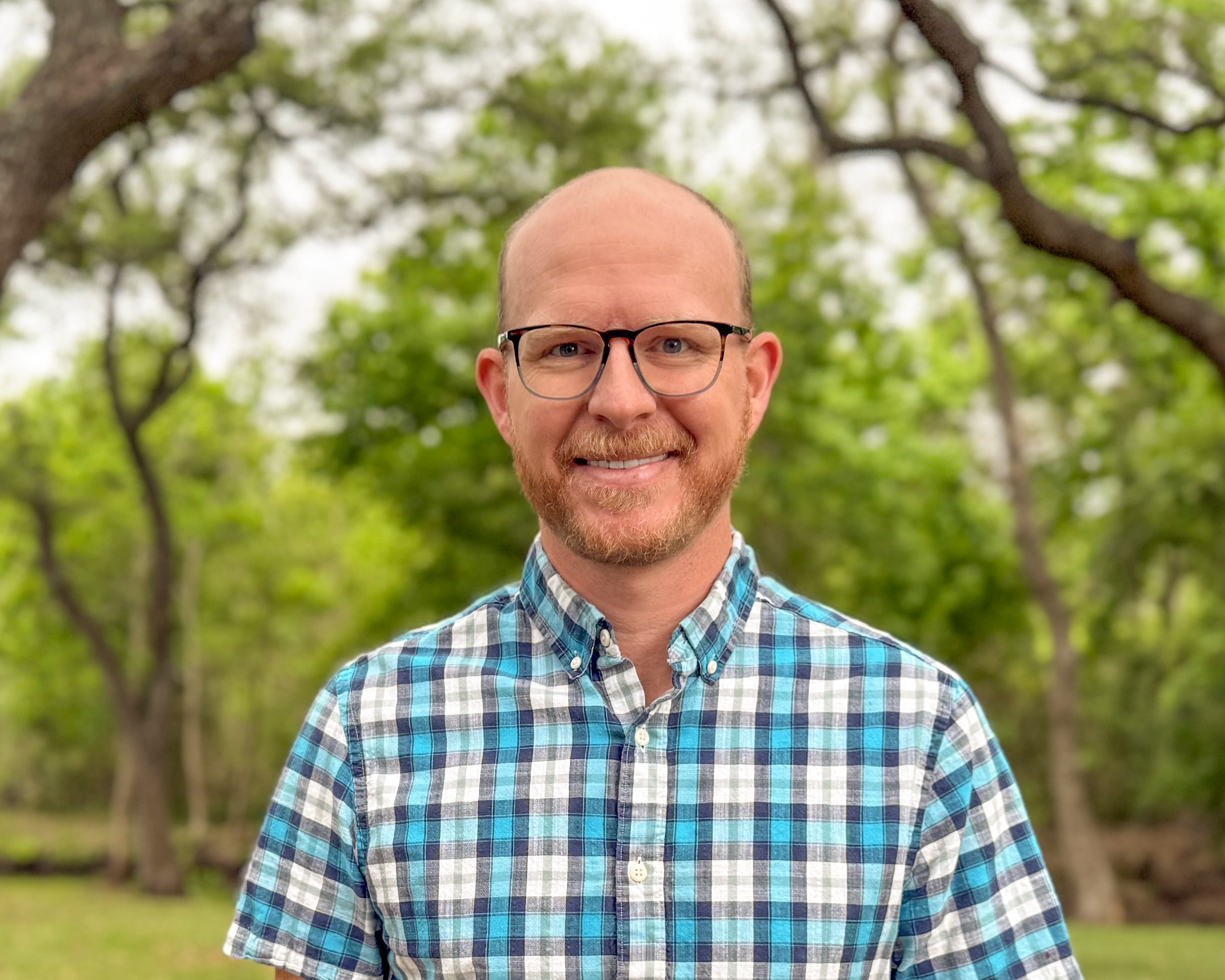
- Born: Grady Hillhouse; Panhandle, Texas, U.S
- Education: Panhandle High School; Texas State University; Texas A&M University
- Occupations: Engineer; author; YouTube personality
- Years active: 2015–present
- Awards: Independent Media Initiative Award

YouTube information
- Channel: Practical Engineering
- Genre: Engineering
- Subscribers: 4.67 million
- Views: 515 million
- Last updated: January 20, 2026
- Website: practical.engineering

Grady Hillhouse is an American author and civil engineer, best known for his YouTube channel Practical Engineering.

== Early life and engineering career ==
Hillhouse is a native of Panhandle, Texas, graduating as high school valedictorian in 2006. He completed an undergraduate degree in geography at Texas State University and master's degree in civil engineering at Texas A&M University in 2012, before working as a professional dam and levee engineer.

== Practical Engineering ==
Hillhouse's YouTube channel Practical Engineering began to address what he described as a lack of "infrastructure literacy" among the general public after a presentation on engineering to his wife's kindergarten class. Within the channel, he discusses civil engineering, infrastructure, and the constructed environment with demonstrations using homebuilt models. Practical Engineering subsequently received significant professional and subscriber attention, and Hillhouse began working on the channel full-time in 2021 with a professional production team.

In 2022, Hillhouse published Engineering in Plain Sight to identify and explain physical infrastructure in the modern world, with positive reactions from both engineering professionals and general readers.

=== Recognition ===
His video 1.5 Years of Heavy Construction in 1.5 Hours won an Independent Media Initiative Award in 2025.

The success of Practical Engineering has also led to Hillhouse presenting his experiences in science communications to professional engineering groups.

== Personal life ==
Hillhouse is married, with a child born in 2020, living and working in San Antonio, Texas.
