= List of Texas State University alumni =

The list of Texas State University alumni includes notable alumni of Texas State University.

== Politics and government ==
- Rosalyn Baker, Hawaii state senator, District 6
- Buddy Garcia, interim 2012 member of the Texas Railroad Commission
- Veronica Gonzales, member of the Texas House of Representatives (2005-2012)
- Lyndon B. Johnson (Class of 1930), 36th US president
- David M. Medina, justice on the Supreme Court of Texas, 2004-2013
- James Oakley, county judge for Burnet County
- John Sharp, Texas A&M University System chancellor
- Dwayne Stovall, businessman in Cleveland, Texas, school board member, and Republican candidate for the United States Senate in the primary election scheduled for March 4, 2014
- Catalina Vasquez Villalpando (attended but did not graduate), US treasurer

== Military ==
- Robert L. Rutherford, former general in the United States Air Force, former commander of United States Transportation Command

== Music ==
- Scott H. Biram, blues, country, rock musician
- Maggie Heath, member of folk rock duo The Oh Hellos
- Terri Hendrix, folk singer-songwriter
- Jamestown Revival
- Emilio Navaira, country/Tejano singer
- Kyle Park, country singer
- Charlie Robison, country singer
- Randy Rogers, country singer
- Tommy Bolton, Dan Buie, Gerry Gibson and Bill Pennington of Roy Head and The Traits, Rockabilly Hall of Fame band members
- George Strait, country singer
- S U R V I V E
- Sunny Sweeney, country singer

== Media ==
- G. W. Bailey, actor
- Powers Boothe, actor
- Thomas Carter, film director
- Aaryn Gries, Big Brother 15 contestant, 8th place
- Edi Patterson, actress
- Chelcie Ross, actor
- Tracy Scoggins, actress
- Taylor Sheridan, writer and director
- Alexis Texas, AVN award winner and pornographic actress
- Julie White, actress

== Journalism and literature ==
- E. R. Bills, author and journalist
- P. Djèlí Clark, writer and historian
- Julian S. Garcia, writer, editor and op-ed writer for San Antonio Express-News, AP News and contributor-editor to ViAztlan: International Journal of Arts and Letters; contributor to Caracol
- Heloise, columnist
- Joe O'Connell, writer, journalist, photographer, and documentarian
- Tomás Rivera, writer
- Meg Turney, Internet news host

== Sports ==
- Charles Austin, Olympic high jump gold medalist
- Joplo Bartu, former NFL player
- Edgar Baumann, Olympic javelin thrower
- Torgeir Bryn, former NBA player
- Ken Coffey, former NFL player
- Wayne Coffey, football player
- Fred Evans, former NFL player
- Kyle Finnegan, MLB pitcher
- Jeff Foster, former NBA player
- Paul Goldschmidt, MLB first baseman
- Donnie Hart, MLB pitcher
- Lance Hoyt, professional wrestler
- A.J. Johnson, former NFL player
- Wade Key, former NFL player
- Tony Levine (born 1972), football coach
- J. L. Lewis, golfer
- Scott Linebrink, former MLB pitcher
- Craig Mager, football player
- David Mayo, football player
- Shawn Michaels, professional wrestler
- Darryl Morris, cornerback, NFL, Indianapolis Colts
- Anicka Newell, pole vaulter
- Jeff Novak, former NFL player
- Ty Nsekhe, former NFL player
- Ricky Sanders, former NFL player
- Carson Smith, pitcher, Major League Baseball, Boston Red Sox
- Darrick Vaughn, former NFL player
- Mitchell Ward, football player
- Bobby Watkins, NFL player
- Spergon Wynn, former NFL player

== Art ==
- Charles Barsotti, cartoonist
- Griffon Ramsey, chainsaw artist

== Education ==
- Light Townsend Cummins, Bryan Professor of History at Austin College in Sherman, Texas; former official State Historian of Texas
- Paul K. Davis, military historian
- F. Ann Millner, Weber State University president
- Amelia Worthington Williams, Texas historian

== Business ==
- Rod Keller, president of Segway Inc.

== Medicine ==
- Michael Glyn Brown, former hand surgeon

== Engineering ==
- Grady Hillhouse, host of the YouTube series Practical Engineering

== Notable alumni gallery ==
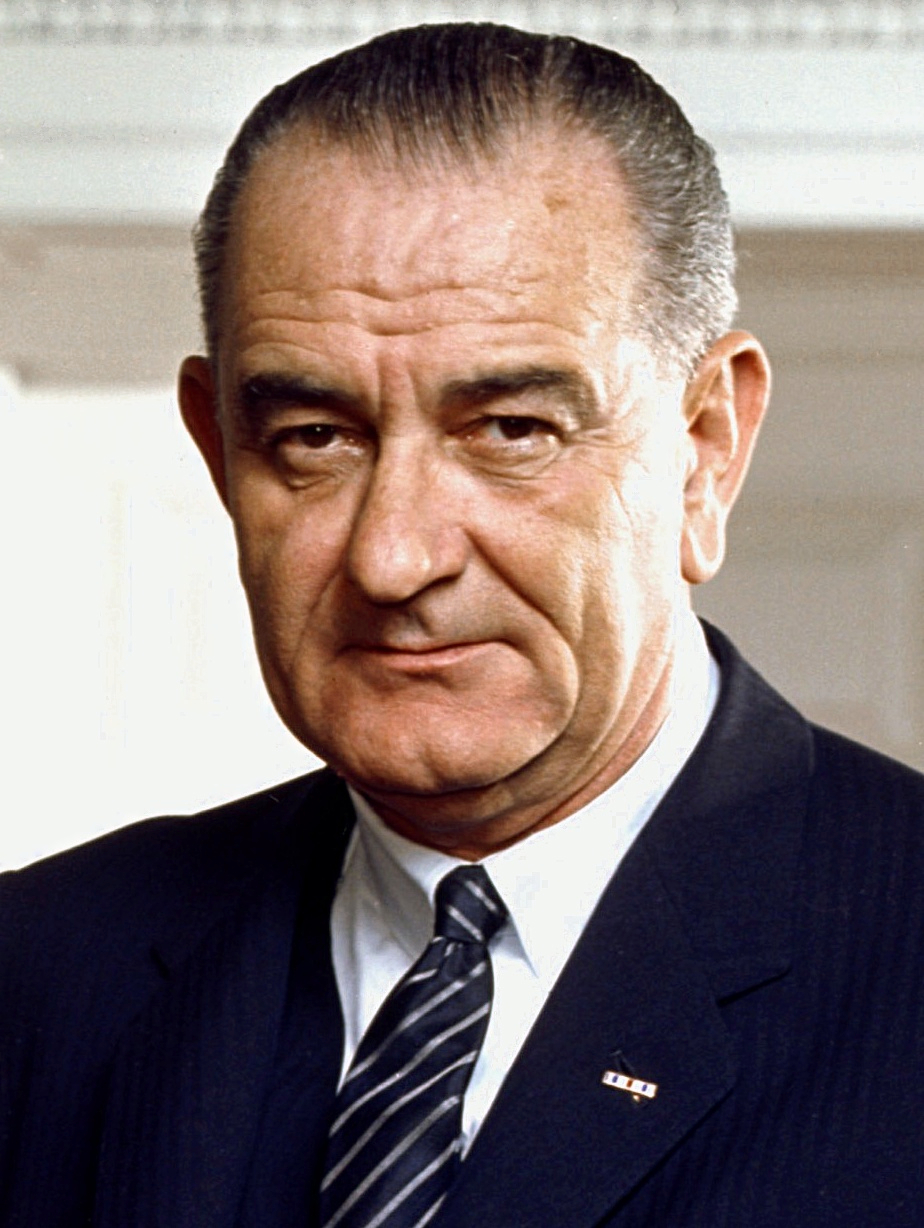
Lyndon B. Johnson, B.Ed. '30

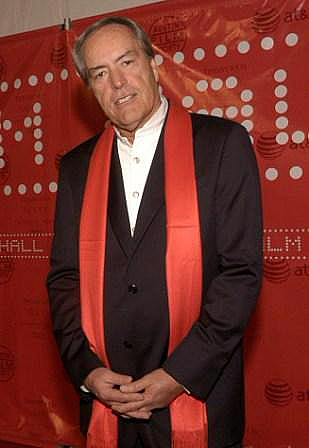
Powers Boothe, B.A. '69

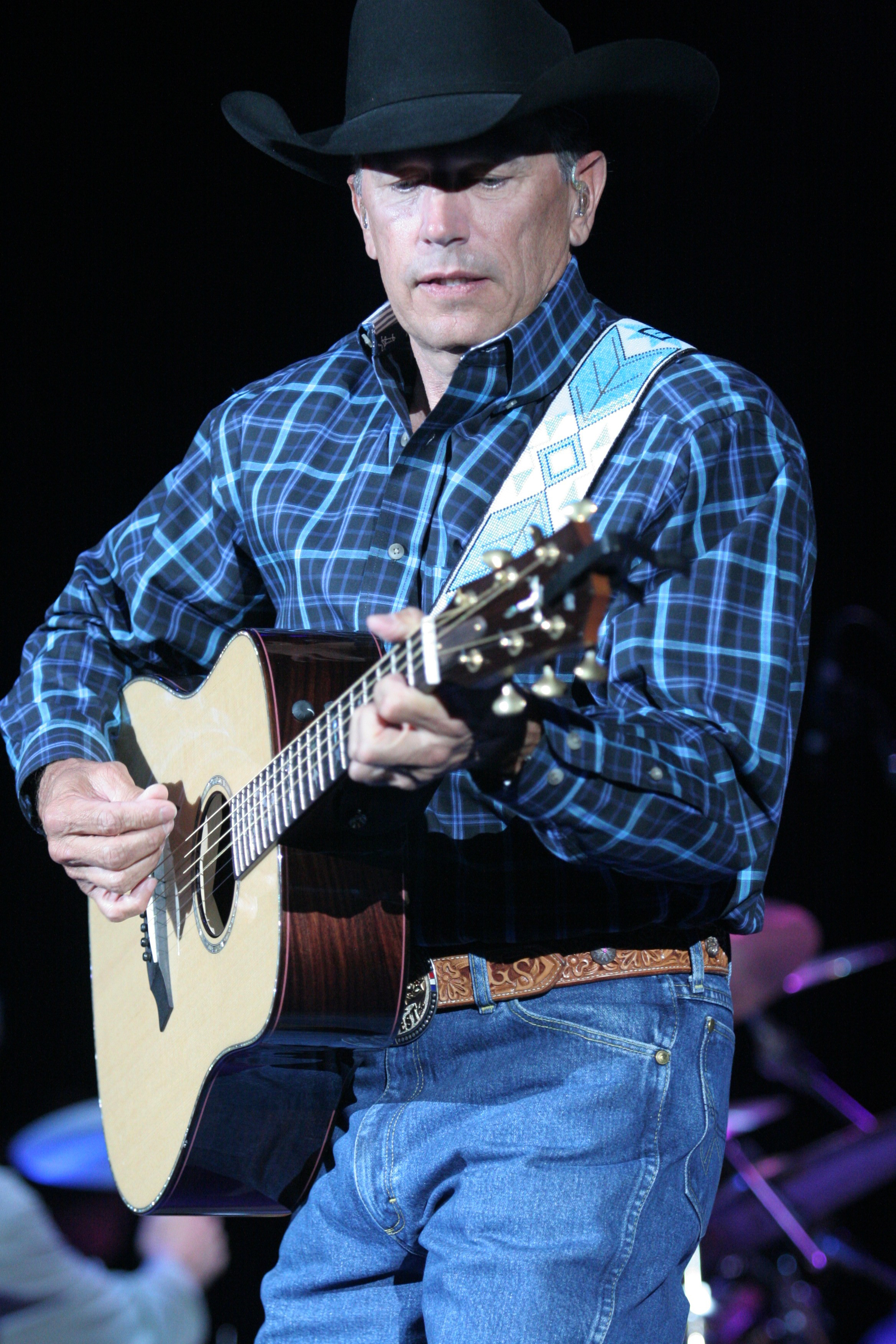
George Strait, B.S. '79, honorary Ph.D. '06

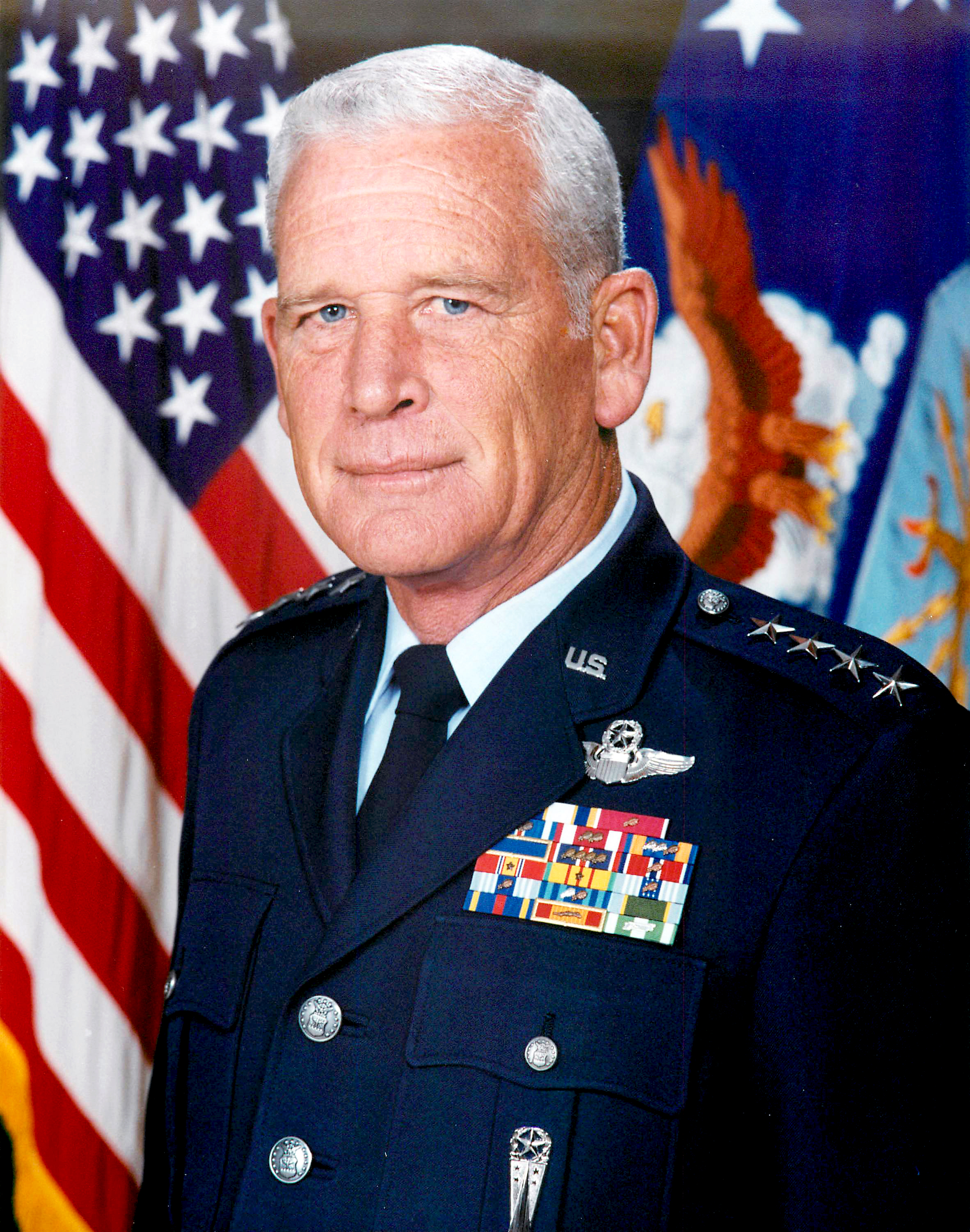
General Robert L. Rutherford, B.B.A. '61
