= Square House Museum =

Square House Museum may refer to

- Carson County Square House Museum NRHP in Panhandle, Texas
- Central Square Station Museum Central Square, New York
- Heritage Square Museum Los Angeles, California
- Heritage Square Museum (New York) Ontario, New York
- Quincy Square Museum Earlville, New York
- Square House Museum (Rye, New York)
- Square House Museum (Tarrytown, New York)

== See also ==
- Maison carrée (French for square house) an ancient Roman building in Nîmes, France.
