= Conway, Texas =

- Unincorporated community
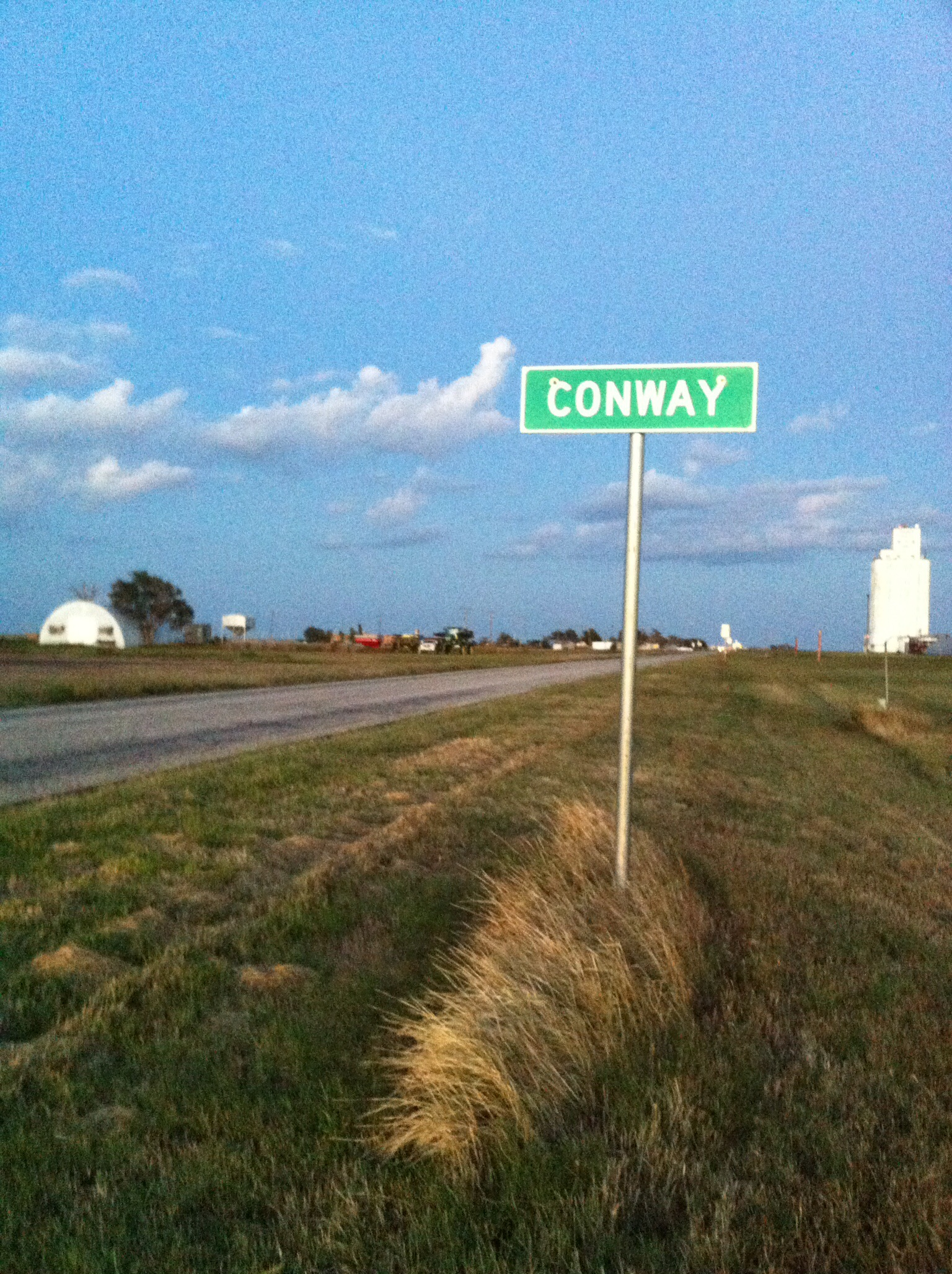
- Entering Conway eastbound on Old US 66

- Location within Texas Location within the United States
- Coordinates: 35°12′28″N 101°22′53″W
- Country: United States
- State: Texas
- County: Carson
- Elevation: 3,458 ft (1,054 m)
- Time zone: UTC-6 (Central (CST))
  - Summer (DST): UTC-5 (CDT)
- Area code: 806
- GNIS feature ID: 1354894

Conway is an unincorporated community in Carson County, Texas, United States. According to the Handbook of Texas, the community had a population of 20 in 2000. It is located within the Amarillo metropolitan area.

== History ==
Conway dates back to its founding in 1892. A post office was established in 1903 and remained in operation until 1976. The Chicago, Rock Island and Gulf Railway's earlier arrival may have served as inspiration for J. D. Delzell and P. H. Fisher's 1905 town plat, which they named in honor of former county commissioner H. B. Conway. In 1907, Edward S. Carr started a mercantile business and took on the role of postmaster. Soon after, a blacksmith shop, grocery store, and train depot were built. A steam-powered threshing machine served local wheat growers. In 1912, a community church that was not sectarian was built. The town established a community club and started an annual community fair in the 1920s. The town's population increased from a low of 25 in 1925 to an estimated 125 in 1939. 175 people were living there in 1969, but by 1970, there were only 50 residents, two grain elevators, four gas stations, three cafes, and a general shop listed. Some of these businesses subsequently closed. In 1990, the population was still 50, but by 2000, it had fallen to 20.

On April 17, 1970, an F4 tornado struck Conway, causing minor damage.

The Eagles Aerodrome was a former airport in Conway.

== Geography ==
Conway is located on Interstate 40 and Texas State Highway 207, 9 mi (14 km) south of Panhandle and 12 mi (19 km) east of Amarillo in southern Carson County.

== Education ==
Lone Star School, one of the first in the Texas Panhandle, was established in Conway in 1892 and served the children of local farmers. The one-room school building was moved here in 1905. It joined the Panhandle Independent School District in 1943 and the original school building became a community center.

== Notable person ==
- Joe Ethridge, NFL player for the Green Bay Packers, was born in Conway.

== See also ==
- U.S. Route 66

== Gallery ==
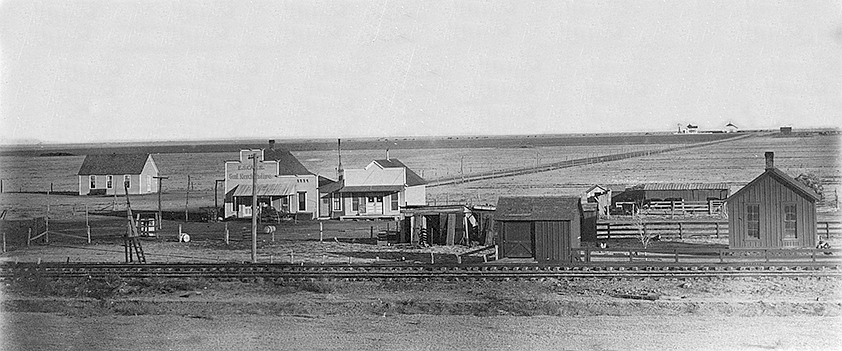
Conway, circa 1909
