= Hamblen Drive =

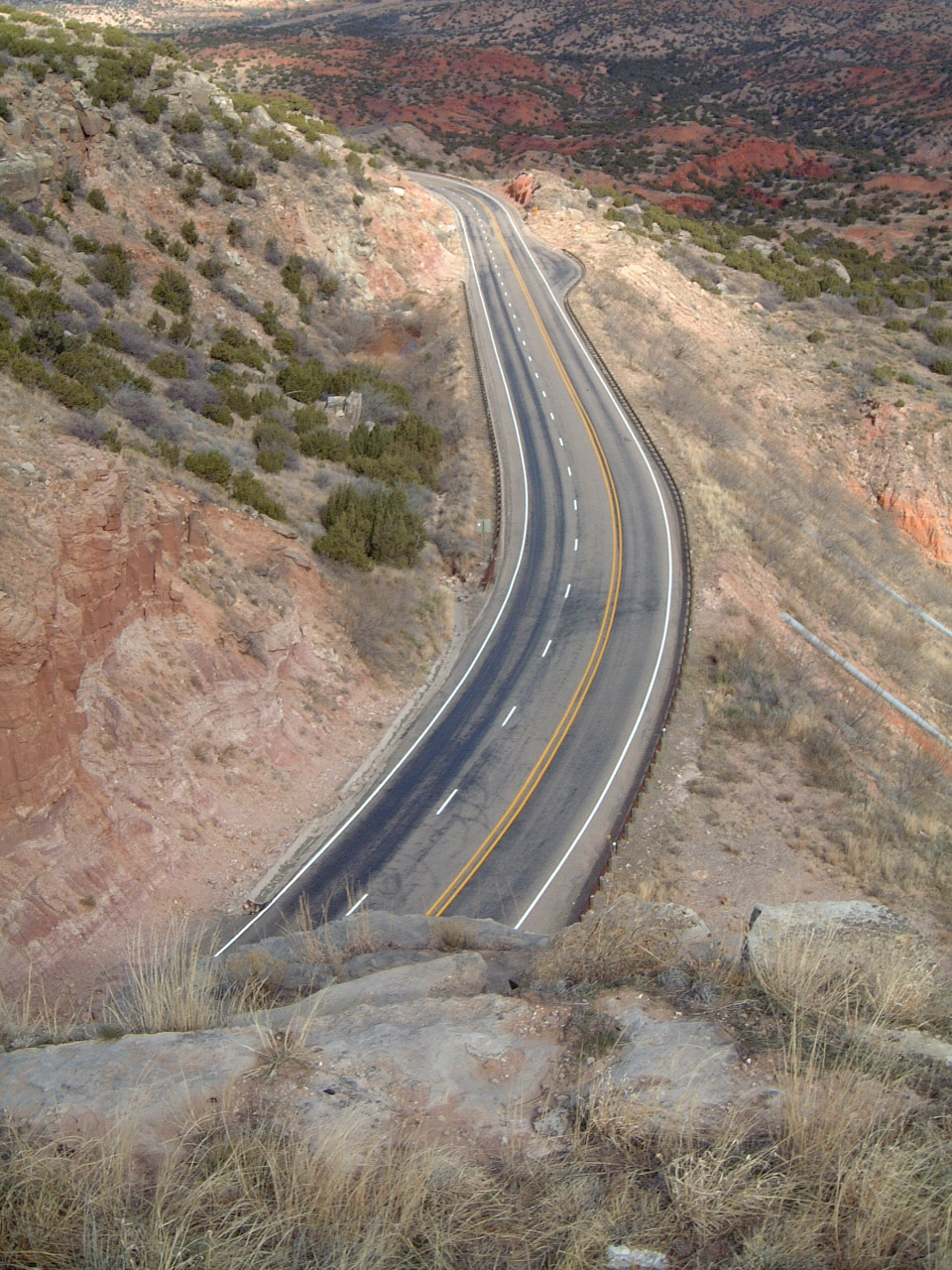
A section of Texas State Highway 207 as seen from the scenic overlook along Hamblen Drive

Hamblen Drive is a scenic road located approximately 20 miles (32 km) south of Claude, Texas, United States, in Armstrong County. Hamblen Drive itself is a section of Texas State Highway 207, which cuts through Palo Duro Canyon and crosses the Prairie Dog Town Fork Red River. The road is named for Will H. Hamblen (1876–1952) ) who, with his family, first moved to the Palo Duro Canyon area in 1890. He married his wife, Ada, in 1900 and together they ranched near Wayside, Texas after 1905.

In the 1890s, Hamblen helped his father haul cedar posts cut from Palo Duro Canyon to Amarillo, Texas to sell for three cents apiece. The journey was made over old Indian trails through the canyon. During these trips Hamblen began to create a crude road, which made it a bit easier to make the trip to Amarillo, and cut approximately 120 miles of the journey to the courthouse in Claude, Texas. This crude road was steep and dangerous, and Hamblen still wanted better roads for the settlers to use. He worked for many years to get a road built through the canyon. In 1928 he was elected county commissioner and a graded road was built. In 1930, the commissioner's court dedicated the road as Hamblen Drive, and paved it in 1954.

In 1968 the State Historical Survey Committee placed a historical marker (marker number 4284) atop a scenic overlook on the cliff of the Palo Duro Canyon. The marker is located at 34° 47.899′ N, 101° 26.16′ W.
