= Carson County Square House Museum =

Historic house in Texas, United States

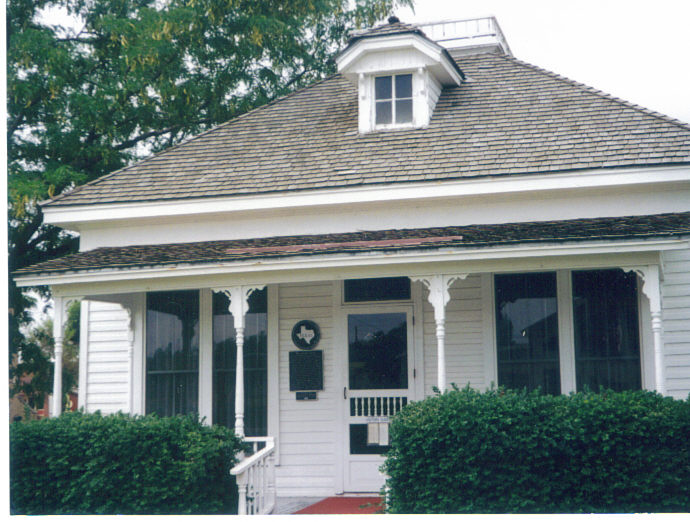
- Square House Museum

- Location within Texas Carson County Square House Museum (the United States)
- Established: 1967
- Location: Elsie St. (SH 207) and Fifth St. Panhandle, Texas
- Coordinates: 35°20′44″N 101°22′50″W
- Website: Square House Museum
- Carson County Square House Museum
- U.S. National Register of Historic Places
- Recorded Texas Historic Landmark
- Area: 0.3 acres (0.12 ha)
- Built: 1887
- NRHP reference No.: 73001961
- RTHL No.: 5023

Significant dates
- Added to NRHP: March 7, 1973
- Designated RTHL: 1966

The Carson County Square House Museum is located at the intersection of Texas State Highway 207 and Fifth Street in the city of Panhandle, in the county of Carson, in the U.S. state of Texas. The structure is a Recorded Texas Historic Landmark, and is on the National Register of Historic Places listings in Carson County, Texas. It is the oldest house in the city.

== Museum ==
This white frame house was built in the late 1880s as a residence for a representative of the Southern Kansas Railway. Lumber to build the home was shipped in from Kansas. It is considered the oldest residence in the city of Panhandle. After a series of several owners, the house became the home of future sheriff Oscar L. Thorp in 1920, and remained a private residence until 1965. On that date, the structure was moved to its current location and restored as a museum.

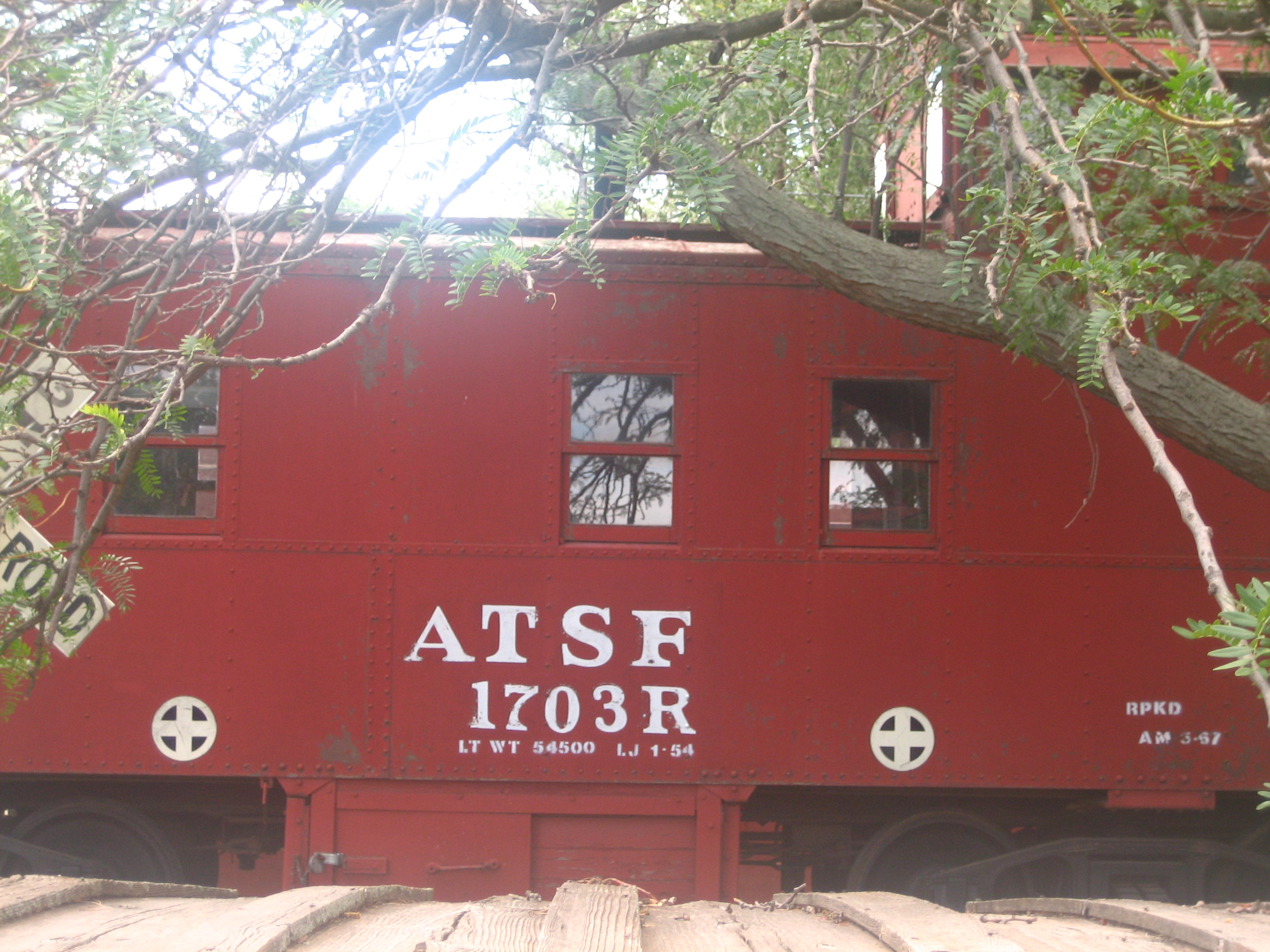
Atchison, Topeka and Santa Fe Railroad, since Burlington Northern Santa Fe

Opening with only the square house in 1967, the complex eventually expanded to include multiple structures. In 1966, the house was designated a Recorded Texas Historic Landmark. The museum was placed on the National Register of Historic Places listings in Carson County, Texas in 1973.

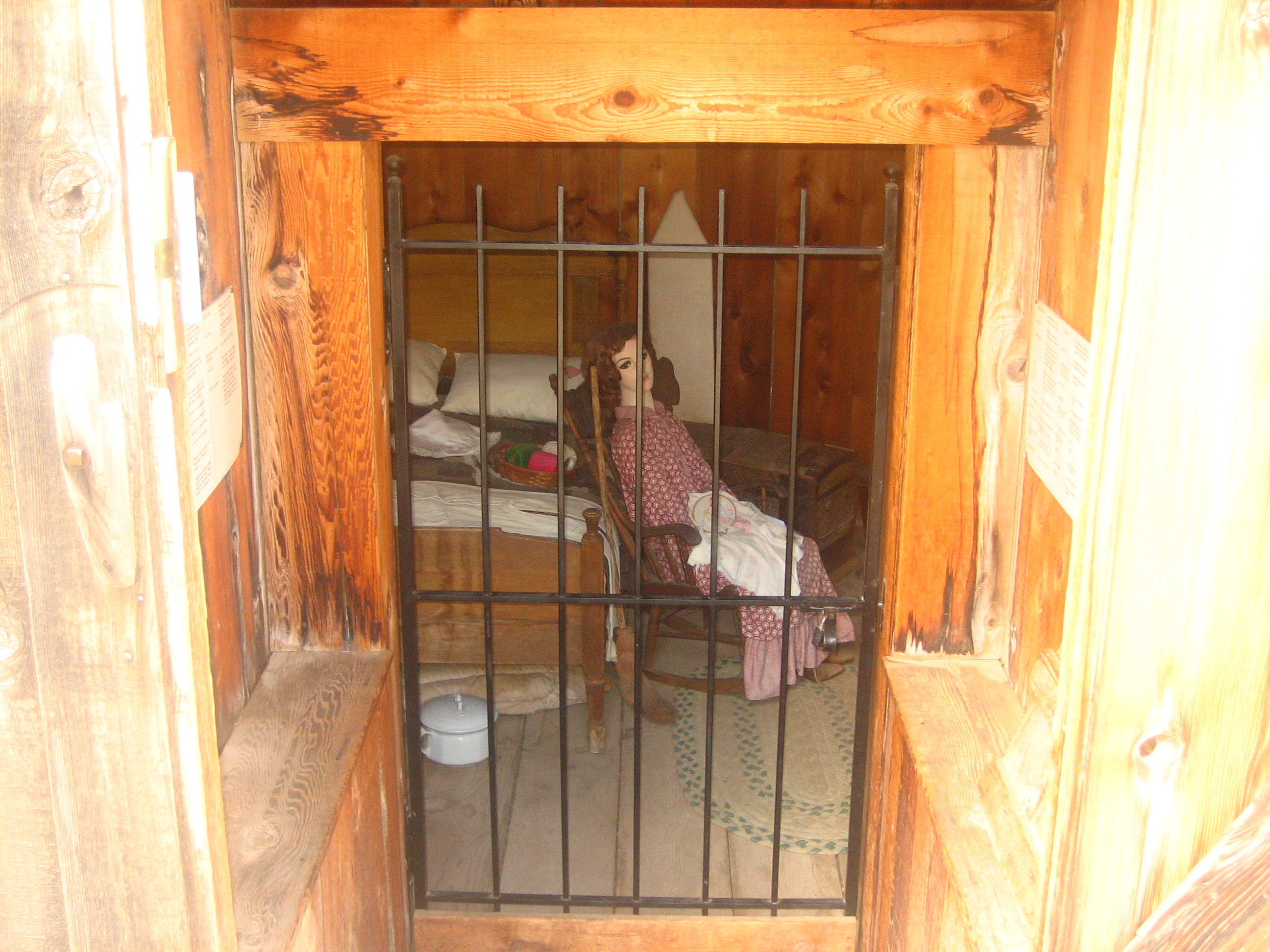
Pioneer dugout

Over 10,000 indoor and outdoor artifacts are on display. Sculpture is on display, as is art by local indigenous tribes. Other structures and exhibits include a train caboose, a windmill, a barn, a dugout shelter and art galleries, all focused on local history and current events Since 1999, Square House Museum has sponsored Line Camp program for young people, two weeks of educational and artistic actives for children ages 7–12.

The museum is entirely funded by Carson County and voluntary donations from the public. It is a member of the Texas Association of Museums.

== See also ==
- National Register of Historic Places listings in Carson County, Texas
- Recorded Texas Historic Landmarks in Carson County
- List of museums in the Texas Panhandle
