= Engineering in Plain Sight =

2022 book

- Author: Grady Hillhouse
- Original title: Engineering in Plain Sight: An Illustrated Field Guide to the Constructed Environment
- Language: English
- Genre: Non-fiction, Civil engineering, Reference work
- Publisher: No Starch Press
- Publication date: November 2022
- Publication place: United States
- Pages: 264
- ISBN: 978-1718502321

Engineering in Plain Sight: An Illustrated Field Guide to the Constructed Environment is a 2022 non-fiction book by civil engineer Grady Hillhouse, published by No Starch Press.

== Content ==
The book is organized into eight functional chapters, using detailed illustrations to catalog various types of civil infrastructure:

- Chapter 1. Electrical Grid
- Chapter 2. Communications
- Chapter 3. Roadways
- Chapter 4. Bridges and Tunnels
- Chapter 5. Railways
- Chapter 6. Dams, Levees, and Coastal structures
- Chapter 7. Municipal Water and Wastewater
- Chapter 8. Construction

== Reception ==
The book received favorable reviews in Library Journal and Design World. It was also featured in the Purdue University INSPIRE Research Institute's Engineering Gift Guide, where it was described as an "invaluable tool for engineering design learning".

In 2024, Bill Gates included the book on his "Holiday Books" list.
