= White Deer Independent School District =

School district in Texas

Address
- 601 Omohundro White Deer, Texas, 79097-0517; United States

District information
- Type: Public
- Grades: PK–12
- Superintendent: Duane Limbaugh
- Governing agency: Texas Education Agency
- Schools: 2
- NCES District ID: 4845450

Students and staff
- Enrollment: 334 (2022–2023)
- Teachers: 33.08 (on an FTE basis)
- Student–teacher ratio: 10.10

Other information
- Website: www.whitedeerisd.net

White Deer Independent School District is a public school district based in White Deer, Texas (USA). Located in Carson County, the district extends into a small portion of Gray County.

In 2009, the school district was rated "recognized" by the Texas Education Agency.

== Schools ==
- White Deer High School
- White Deer Elementary School

== Controversy ==
In July 2024, the ACLU of Texas sent White Deer Independent School District a letter, alleging that the district's 2023-2024 dress and grooming code appeared to violate the Texas CROWN Act, a state law which prohibits racial discrimination based on hair texture or styles, and asking the district to revise its policies for the 2024-2025 school year.
