= Texas State Highway 207 =

State highway in Texas

State Highway 207
- SH 207, highlighted in red

Route information
- Maintained by TxDOT
- Length: 199.712 mi (321.405 km)
- Existed: 1934–present

Major junctions
- South end: US 380 in Post
- US 82 / SH 114 in Ralls; US 62 / US 70 in Floydada; US 287 in Claude; I-40 in Conway; US 60 in Panhandle
- North end: CR 202 at Oklahoma state line southeast of Guymon

Location
- Country: United States
- State: Texas

Highway system
- Highways in Texas; Interstate; US; State; Former; Toll; Loops; Spurs; FM/RM; Park; Rec
← SH 206	→ SH 208

State Highway 207 (SH 207) is a state Highway that runs from Post, Texas through the South Plains and Texas Panhandle to the Oklahoma state line.

== History ==
The highway was originally designated on August 1, 1934 between Floydada and Ralls. On August 1, 1938, a section from Post to Garden City was designated, creating a gap. On October 24, 1938, the section from Ralls to Post was added, closing the gap. On February 21, 1939, SH 207 was extended north to Silverton. On August 27, 1940, the section of SH 207 from Big Spring to Garden City was cancelled. On February 4, 1941, the section of SH 207 from Gail to 8 miles north of Big Spring was cancelled. on March 6, 1941, the section of SH 207 from 8 miles north of Big Spring to Big Spring and the section of SH 207 from Post to Gail was cancelled. On February 28, 1945, the section of SH 207 from Ralls to Post was cancelled and transferred to FM 122. On October 10, 1947, the section of SH 207 from Ralls to Floydada was transferred to US 62, leaving only the section between Silverton and Floydada. On September 1, 1965, the route was extended north and south along its current route, replacing FM 122 south to Post, the portion of FM 284 north to Claude, a portion of the rerouted SH 15 to Sperman, and SH 282 to the Oklahoma state line.

== Junction list ==
County	Location	mi	km	Destinations	Notes
Garza	Post	0.0	0.0	US 380 (East Main Street) / Loop 46 south	
Garza	Post	0.1	0.16	FM 651 north (North Avenue F)	
Garza	Post	0.5	0.80	Spur 575	
Garza		6.9	11.1	FM 211 west	
Crosby		25.9	41.7	FM 40 east	South end of FM 40 overlap
Crosby		28.3	45.5	FM 40 west	North end of FM 40 overlap
Crosby	Ralls	34.0	54.7	US 82 / SH 114 – Lubbock, Crosbyton	
Crosby	Ralls	34.4	55.4	FM 122 east (Tilford Avenue)	
Crosby	Ralls	35.0	56.3	US 62 west – Lubbock	South end of US 62 overlap
Crosby		38.6	62.1	FM 1471	
Crosby		42.5	68.4	FM 193	
Floyd		47.7	76.8	FM 54 west – Petersburg	
Floyd		52.3	84.2	FM 37 west	
Floyd	Floydada	55.8	89.8	US 70 west – Plainview	South end of US 70 overlap
Floyd	Floydada	56.7	91.2	US 62 east / US 70 east / FM 1958 south – Matador	North end of US 62 / US 70 overlap
Floyd	Floydada	57.6	92.7	FM 784 west (Price Street)	
Floyd		61.6	99.1	FM 786 east	South end of FM 786 overlap
Floyd		62.8	101.1	FM 786 west	North end of FM 786 overlap
Floyd		67.0	107.8	FM 97 west – Lockney	South end of FM 97 overlap
Floyd		68.3	109.9	FM 97 east – Flomot	North end of FM 97 overlap
Floyd		73.3	118.0	FM 2286 – Plainview	
Floyd		76.3	122.8	FM 689 east	
Briscoe		86.5	139.2	FM 145	
Briscoe	Silverton	91.2	146.8	SH 86 east – Quitaque	South end of SH 86 overlap
Briscoe		92.2	148.4	FM 3030 north	
Briscoe		95.2	153.2	SH 86 west / FM 284 south – Tulia	North end of SH 86 overlap
Briscoe		105.1	169.1	FM 3300 west	
Briscoe		109.2	175.7	FM 146 west – Vigo Park	
Armstrong		116.9	188.1	FM 285 west – Wayside	
Armstrong		129.4	208.2	FM 2272 east	
Armstrong		134.4	216.3	FM 1258 west	
Armstrong	Claude	142.5	229.3	FM 1151 – Canyon, Palo Duro Canyon State Park	
Armstrong	Claude	143.0	230.1	US 287 – Amarillo, Clarendon	
Carson				FM 2161 west – Amarillo	Former Route 66
Carson				I-40 – Amarillo, Shamrock	I-40 exit 96
Carson	Panhandle			US 60 – Amarillo, White Deer	
Carson	Panhandle			FM 293 west	
Carson				FM 2385 east	
Hutchinson	Borger			Spur 246 north / FM 1551 west	
Hutchinson	Borger			SH 136 south – Amarillo	Interchange; south end of SH 136 overlap
Hutchinson	Borger			SH 152 east (West 3rd Street) – Pampa	South end of SH 152 overlap
Hutchinson	Borger			Spur 119 east (West 10th Street) – Phillips	
Hutchinson	Borger			Spur 140 south / Spur 245 east	Traffic circle
Hutchinson	Borger			RM 3474 west	
Hutchinson				FM 1559 south	
Hutchinson				RM 2277 east	
Hutchinson	Stinnett			SH 152 west – Dumas	North end of SH 152 overlap
Hutchinson	Stinnett			RM 1526 east	
Hutchinson	Stinnett			Bus. SH 152 west	
Hutchinson				SH 136 north – Gruver	North end of SH 136 overlap
Hutchinson				FM 281 – Sunray	
Hansford				SH 51 east	
Hansford				FM 520 west	
Hansford	Spearman			SH 15 east / FM 759 east – Perryton	South end of SH 15 overlap
Hansford				FM 760 south	
Hansford				FM 2387 north	
Hansford				FM 2018 west	
Hansford				SH 15 west – Gruver	North end of SH 15 overlap
Hansford				FM 278 west – Gruver	
Hansford				FM 1261 north	
Hansford				FM 2535 east	
Hansford				Oklahoma CR 202	Texas/Oklahoma state line
1.000 mi = 1.609 km; 1.000 km = 0.621 mi: Concurrency terminus

== Gallery ==
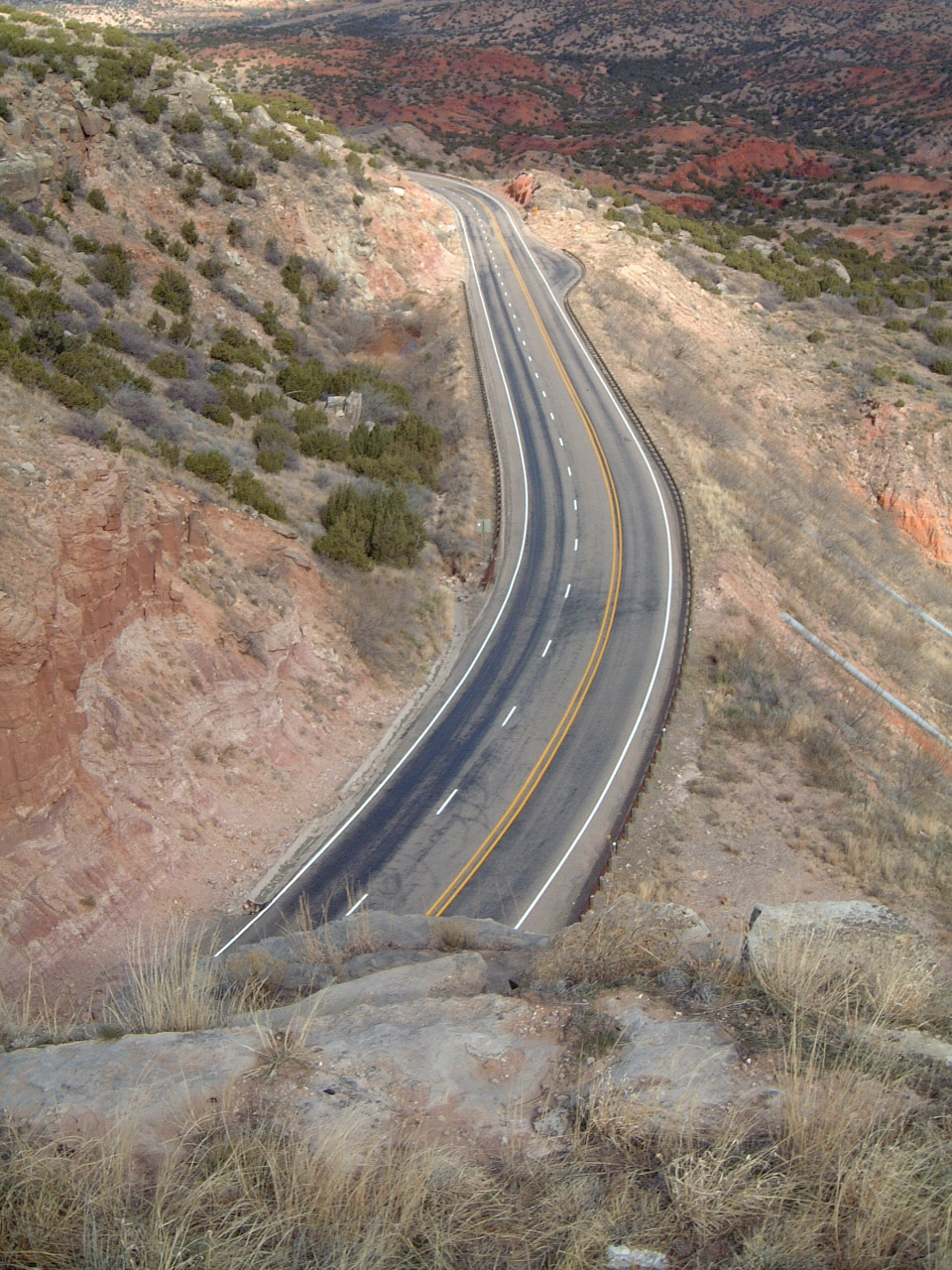
Highway 207 as it winds its way through the valley of the Prairie Dog Town Fork Red River, Armstrong County. This section of Highway 207 is also known as Hamblen Drive, named after Will H. Hamblen (1876–1952), a local rancher.

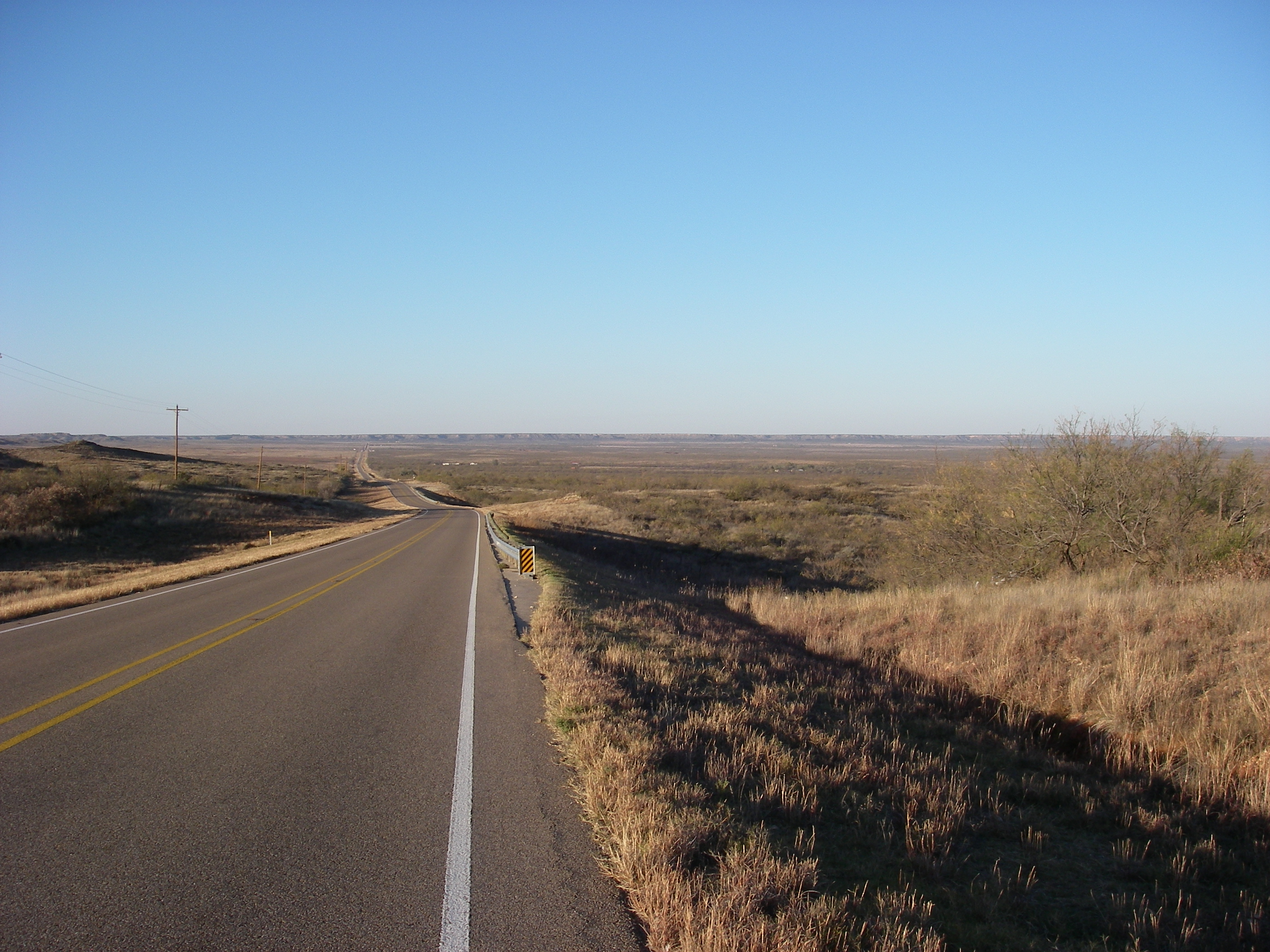
Highway 207 in Crosby County, looking north toward the Caprock Escarpment of the Llano Estacado.

== See also ==
- Caprock Escarpment
- Duffy's Peak
- Farm to Market Road 400
- Farm to Market Road 669
- Hamblen Drive
- Mount Blanco
- Mushaway Peak
- Salt Fork Brazos River
- White River (Texas)
