= Panhandle High School =

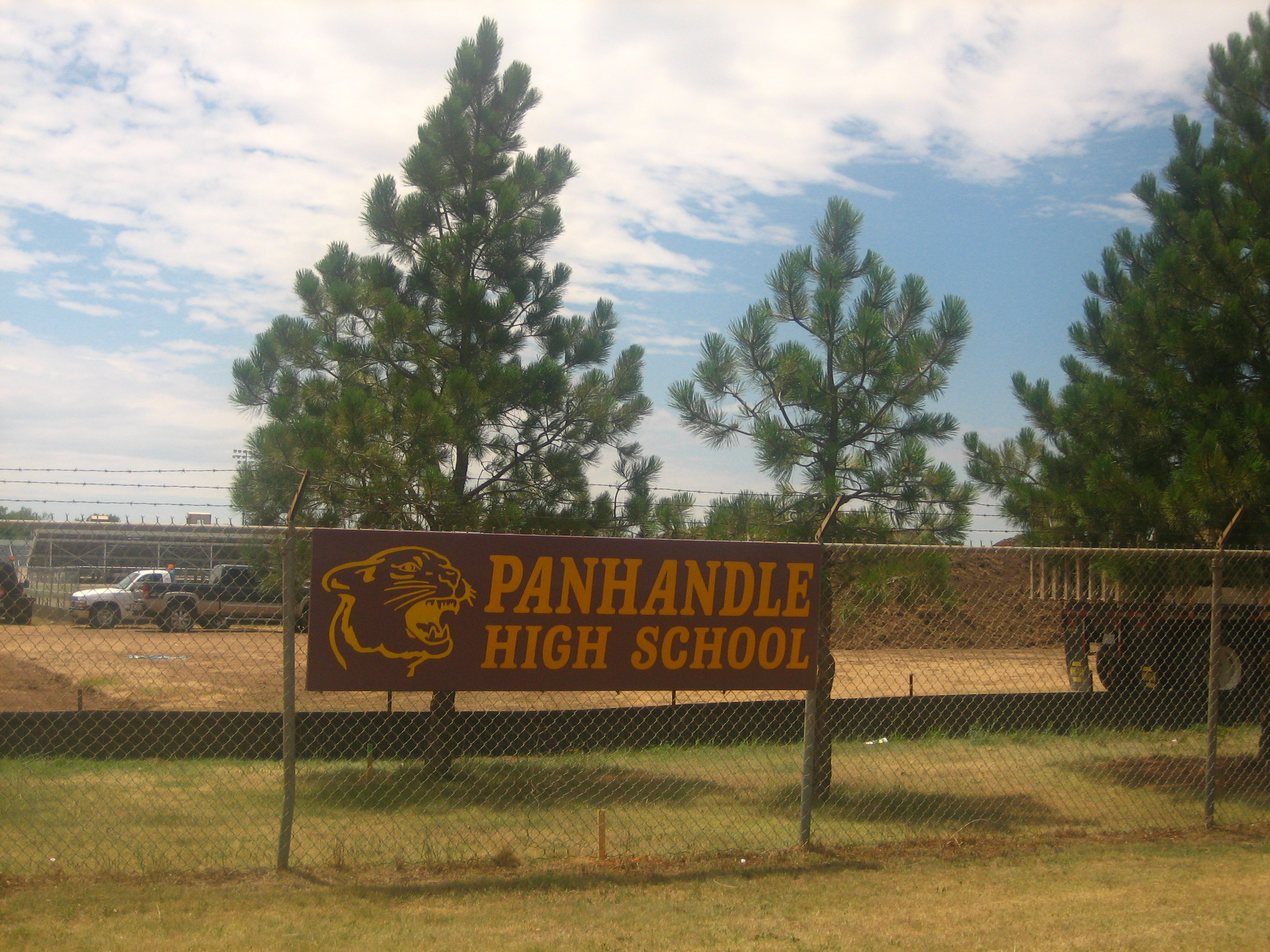

Location
- 106 West 11th Street; Panhandle, Texas 79068; United States; 35.352088°N 101.383237°W

Information
- School type: Public high school
- School district: Panhandle Independent School District
- Superintendent: John Sherrill
- Principal: Chris MacKeown
- Teaching staff: 21.89 (FTE)
- Grades: 9-12
- Enrollment: 199 (2023-2024)
- Student to teacher ratio: 9.09
- Colors: Purple & Gold
- Athletics conference: UIL Class AA-1
- Mascot: Panther/Pantherette
- Yearbook: The Lair
- Website: Panhandle High School

Panhandle High School is a public high school located in the city of Panhandle, Texas in Carson County, United States and classified as a 2A school by the UIL. It is a part of the Panhandle Independent School District located in central Carson County. For the 2021-2022 school year, the school was given an "A" by the Texas Education Agency.

== Athletics ==
The Panhandle Panthers compete in these sports -

- Basketball
- Cross Country
- Football
- Golf
- Powerlifting
- Tennis
- Track and Field

=== State Titles ===
- Boys Basketball
  - 2026(2A/D1)
- Girls Basketball
  - 1992(2A)
  - 2017(2A)
  - 2026(2A/D1)
- Boys Track
  - 1984(2A)
- Girls Track and Field
  - 2021 (2A)
  - 2023 (2A)
  - 2024 (2A)
  - 2025 (2A)
