= White Deer High School =

Location
- 604 South Doucette Street; White Deer, Texas 79097-0248; United States; 35.429259°N 101.172911°W

Information
- School type: Public high school
- School district: White Deer Independent School District
- Principal: Darla Forney
- Faculty: 17.65 (on an FTE basis)
- Grades: 7-12
- Enrollment: 156 (2024-2025)
- Student to teacher ratio: 8.84
- Colors: Blue & White
- Athletics conference: UIL Class A
- Mascot: Bucks/Does
- Website: White Deer High School

White Deer High School is a public high school located in White Deer, Texas (USA) and classified as a 1A school by the UIL. It is part of the White Deer Independent School District located in east central Carson County. For the 2021-2022 school year, the school was given a "B" by the Texas Education Agency.

== Athletics ==
The White Deer Bucks compete in these sports:

- Basketball
- Cross Country
- Football
- Golf
- Powerlifting
- Tennis
- Track and Field

=== State Titles ===
- Boys Basketball -
  - 1962(1A)
- Football -
  - 1958(1A), 1988(1A)
- One Act Play -
  - 1949(B), 1954(1A), 1956(B), 1965(1A)
