= Panhandle Inn =

- U.S. National Register of Historic Places
- Location within Texas Location within the United States
- Location: 301 Main St., Panhandle, Texas
- Coordinates: 35°20′37″N 101°22′48″W
- Built: 1924
- Architect: E.F. Rittenberry
- NRHP reference No.: 100000693
- Added to NRHP: February 28, 2017

The Panhandle Inn, at 301 Main St. in Panhandle, Texas, was listed on the National Register of Historic Places in 2017.

It is a 20,000 square feet (1,900 m^{2}) building for a hotel and other uses, designed by architect E.F. Rittenberry. It was organized in 1924 and it operated as a hotel until 1972.

The building was on Preservation Texas' 2012 list of most endangered places.

Historically thought to be haunted, the urban legend regarding the property has persisted with the local residents into 21st century.

== See also ==
- National Register of Historic Places listings in Carson County, Texas
