= Paul Goldschmidt =

American baseball player (born 1987)

- Goldschmidt with the New York Yankees in 2025

Free agent
- First baseman
- Born: September 10, 1987 (age 39); Wilmington, Delaware, U.S.
- Bats: Right Throws: Right

MLB debut
- August 1, 2011, for the Arizona Diamondbacks

MLB statistics (through 2026 season)
- Batting average: .286
- Hits: 2,277
- Home runs: 390
- Runs batted in: 1,283
- Stats at Baseball Reference

Teams
- Arizona Diamondbacks (2011–2018); St. Louis Cardinals (2019–2024); New York Yankees (2025–2026)

Career highlights and awards
- 7× All-Star (2013–2018, 2022); NL MVP (2022); All-MLB First Team (2022); 4× Gold Glove Award (2013, 2015, 2017, 2021); 5× Silver Slugger Award (2013, 2015, 2017, 2018, 2022); 2× NL Hank Aaron Award (2013, 2022); NL home run leader (2013); NL RBI leader (2013)
Medals
Men's baseball
Representing United States
World Baseball Classic
Gold medal – first place	2017 Los Angeles	Team
Silver medal – second place	2023 Miami	Team
Silver medal – second place	2026 Miami	Team

Paul Edward Goldschmidt (born September 10, 1987) is an American professional baseball first baseman who is a free agent. He has played in Major League Baseball (MLB) for the Arizona Diamondbacks, St. Louis Cardinals, and New York Yankees, and has represented the United States in international competition.

Lightly recruited out of The Woodlands High School in The Woodlands, Texas, Goldschmidt played for the Texas State Bobcats, and was selected by the Diamondbacks in the eighth round of the 2009 MLB draft. He made his MLB debut with them in 2011, and they traded him to the Cardinals during the 2018–19 offseason.

A seven-time MLB All-Star, Goldschmidt won the National League (NL) Most Valuable Player (MVP) Award in 2022. He has also won two Hank Aaron Awards, four Gold Glove Awards, and five Silver Slugger Awards, the latter of which is the most among first baseman. While leading the NL in home runs and runs batted in (RBI) in 2013, Goldschmidt won each of an All-Star selection, Hank Aaron, Gold Glove, and Silver Slugger Awards for the first time. He also has twice finished runner-up for the NL MVP Award, in 2013 and 2015.

== Early life ==
Paul Edward Goldschmidt was born on September 10, 1987, in Wilmington, Delaware and grew up a Houston Astros fan. His parents met at the Rochester Institute of Technology in New York. His mother is Catholic, and his father is Jewish. Goldschmidt and his two younger brothers were raised Catholic. His Jewish great-grandparents, Paul and Ilse Goldschmidt, and his grandfather, Ernie escaped Nazi Germany in 1938 before the Holocaust. Goldschmidt said he and his two brothers "know our Jewish history and we respect those beliefs. We had both sides of it as kids. My dad's side, my mom's side. We were exposed to all of it."

The Goldschmidt family moved from Wilmington to Dallas, and then to Houston, because of the flooring company his family owns. He grew up in The Woodlands, which is in the Greater Houston area, and attended The Woodlands High School and played for their baseball team. With Goldschmidt playing third base, The Woodlands won the Texas state championship in 2006.

== College career ==
Goldschmidt enrolled at Texas State University to play college baseball for the Bobcats. He was named the Southland Conference hitter of the year in 2008 and 2009, Southland player of the year in 2009, and was a third-team All-American as a junior in 2009 after hitting .352 with 18 home runs and 88 runs batted in (RBIs) in 57 games played. Goldschmidt set Bobcat career records with 36 home runs and 179 RBIs. His home run record was broken on April 3, 2026, by Chase Mora.

== Professional career ==
=== Drafts and minor leagues ===
The Los Angeles Dodgers selected Goldschmidt in the 49th round of the 2006 MLB draft. The Dodgers knew he was a long shot to sign with them, but selected him nonetheless. Goldschmidt played with the son of one of the Dodgers' scouts. The Arizona Diamondbacks selected Goldschmidt in the eighth round, with the 246th overall selection, of the 2009 MLB draft. He signed with the Diamondbacks, receiving a $95,000 signing bonus. The Diamondbacks assigned Goldschmidt to the Missoula Osprey of the Rookie-level Pioneer League, where he hit .334 and 18 home runs along with 62 RBIs in his first 74 professional games. The 18 home runs were a Missoula franchise record. The following year, playing for the Visalia Rawhide in the Class A-Advanced California League, he hit 35 home runs, the most for all Class A players, and one behind Mike Moustakas and Mark Trumbo for the Joe Bauman Home Run Award. He was selected as an all-star and won the California League Most Valuable Player Award. He was also named the Arizona Diamondbacks Minor League Player of the Year.

In 2011, Goldschmidt played for the Mobile Bay Bears of the Class AA Southern League. He had a .306 batting average, 30 home runs, and 94 RBIs in 103 games played through the end of July, leading all minor leaguers in home runs and RBIs, while his 82 walks was third-best. After the season, Goldschmidt was again named the Diamondbacks' player of the year, a Baseball America first-team Minor League All-Star, Class AA all-star first baseman, Southern League all-star first baseman, and the Southern League's Most Valuable Player.

=== Arizona Diamondbacks (2011–2018) ===
==== 2011–2014 ====
The Diamondbacks promoted Goldschmidt to the major leagues on August 1, 2011, intending to platoon him with Xavier Nady. Goldschmidt recorded a base hit in his first MLB at-bat on August 1, and hit his first MLB home run the next day off San Francisco Giants pitcher Tim Lincecum. After Nady broke his wrist in mid-August, the Diamondbacks signed Lyle Overbay to replace him. Goldschmidt credited Overbay for his mentorship. Goldschmidt struck out 20 times in his first 44 MLB at-bats. In his rookie season, Goldschmidt batted .250 with eight home runs and 26 RBI in 48 games.

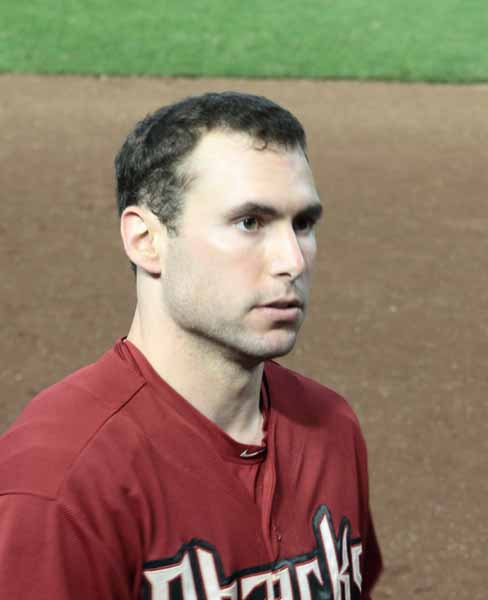
Goldschmidt in 2015

The Diamondbacks made the postseason and played against the Milwaukee Brewers in the 2011 National League Division Series (NLDS). In Game 3, Goldschmidt hit a grand slam to extend the team's lead in its first victory of the series. His home run was the third grand slam by a rookie in MLB postseason history. The Diamondbacks lost the series in five games, and Goldschmidt batted .438 with six RBIs and an OBP of .526.

Goldschmidt and Overbay made the Diamondbacks' Opening Day roster in 2012. Goldschmidt hit his first career regular-season grand slam on June 1, 2012, off of Chicago Cubs pitcher Carlos Mármol at Wrigley Field. Four days later, Goldschmidt hit another grand slam off St. Louis Cardinals reliever Maikel Cleto. Overbay played sparingly, and was designated for assignment at the end of July. In 2012, Goldschmidt played 145 games and batted .286 with 20 home runs, 82 runs, 82 RBIs, 43 doubles, and 18 stolen bases.

Before the 2013 season, the Diamondbacks and Goldschmidt agreed to a $32 million contract covering the 2014 through 2018 seasons with a club option for the 2019 season worth $14.5 million. He would not have been eligible for salary arbitration until the 2014–15 offseason and free agency until the 2017–18 offseason. Goldschmidt was selected to the National League (NL) team in the MLB All-Star Game. Goldschmidt doubled with two outs in the ninth inning, one of only three hits for the NL, and the only extra-base hit. On August 13, he hit a game-tying home run against the Baltimore Orioles in the bottom of the ninth inning to send the game into extra innings. Goldschmidt then hit a walk-off home run in the bottom of the eleventh. Goldschmidt hit a third grand slam on August 20, 2013, against J. J. Hoover of the Cincinnati Reds. In 160 games that season, he attained a .302 batting average, 36 home runs, and 125 RBI. Goldschmidt finished second in the voting for the NL Most Valuable Player (MVP) Award, behind Pittsburgh Pirates outfielder Andrew McCutchen. He led MLB with four walk-off hits in 2013.

Goldschmidt was the starting first baseman for the NL in the 2014 All-Star Game. In 2014, Goldschmidt batted .300 with 19 home runs, 75 runs, and 69 RBIs. While playing against the Pittsburgh Pirates on August 1, Goldschmidt was hit by a pitch from Ernesto Frieri in the 9th inning. The resulting impact broke a bone in his left hand, which prematurely ended his season.

==== 2015–2018 ====
On June 10, 2015, Goldschmidt hit his 100th career home run against Brett Anderson of the Los Angeles Dodgers. At the time of his 100th home run, Goldschmidt was sixth on the Diamondbacks' all-time home run list. Later that year, Goldschmidt was again the starting first baseman for the NL in the All-Star Game. Goldschmidt attained a .321 batting average with 33 home runs and 110 RBIs, with a major-league-leading 29 intentional walks, in 2015. He also was 2nd in the league in power-speed number (25.7). He won his second Gold Glove and Silver Slugger awards. For the second time in three seasons, Goldschmidt was voted the runner-up for the NL MVP Award, this time finishing behind Washington Nationals outfielder Bryce Harper.

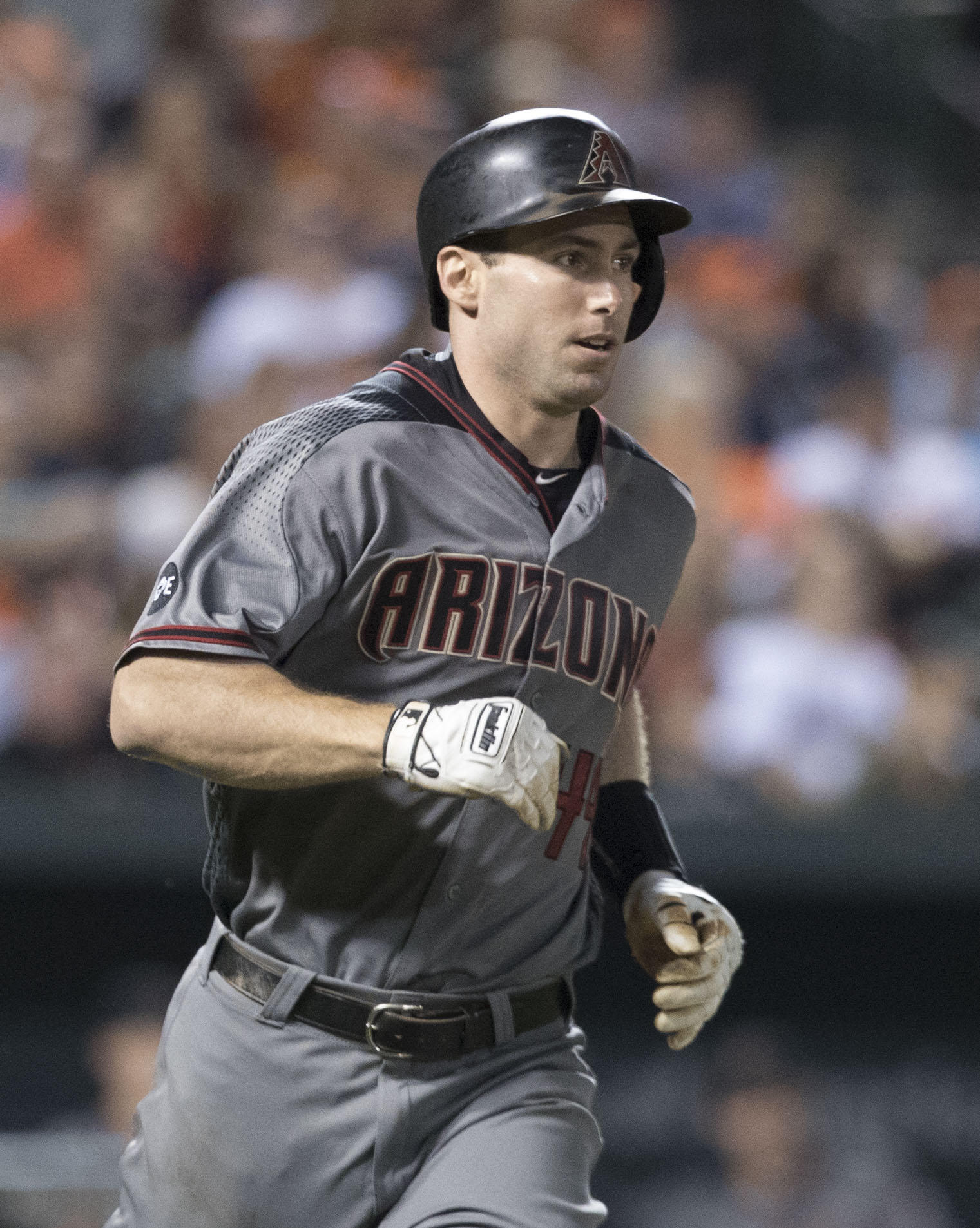
Goldschmidt in 2016

In 2016, Goldschmidt batted .297 with 24 home runs, 106 runs, and 95 RBIs in 579 at-bats. He also was third in the league in power–speed number (27.4). He was selected for the All-Star Game, where he went 0-for-3.

On August 3, 2017, Goldschmidt hit three home runs in a game for the first time, bolstering the Diamondbacks' 10–8 win over the Chicago Cubs. For the fifth time in his career, Goldschmidt was named to the NL All-Star Team. On September 13, in a game against the Colorado Rockies, Goldschmidt recorded his 1,000th career hit. Goldschmidt finished the 2017 season batting .297 with 36 home runs, 117 runs, and 120 RBIs. He tied for the NL lead in power-speed number (24.0). After the season, Goldschmidt was awarded his third Gold Glove and Silver Slugger awards. He also finished third in voting for the NL MVP Award.

In the NL Wild Card Game, Goldschmidt hit a three-run home run in the first inning that helped the Diamondbacks to win 11–8 over the Rockies. During the NLDS, Goldschmidt batted only .091. The Diamondbacks lost the series to the Los Angeles Dodgers.

Through the first 20 games in May of the 2018 season, Goldschmidt struggled, batting only 7-for-73 (.096). At the time, this lowered his batting average for the season to just .198. Goldschmidt improved in the following month, batting .390 from June 1 to July 3. In June, he won the NL Player of the Month Award for the first time in his career. His efforts earned him a spot in the All-Star Game for a sixth consecutive year. On August 3, Goldschmidt hit his 200th career home run against Chris Stratton of the San Francisco Giants. Goldschmidt finished the 2018 season batting .290 with 33 home runs, 95 runs, and 83 RBIs. His 1,088 games played, 209 home runs, 710 RBIs, 1,179 hits, 708 runs scored, and 267 doubles are second in Diamondbacks' history, behind Luis Gonzalez. After the season, the Diamondbacks exercised the $14.5 million option on Goldschmidt's contract for the 2019 season.

=== St. Louis Cardinals (2019–2024) ===
On December 5, 2018, the Diamondbacks traded Goldschmidt to the St. Louis Cardinals in exchange for Luke Weaver, Carson Kelly, Andy Young, and a Competitive Balance Round B pick in the 2019 MLB draft.

==== 2019–2021 ====
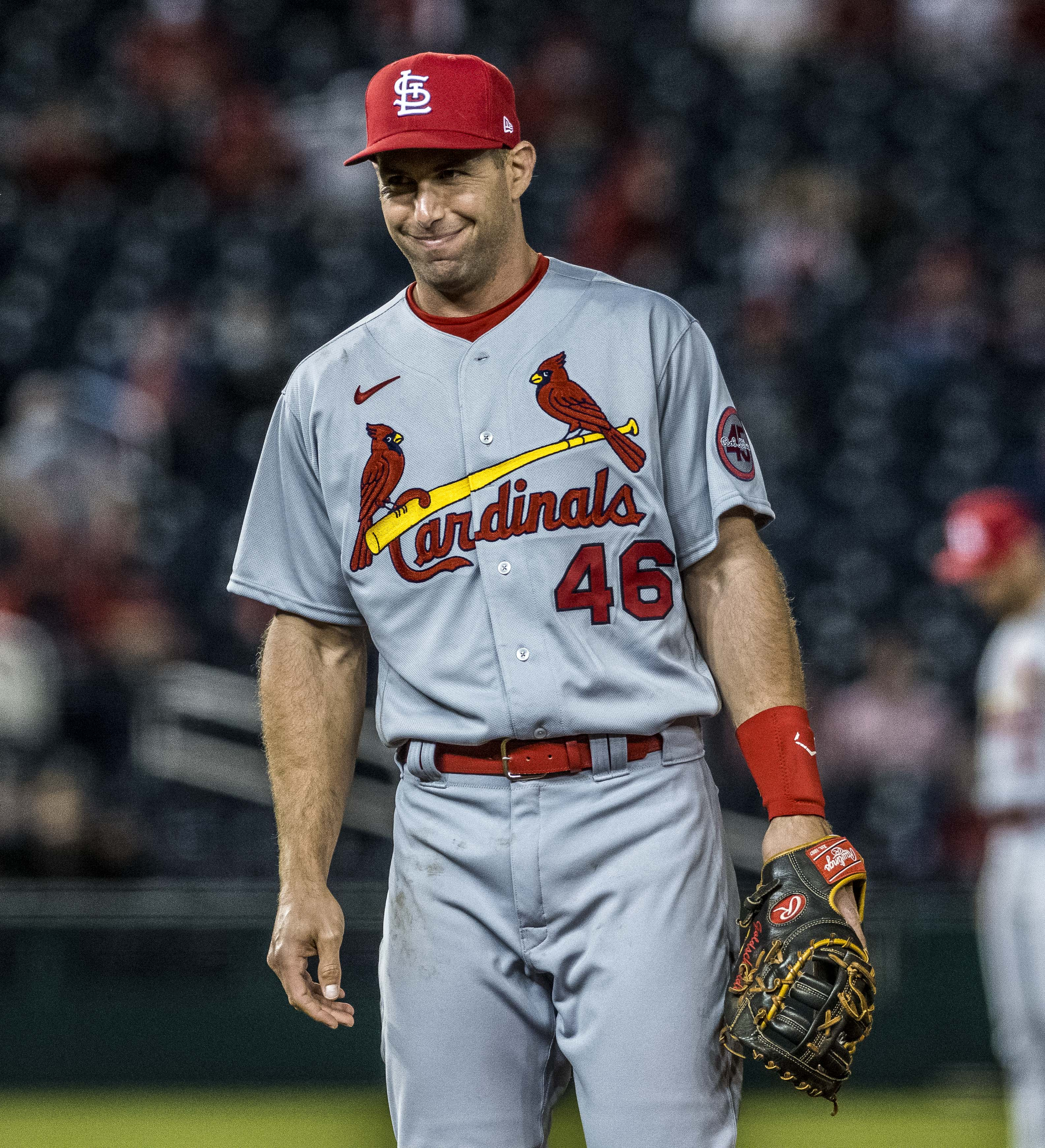
Goldschmidt with the Cardinals in 2021

On March 23, 2019, Goldschmidt and the Cardinals agreed to a five-year contract extension worth $130 million, spanning the 2020–24 seasons. The deal became the largest in team history, eclipsing the seven-year, $120 million contract with Matt Holliday signed in 2010. In his second game with the Cardinals against the Milwaukee Brewers, he hit three home runs and became the first player in major league history to hit three homers in either his first or second game with a new team.

On April 20, in a game against the New York Mets, Goldschmidt hit a 465-foot home run off Paul Sewald, which would become both his longest career home run and the longest home run hit at Busch Stadium during the Statcast era (since 2015). On June 21, in a game against the Los Angeles Angels, Goldschmidt hit a foul ball that ended up flying over the upper deck seating and out of the stadium, the first such occurrence in the current Busch Stadium. On July 26, in a game against the Houston Astros, Goldschmidt reached a streak of six home runs in six consecutive games for the first time in his career, also tying the Cardinals franchise record previously set by Matt Carpenter and Mark McGwire. Goldschmidt finished his first regular season as a Cardinal slashing .260/.346/.476 with 34 home runs and 97 RBIs over 161 games. On defense, he had the best fielding percentage of all major league first basemen (.996). Following the season, he was nominated for his first Gold Glove in a Cardinals uniform.

In the shortened 2020 season, Goldschmidt played in 58 games, batting .304/.417/.466 with six home runs and 21 RBIs in 231 at-bats. On October 28, he underwent surgery to have a bone spur removed from his right elbow.

On April 13, 2021, against the Washington Nationals, Goldschmidt hit his 250th career home run. Goldschmidt finished the 2021 season slashing .294/.365/.514 with 31 home runs and 99 RBIs in 158 games. He won the Gold Glove Award at first base, one of five Cardinals (an MLB record) to win the award that year.

==== 2022 ====
On May 23, 2022, Goldschmidt hit a walk-off grand slam in the bottom of the tenth inning against the Toronto Blue Jays for a 7–3 win. That grand slam extended Goldschmidt's hitting streak to 15 games, during which he hit .438 with 28 hits, 12 doubles, five home runs, and 22 RBIs. Since RBI became an official statistic in 1920, no major leaguer had previously achieved all of those totals during any 15-game span. (Note: Per STATS, Inc.) For May, Goldschmidt led the major leagues with a 1.288 on-base plus slugging (OPS) and 33 RBI, alongside leading the NL with a .404 average. His ten home runs ranked second in the NL. He was named the NL Player of the Month.

The hitting streak continued for 25 games until June 4 against the Chicago Cubs, when Goldschmidt was 0-for-2 with two bases on balls. Over the 25 games, he batted .424/.482/.869, 24 extra-base hits, and 36 RBIs. It was the longest by a Cardinal since Albert Pujols hit 30 straight in 2003, and tied for the third-longest for the Cardinals since 1963. Goldschmidt reached base safely in 46 consecutive games, which ended on June 11, against the Cincinnati Reds.

In a two-game span against the Pittsburgh Pirates on June 14–15, Goldschmidt achieved nine hits in 12 at-bats with four home runs, six runs scored, nine RBIs, a double, and no strikeouts. No player had matched or exceeded those totals with noo strikeouts over a two-game span since Ty Cobb on May 5–6, 1925, when the Detroit Tigers visited the St. Louis Browns. On June 21, Goldschmidt claimed his fourth NL Player of the Week Award after having batted .467 (14-for-30), with four home runs, 11 RBIs, and a .967 slugging percentage. He had at least one hit in each of the seven games over the week, including four multi-hit games. On July 5, Goldschmidt scored his 1,000th run in a game against the Atlanta Braves. On July 16, he hit his 300th career home run in a game against the Reds, the 153rd major leaguer to reach the milestone.

Goldschmidt was named the starting first baseman for the NL in the All-Star Game at Dodger Stadium. In the first inning, he hit his first career home run in an All-Star Game. On July 23, in a game against the Reds, Goldschmidt recorded his 1,000th career RBI.

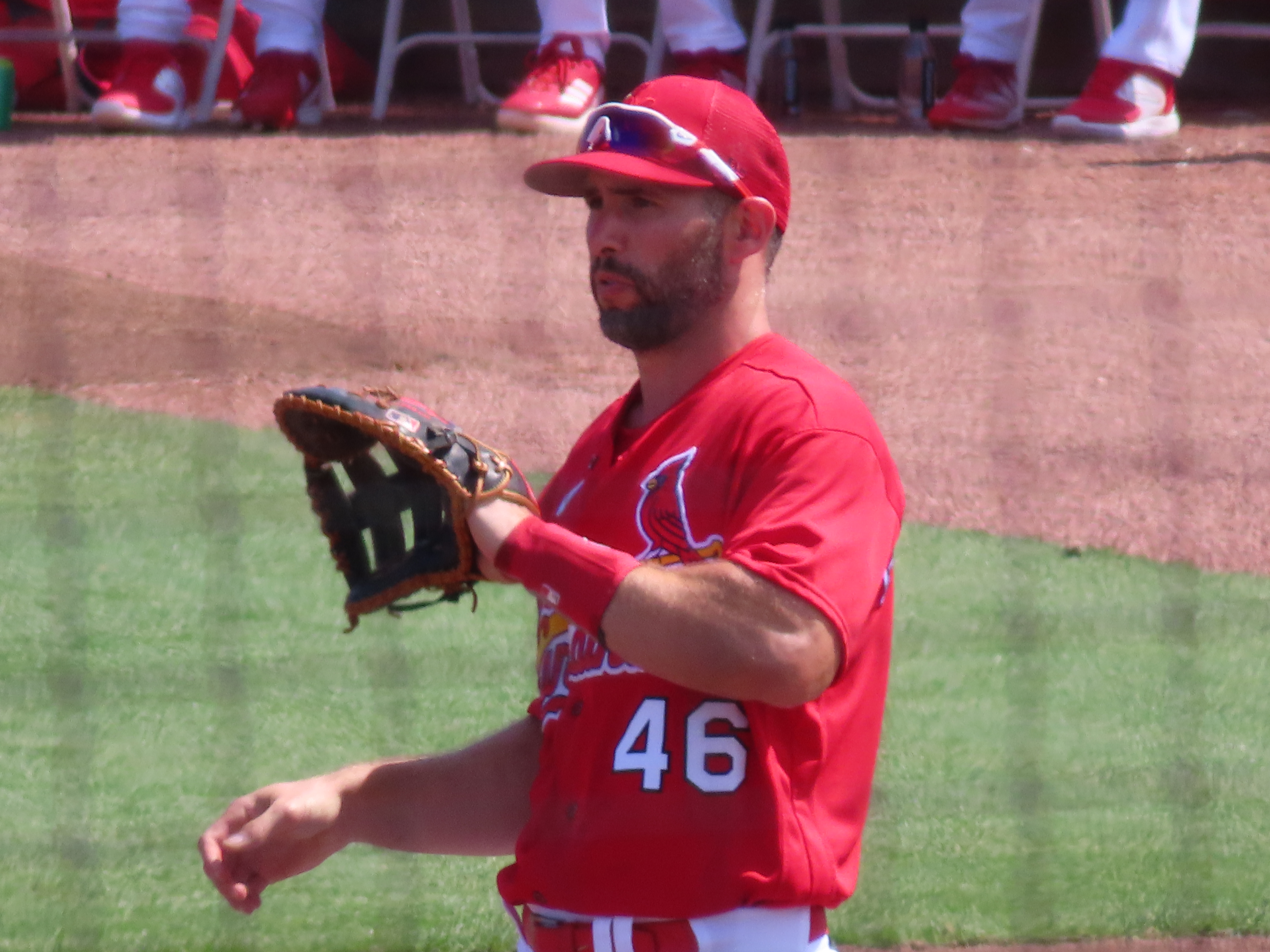
Goldschmidt during spring training in 2023

On July 24, it was announced that Goldschmidt and teammate Nolan Arenado would not be allowed to travel with the Cardinals to Toronto for a scheduled series against the Blue Jays, due to his lack of a COVID-19 vaccination. At the end of the season, Goldschmidt led the NL with a .578 slugging percentage and .981 OPS while ranking second with 115 RBIs, 324 total bases, and a .404 on-base percentage. His .317 batting average and 35 home runs were ranked third and tied fifth respectively in the NL. Goldschmidt was named the NL Hank Aaron Award winner. Goldschmidt was also awarded his fifth Silver Slugger Award, giving him the all-time record for Silver Sluggers won among first basemen. On November 17, Goldschmidt won his first NL MVP Award, garnering 22 of 30 first-place votes.

==== 2023–2024 ====
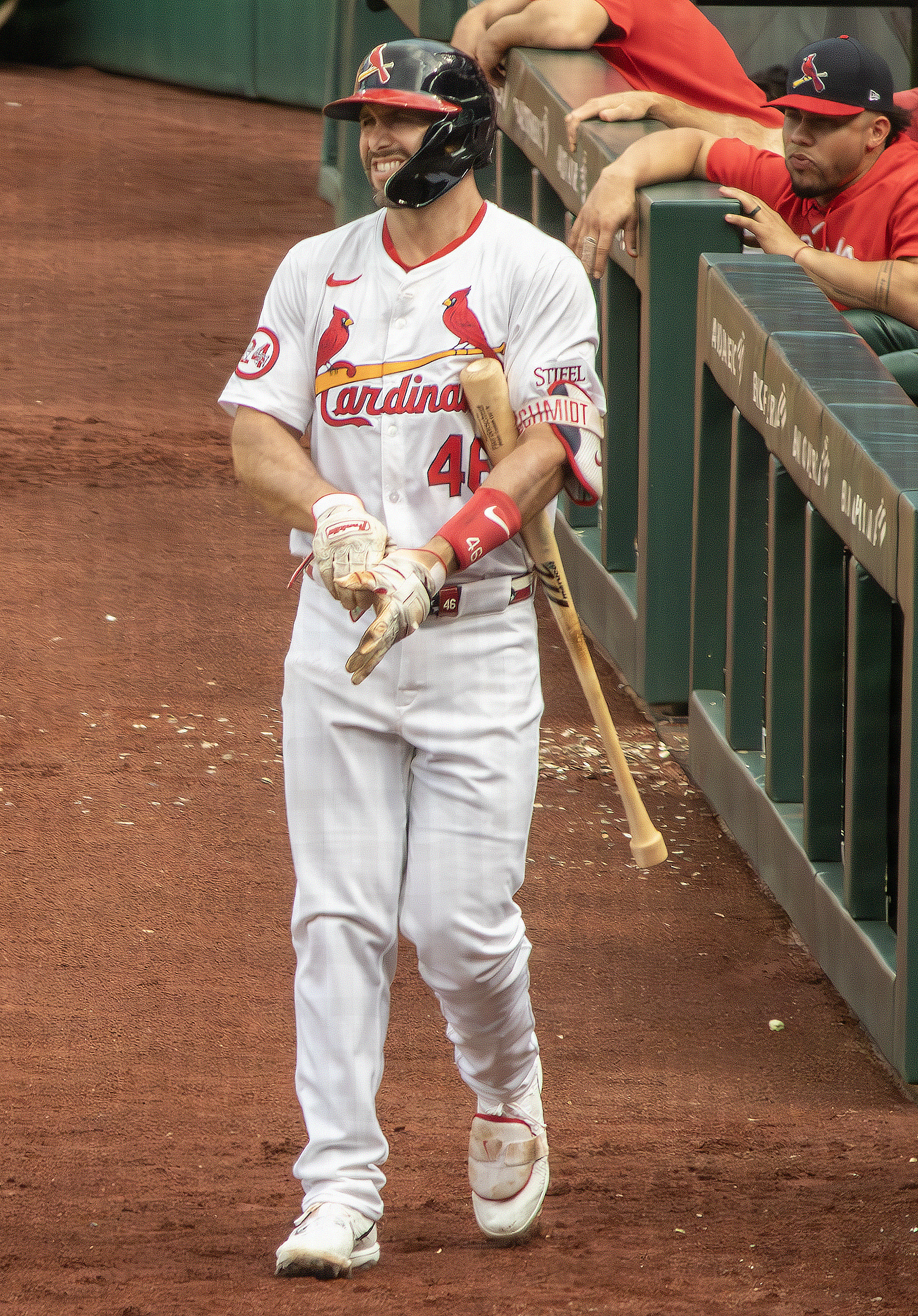
Goldschmidt prepares for his final home at bat with the Cardinals

After playing in the 2023 London Series, Goldschmidt became the first player in MLB history to play regular-season games in five different countries, having played in the United States, Australia, Mexico, Canada, and the United Kingdom. He followed up his MVP season batting .258/.363/.447 with 25 home runs and 80 RBIs in 154 games.

On July 26, 2024, Goldschmidt hit his 2,000th career hit against the Washington Nationals by hitting a two-run homer run off Kyle Finnegan in the bottom of the 10th inning. With that hit, he became the 295th player in Major League history to reach 2,000 hits and the 5th active player to achieve that milestone. In 154 games in his final season in St. Louis, Goldschmidt's results dropped for the second consecutive season. He slashed .245/.302/.414 with 22 home runs, 65 RBIs, and 11 stolen bases.

=== New York Yankees (2025–present) ===
On December 30, 2024, Goldschmidt signed a one-year, $12.5 million deal with the New York Yankees. In 2025, Goldschmidt appeared in 146 games for the Yankees, batting .274/.328/.406 with 10 home runs, 45 RBIs, and five stolen bases in 534 plate appearances. During the postseason, he appeared in six games and went 4-for-9 (.444) with a run scored and a walk, as the Yankees advanced past the Boston Red Sox before being eliminated by the Toronto Blue Jays.

On February 12, 2026, the Yankees re-signed Goldschmidt to a one-year, $4 million contract. Goldschmidt said that he had hoped to return to New York after enjoying his first season with the team and cited the Yankees' goal of improving on the previous season and winning a championship. Entering the 2026 season, Goldschmidt accepted a reduced role as Ben Rice became the Yankees' primary first baseman, with Goldschmidt expected to play primarily against left-handed pitching and serve as a late-inning defensive replacement. Goldschmidt appeared in 105 games and batted .252/.313/.452 with 18 home runs and 52 RBIs in 345 at-bats. Despite receiving considerably fewer at-bats than the previous season, his 18 home runs were his most since joining New York. Goldschmidt continued in a limited role during the 2026 postseason. He appeared in four games and went hitless in six at-bats, drawing two walks and scoring one run, as New York defeated the Boston Red Sox before losing to the Tampa Bay Rays.

== International career ==
Goldschmidt was selected to the United States national team for the 2017 World Baseball Classic (WBC), splitting time at first base with Eric Hosmer. In 13 at-bats, he slashed .077/.250/.077 with three walks. The U.S. would go on to defeat Puerto Rico in the championship game for their first-ever WBC title.

On August 6, 2022, Goldschmidt announced that he would again play for the U.S. in the 2023 WBC. In seven games, he had a .280 batting average with one home run and a .895 OPS. The U.S. would reach the championship game for the second consecutive tournament, but would ultimately lose to Japan, 3–2.

Goldschmidt played for the United States for the third time in the 2026 WBC. He went 1-for-3 with a strikeout throughout the tournament. He became the first player to play for the U.S. team in three WBCs. The United States reached a third consecutive championship game, but this time fell to Venezuela, 3–2. With the conclusion of Goldschmidt's international career, he finished with one championship and two runner-up finishes.

== Personal life ==
Goldschmidt met his wife during his freshman year at Texas State, and they married in October 2010. They have two children. In September 2013, he graduated from the University of Phoenix with a Bachelor of Science degree in management. Goldschmidt was raised Catholic by his mother but says he became a Christian as an adult in about 2014 while playing in Arizona.

Goldschmidt owned a home in Scottsdale, Arizona, selling it in 2020. That same year, he bought a home in Palm Beach Gardens, Florida, which he purchased from professional golfer Louis Oosthuizen.

During his tenure with the Diamondbacks, Goldschmidt set up a charity, called "Goldy's Fund 4 Kids". His charity hosted bowling events that raised money for Phoenix Children's Hospital.

== See also ==
- List of Arizona Diamondbacks team records
- List of Jews in sports
- List of Major League Baseball annual putouts leaders
- List of Major League Baseball career assists as a first baseman leaders
- List of Major League Baseball career bases on balls leaders
- List of Major League Baseball career doubles leaders
- List of Major League Baseball career extra base hits leaders
- List of Major League Baseball career games played as a first baseman leaders
- List of Major League Baseball career home run leaders
- List of Major League Baseball career intentional bases on balls leaders
- List of Major League Baseball career OPS leaders
- List of Major League Baseball career putouts leaders
- List of Major League Baseball career runs batted in leaders
- List of Major League Baseball career runs scored leaders
- List of Major League Baseball career slugging percentage leaders
- List of Major League Baseball career strikeouts by batters leaders
- List of Major League Baseball career total bases leaders
- List of people from Wilmington, Delaware
- List of Texas State University alumni
- St. Louis Cardinals award winners and league leaders

Awards and achievements
Preceded by Scooter Gennett; Charlie Blackmon; Nolan Arenado	National League Player of the Month; June 2018; July 2019; May 2022	Succeeded by Matt Carpenter; Aristides Aquino; Kyle Schwarber
