= Joe Ethridge =

American football player (1928–2007)

No. 85
- Position: Tight end

Personal information
- Born: April 15, 1928; Armstrong County, Texas, U.S.
- Died: December 16, 2007 (aged 79); Wichita Falls, Texas, U.S.
- Listed height: 6 ft 0 in (1.83 m)
- Listed weight: 230 lb (104 kg)

Career information
- High school: Kermit (Texas)
- College: Southern Methodist
- NFL draft: 1949: 6th round, 54th overall pick

Career history
- Green Bay Packers (1949)

Career NFL statistics
- Games played: 12
- Stats at Pro Football Reference

Joe Paul Ethridge (April 15, 1928 – December 16, 2007) was a player in the National Football League (NFL).

== Biography ==
Ethridge was born in Conway, Texas. Ethridge was drafted by the Green Bay Packers in the sixth round of the 1949 NFL draft and played that season as an End with the team. He played at the collegiate level at Southern Methodist University.
