= Carson County, Texas =

County in Texas, United States

- County
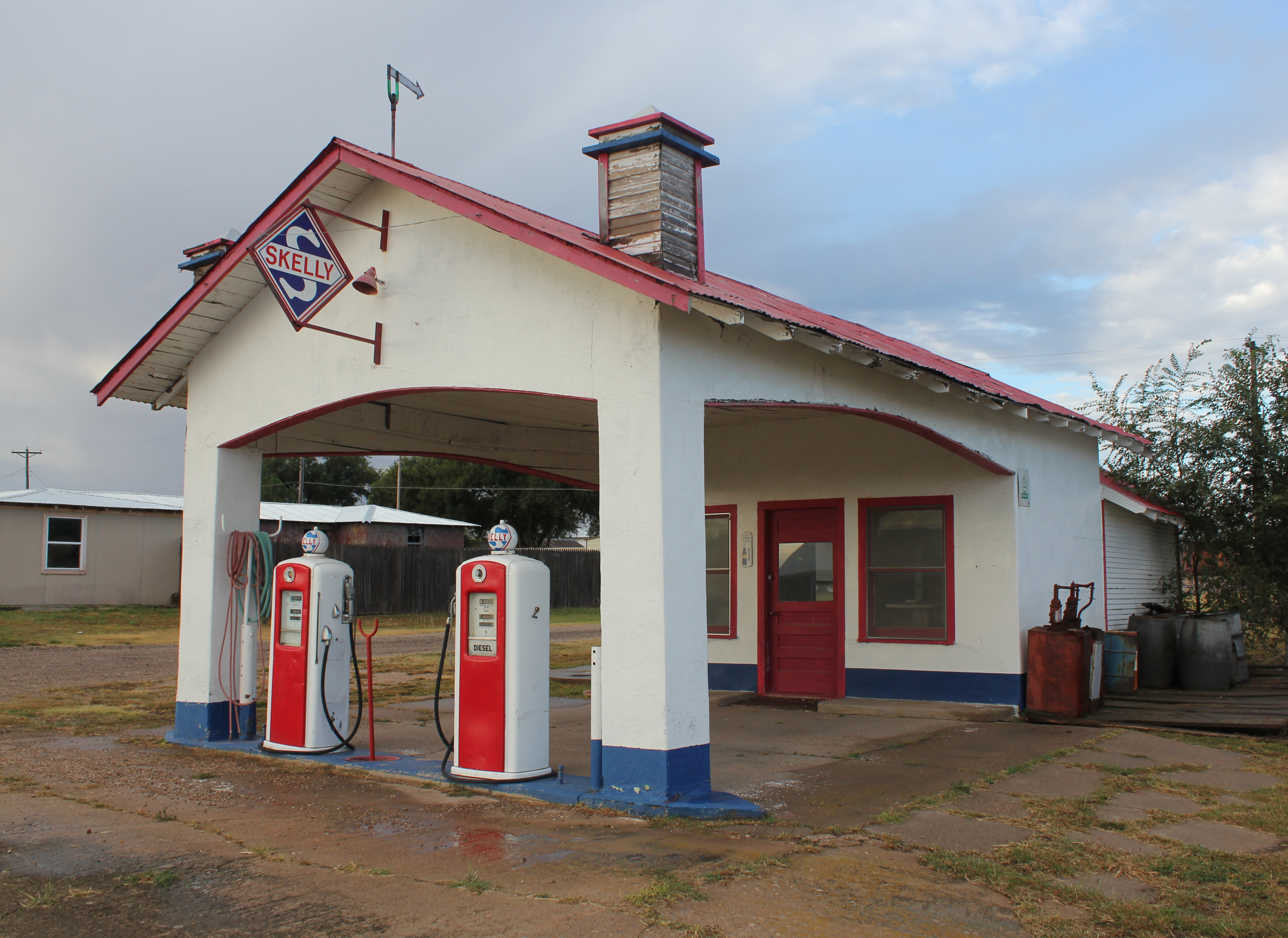
- Restored filling station in Skellytown, Texas

- Location within the U.S. state of Texas
- Coordinates: 35°25′N 101°21′W
- Country: United States
- State: Texas
- Founded: 1888
- Named for: Samuel Price Carson
- Seat: Panhandle
- Largest town: Panhandle

Area
  - Total: 924 sq mi (2,390 km^{2})
  - Land: 920 sq mi (2,400 km^{2})
  - Water: 3.9 sq mi (10 km^{2}) 0.4%

Population (2020)
  - Total: 5,807
  - Estimate (2025): 5,805 ▼
  - Density: 6.3/sq mi (2.4/km^{2})
- Time zone: UTC−6 (Central)
  - Summer (DST): UTC−5 (CDT)
- Congressional district: 13th
- Website: www.co.carson.tx.us

Carson County is a county located in the U.S. state of Texas. As of the 2020 census, its population was 5,807. The county seat is Panhandle. The county was founded in 1876 and later organized in 1888. It is named for Samuel Price Carson, the first secretary of state of the Republic of Texas.

Carson County is included in the Amarillo, TX metropolitan statistical area.

== History ==
=== Native Americans ===
Prehistoric hunter-gatherers were the first inhabitants, followed by the Plains Apache. Modern Apache tribes followed them and were displaced by Comanches. The Comanches were defeated by the United States Army in the Red River War of 1874.

=== Early explorations ===
Spanish conquistador Francisco Vásquez de Coronado explored the Llano Estacado in 1541.

=== County established and growth ===
Carson County was established in 1876 from Bexar County. The county was organized in 1888. Panhandle, the only town at the time, became the county seat.

Ranching began to be established in the county in the 1880s. The JA Ranch encompassed over a million acres (4,000 km^{2}) within six adjoining counties. Richard E. McNalty established the Turkey Track Ranch in 1878. One of the early failed attempts came in 1882 when Charles G. Francklyn purchased 637,440 acres (2,579.6 km^{2}) of railroad lands in adjoining counties to form the Francklyn Land and Cattle Company. The lands were later sold to the White Deer Lands Trust of British bondholders in 1886 and 1887.

Railroads began to reach the county by 1886 when the Atchison, Topeka and Santa Fe Railway subsidiary Southern Kansas Railway extended the line into Texas, making Panhandle City a railhead in 1888. In 1889, the Fort Worth and Denver Railway linked Panhandle City with Washburn in Armstrong County. In 1904, the Chicago, Rock Island and Gulf bought the line. In 1908, the Southern Kansas of Texas extended its line from Panhandle City to Amarillo, thus making the Kansas-Texas-New Mexico line a major transcontinental route. The Choctaw, Oklahoma and Texas Railroad built across the southern edge of the county.

Pumping underground water with windmills resolved the issue of bringing water from Roberts County via the railroad.

White Deer in 1909 became home to Polish Catholic immigrants, who had first settled Panna Maria in Karnes County before migrating to Carson County.

Experimental drilling by Gulf Oil Corporation led to the county's, and the Panhandle's, first oil and gas production in late 1921. Borger field was discovered in 1925, sparking much oil exploration and production of the Panhandle area. By the end of 2000, more than 178,398,900 barrels (28,363,160 m^{3}) of petroleum had been produced from county lands.

In September 1942, the Pantex Ordnance Plant was built on 16,076 acres (65.06 km^{2}) of southwestern Carson County land, to pack and load shells and bombs in support of the World War II effort. Operations ceased August 1945, and in 1949, the site was sold to Texas Tech University at Amarillo for agricultural experimentation. Pantex reopened in 1951 as a nuclear weapons assembly plant. In 1960, Pantex began high-explosives development in support of the Lawrence Livermore National Laboratory in California. Pantex has a long-term mission to safely and securely maintain the nation's nuclear weapons stockpile and dismantle weapons retired by the military.

== Geography ==
According to the U.S. Census Bureau, the county has a total area of 924 square miles (2,390 km^{2}), of which 3.9 square miles (10 km^{2}) (0.4%) are covered by water.

=== Major highways ===
- I-40
  - I-40 BL (Amarillo)
  - I-40 BL (Groom)
- US 60
- US 287
- SH 136
- SH 152
- SH 207

=== Adjacent counties ===
- Hutchinson County (north)
- Roberts County (northeast)
- Gray County (east)
- Donley County (southeast)
- Armstrong County (south)
- Randall County (southwest)
- Potter County (west)
- Moore County (northwest)

== Demographics ==
Historical population
Census	Pop.	Note	%±
1890	356		—
1900	469		31.7%
1910	2,127		353.5%
1920	3,078		44.7%
1930	7,745		151.6%
1940	6,624		−14.5%
1950	6,852		3.4%
1960	7,781		13.6%
1970	6,358		−18.3%
1980	6,672		4.9%
1990	6,576		−1.4%
2000	6,516		−0.9%
2010	6,182		−5.1%
2020	5,807		−6.1%
2025 (est.)	5,805	▼	0.0%
U.S. Decennial Census; 1850–1900 1910; 1920 1930 1940; 1950 1960 1970; 1980 1990 2000; 2010 2020

=== 2020 census ===
As of the 2020 census, the county had a population of 5,807. The median age was 42.8 years, with 24.2% of residents under the age of 18 and 19.5% aged 65 or older. For every 100 females there were 98.7 males, and for every 100 females age 18 and over there were 95.8 males.

The racial makeup of the county was 87.3% White, 0.3% Black or African American, 0.9% American Indian and Alaska Native, 0.4% Asian, 0.1% Native Hawaiian and Pacific Islander, 2.4% from some other race, and 8.6% from two or more races. Hispanic or Latino residents of any race comprised 9.6% of the population.

<0.1% of residents lived in urban areas, while 100.0% lived in rural areas.

There were 2,368 households in the county, of which 30.4% had children under the age of 18 living in them. Of all households, 56.1% were married-couple households, 18.2% were households with a male householder and no spouse or partner present, and 21.5% were households with a female householder and no spouse or partner present. About 27.4% of all households were made up of individuals and 13.1% had someone living alone who was 65 years of age or older.

There were 2,776 housing units, of which 14.7% were vacant. Among occupied housing units, 80.6% were owner-occupied and 19.4% were renter-occupied. The homeowner vacancy rate was 2.8% and the rental vacancy rate was 16.6%.

=== Racial and ethnic composition ===
Carson County, Texas – Racial and ethnic composition Note: the US Census treats Hispanic/Latino as an ethnic category. This table excludes Latinos from the racial categories and assigns them to a separate category. Hispanics/Latinos may be of any race.
Race / Ethnicity (NH = Non-Hispanic)	Pop 2000	Pop 2010	Pop 2020	% 2000	% 2010	% 2020
White alone (NH)	5,904	5,473	4,873	90.61%	88.53%	83.92%
Black or African American alone (NH)	38	35	19	0.58%	0.57%	0.33%
Native American or Alaska Native alone (NH)	47	56	46	0.72%	0.91%	0.79%
Asian alone (NH)	8	19	19	0.12%	0.31%	0.33%
Pacific Islander alone (NH)	1	0	1	0.02%	0.00%	0.02%
Other race alone (NH)	2	0	7	0.03%	0.00%	0.12%
Mixed race or Multiracial (NH)	58	74	284	0.89%	1.20%	4.89%
Hispanic or Latino (any race)	458	525	558	7.03%	8.49%	9.61%
Total	6,516	6,182	5,807	100.00%	100.00%	100.00%

=== 2000 census ===
As of the 2000 census, 6,516 people, 2,470 households, and 1,884 families were residing in the county. The population density was 7 people/mi^{2} (2.7 people/km^{2}). The 2,815 housing units had an average density of 3 per square mile (1.2/km^{2}). The racial makeup of the county was 93.82% White, 0.58% African American, 1.00% Native American, 0.14% Asian, 3.06% from other races, and 1.41% from two or more races. About 7.03% of the population were Hispanics or Latinos of any race. In ancestry, 25.0% were of German, 14.2% were of Irish, 8.1% were of English, 4.7% were of American, 3.2% were of Scottish, and 3.1% were Polish.

Of the 2,470 households, 35.8% had children under living with them, 65.3% were married couples living together, 8.1% had a female householder with no husband present, and 23.7% were not families. About 22.3% of all households were made up of individuals, and 11.3% had someone living alone who was 65 or older. The average household size was 2.60, and the average family size was 3.04.

In the county, the age distribution was 27.9% under 18, 6.2% from 18 to 24, 26.3% from 25 to 44, 23.9% from 45 to 64, and 15.7% who were 65 or older. The median age was 39 years. For every 100 females, there were 95.80 males. For every 100 females age 18 and over, there were 92.20 males.

The median income for a household in the county was $40,285, and for a family was $47,147. Males had a median income of $34,271 versus $23,325 for females. The per capita income for the county was $19,368. About 5.40% of families and 7.30% of the population were below the poverty line, including 8.90% of those under age 18 and 9.40% of those age 65 or over.

== Communities ==
=== Towns ===
- Groom
- Panhandle (county seat)
- Skellytown
- White Deer

=== Unincorporated community ===
- Conway

=== Ghost towns ===
- Cuyler
- Deal
- Lark

== Education ==
School districts:

- Groom Independent School District
- Panhandle Independent School District
- Sanford-Fritch Independent School District
- White Deer Independent School District

All of the county is in the service area of Amarillo College.

== Politics ==
Carson County is located within District 87 of the Texas House of Representatives. Carson County is located within District 31 of the Texas Senate.

United States presidential election results for Carson County, Texas
Year	Republican		Democratic		Third party(ies)	
Year	No.	%	No.	%	No.	%
1912	21	7.50%	200	71.43%	59	21.07%
1916	78	18.84%	326	78.74%	10	2.42%
1920	208	32.15%	428	66.15%	11	1.70%
1924	306	32.14%	611	64.18%	35	3.68%
1928	891	60.04%	592	39.89%	1	0.07%
1932	212	13.23%	1,391	86.77%	0	0.00%
1936	147	8.51%	1,568	90.74%	13	0.75%
1940	362	18.10%	1,636	81.80%	2	0.10%
1944	446	25.30%	1,216	68.97%	101	5.73%
1948	413	23.55%	1,301	74.17%	40	2.28%
1952	1,471	57.64%	1,071	41.97%	10	0.39%
1956	1,061	51.91%	976	47.75%	7	0.34%
1960	1,387	57.62%	1,009	41.92%	11	0.46%
1964	1,044	39.83%	1,574	60.05%	3	0.11%
1968	1,211	45.10%	904	33.67%	570	21.23%
1972	1,868	75.75%	561	22.75%	37	1.50%
1976	1,269	44.94%	1,542	54.60%	13	0.46%
1980	1,888	64.17%	1,006	34.19%	48	1.63%
1984	2,412	74.12%	826	25.38%	16	0.49%
1988	2,100	66.71%	1,034	32.85%	14	0.44%
1992	1,647	53.88%	825	26.99%	585	19.14%
1996	1,742	63.81%	742	27.18%	246	9.01%
2000	2,216	80.82%	480	17.51%	46	1.68%
2004	2,450	83.22%	485	16.47%	9	0.31%
2008	2,548	85.50%	406	13.62%	26	0.87%
2012	2,451	88.23%	292	10.51%	35	1.26%
2016	2,620	88.39%	249	8.40%	95	3.21%
2020	2,779	89.01%	297	9.51%	46	1.47%
2024	2,866	90.21%	290	9.13%	21	0.66%

United States Senate election results for Carson County, Texas1
Year	Republican		Democratic		Third party(ies)	
Year	No.	%	No.	%	No.	%
2024	2,755	87.43%	328	10.41%	68	2.16%

United States Senate election results for Carson County, Texas2
Year	Republican		Democratic		Third party(ies)	
Year	No.	%	No.	%	No.	%
2020	2,756	88.53%	286	9.19%	71	2.28%

Texas Gubernatorial election results for Carson County
Year	Republican		Democratic		Third party(ies)	
Year	No.	%	No.	%	No.	%
2022	2,177	90.94%	183	7.64%	34	1.42%

== See also ==
- Carson County Square House Museum
- List of museums in the Texas Panhandle
- National Register of Historic Places listings in Carson County, Texas
- Recorded Texas Historic Landmarks in Carson County
