= White Deer, Texas =

- Town
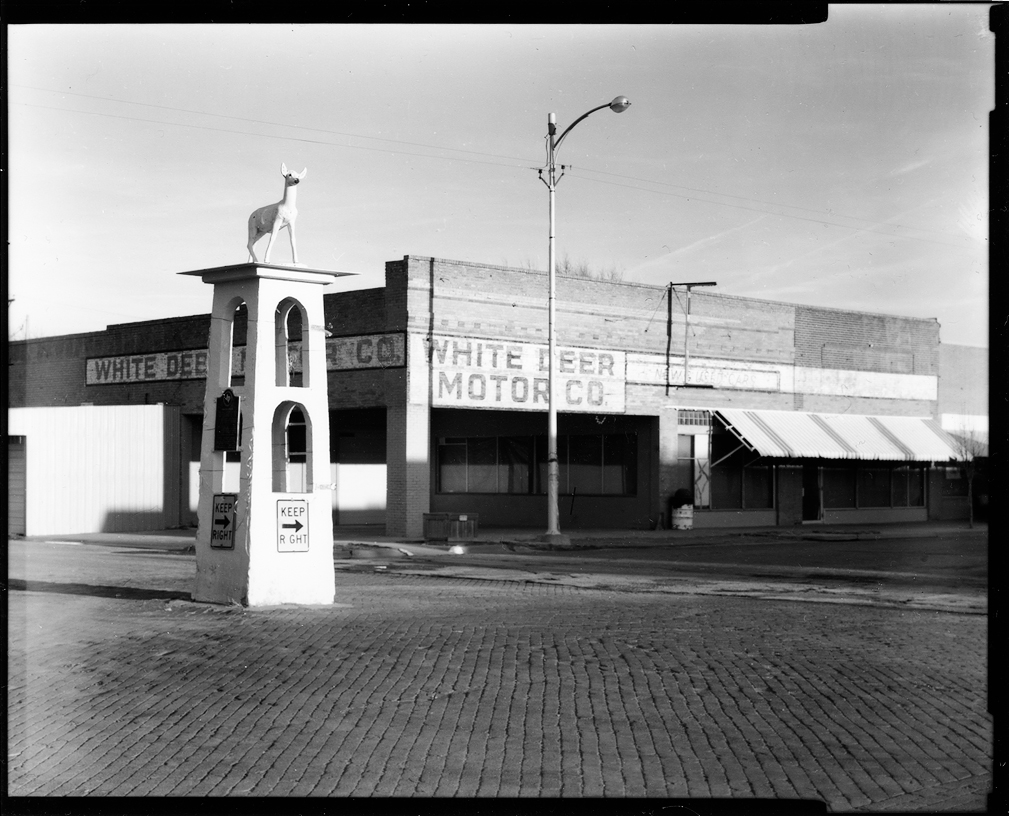
- Downtown White Deer

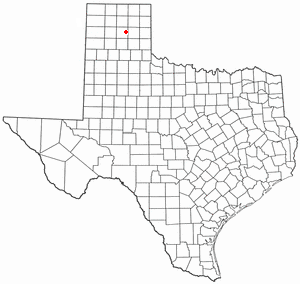
- Location of White Deer, Texas

- Coordinates: 35°26′00″N 101°10′30″W
- Country: United States
- State: Texas
- County: Carson

Government

Area
  - Total: 1.74 sq mi (4.51 km^{2})
  - Land: 1.74 sq mi (4.51 km^{2})
  - Water: 0 sq mi (0.00 km^{2})
- Elevation: 3,366 ft (1,026 m)

Population (2020)
  - Total: 918
  - Density: 527/sq mi (204/km^{2})
- Time zone: UTC-6 (Central (CST))
  - Summer (DST): UTC-5 (CDT)
- ZIP code: 79097
- Area code: 806
- FIPS code: 48-78316
- GNIS feature ID: 2413477
- Website: www.whitedeer.us

White Deer is a town in Carson County, Texas, United States. The population was 918 at the 2020 census. It is part of the Amarillo metropolitan statistical area.

== Geography ==
White Deer is located along U.S. Highway 60 in east central Carson County, 13 miles (21 km) northeast of Panhandle, the Carson County seat, and 40 miles (64 km) northeast of Amarillo.

According to the United States Census Bureau, the town has a total area of 1.7 square miles (4.5 km^{2}), all land.

=== Climate ===
According to the Köppen climate classification, White Deer has a semiarid climate, BSk on climate maps.

== History ==
The community was first settled around 1882, when the British-owned Francklyn Land and Cattle Company, later reorganized as the White Deer Company, occupied the area and began stocking it with cattle. George Tyng, general manager of the property, built the headquarters for White Deer or Diamond F Ranch at the site in 1887. Around the same time, the Purcell Company purchased land in the vicinity as a right-of-way for the Southern Kansas Railway of Texas. A depot was built in 1888. The site was initially known as "Paton" (after John Paton), then "Whig", before being renamed White Deer in January 1899 – after nearby White Deer Creek. During the 1890s, British shareholders began selling land for small farms and ranches to settlers. The community moved to its present location near the railroad line in 1908. A year later, Henry Czerner and Ben Urbanczyk established a community of Polish farmers from Central Texas at the northeastern edge of town. About 50 people were living in White Deer by 1910.

The discovery of oil and gas in Carson County in 1919 brought growth to White Deer and the surrounding area. The community incorporated in 1921, and the population had risen to 200 by the mid-1920s. At the peak of the oil boom in the late 1920s, White Deer was home to nearly 3,000 people. Soon after, the city experienced a period of decline. A disastrous fire in 1931, the negative economic impact of the Great Depression, and tornadoes in 1945 and 1951 were all contributing factors in White Deer's decline. In the late 1950s, the town became a shipping point for grain and cattle produced in the area. By 1980, the population was 1,210. That figure decreased to 1,125 in 1990 and 1,060 in 2000.

A statue of a white deer stands on a concrete pedestal in the middle of the town's main intersection. At its base is a historical marker, erected in 1965, that commemorates the town's rich history.

== Demographics ==
Historical population
| Census | Pop. | Note | %± |
|---|---|---|---|
| 1930 | 1,010 | | — |
| 1940 | 733 | | −27.4% |
| 1950 | 629 | | −14.2% |
| 1960 | 1,057 | | 68.0% |
| 1970 | 1,092 | | 3.3% |
| 1980 | 1,210 | | 10.8% |
| 1990 | 1,125 | | −7.0% |
| 2000 | 1,060 | | −5.8% |
| 2010 | 1,000 | | −5.7% |
| 2020 | 918 | | −8.2% |
U.S. Decennial Census

=== 2020 census ===
White Deer racial composition (NH = Non-Hispanic) (Note: Note: the US Census treats Hispanic/Latino as an ethnic category. This table excludes Latinos from the racial categories and assigns them to a separate category. Hispanics/Latinos can be of any race.)
| Race | Number | Percentage |
|---|---|---|
| White (NH) | 762 | 83.01% |
| Black or African American (NH) | 1 | 0.11% |
| Native American or Alaska Native (NH) | 2 | 0.22% |
| Asian (NH) | 2 | 0.22% |
| Mixed/Multi-Racial (NH) | 63 | 6.86% |
| Hispanic or Latino | 88 | 9.59% |
| Total | 918 | |

As of the 2020 United States census, there were 918 people, 318 households, and 234 families residing in the town.

=== 2000 census ===
As of the census of 2000, 1,060 people, 425 households, and 311 families were residing in the town. The population density was 608.0 people/sq mi (235.2/km^{2}). The 490 housing units had an average density of 281.1/sq mi (108.7/km^{2}). The racial makeup of the town was 96.32% White, 0.85% Native American, 1.79% from other races, and 1.04% from two or more races. Hispanics or Latinos of any race were 5.28% of the population.

Of the 425 households, 32.9% had children under 18 living with them, 62.8% were married couples living together, 8.9% had a female householder with no husband present, and 26.8% were not families. About 25.9% of all households were made up of individuals, and 13.2% had someone living alone who was 65 or older. The average household size was 2.49, and the average family size was 3.01.

In the town, the age distribution was 27.0% under 18, 5.8% from 18 to 24, 28.2% from 25 to 44, 23.3% from 45 to 64, and 15.7% who were 65 or older. The median age was 38 years. For every 100 females, there were 93.1 males. For every 100 females age 18 and over, there were 89.2 males.

Estimated median household income in 2007 was $51,548 ($36,953 in 2000). Estimated median house value in 2007 was $88,886 ($48,400 in 2000). Mean prices in 2007 were: All housing units – $87,280; detached houses – $87,800; townhouses or other attached units – $61,183; mobile homes – $36,214; occupied boats, RVs, vans, etc. – $12,500.

== Climate ==
White Deer-area historical tornado activity is slightly above Texas state average. It is 118% greater than the overall U.S. average. On June 27, 1992, an F4 tornado 22.0 miles away from the town center injured seven people and caused between $5,000,000 and $50,000,000 in damages. On June 8, 1995, an F4 (maximum wind speeds 207–260 mph) tornado 11.7 miles away from the White Deer town center injured seven people and caused between $5,000,000 and $50,000,000 in damages.

== Education ==
Public education in White Deer is provided by the White Deer Independent School District. The district has an enrollment of around 400 students on two campuses, White Deer Elementary School (grades Pre-K–8) and White Deer High School (grades 9–12).
