= Panhandle, Texas =

- City
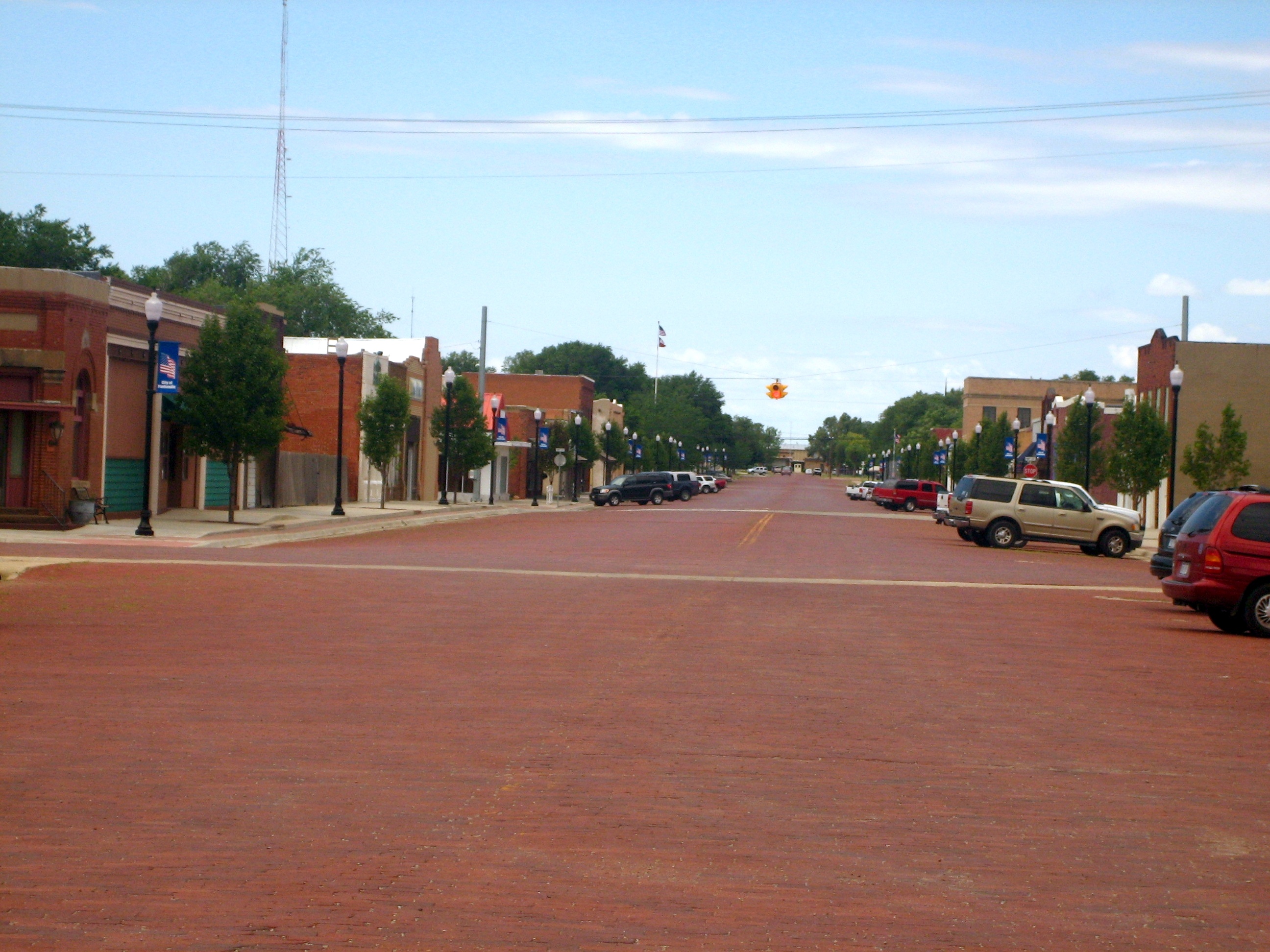
- Brick streets in Panhandle
- Motto: People of Pride and Purpose
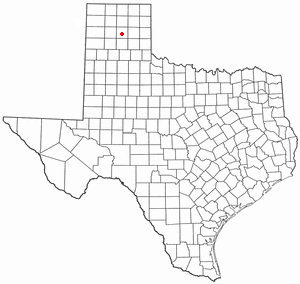
- Location of Panhandle, Texas

- Coordinates: 35°20′45″N 101°22′45″W
- Country: United States
- State: Texas
- County: Carson

Government
  - Mayor: Doyle Robinson

Area
  - Total: 2.12 sq mi (5.50 km^{2})
  - Land: 2.12 sq mi (5.50 km^{2})
  - Water: 0 sq mi (0.00 km^{2})
- Elevation: 3,455 ft (1,053 m)

Population (2020)
  - Total: 2,378
  - Density: 1,120/sq mi (432/km^{2})
- Time zone: UTC−6 (Central (CST))
  - Summer (DST): UTC−5 (CDT)
- ZIP code: 79068
- Area code: 806
- FIPS code: 48-54960
- GNIS feature ID: 2413105
- Website: www.panhandletx.govoffice2.com

Panhandle is a city in and the county seat of Carson County, Texas, United States. The population was 2,378 at the 2020 census. Panhandle is part of the Amarillo metropolitan statistical area.

== History ==
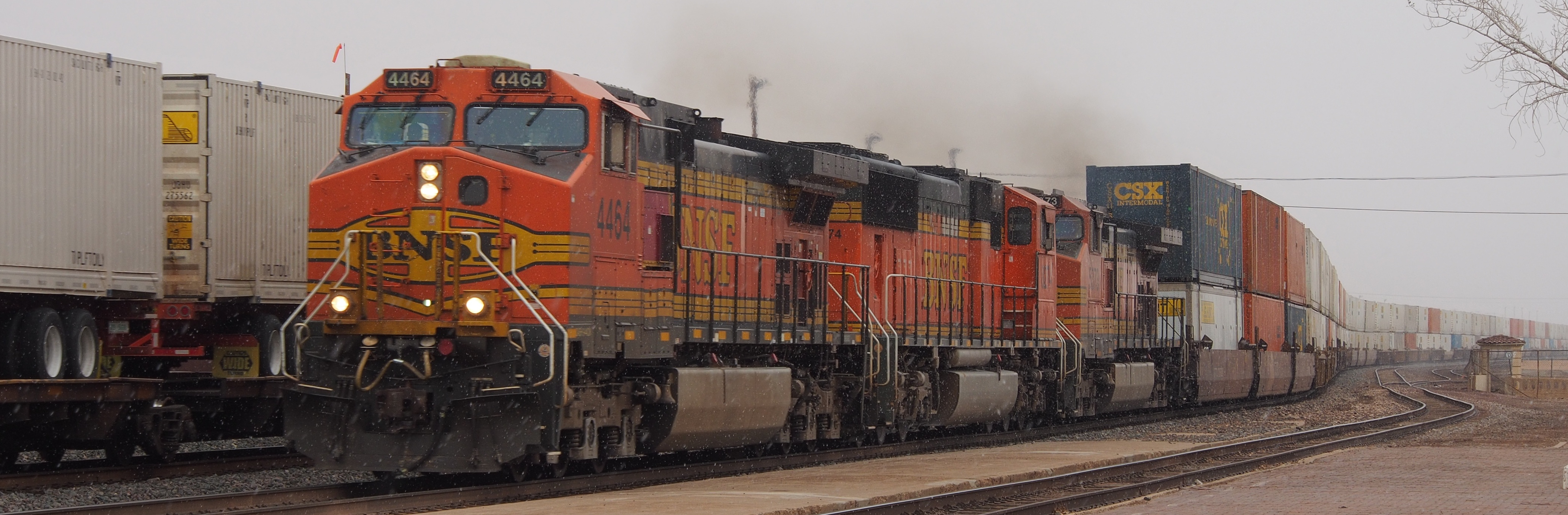
A BNSF intermodal train in Winslow, Arizona

Panhandle derives its name from its central location in the Texas Panhandle. Originally named "Carson City", it was later changed to "Panhandle City".

In 1887, Panhandle obtained a post office, and in 1888, the city was planned as the terminus of the Panhandle and Santa Fe Railway. At that time, the city was surrounded by several large cattle ranches. The community soon acquired a bank, a mercantile store, a wagonyard, a school, a newspaper, and three saloons.

In 1888, Carson County was organized, and Panhandle became the county seat. The area's cattlemen were reconciled to the arrival of farmers because they produced needed forage crops, such as hay, and introduced more families with eligible young women for the cowboy bachelors of the cattle kingdom.

Panhandle was scandalized in 1897 after George E. Morrison, a preacher at the Methodist Episcopal Church, poisoned his wife Minnie with a strychnine-laced apple so that he could marry his mistress Miss Annie Whittlesey of Topeka, Kansas. Morrison was sentenced to die in the gallows at Vernon in Wilbarger County, Texas, his last words being: "Jesus, Lover of My Soul".

In 1909, Panhandle voted to incorporate with a mayor-council government.

The population grew in the 1920s when Panhandle became the center of a natural gas field.

A new county courthouse was completed in 1950.

Panhandle continued to thrive in the 1980s as a regional marketing and shipping center for cattle, wheat, and petroleum products.

On June 28, 2016, two BNSF intermodal trains collided head-on in Panhandle. The collision triggered a fireball, resulting in three crew member deaths and one injury. Estimated damage was $16 million.

== Geography ==
Panhandle is located slightly south of the center of Carson County. U.S. Route 60 passes through the city, leading northeast 27 miles (43 km) to Pampa and southwest the same distance to Amarillo. Texas State Highway 207 crosses US 60 in Panhandle and passes through the center of the city; it leads north 23 miles (37 km) to Borger and south 9 miles (14 km) to Interstate 40 at Conway.

According to the United States Census Bureau, Panhandle has a total area of 2.1 square miles (5.5 km^{2}), all land.

=== Climate ===
According to the Köppen climate classification system, Panhandle has a borderline humid subtropical (Cfa)/cool semi-arid (BSk) climate. It features hot summers with moderate rainfall and cold, though extremely variable, and generally dry winters.

Climate data for Panhandle, Texas (1981–2010)
Month	Jan	Feb	Mar	Apr	May	Jun	Jul	Aug	Sep	Oct	Nov	Dec	Year
Mean daily maximum °F (°C)	49.9 (9.9)	53.9 (12.2)	62.7 (17.1)	71.9 (22.2)	80.0 (26.7)	87.9 (31.1)	92.8 (33.8)	91.0 (32.8)	83.8 (28.8)	72.7 (22.6)	60.3 (15.7)	48.7 (9.3)	71.3 (21.8)
Mean daily minimum °F (°C)	22.2 (−5.4)	25.2 (−3.8)	31.8 (−0.1)	40.2 (4.6)	50.4 (10.2)	59.6 (15.3)	64.0 (17.8)	62.9 (17.2)	55.1 (12.8)	43.6 (6.4)	31.8 (−0.1)	22.6 (−5.2)	42.4 (5.8)
Average precipitation inches (mm)	0.61 (15)	0.64 (16)	1.39 (35)	1.77 (45)	2.79 (71)	3.59 (91)	2.51 (64)	2.80 (71)	2.20 (56)	1.94 (49)	0.92 (23)	0.76 (19)	21.92 (557)
Average snowfall inches (cm)	3.9 (9.9)	3.1 (7.9)	2.0 (5.1)	0.5 (1.3)	0.1 (0.25)	0.0 (0.0)	0.0 (0.0)	0.0 (0.0)	0.0 (0.0)	0.3 (0.76)	1.7 (4.3)	4.1 (10)	15.8 (40)
Source: NOAA

== Demographics ==
Historical population
Census	Pop.	Note	%±
1910	521		—
1920	638		22.5%
1930	2,035		219.0%
1940	978		−51.9%
1950	1,406		43.8%
1960	1,958		39.3%
1970	2,141		9.3%
1980	2,226		4.0%
1990	2,353		5.7%
2000	2,589		10.0%
2010	2,452		−5.3%
2020	2,378		−3.0%
U.S. Decennial Census

=== 2020 census ===
Panhandle racial composition (NH = Non-Hispanic) (Note: Note: the US Census treats Hispanic/Latino as an ethnic category. This table excludes Latinos from the racial categories and assigns them to a separate category. Hispanics/Latinos can be of any race.)
Race	Number	Percentage
White (NH)	1,987	83.56%
Black or African American (NH)	13	0.55%
Native American or Alaska Native (NH)	17	0.71%
Asian (NH)	7	0.29%
Pacific Islander (NH)	1	0.04%
Some Other Race (NH)	3	0.13%
Mixed/Multi-Racial (NH)	109	4.58%
Hispanic or Latino	241	10.13%
Total	2,378	

As of the 2020 United States census, there were 2,378 people, 1,058 households, and 723 families residing in the city.

=== 2000 census ===
As of the census of 2000, 2,589 people, 945 households, and 719 families were residing in the city. The population density was 1,216.6 people/sq mi (469.3/km^{2}). The 1,014 housing units averaged 476.5/sq mi (183.8/km^{2}). The racial makeup of the city was 93.16% White, 0.66% African American, 0.77% Native American, 0.08% Asian, 3.86% from other races, and 1.47% from two or more races. Hispanics or Latinos of any race were 8.96% of the population.

Of the 945 households, 38.2% had children under 18 living with them, 64.0% were married couples living together, 9.2% had a female householder with no husband present, and 23.9% were not families. About 22.4% of all households were made up of individuals, and 12.5% had someone living alone who was 65 or older. The average household size was 2.63, and the average family size was 3.10.

In the city, the population was spread out, with 29.4% under the age of 18, 5.9% from 18 to 24, 26.4% from 25 to 44, 21.4% from 45 to 64, and 17.0% who were 65 years of age or older. The median age was 38 years. For every 100 females, there were 90.6 males. For every 100 females age 18 and over, there were 86.1 males.

The median income for a household in the city was $41,686, and for a family was $50,735. Males had a median income of $38,155 versus $25,329 for females. The per capita income for the city was $21,640. About 4.0% of families and 6.7% of the population were below the poverty line, including 7.1% of those under 18 and 11.4% of those age 65 or over.

== Arts and culture ==
Sites listed on the National Register of Historic Places include Carson County Square House Museum, and the Panhandle Inn.

== Education ==
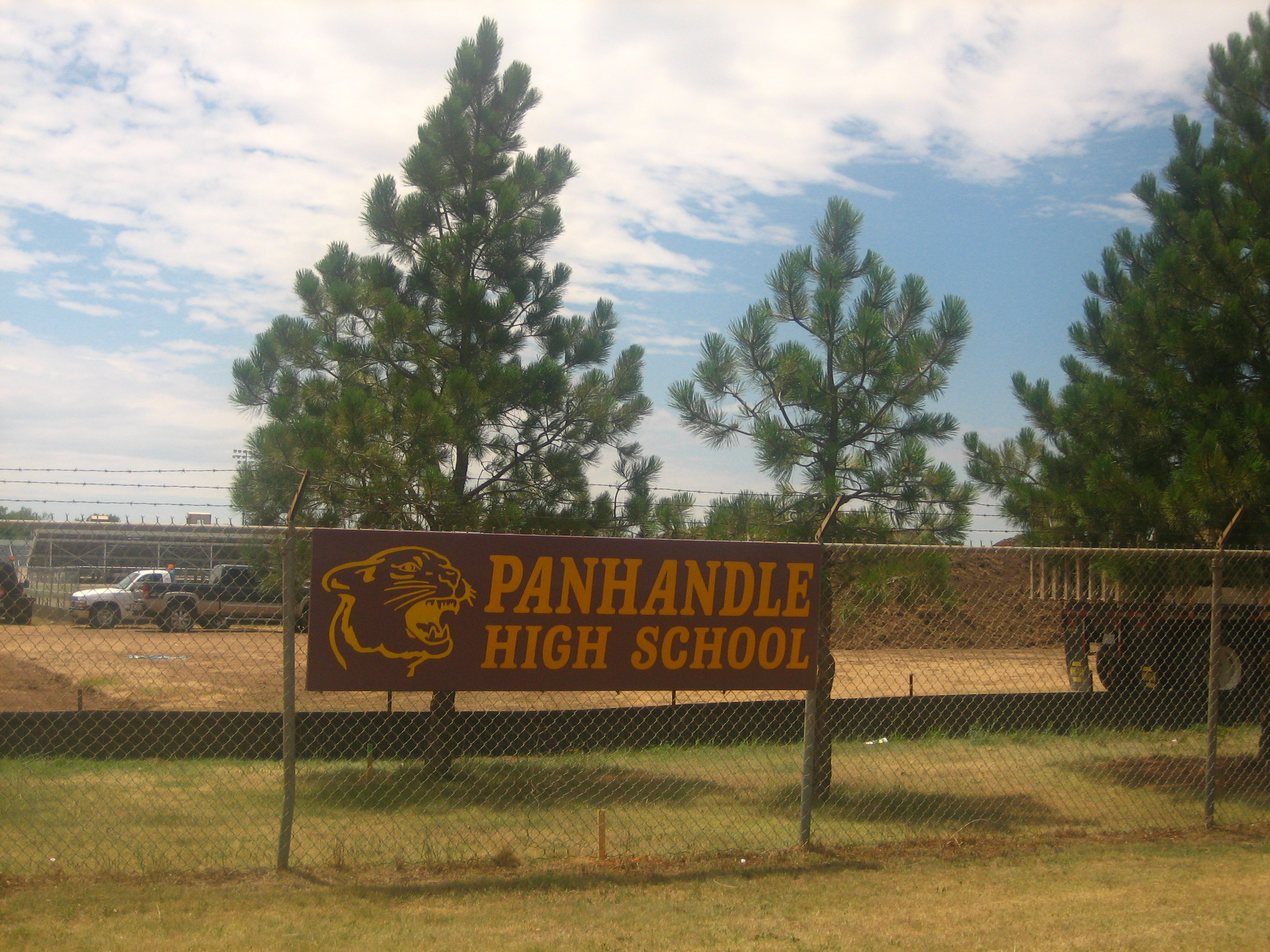
Panhandle High School

Panhandle is served by the Panhandle Independent School District. Panhandle High School is located here.
