= Panhandle Independent School District =

School district in Texas

Address
- 1001 Elsie St Panhandle, Texas, 79068-1030; United States

District information
- Type: Public
- Grades: PK–12
- Superintendent: Blair Brown
- Governing agency: Texas Education Agency
- Schools: 3
- NCES District ID: 4834230

Students and staff
- Enrollment: 657 (2022–2023)
- Teachers: 58.95 (on an FTE basis)
- Student–teacher ratio: 11.15

Other information
- Website: www.panhandleisd.net

Panhandle Independent School District is a public school district based in Panhandle, Texas (USA).

For the 2021-2022 school year, the school district was given an "A" by the Texas Education Agency.

== Schools ==
- Panhandle High School (Grades 9-12)
- Panhandle Junior High (Grades 6-8)
- Panhandle Elementary (Grades PK-5)
