= 1978 Texas Senate election =

- November 7, 1978

15 of the 31 seats in the Texas Senate 16 seats needed for a majority
	Majority party	Minority party
Party	Democratic	Republican
Last election	28	3
Seats before	27	4
Seats won	27	4
Seat change	Steady	Steady
Popular vote	637,452	149,855
Percentage	80.46%	18.92%
Swing	▲8.21%	▼8.75%
- Senate results by district Democratic hold Republican hold No election
President Pro Tempore before election
Democratic
Elected President Pro Tempore
Democratic

The 1978 Texas Senate elections took place as part of the biennial United States elections. Texas voters elected state senators 15 of the 31 State Senate districts. The winners of this election served in the 66th Texas Legislature for four-year terms.

== Background ==
Democrats had controlled the Texas Senate since the 1872 elections. Long a part of the Solid South, Republicans had gained a foothold in the state in the past two decades, electing U.S. Senator John Tower in 1961 and electing Richard Nixon with 66% of the vote in 1972, but these gains rarely made much impact in downballot, local races. Democrats had controlled every statewide office since the end of Reconstruction and controlled large supermajorities in the legislature. Even these small numbers were an improvement from the past two decades, however, such as after the 1964 election when they held a single seat in the House and none in the Senate.

=== District 31 special election ===
1977 31st district special election
- December 10, 1977
Nominee	Bob Price	Bob Simpson
Party	Republican	Democratic
Popular vote	15,199	14,958
Percentage	50.40%	49.60%
- County results Price: 50–60% 60–70% 70–80% Simpson: 50–60% 60–70% 70–80%
Texas Senator before election
Max Sherman
Democratic Party
Elected Texas Senator
Bob Price
Republican Party

Democrat Max Sherman resigned in September 1977, and a special election was called, to be held concurrently with the November general election. No candidate received a majority of the vote, so a runoff was held in December. Former Republican Congressman Bob Price narrowly won the runoff, flipping the seat.

1977 District 31 special election
Party	Candidate	Votes	%
Democratic	Bob Simpson	8,825	25.19%
Republican	Bob Price	8,079	23.06%
Republican	Jim Brandon	7,011	20.01%
Democratic	Mel Phillips Jr.	6,018	17.18%
Democratic	Burk Whittenburg	5,096	14.55%
Total votes		35,029	100.00%

1977 District 31 special election runoff
Party	Candidate	Votes	%
Republican	Bob Price	15,199	50.40%
Democratic	Bob Simpson	14,958	49.60%
Total votes		30,157	100.00%
Republican gain from Democratic			

== Results ==
Despite the upset victory of Republican Bill Clements in the concurrent gubernatorial election, Republicans made no gains in the chamber. They held the one seat the controlled prior to the election and flipped no others. Combined with their special election victory in District 31, they entered the 66th Legislature with four members, up one from the start of the 65th Legislature.

=== Results by district ===
District	Democratic		Republican		Raza Unida		Total		Result
District	Votes	%	Votes	%	Votes	%	Votes	%	Result
District 1	55,618	100.00%	-	-	-	-	55,618	100.00%	Democratic hold
District 2	55,625	100.00%	-	-	-	-	55,625	100.00%	Democratic hold
District 3	56,513	100.00%	-	-	-	-	56,513	100.00%	Democratic hold
District 6	7,299	100.00%	-	-	-	-	7,299	100.00%	Democratic hold
District 10	34,559	66.70%	17,251	33.30%	-	-	51,810	100.00%	Democratic hold
District 11	6,439	100.00%	-	-	-	-	6,439	100.00%	Democratic hold
District 12	35,429	46.76%	40,346	53.24%	-	-	75,775	100.00%	Republican hold
District 14	77,682	100.00%	-	-	-	-	77,682	100.00%	Democratic hold
District 21	52,937	61.71%	27,934	32.57%	4,908	5.72%	85,779	100.00%	Democratic hold
District 23	30,250	70.86%	12,438	29.14%	-	-	42,688	100.00%	Democratic hold
District 25	64,427	100.00%	-	-	-	-	64,427	100.00%	Democratic hold
District 26	43,379	64.05%	24,345	35.95%	-	-	67,724	100.00%	Democratic hold
District 27	36,442	100.00%	-	-	-	-	36,442	100.00%	Democratic hold
District 28	49,420	64.21%	27,541	35.79%	-	-	76,961	100.00%	Democratic hold
District 30	31,433	100.00%	-	-	-	-	31,433	100.00%	Democratic hold
Total	637,452	80.46%	149,855	18.92%	4,908	0.62%	792,215	100.00%	Source:
