= Tecovas =

Tecovas may refer to:

- Tecovas (company), an American retailer of cowboy boots and western apparel
- Tecovas Creek, a creek in Potter County, Texas, US
- Tecovas Formation, a geological formation in Texas

== See also ==
- Tecovasaurus, an extinct Late Triassic amniote genus
