= Michael M. Wood =

American diplomat

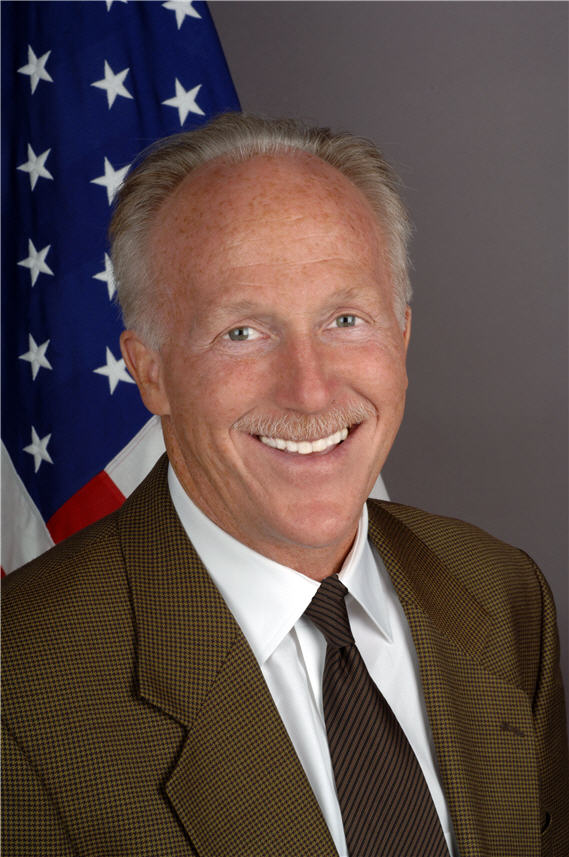

United States Ambassador to Sweden
- In office June 8, 2006 – June 20, 2009
- President: George W. Bush
- Preceded by: Teel Bivins
- Succeeded by: Matthew Barzun

Personal details
- Born: Michael Melville Wood c. 1947 (age 78–79)
- Education: Yale University (BA)

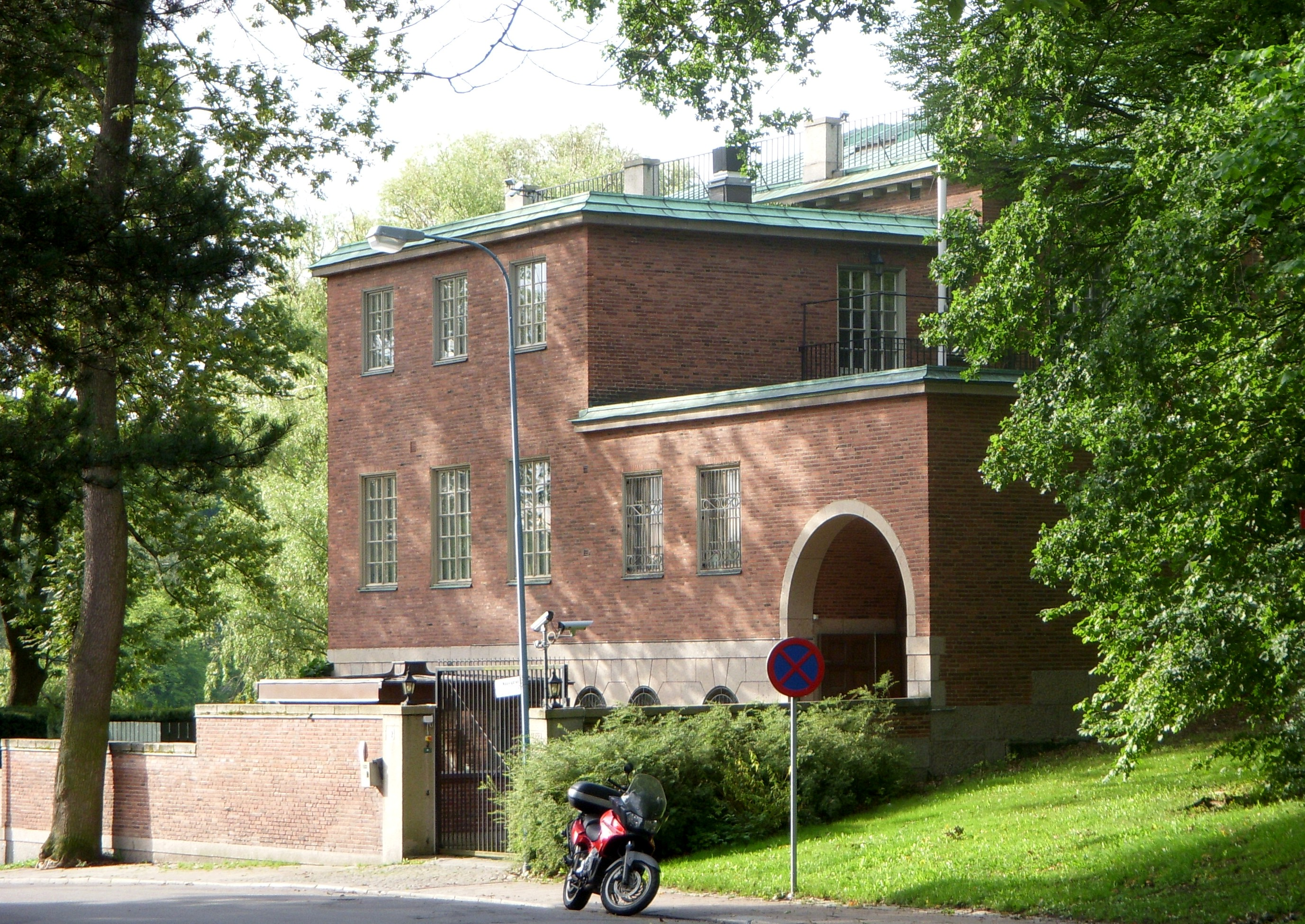
Villa Åkerlund, Wood's residency in Diplomatstaden, Stockholm

Michael Melville Wood (born 1947) is Chairman of Redwood Investments LLC, a Washington, D.C. investment company concentrating in media, real estate, and alternative energy. He is from Flint, Michigan. From 2006 to 2009 he was the United States Ambassador to Sweden.

== Early life and education ==
Wood was born in 1947. Wood attended Phillips Academy, and received his bachelor's degree at Yale University. At Yale he was a Delta Kappa Epsilon fraternity brother of George W. Bush.

== Career ==
Wood is the co-founder and former CEO of Hanley Wood, LLC. He stepped down as CEO after the company was sold to J.P. Morgan Partners, however he kept a seat on the Hanley Wood board.

On June 16, 2005, Wood was the recipient of the Top Executive of the Year Award from Media Business magazine.

Wood was co-founder and CEO of Hanley Wood LLC, the leading media company in the housing and construction industry and one of the ten largest business-to-business media companies in the U.S. Wood and private equity partner Veronis Suhler Stevenson sold Hanley Wood to J.P. Morgan Partners on August 1, 2005.

Wood was sworn in as the United States ambassador to Sweden on June 5, 2006. Shortly after being sworn, he announced that his top priority was cooperation between the U.S. and Sweden in alternative energy technology. During his three years in Sweden he traveled to all 21 län (counties) looking for alternative energy companies that could benefit from cooperation with American venture capital and research institutions. The Ambassador’s list of the best of these Swedish companies contains 52 firms and the embassy estimates the resulting volume of activity between Swedish firms and US interests is $150–200MM. The most important results were in biofuels, automotive engine technology, and alternative jet fuel. He resigned on January 20, 2009, when President George W. Bush left office. He returned to private life and his work with Redwood Investments.

In recognition for this work, on May 4, 2009, His Majesty The King of Sweden made Wood a Commander Grand Cross of the Royal Order of the Polar Star, an order of merit given by the Cabinet of Sweden to foreign citizens and stateless individuals who have made significant contributions to Sweden.

On February 6, 2009, in a ceremony at the House of Sweden in Washington, Wood was presented the William Wachtmeister Award for advancing Swedish-American relations. On October 22, 2008, Swedish Deputy Prime Minister Maud Olofsson presented Wood the ESBRI Award for the person who has done the most for entrepreneurship in Sweden.

== Personal life ==
He and his wife, Judy, have two adult children and Eight grandchildren.

Diplomatic posts
Preceded by Teel Bivins	U.S. Ambassador to Sweden; 2006–2009	Succeeded by Matthew Barzun
