= Bivin =

Bivin may refer to:

- Bivin (surname)
- Bivin of Gorze (810–863), Frankish lay abbot
- USS Bivin (DE-536), a US Navy destroyer escort named after Vernard Eugene Bivin

== See also ==
- Bivins
