= Warren W. Wetsel =

American politician (1849–1928)

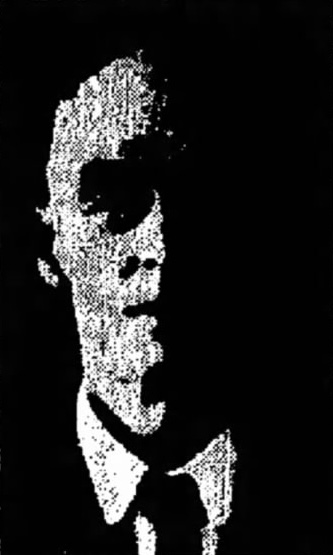

1st Mayor of Amarillo
- In office February 1892 – 1894
- Preceded by: Position established
- Succeeded by: R. L. Stringfellow

Personal details
- Born: February 25, 1849; Cobleskill, New York, US
- Died: November 29, 1928 (aged 79)
- Spouse: Katherine Fitzgerald
- Children: 2

Warren W. Wetsel (February 25 1849 – November 29 1928) was an American rancher and politician. He served as the first mayor of Amarillo, Texas between 1892 and 1894.

== Biography ==
Wetsel was born on February 25, 1849, in Cobleskill, New York. In 1881, Wetsel was hired by Henry B. Sanborn to help fence the Frying Pan Ranch, at this time he was residing in Sherman, and he used the wages to bring his wife from New York. He died on November 29, 1928, aged 79.
