= Harpole (surname) =

Harpole is a surname. Notable people with the surname include:

- Charles Harpole, American scholar of cinema and mass communications and filmmaker
- Paul Harpole (born 1950), American politician and businessman
