= Bivins =

Bivins is a surname. Notable people with the surname include:

- Charlie Bivins (1938–1994), American football player
- Jimmy Bivins (1919–2012), American boxer
- Lee Bivins (1862–1929), American rancher, oilman, and politician
- Michael Bivins (born 1968), musician, New Edition and Bell Biv DeVoe
- Teel Bivins (1947–2009), American politician and diplomat from Texas
- Terry Bivins (born 1943), American NASCAR driver
- Tim Bivins (born 1952), American politician from Illinois

== See also ==
- Bivin (disambiguation)
