= Kel Seliger =

American politician (born 1953)

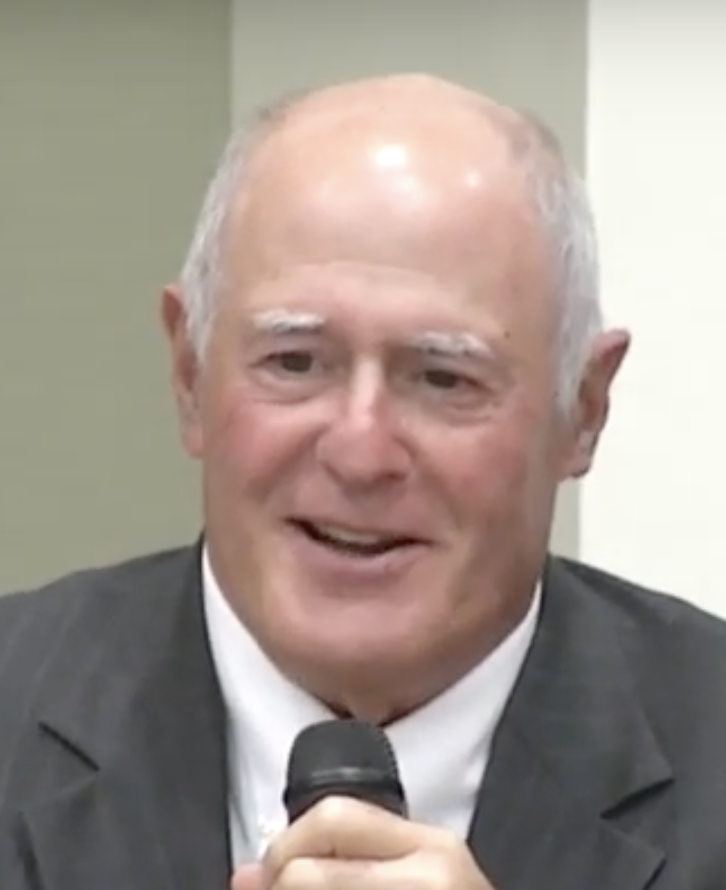

President pro tempore of the Texas Senate
- In office January 10, 2017 – May 29, 2017
- Preceded by: Kevin Eltife
- Succeeded by: Robert Nichols

Member of the Texas Senate from the 31st district
- In office March 2, 2004 – January 10, 2023
- Preceded by: Teel Bivins
- Succeeded by: Kevin Sparks

Mayor of Amarillo
- In office 1993–2001
- Preceded by: Keith Adams
- Succeeded by: Trent Sisemore

Personal details
- Born: Kelton Gray Seliger; June 16, 1953 (age 73) Amarillo, Texas, U.S.
- Party: Republican
- Spouse: Nancy Seliger
- Children: 2
- Education: Dartmouth College (BA)

Kelton Gray Seliger (born June 16, 1953) is an American politician who represented the 31st district in the Texas Senate from 2004 to 2023. A member of the Republican Party, he served as the 30th mayor of Amarillo from 1993 to 2001 and as president pro tempore of the Texas Senate in 2017.

== Background ==
Born in Amarillo and reared in the Panhandle city of Borger in Hutchinson County, Seliger is a graduate of Borger public schools and Dartmouth College. He spent 35 years in the steel industry and is co-owner and executive vice-president of Lake Steel, Inc., a steel service center. He is also a licensed commercial pilot and flight instructor.

Seliger is currently a member of the National Rifle Association of America, the Texas Farm Bureau, and the Harley-Davidson Owners Group.

Seliger and his wife, the former Nancy Caroline Meredith (born October 11, 1960), reside in Amarillo with their two sons, Jonathan and Matthew.

== Political life ==
Seliger served four terms in the nonpartisan position as mayor of Amarillo (1993–2001). He was the first Jewish mayor of the city. He is also a former city commissioner and a former member of the Amarillo Civil Service Commission. He served on former Texas Attorney General John Cornyn's Municipal Advisory Committee and, in 2002, he was appointed to the Texas Alcoholic Beverage Commission by Governor Rick Perry.

Seliger was sworn into the Texas Senate on March 2, 2004, to complete the term of Teel Bivins of Amarillo, who obtained a diplomatic appointment as United States Ambassador to Sweden from the administration of U.S. President George W. Bush. Seliger was reelected to serve a full, four-year term on November 4, 2004. The district spans twenty-six counties and serves large slices of the Panhandle and Permian Basin, including Amarillo, Midland, Odessa, and Big Spring. It is one of the most Republican districts in the state; he has only faced a Democratic opponent once, during his first bid for a full term in 2004.

Seliger is a member of the American Legislative Exchange Council (ALEC), serving as Texas state leader.

Seliger was appointed by Lieutenant Governor David Dewhurst to serve as Vice-Chair of the Criminal Justice Committee for the Seventy-ninth Texas Legislature. In addition, he was appointed to the Natural Resources, International Relations and Trade, and Administration Committees.

Seliger filed and sponsored over seventy-five bills, fifty of which were passed in one form or another during the regular session of the 79th Legislature. As the vice chairman of the Senate Criminal Justice Committee, Senator Seliger passed House Bill 2577 requiring local law enforcement agencies to report to the state the reason for a peace officer's termination to protect the integrity of the state's law enforcement officers. This legislation prevents those peace officers with a history of poor performance or unethical behavior, termed "gypsy cops," from taking advantage of police departments that lack the resources to investigate their employment history.

Seliger's membership on the Senate Natural Resources Committee aided him in passing several important bills for West Texas. House Bill 2161 ensures that effective pipeline safety standards are in place for all construction work around oil and gas pipelines. It also establishes a program to address abandoned or orphaned oil and gas wells and includes considerations for potential future periods of decline in oil and gas prices. Additionally, House Bill 951 will establish a notice and remediation process for construction around pipelines.

The Texas Municipal League presented Seliger with its 2005 Distinguished Legislative Service Award for his dedication to protecting and promoting local control. He also received the 2005 Rural Legislator of the Year Award from the Association of Rural Communities in Texas.

Seliger won re-nomination to a full four-year term in the state Senate in the Republican primary held on March 4, 2014. He defeated attorney and former Midland Mayor Michael Jackson "Mike" Canon, Sr. (born 1946), 36,623 (52.4 percent) to 33,223 (47.6 percent).

Seliger is the recipient of the Bell Helicopter 2012 Legislative Leadership Award, the Texas Municipal League's 2011 Legislator of the Year, the Texas District and County Attorneys Association's 2009 Law and Order Award, Legislator of the Year 2009 from the Associated Security Services and Investigators of the State of Texas. The citizens of Odessa honored him with the 2009 Heritage of Odessa Foundation Community Statesman Award in Government.

In the general election held on November 6, 2018, Seliger handily prevailed over his only opponent, the Libertarian Jack B . Westbrook, 171,831 votes (87.5 percent) to 24,458 (12.5 percent). No Democrat sought the seat.

Seliger was a moderate Republican by Texas standards, giving him significant clout in the state Senate. He could join with the body's Democrats to block conservative initiatives from coming to the floor. In 2019, Seliger announced opposition to the property tax relief package offered by Lieutenant Governor Dan Patrick, Governor Greg Abbott, and House Speaker Dennis Bonnen, who maintain that the issue of runaway property taxes has reached emergency status. Seliger said that municipalities and counties should be able to set their own rates in conjunction with value estimates from the appraisal boards and the will of local voters. Under the measure, counties with more than $15 million in combined property and sales taxes must obtain voter approval for any increase in property taxes greater than 2.5 percent of the current year rates.

In 2019, he was the sole Republican in the Senate to oppose a religious refusals bill, commenting, "When you're the only Jew on the floor ... it’s a different shade on your opinion."

On October 20, 2021, Seliger announced he would not be running for re-election. He made this decision after his already heavily Republican district became even more so in redistricting. Also, two primary opponents announced their intention to run against him, his first substantive primary opposition in some time. They included Midland oil businessman Kevin Sparks and Big Spring steel business owner Stormy Bradley, who is also a school board member. Sparks was endorsed by former President Donald Trump.

=== Removal from Agriculture Committee chairmanship ===
On January 22, 2019, Seliger was removed as chair of the Texas Senate Agriculture Committee after suggesting that a female staffer at the Capitol in Austin kiss his posterior. Seliger previously complained that he had been named the chair of the Agriculture Committee. A senior staffer for Lieutenant Governor Patrick, Sherry Sylvester, responded to Seliger's complaint by stating that if Seliger believed being chair of Agriculture was beneath him then he should step down and let Patrick appoint someone else to the job. On the radio show, "Other Side of Texas," Seliger said, "It was extremely snide and really unbecoming for a member of the staff, the lieutenant governor’s or my staff. I didn’t say anything of the sort, and that assertion is disingenuous and I have a recommendation for Miss Sylvester and her lips and my back end." Patrick then removed Seliger from the chairmanship after Seliger was given forty-eight hours by Patrick to apologize to the female staffer. Seliger refused to make the apology. Patrick then awarded the chairmanship of the Agriculture committee to state Senator Bob Hall.

== Election history ==
Election history of District 31 from 1992.

=== 2018 ===
Republican primary
Party	Candidate	Votes	%
Republican	Kel Seliger (incumbent)	40,664	50.4
Republican	Mike Canon	25,335	31.4
Republican	Victor Leal	14,671	18.2
Total votes		80,670	100.0

Texas's 31st State Senate District General Election, 2018
Party	Candidate	Votes	%
Republican	Kel Seliger (incumbent)	174,367	87.52
Libertarian	Jack Westbrook	24,869	12.48
Total votes		199,236	100.0
Republican hold			

=== 2014 ===
Texas general election, 2014: Senate District 31
Party	Candidate	Votes	%	±%
Republican	Kel Seliger (Incumbent)	107,885	90.43	−9.57
Libertarian	Steven Gibson	11,416	9.57	+9.57
Majority		96,469		
Turnout				
Republican hold				

=== 2012 ===
Texas general election, 2012: Senate District 31
Party	Candidate	Votes	%	±%
Republican	Kel Seliger (Incumbent)	195,878	100.0	+9.79
Majority		195,878		
Turnout				
Republican hold				

=== 2008 ===
Texas general election, 2008: Senate District 31
Party	Candidate	Votes	%	±%
Republican	Kel Seliger (Incumbent)	180,267	90.21	
Libertarian	Lauren Poindexter	19,569	9.79	
Majority		160,698		
Turnout				
Republican hold				

=== 2004 ===
Texas general election, 2004: Senate District 31
Party	Candidate	Votes	%	±%
Republican	Kel Seliger (Incumbent)	170,299	78.53	−21.47
Democratic	Elaine King Miller	46,556	21.47	+21.47
Majority		123,743	57.06	−42.94
Turnout		216,855		+82.33
Republican hold				

=== 2004 ===
Special Election Runoff: Senate District 31, Unexpired Term 17 February 2004
Party	Candidate	Votes	%	±%
Republican	Kirk Edwards	32,094	43.85	'"`UNIQ−−ref−00000068−QINU`"'+43.85
Republican	Kel Seliger	41,102	56.15	+20.44
Majority		9,008	12.31	
Turnout		73,196		
Republican hold				

Special Election: Senate District 31, Unexpired Term 20 January 2004
Party	Candidate	Votes	%	±%
Republican	Bob Barnes	9,478	13.65	
Republican	Kirk Edwards	14,273	20.56	
Republican	Lee Gibson	2,429	3.50	
Democratic	Elaine King Miller	5,738	8.27	
Republican	Jesse Quackenbush	1,488	2.14	
Republican	Kel Seliger	24,793	35.72	
Republican	Don Sparks	11,216	16.16	
Turnout				

Political offices
Preceded by Keith Adams	Mayor of Amarillo; 1993–2001	Succeeded by Trent Sisemore
Texas Senate
Preceded by Kevin Eltife	President pro tempore of the Texas Senate; 2017	Succeeded by Robert Nichols
