= Tecovas (company) =

American clothing company

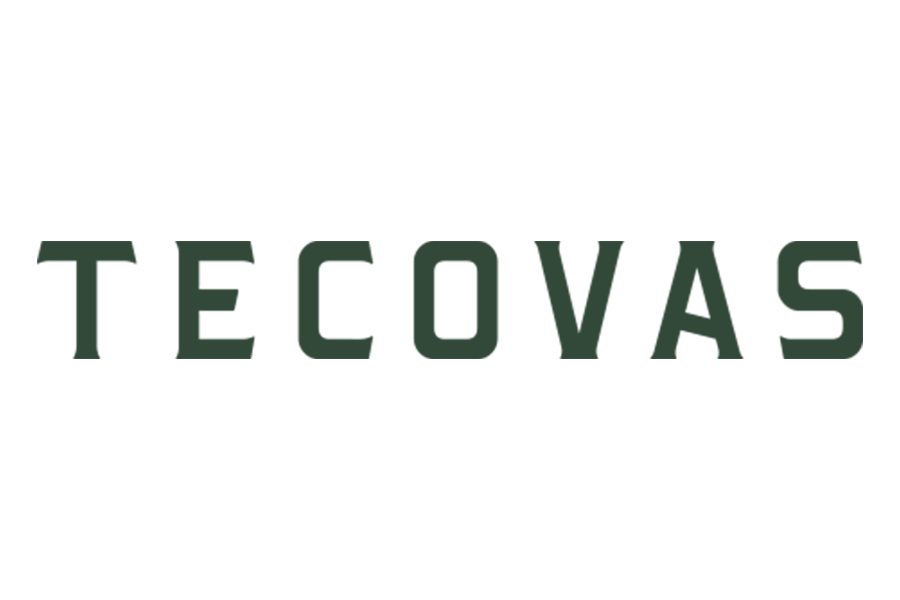
- Industry: Retail
- Founded: 2015; 11 years ago
- Founder: Paul Hedrick
- Headquarters: Austin, Texas, U.S.
- Number of locations: 56
- Key people: David Lafitte (CEO)
- Products: Western wear
- Number of employees: 600
- Website: www.tecovas.com

Tecovas is an American retailer of cowboy boots and Western-style apparel. The company got its start as a direct-to-consumer business and is headquartered in Austin, Texas. Along with cowboy boots, Tecovas also sells apparel, accessories such as hats, and other goods.

== History ==
Paul Hedrick, a Texas native, graduated from Harvard and began working as a management consultant in Greenwich, Connecticut, where he found it difficult to purchase cowboy boots. He started designing and manufacturing boots in León, Mexico, before launching the online retailer in 2015. The company is named for the geological formation Tecovas Creek, allegedly due to the founder's dream of becoming a paleontologist.

Tecovas began opening brick and mortar stores in 2019 and has locations in several states.

== Sponsorship ==
Tecovas is the official cowboy-boot sponsor of the Austin Gamblers, New York Mavericks, and Missouri Thunder, three of 10 bull riding teams in the Professional Bull Riders (PBR) Team Series held every summer through autumn in the United States since 2022.

In 2024, Tecovas became the first official boot sponsor of the Stagecoach country music festival. Tecovas was also a sponsor of the Opry NextStage, an 11-month program designed to invest in emerging country music artists. During that same year, Tecovas also began selling its products through wholesale partnerships with independent Western wear retailers, marking the company's first move beyond its direct-to-consumer model.

In 2025, Tecovas collaborated with restaurant chain Chili's to create a limited edition pair of red cowboy boots, cobbled with the same material as the booths at Chili's.

In 2026, Tecovas announced a retail partnership with Bass Pro Shops. Select locations will have a full Tecovas experience built into the store.
