= Mayor of Amarillo =

Chief administrative officer of the city of Amarillo, Texas

Mayor of the City of Amarillo
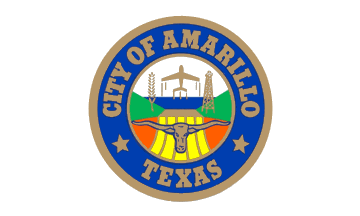
- Flag of the City of Amarillo
- Incumbent; Cole Stanley since May 15, 2023
- Government of Amarillo, Texas
- Term length: Two years
- Inaugural holder: Warren W. Wetsel
- Formation: January 1892; 134 years ago
- Website: www.amarillo.gov

The mayor of the City of Amarillo is the chief executive officer of the city of Amarillo, Texas. The current mayor is Cole Stanley, who was elected on May 6, 2023, and took office on May 15 of that month.

== List of mayors of Amarillo ==
No.	Portrait	Name	Term in office	Length of service	Previous office
1		Warren W. Wetsel (1849–1928; aged 79)	February, 1892 – 1894	2 years	None
government enjoined (1894–1899)
2		R. L. Stringfellow (1854–1909; aged 55)	1899 – 1902	3 years	None
3		Stafford Lightburne (1854–1927; aged 72)	1902 – 1906	4 years	None
4		Will A. Miller Jr. (1871–1930; aged 58)	1906 – April, 1908	2 years	None
5		Lon D. Marrs (1858–1943; aged 84)	April, 1908 – April 23, 1910	2 years	Potter County Attorney (1890–1896); Member of the Potter County Court (1896–1904)
6		James H. Patton (1861–1943; aged 82)	April 23, 1910 – April, 1912	2 years	None
7		W. E. Gee (1872–1952; aged 79)	April, 1912 – December, 1914	1 year, 8 months	City attorney of Amarillo (1902–1908)
8		J. N. Beasley (1878–1963; aged 84)	December, 1913 – 1917	3 years	Member of Shelby County, Tennessee Court until 1910
9		Lon D. Marrs (1858–1943; aged 83)	1917 – 1923	6 years	Potter County Attorney (1890–1896); Member of the Potter County Court (1896–1904); Mayor of Amarillo (1908–1910)
10		E. S. Blasdel (1878–1930; aged 51)	1923 – April, 1925	2 years	None
11		Lee Bivins † (1862–1829; aged 66)	April, 1925 – January 17, 1929	3 years, 9 months	None
12		Ernest O. Thompson (1892–1966; aged 74)	April, 1929 – May 31, 1932	3 years, 1 month	None
13		Ross D. Rogers (1889–1974; aged 84)	July 19, 1932 – April 14, 1941	8 years, 9 months	None
14		Joe A. Jenkins (1895–1981; aged 85)	April 14, 1941 – May 5, 1947	6 years	Member of the Amarillo City Commission (1935–1941)
15		Lawrence R. Hagy (1899–1993; aged 94)	May 5, 1947 – May 2, 1949	2 years	None
16		E. H. Klein (1908–1989; aged 81)	May 2, 1949 – April, 1953		None
17		S. T. Curtis (1907–1993; aged 85)	April, 1953 – April, 1955	2 years	
18		R. C. Jordan (1909–1985; aged 76)	April, 1955 – April 15, 1957	2 years	
19		John R. Armstrong (1900–1969; aged 68)	April 15, 1957 – May 4, 1959	2 years	None
20		A. F. Madison (1896–1972; aged 76)	May 4, 1959 – May 8, 1961	2 years	None
21		Jack Seale (1927–2018; aged 90)	May 8, 1961 – April 29, 1963	2 years	None
22		F. V. Wallace (1908–1980; aged 75)	April 29, 1963 – May 8, 1967	4 years	None
23		J. Ernest Stroud (1912–2005; aged 92)	May 8, 1967 – May 10, 1971	4 years	None
24		L. Ray Vahue (1929–1978; aged 48)	May 10, 1971 – May 12, 1975	4 years	Member of the Amarillo City Commission (1877–1879)
25		John C. Drummond (1905–1982; aged 76)	May 12, 1975 – May 2, 1977	2 years	None
26		Jerry H. Hodge (born 1942-2024; aged 81)	May 2, 1977 – May 4, 1981	4 years	Member of the Amarillo City Commission (1973–1977)
27		Rick Klein (1943–1997; aged 54)	May 4, 1981 – April, 1987	6 years	None
28		Glen Parkey (1936–2023; aged 87)	April, 1987 – 1989	2 years	None
29		Keith Adams (1940–2015; aged 75)	1989 – 1993	4 years	Member of the Amarillo City Commission (1983–1989)
30		Kel Seliger (born 1953; age 73)	1993 – 2001	8 years	Member of the Amarillo City Commission
31		Trent Sisemore (born 1961; age 65)	2001 – 2005	4 years	Member of the Amarillo City Commission (1995–2001)
32		Debra McCartt (born 1950; age 76)	2005 – May, 2011	6 years	Member of the Amarillo City Commission
33		Paul Harpole (born 1950; age 75–76)	May, 2011 – May 16, 2017	8 years	Member of the Amarillo City Commission (2005–2007)
34		Ginger Nelson (born 1970; age 55)	May 16, 2017 – May 16, 2023	6 years	Member of the Amarillo City Commission (2012–2016)
35		Cole Stanley (born 1978; age 48)	May 16, 2023 – Incumbent	3 years, 114 days	None
