= Bivin (surname) =

Bivin is a surname. Notable people with the surname include:

- David Bivin (born 1939), Israeli-American biblical scholar and author
- Jim Bivin (1909–1982), American baseball player and manager

== See also ==
- Bivins
