= Matthew Barzun =

American diplomat

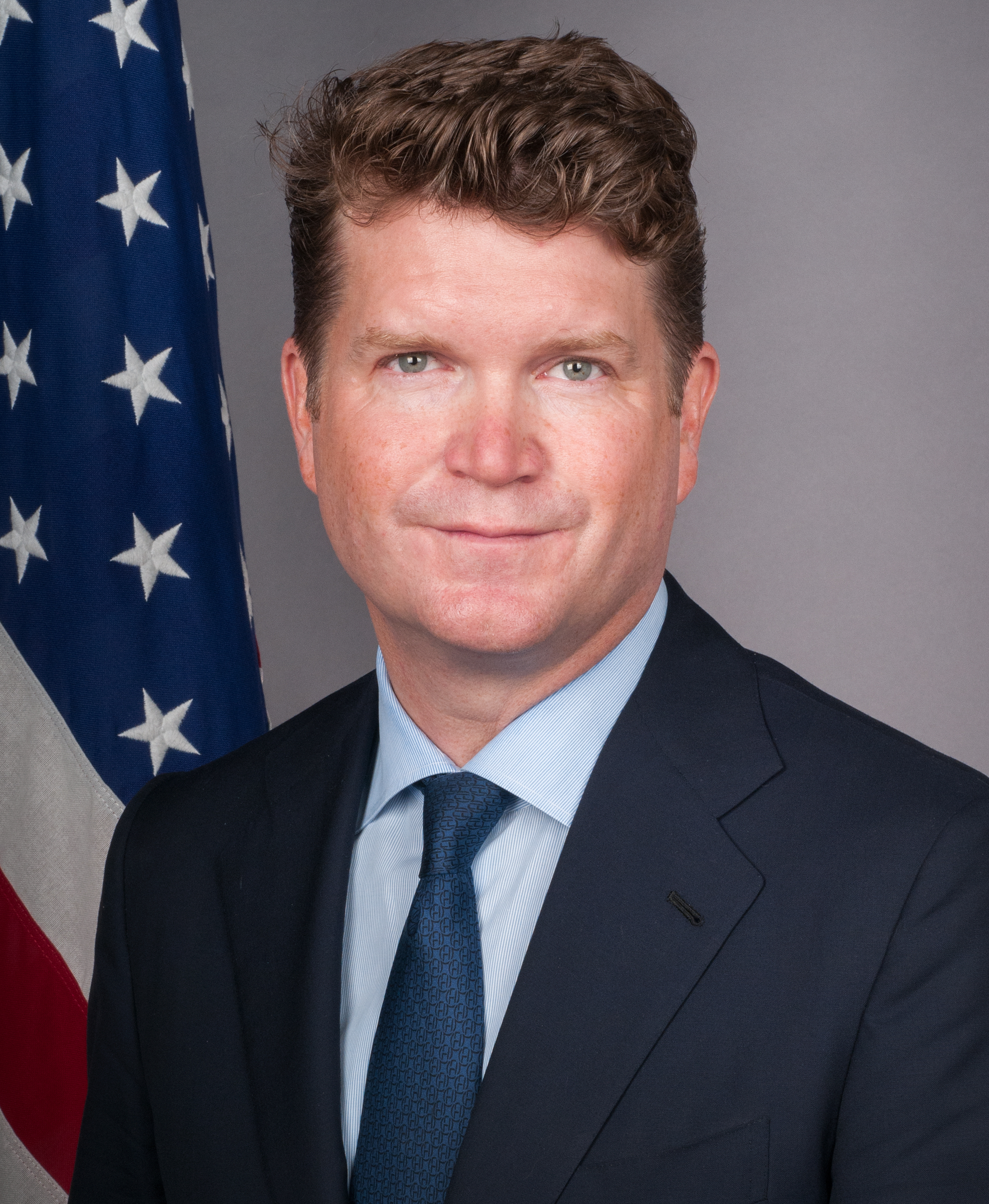

65th United States Ambassador to the United Kingdom
- In office December 4, 2013 – January 18, 2017
- President: Barack Obama
- Preceded by: Louis Susman
- Succeeded by: Woody Johnson

United States Ambassador to Sweden
- In office August 21, 2009 – May 28, 2011
- President: Barack Obama
- Preceded by: Michael M. Wood
- Succeeded by: Mark Brzezinski

Personal details
- Born: Matthew Winthrop Barzun; October 23, 1970 (age 55) New York City, New York, U.S.
- Party: Democratic
- Spouse: Brooke Brown (m. 1999)
- Children: 3
- Relatives: Lucy Barzun Donnelly (sister); Jacques Barzun (grandfather)
- Education: Harvard University (AB)
- Website: matthewbarzun.com

Matthew Winthrop Barzun (born October 23, 1970) is an American businessman, diplomat and political fundraiser who served as United States Ambassador to Sweden from 2009 to 2011, and the United States Ambassador to the United Kingdom from 2013 to 2017. He is a business executive who is known for his work with CNET Networks and for his fundraising work on Barack Obama's 2008 presidential campaign. He was selected by President Barack Obama as National Finance Chair for the president's 2012 re-election campaign. He is author of The Power of Giving Away Power from Optimism Press, an imprint of Penguin Random House.

== Early life and education ==
Barzun was born in New York City. He grew up in Lincoln, Massachusetts and attended St. Paul's School, Concord, New Hampshire. He received his Bachelor of Arts in history and literature magna cum laude from Harvard College in 1993. In his testimony to the Senate during his confirmation vetting, Barzun noted that he had served as a summer intern to Massachusetts Senator John Kerry in 1989. He holds honorary degrees from University of Warwick and De Montfort University and an honorary fellowship from University College London.

== Career ==
After graduating from Harvard College, he began working with CNET Networks.

=== 2008 Obama campaign ===
In The Audacity to Win, author and political strategist David Plouffe describes Matthew Barzun's grassroots campaign idea as "citizen fundraisers" that drove Obama's connection with supporters.

=== Diplomacy ===
The Senate Committee on Foreign Relations, chaired by Senator John Kerry, approved Barzun's nomination as Ambassador to Sweden during the week of August 3, 2009, and the nomination was confirmed on August 7. Barzun was sworn in as U.S. Ambassador to the Kingdom of Sweden on August 12, 2009, and presented his credentials to King Carl XVI Gustaf on August 21, 2009. Barzun prioritized outreach and personal engagement, launching the U.S. Embassy Road Show that brings embassy personnel, resources, and exhibits out of Stockholm to smaller cities and towns. In partnership with the Swedish government, he also created the Swedish American Green Alliance where Swedes and Americans share news and ideas toward a clean energy future.

President Obama nominated Barzun to be the United States Ambassador to the United Kingdom in 2013. The Senate confirmed him by unanimous consent on August 1, 2013. He presented his credentials to Queen Elizabeth II on November 27, 2013. Barzun set up the Young Leaders UK (YLUK) programme whilst in office, which allowed him to communicate and speak with young people from across the United Kingdom. YLUK met with President Obama during his visit to the UK in 2016. Barzun was selected by the U.S. Department of State as the winner of the 2016 Sue M. Cobb Award for Exemplary Diplomatic Service for "his passion and commitment during his tenure in London by promoting American values and ideals, and his dedication to developing the next generation of career Foreign Service Officers."

In January 2017, Barzun announced that he was to leave as Ambassador before Donald Trump took office. Barzun left the UK on 18 January 2017, moving back to Kentucky. The then Deputy Chief of Mission, Lewis Lukens, then succeeded Barzun as Chargé d'affaires pending the appointment of a new ambassador. Upon his return to the United States, he received the Marshall Medal from the Marshall Aid Commemoration Commission created by the British Parliament for his dedication to strengthening U.S. and British relations. And he serves on the board of the National Constitution Center.

=== The Power of Giving Away Power ===
On June 1, 2021, Penguin Random House (Optimism Press) published Barzun's book The Power of Giving Away Power: How the Best Leaders Learn to Let Go. The leadership book describes how to create a culture of collaboration by adopting the habits and behaviors of interdependence. Leaders profiled include Mary Parker Follett, John Gilbert Winant, Dee Hock, and Jane Jacobs.

=== Media ===
Barzun co-founded Tortoise Media in 2018 with James Harding and Katie Vanneck-Smith. As of January 2021, the outlet had nearly 50,000 paid-for subscribers Also in 2018, Barzun acquired Louisville Magazine and is the magazine's publisher.

== Personal life ==
Matthew Barzun is a descendant of Lucretia Mott, a proponent of women's rights, John Winthrop, founder of the Massachusetts Bay Colony and the city of Boston, and A. Lawrence Lowell, former president of Harvard University. His grandfather was the renowned French-born American cultural historian and former Columbia University professor, Jacques Barzun. He is the second of four children. His younger sister is film producer Lucy Barzun Donnelly, Emmy and Golden Globe winner for her work producing Grey Gardens for HBO.

His younger brother, Charles Barzun, is a tenured professor of law at the University of Virginia School of Law. His older sister, Mariana Barzun, is Executive Director of the Office of Philanthropy in the Mayor's Office in Louisville, KY.

Barzun is married to Brooke Brown Barzun, heiress of the Brown-Forman Corporation distilling empire, which includes the brands Jack Daniel's and Woodford Reserve. They live in Louisville, Kentucky, Brooke's hometown, and have three children.

Diplomatic posts
Preceded by Michael Wood	United States Ambassador to Sweden; 2009–2011	Succeeded by Mark Brzezinski
Preceded by Louis Susman	United States Ambassador to the United Kingdom; 2013–2017	Succeeded by Lewis Lukens; Acting
