= Frying Pan Ranch =

Coordinates: 35.2584°N 102.1082°W

Location in Texas

The Frying Pan Ranch is a historic ranch in Potter County, Texas. Tecovas Creek, a tributary of the Canadian River, flows through the ranch.

== History ==
The ranch was established in 1881 by Henry B. Sanborn and William Henry Bush, two employees of Joseph Glidden, the inventor of barbed wire. Glidden was looking for a place to test his new invention. Henry Sanborn was his sales agent. The men bought 95 sections of land in southeastern Potter County. Warren W. Wetsel helped with the fencing, and for some years, his wife, Kate, was the only woman living in Potter County.

Eventually, the partnership between Glidden and Sanborn ended. Glidden transferred his land holdings to his son-in-law, William Henry Bush. The land has been passed down through the family.

In 1944, Carol Sobieski's parents, Frank Thomas O'Brien a lawyer and his wife Emeline (nee Bush) O'Brien a politician and teacher, took over its operation.
