= Brooke Barzun =

American art curator and philanthropist

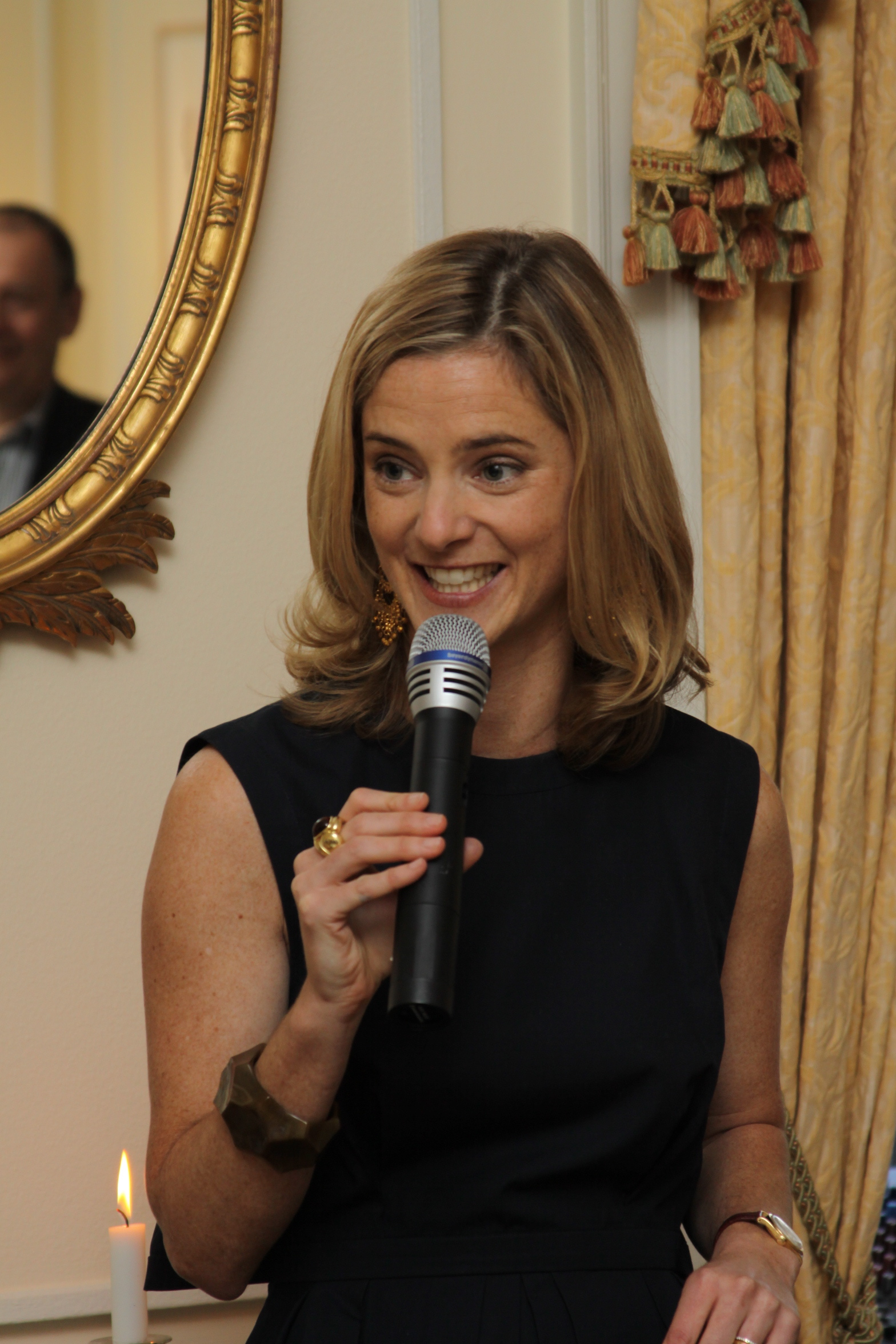
- Born: Brooke Lee Brown; June 18, 1972 (age 52); Louisville, Kentucky, United States
- Occupation(s): Art curator and philanthropist
- Spouse: Matthew Barzun

Brooke Barzun (born Brooke Lee Brown; June 18, 1972) is an art curator and philanthropist based in Louisville, Kentucky with her husband, Matthew Barzun, the former United States Ambassador to the United Kingdom and Sweden.

== Early life ==
She is the daughter of Owsley Brown II and Christy Brown, and the granddaughter of Sally Brown. Her extended family has voting control of Brown-Forman Corporation, the parent company of Jack Daniel's whiskey and other brands.

Barzun grew up in Louisville, Kentucky and attended Westover School (Connecticut) and Lake Forest College (Illinois). She received her master's degree in marriage, family and child counseling at Notre Dame De Namur University (California) with an emphasis in art therapy.

== Diplomatic spouse career ==
In Sweden, where she lived with her husband the US Ambassador from 2009 to 2011, Barzun led cultural diplomacy efforts. She led the curation of three contemporary art shows: a show of Swedish art at the American residence, a show entitled Transparency and Trans-formations in contemporary American Art featuring American art in coordination with U.S. Department of State's Art in Embassies program and artwithoutwalls, and Underglow, a public art installation by artist Chris Doyle. She was a common presence at cultural events in Stockholm.

In London, where her husband served as Ambassador 2013–2017, she continued her cultural diplomacy, joining the Royal Academy of Arts Development Trust.

== Cultural leadership in Louisville ==
In the fall of 2011, after the death of her father, Owsley Brown II, a devoted patron of the arts in Louisville, Barzun joined the board of Louisville's Speed Art Museum and set about completing the capital campaign Brown had begun for a major expansion. Barzun took over as co-chair and completed "phase 2" of fundraising for the project. She was then named co-chair for the third and final phase. In May 2013, it was announced that the fundraising goal had been met years ahead of schedule. The effort "[put] us five to 10 years ahead of where we thought we would be in completing the master plan," according to Speed board president Allan Latts, and reduced the project's original budget by $20 million because of cost savings captured from an accelerated construction timetable.
