= Kevin Sparks =

American politician

Member of the Texas Senate from the 31st district
- Incumbent
- Assumed office January 10, 2023
- Preceded by: Kel Seliger

Personal details
- Born: May 10, 1964 (age 62) Virginia
- Party: Republican
- Education: University of Texas, Austin (BBA)
- Occupation: Oil and gas operator
- Website: Office website Campaign website

Kevin Don Sparks (born May 10, 1964) is an American businessman and politician serving in the Texas Senate for the 31st District since 2023. A Republican, Sparks won the Texas Panhandle and Permian Basin seat unopposed in 2022, where incumbent Republican Kel Seliger announced his retirement.

== Early life and education ==
Sparks was raised in Midland, Texas, and graduated from the University of Texas at Austin with a Bachelor of Business Administration degree in May 1987. He received the Eagle Scout rank from the Boy Scouts of America in 1978.

== Career ==
=== Oil ===
Sparks is president and CEO of Discovery Operating, Inc, a family-owned and operated oil and gas company in Midland. He has previously served as a board member of the Natural Gas Producers Association and the Texas Public Policy Foundation.

=== Politics ===
Sparks announced a primary campaign against incumbent Republican Kel Seliger, regarded as a more moderate member of the Republican caucus, in 2022. He was endorsed by former President Donald Trump, United States Senator Ted Cruz, as well as Texas Lieutenant Governor Dan Patrick and quickly became the seat's frontrunner after Seliger announced his retirement. He won the Republican primary in March with over 50% of the vote, avoiding a runoff, and faced no Democratic opponent in the general election in November.

== Election history ==
=== 2022 ===
Texas's 31st State Senate District Election, 2022 (Note: In September 2022, the Texas Secretary of State declared multiple candidates who were running unopposed "elected" and as such they did not appear on the ballot.)
Primary election
Party	Candidate	Votes	%
Republican	Kevin Sparks	45,867	54.9
Republican	Tim Reid	19,039	22.8
Republican	Stormy Bradley	13,573	16.2
Republican	Jesse Quackenbush	5,101	6.1
Total votes		83,580	100.0
General election
Republican	Kevin Sparks	Unopposed	
Republican hold			
