= William Henry Bush =

American businessman and rancher

- Born: October 22, 1849; Martinsburg, New York, U.S.
- Died: April 8, 1931 (aged 81); Chicago, Illinois, U.S.
- Burial place: Graceland Cemetery, Chicago
- Occupations: Businessman, rancher
- Spouses: Elva Glidden; Ruth Russel Gentry
- Children: 2 daughters
- Parent(s): James Bush; Caroline Lucretia Hills
- Relatives: Joseph Glidden (father-in-law); Carol Sobieski (granddaughter)

William Henry Bush (October 22, 1849 – April 9, 1931) was an American businessman and rancher. Born in Martinsburg, New York, he sold barbed wire and hats in the Western United States. He became a rancher in Texas and a multi-millionaire due to helium deposits on his landholdings.

== Early life ==
William Henry Bush was born on October 22, 1849, in Martinsburg, New York. His father was James Bush and his mother, Caroline Lucretia Hills.

== Career ==
Bush was hired by Joseph Glidden, the inventor of barbed wire, to find ranching lands in Texas and promote the new invention. With Henry B. Sanborn, he established the Frying Pan Ranch in Potter County.

With his brother-in-law, F. T. Simmons, Bush co-founded the Bush, Simmons, and Company, a hat company, in 1885. By 1903, Bush founded the Bush Hat Company and served as its president.

Bush was the founder of the city of Bushland, Texas, in 1903, which was named in his honor. It was founded as a railway stop on the Chicago, Rock Island and Pacific Railroad.

Much of the land which Bush possessed was replete with helium deposits. As a result, Bush became a multimillionaire. He was worth US$2,175,000 by 1931.

== Personal life ==
Bush married Elva Glidden, Joseph Glidden's daughter, in 1877. On October 20, 1908, he married Ruth Russel Gentry. They had two daughters, Caroline Gentry Bush, who married Frederick Latham Emeny, and Ruth Emmeline Bush, who married Francis Thomas O'Brien. Bush attended the Fourth Presbyterian Church in Chicago.

== Death and legacy ==
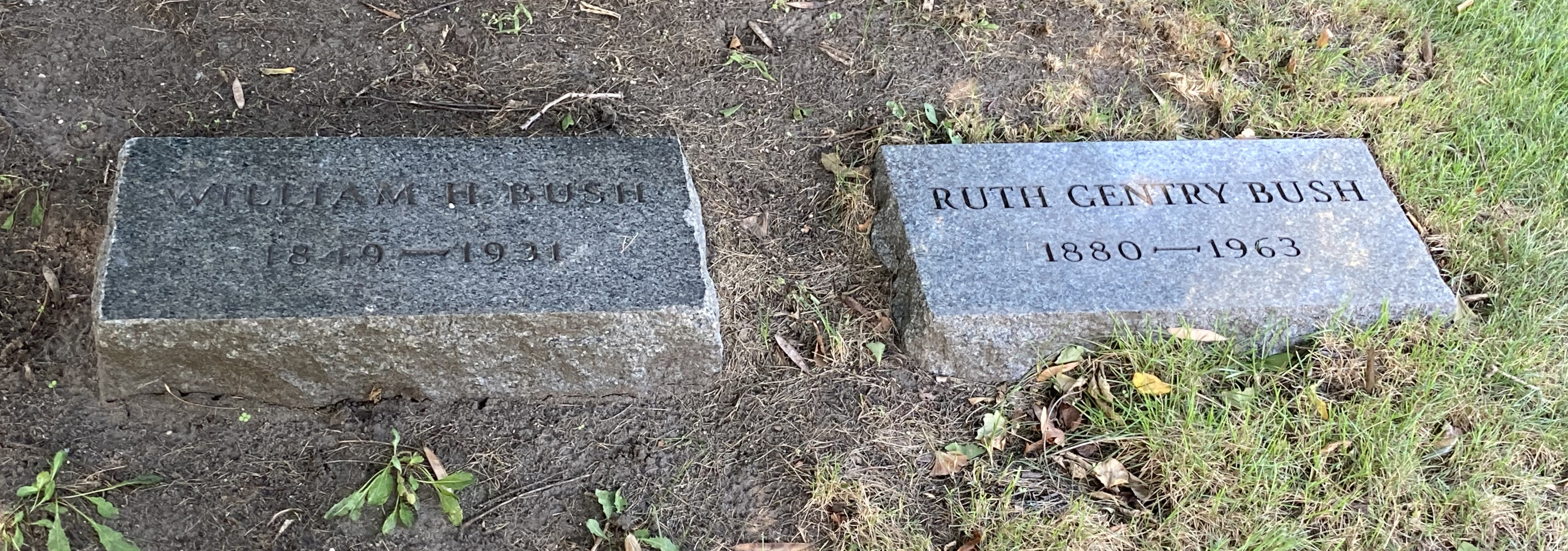
Graves of William Henry and Ruth Gentry Bush at Graceland Cemetery

Bush died on April 9, 1931, in Chicago, and was buried at Graceland Cemetery. Two thirds of his estate went to his widow and two daughters. His cousin, Herbert S. Bush of DeKalb, Illinois, also received some inheritance. Furthermore, he donated US$100,000 to the Presbyterian Hospital of Chicago and US$25,000 to the Chicago Art Institute.

== Secondary source ==
- Paul Howard Carlson. Empire builder in the Texas Panhandle : William Henry Bush. College Station, Texas: Texas A & M University Press. 2009. 186 pages.
