= Trent Sisemore =

American politician

31st Mayor of Amarillo
- In office 2001–2005
- Preceded by: Kel Seliger
- Succeeded by: Debra McCartt

City Commissioner of Amarillo, Texas
- In office 1995–2001
- Preceded by: John McKissack
- Succeeded by: Debra McCartt

Personal details
- Born: September 5, 1961 (age 65) Amarillo, Texas, U.S.
- Party: Republican
- Spouse: Sharla Sisemore
- Children: 2
- Education: West Texas A&M University; University of Texas at Austin
- Occupation: Businessman; pilot; worship pastor

Trent Sisemore (born September 5, 1961) is the former Mayor of Amarillo, Texas. He served as Mayor for two terms from 2001 to 2005 and as Amarillo City Commissioner for three terms from 1995 to 2001. Sisemore was preceded as Mayor by Texas Senator Kel Seliger and succeeded by Debra McCartt. He is a former Co-owner of Jack Sisemore Traveland. Sisemore is one of the original founders of Keystone RV, one of the world's largest travel trailer and fifth wheel manufacturers.

Sisemore graduated from Amarillo High School, West Texas A&M University and The University of Texas at Austin. Trent is a member of Phi Kappa Phi Honor society at UT Austin. He has served on the Happy State Bank Board since 2005 and was the choir/orchestra director and worship pastor for The Church at Quail Creek from 1988 to 2014.

Sisemore currently serves on the Amarillo Area Foundation Board and has previously served on the Amarillo Chamber of Commerce Board, The United Way Board, The Amarillo Community Prayer Breakfast Committee, CareNet Crisis Pregnancy Board, American Heart Association Board and was past President of the Amarillo Executive Association and past President of the Amarillo Speech and Hearing Center Board.

Sisemore has an Airline Transport Pilots license and is rated and flies many different kinds of jets and multi-engine airplanes. He is a third degree Black Belt and a sixth generation Texan, Son of the Republic of Texas.

He and his wife have two daughters.
