= Carol Sobieski =

American screenwriter (1939–1990)

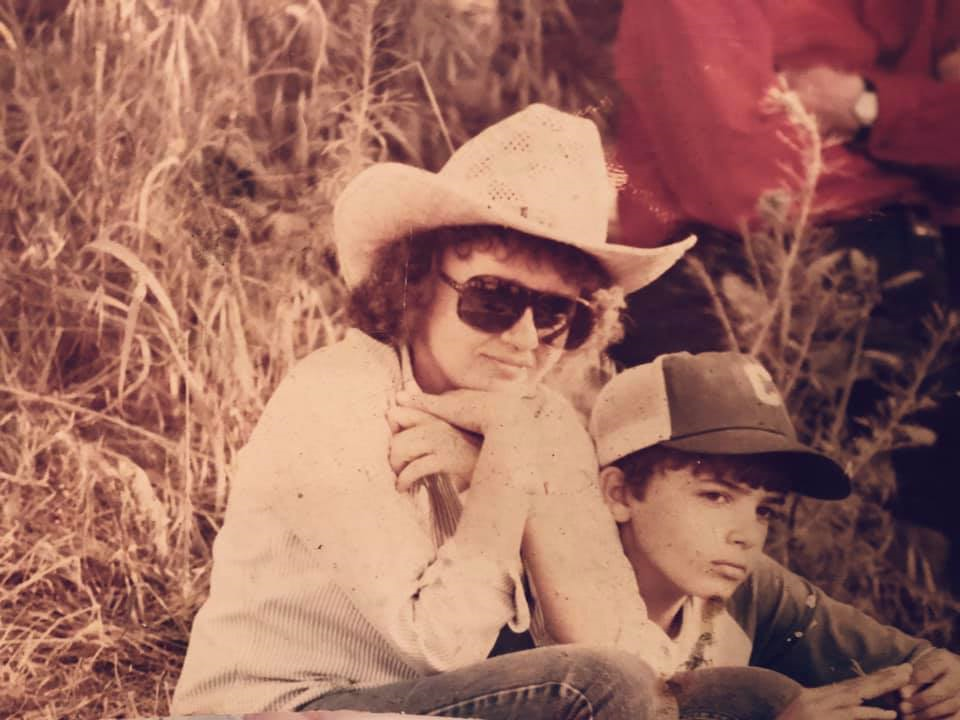
- Sobieski with her son James
- Born: Carol O'Brien; March 16, 1939; Chicago, Illinois, United States
- Died: November 4, 1990 (aged 51); Santa Monica, California, United States
- Burial place: Amarillo, Texas
- Occupation: Writer
- Years active: 1964–1990
- Spouse: James Louis Sobieski (m. 1964)
- Children: 3
- Relatives: William Henry Bush (grandfather); James R. Webb (uncle)
- Awards: Humanitas Prize; 1978 Family

Carol Sobieski (née O'Brien; March 16, 1939 – November 4, 1990) was an American screenwriter whose work included the scripts for Annie (1982) and Fried Green Tomatoes (1991).

== Early life ==
Sobieski was born Carol O'Brien in Chicago, Illinois, in 1939. Her father Frank Thomas O'Brien was a lawyer and her mother Ruth Emeline (née Bush) O'Brien a politician and teacher. Five years later, the family moved to the Texas Panhandle and took over operation of the Bush family's Frying Pan Ranch, near Amarillo, Texas. Sobieski attended Smith College and received her Master's degree in Literature from Trinity College, Dublin. She married lawyer James Louis Sobieski in 1964, and they had three children.

== Film career ==
In 1978, Sobieski won the Humanitas Prize for the television series Family. She was nominated for two Emmy Awards, for Harry S. Truman: Plain Speaking in 1977, and Sarah, Plain and Tall in 1991.

Sobieski and author Fannie Flagg were awarded the 1991 USC Scripter Award for their screenplay for Fried Green Tomatoes, the film adaptation of Flagg's novel, Fried Green Tomatoes at the Whistle Stop Cafe. They were also nominated for an Academy Award for Best Adapted Screenplay.

== Filmography ==
- 1973: Sunshine
- 1976: Family
- 1976: Harry S. Truman: Plain Speaking
- 1976: Amelia Earhart - television miniseries
- 1978: Casey's Shadow
- 1980: Honeysuckle Rose
- 1980: The Women's Room
- 1982: Annie
- 1982: The Toy
- 1985: Sylvester
- 1988: The Bourne Identity - television movie
- 1989: Winter People
- 1991: Sarah, Plain and Tall
- 1991: Fried Green Tomatoes
- 1993: Money for Nothing

== Death ==
Sobieski died on November 4, 1990, in Santa Monica, California, at age 51. Her cause of death was from the blood plasma liver disease known as amyloidosis.
