= Paul Harpole =

American politician and businessman (born 1950)

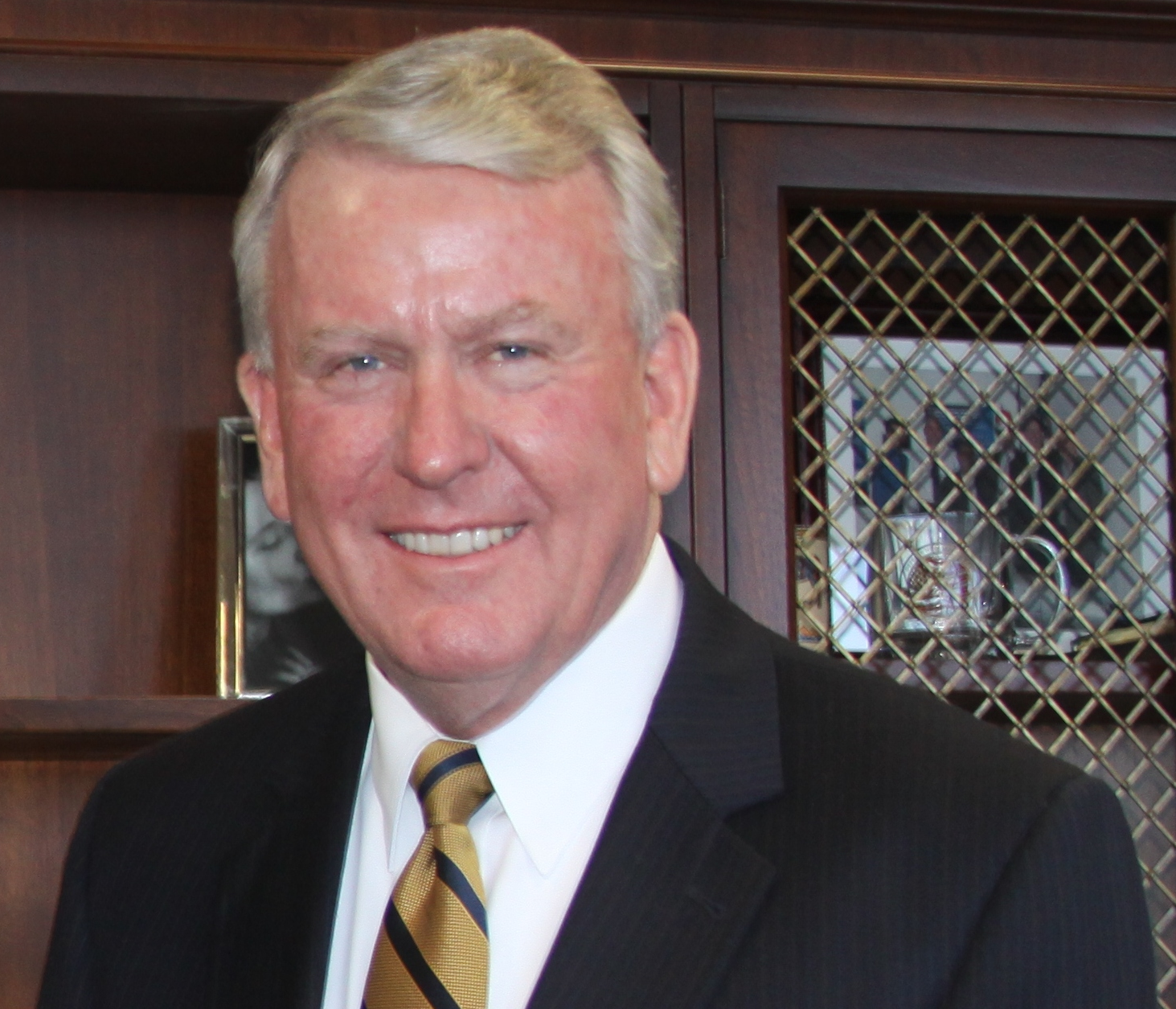

33rd Mayor of Amarillo
- In office May 2011 – May 2017
- Preceded by: Debra McCartt
- Succeeded by: Ginger Nelson

Member of the Amarillo City Council for Place 2
- In office May 2005 – May 2007
- Preceded by: Terri Stavenhagen
- Succeeded by: Brian J. Eades

Personal details
- Born: 1950 (age 75–76) Deer Lodge, Montana, U.S.
- Spouse: Jenny Zimmermann
- Children: 2
- Education: University of New Mexico (BBA)
- Profession: Automobile salesperson; politician

Military service
- Branch/service: United States Army
- Years of service: 1968-1971
- Battles/wars: Vietnam War
- Awards: Army Commendation Medal, Army Air Medal

Paul Harpole (born 1950) is an American politician and businessman who served as the mayor of Amarillo, Texas, the largest city in the Texas Panhandle, from May 2011 to May 2017. He chose not to seek re-election in 2017. Before serving as mayor, Harpole was an Amarillo City Councilmember from May 2005 to May 2007.

Throughout his political career, Harpole has focused on improving downtown Amarillo. He is the vice-chairman of the downtown Center City Amarillo Tax Increment Reinvestment Zone board, which diverts property tax revenues in the zone to projects with the goal of improving the area. As mayor, he has explored plans to build a baseball stadium and a parking garage in Amarillo. However, the development partners that the city worked with for three years suddenly went out of business in January 2015, causing a setback.

Harpole has also received media attention for his comments on refugees in Amarillo, which receives more refugees per capita than any other Texas city. He has expressed concern for the city's ability to accommodate the relatively large number, but has asserted that Amarillo is supportive and accepting of refugees.

== Personal life ==
Harpole was born in Deer Lodge, Montana in 1950, and raised in Denver, Colorado. After finishing high school, he joined the U.S. Army in 1968. From 1969 to 1971, he served two tours of duty in the Vietnam War as a crew chief on a medevac helicopter. During his time in Vietnam, he received an Army Commendation Medal and nineteen Army Air Medals. After finishing his service, he enrolled in the University of New Mexico in 1971, where he was involved with Kappa Alpha Order. He graduated with a Bachelor of Business Administration degree from the Anderson School of Management in 1976.

Shortly after graduating, Harpole began selling cars at Frontier Ford in Albuquerque, New Mexico. In 1982, he moved to Amarillo, where he secured a position as vice president and general manager of John Chandler Ford. In 2009, he left John Chandler Ford and started his own auto dealership. Currently, Harpole is President of Paul Harpole Motors.

Harpole and his wife Jenny have two children, Daniel and Amy. They have six grandchildren.

== Early political career ==
Harpole was first elected to the Amarillo City Council as the Councilmember for Place 2, one of four City Council positions elected at-large by a majority of voters, in May 2005. He served a single two-year term. During his term, in 2006, the city's Tax Increment Reinvestment Zone for downtown Amarillo was created. When it was created, Harpole became the TIRZ board's vice-chairman, a role he maintains today.

== Mayor of Amarillo ==
=== First term ===
On January 11, 2011, Harpole announced that he intended to run for Mayor of Amarillo. He campaigned on a plan to revitalize the downtown area to increase sales tax revenues, to establish Tax Increment Reinvestment Zones in other parts of the city, and to tackle graffiti. Out of a field of 11 candidates, he won the election held on May 14, 2011, with 77 percent of the vote. His closest opponent, Roy D. McDowell, came in second with 13 percent of the vote.

To keep his campaign promise to fight graffiti, Harpole created a graffiti task force a few months after taking office. The city appropriated $150,000 for the group's first year, and Amarillo National Bank donated an additional $50,000. On April 24, 2012, the Amarillo City Council unanimously approved an anti-graffiti ordinance that prohibited the position of spray cans by minors under 17, and gave the city the power to fine property owners who did not clean up graffiti. Commenting on the issue, Mayor Harpole said, "It's not a joke. You're a criminal".

Focusing on a downtown revitalization, Harpole explored plans to build a baseball stadium in Amarillo. A November Convention Sports & Leisure study estimated the cost to be between $20 million and $30 million, but predicted a potential $88 billion increase in economic activity as a result.

Harpole also toured Sugar Land, a city in the Houston metro area, along with other Amarillo city officials. Sugar Land city officials cited low crime, a major hotel, and low property tax rates as key to their city's redevelopment. In Sugar Land, Harpole met with former Sugar Land mayor David Wallace, and his business partner, Costa Bajjali, both principals of Wallace Bajjali Development Partners. In November 2011, the city approved a $947,000 payment to Wallace Bajjali and began talks on how to revitalize downtown Amarillo. 51 investors sued the group for losses of $3.1 million in an alleged ponzi scheme. In February 2012, the group agreed to settle the suit for about $1.2 million. The city continued doing business with the group.

In September 2012, a city ordinance that banned texting and driving passed 15 months after Governor Rick Perry vetoed a similar state law. Harpole supported it, saying, "Today, none of us would think of getting into a car without airbags or seatbelts. To me, it's that kind of issue".

=== Second term ===
Mayor Harpole ran for a second term in the mayoral election held on May 10, 2013. He faced just one challenger, Terry Baughman, a lifelong Amarillo resident who worked as an assistant manager at Walgreens. Harpole campaigned on plans to build a major hotel, a parking garage, and a baseball stadium. Harpole claimed, "We'll see an increase. Not just in the property values, but an increase in use. More families, there's other things planned, parks". Baughman promised to improve areas of Amarillo outside of downtown, and criticized Harpole for not having a stronger water conservation plan. Harpole was re-elected with 83% of the vote.

On February 21, 2014, Mayor Harpole spoke about the refugee population in Amarillo. According to 2007-2012 State Department data from U.S. Representative Mac Thornberry, Amarillo received the highest number of refugees per capita than any other Texas city. According to Harpole, the city has struggled with accommodating a high number of foreign language speakers in areas like education and 911 response. Harpole told the Texas Tribune, "We've raised some red flags and said this isn't good for some entities in the city or for the refugees themselves". Many refugees worked in meatpacking plants in the area, but Harpole expressed concern that jobs were declining and believed "it's going to be more difficult for the refugees to do well" in Amarillo. After requests from Harpole, the Texas Health and Human Services Commission agreed with various refugee resettlement organizations in late 2013 that new placements in Amarillo would be limited to family reunification. However, Harpole wished to make clear, "We don't want to get the idea out that we are not supportive of refugees. We've been very accepting. But we also need to keep it in a ratio that's healthy for the refugees as well as the residents".

In November 2014, the city approved a $14.3 million parking garage, to be built by Wallace Bajjali Development Partners, the group that Harpole met in Sugar Land. The city also continued talks with the firm about a future baseball stadium. Harpole said, in August 2014, "This is one of the best public-private partnerships that could be imagined". However, in January 2015, the development group shut down without warning. The city had already spent $924,312.35 for work done during the planning stages. Amarillo declared the company in default of its contracts, and sued to recover $177,500 that had been set aside but not paid yet. In February 2016, the city decided to abandon the lawsuit and received $20,000 in attorney's fees, about 70% of the actual cost.

In February 2015, Harpole sat down with NewsChannel 10 to show hundreds of pages of documents that the city reviewed to vet Wallace Bajjali prior to doing business with the group in 2011. Harpole defended the city's decision at the time, saying, "They looked at everything they could to say are these people reasonable, can they perform and [...] have they been honest in their past dealings. Every one of these (documents) says to move ahead".

=== Third term ===
On January 21, 2015, Harpole announced that he would run for a third term in the upcoming mayoral election. In his announcement, priorities that he cited included highway beautification, creating an additional Tax Increment Reinvestment Zone, and adding to the city's water rights. He was opposed by Roy McDowell, who criticized Harpole's plan to build a ballpark, saying "We didn't get to vote on it, but I am going to make sure from here on out that people get to vote on all major issues". He also mentioned red light cameras, hand-held cell phones, animal control, and the drainage tax as additional issues he wished to put to a vote. Harpole won the May 9 election with 7568 votes, or 54%.

In January 2016, Harpole was interviewed by conservative news site Watchdog.org about refugees in Amarillo. In the article, Harpole is quoted talking about "small ghettos" being created and "rival tribes" being settled together. Despite Harpole's assertion that he was misquoted, multiple conservative sites, including Breitbart News, picked up the story. Harpole insisted, "I have no concern about refugees and ones that have been here. I have always felt that they've been a big part and a good part of our community". Later, on April 21, 2016, Harpole testified in front of the Texas Senate on the issue, complaining that Amarillo has not "been involved in the consultation meetings [on refugee placement] at all".

In Harpole's third term, councilmembers expressed the need to improve relationships between each other. On June 6, 2016, Harpole expressed concern about controversial Facebook posts, which contained ethnic and sexual slurs, by Sandra McCartt. She was a candidate to fill Harpole's former seat on the city council after his successor, Brian Eades, announced his resignation. The next day, Harpole walked out of a City Council executive session, accusing a councilmember of leaking the rankings of candidates to fill the position. He also alleged that councilmembers chastised him for changing the process for selecting Eades' replacement when he suggested bypassing the scheduled questioning of McCartt by the council, and ending her candidacy. Councilman Randy Burkett then admonished Harpole for publicly criticizing McCartt. Councilman Elisha Demerson said Harpole "owes it to the citizens of this community to be present", while Councilman Mark Nair criticized the mayor for not letting the selection process play out. Harpole defended himself, saying, "I am not going to be ruled by the process. I am ruled by my constituents". In November 2016, Interim City Manager Terry Childers called the city's politics "toxic" and "frustrating". These remarks followed his resignation after being caught denigrating a citizen speaker on a hot mic that month, and berating 911 dispatchers in February.

In August 2016, Harpole asked the city council to consider starting a day labor program for Amarillo's homeless, modeled after Albuquerque's "There's a Better Way" program. That program employed the homeless in various beautification projects, like picking up trash and pulling weeds. In October 2016, the city approved $50,000 to fund a pilot program.

The next mayoral election was held on May 6, 2017. Harpole did not seek a fourth term, and was succeeded by Ginger Nelson.
