= Lee Bivins =

American rancher, oilman and politician (1862–1929)

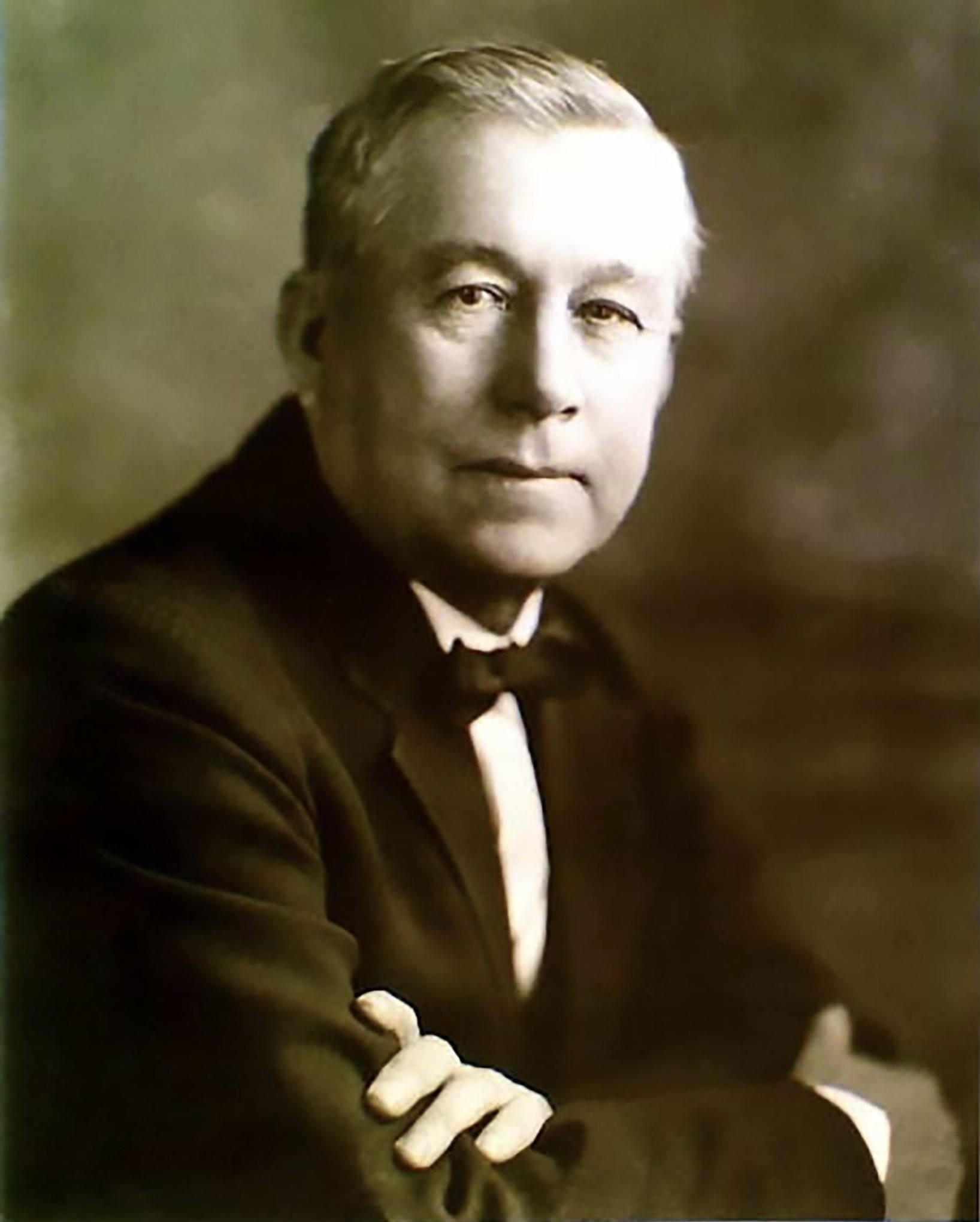

11th Mayor of Amarillo
- In office April 1925 – January 17, 1929
- Preceded by: E. S. Blasdel
- Succeeded by: Ernest O. Thompson

Personal details
- Born: October 7, 1862 Farmington, Texas, U.S.
- Died: January 17, 1929 (aged 66) Wichita Falls, Texas, U.S.
- Spouse: Mary Elizabeth Gilbert (m. 1882)
- Children: 4
- Relatives: Teel Bivins (great-grandson)

Lee Bivins (October 12, 1862 – January 17, 1929) was an American rancher, oilman and politician. At the time of his death, he was purported to be the largest individual cattle owner in the world, and his fortune was estimated to be $20 million (equivalent to $287 million in 2024). Bivins was brought to the petroleum industry in his later years with the discovery of large amounts of gas and oil on much of his property.

Bivins was born in a small Grayson County settlement, the son of a rancher, merchant, and mill operator. By age 20, he had amassed a sizable herd of dogies and had established two general stores. Bivins interest in cattle led him to the Texas panhandle in the early 1880s, where he was elected county commissioner. A much-publicized feud in the 1890s involving a local father and son lead to the death of Bivins’ brother, which prompted him to attack his brother's killer. Although Bivins was charged with attempted murder, he was acquitted the following year.

The early 1900s saw numerous purchases of large ranch properties in the panhandle made by Bivins, which eventually made up his approximately 500,000 acres of property. It was said that he cornered the Texas steer beef market by 1918. A 1918 discovery of natural gas on his Potter County land proved to be part of the largest field in the world. Bivins died on January 17, 1929, while serving his second term as the 11th mayor of Amarillo.

== Early life ==
Lee Bivins was born on October 7, 1862, in Farmington, Texas, the son of Oliver Cromwell Bivins (1835–1907) and Elizabeth Jane Bivins (née Miller; 1842–1925). He had two younger sisters: Elizabeth Alice and Cora Bell; and three younger brothers: Emory Hood, Richard Henry, and Albert William. His father, a native of Indiana who moved to Texas in 1849, ranched, ran a mercantile store, and operated the county's first mill. His mother was a native of Tennessee. Bivins received his education in Grayson County public schools. He entered his career as a cattleman at age 16 on his father's ranch. On August 18, 1882, Bivins married Mary Elizabeth Gilbert.

== Career ==
By 1889, Bivins had established a makeshift shack in Claude, Texas, where he lived alone; his family joined him after he expanded business. He opened a grocery store, a wheat mill, an elevator, and purchased from the Ja Ranch (Later the Mulberry Ranch) seven miles south of town. In 1890, he was elected county commissioner from his precinct.

In the 1890s, a much-publicized local feud occurred between Bivins, saloons-keeper "Skid" Ellis, and Ellis' son Ed Ellis, when Ed had embezzled money entrusted to him by Bivins. The situation only worsened when Bivins’ brother Richard began courting Skid's niece, prompting him to shoot and kill Dick. Bivins attempted to settle the feud when he found himself on the same train as Ellis, although he managed only to wound him. Bivins, who was initially charged with attempted murder, was acquitted the next year. Ellis was tried for the murder of Richard Bivins, but was acquitted, eventually leaving the panhandle.

Bivins opened a livery stable in Amarillo in 1900. During his first years of business in Amarillo, he leased several hundred acres of land for his growing herd. His first big purchase was the Cross Bar Ranch, located on the south bank of the Canadian River. A dispute began when it became apparent both Bivins and rancher R. Ben Masterson both wished to purchase more than 100,000 acres of grassland from the British owners of the LX Ranch. According to a family story, Bivins and Masterson agreed on a coin toss which would give the winner a choice of purchasing land from the north or south side of the Canadian River. Masterson won the toss, choosing the north side. Bivins' purchase of land included the LX Ranch headquarters, built by Henry C. Harding in 1902. Before long, he had purchased the right to use the LX Brand which, along with the purchase of land, totaled $79,000.

In 1915, the Bivins Building, built on the site of the old opera house, which Bivins had owned stock in, was destroyed by a fire. on May 19 of that year, he purchased the 53,329 acres from the American Pastoral Company for about $203,000. Another 50,000 acres of LIT land was added to his holdings with Berkeley Dawson in 1918. He purchased the Coldwater Ranch, which made up part of XIT properties, and extensive holdings near Fort Sumner, New Mexico. It is believed he cornered the Texas steer beef market in 1918–1919, and had been the largest individual owner of cattle by the 1920s. He contributed to the establishment of Amarillo's first airport, the Panhandle Aerial Service and Transportation Company, and served as its first president.

Bivins served eight years as an Amarillo City Commissioner before being elected as the 11th mayor of Amarillo in April 1925. He was re-elected in 1927. In January 1927, he became ill from indigestion en route home from a visit with his sister from Sherman, Texas. Bivins died as a result of a heart attack on the night of January 17, 1929 during a stay in a Wichita Falls hospital.
