= Henry B. Sanborn =

American businessman (1845–1912)

- Born: Henry Bradley Sanborn; September 10, 1845; St. Lawrence County, New York, U.S.
- Died: May 19, 1912 (aged 66); Battle Creek, Michigan, U.S.
- Resting place: Forest Hills Cemetery
- Occupations: Businessman, rancher, hotelier, horse breeder, philanthropist
- Spouse: Ellen M. Wheeler
- Children: 1 son
- Parent(s): Edmund Sanborn; Harriet White

Henry B. Sanborn (September 10, 1845 – May 19, 1912) was an American businessman, rancher, hotelier, horse breeder and philanthropist. He was known as the "Father of Amarillo, Texas."

== Early life ==
Henry Bradley Sanborn was born on September 10, 1845, in St. Lawrence County, New York. His father was Edmund Sanborn and his mother, Harriet White.

== Career ==
Sanborn started his career by working for Joseph Glidden's Barb Fence Company in DeKalb, Illinois, in 1864. By 1872, he began purchasing horses on the East Coast to sell them in Denver, Colorado, with his colleague, Judson P. Warner. By 1875, they were hired by Glidden and Isaac L. Ellwood to sell barbed wire in the West for his Barb Fence Company, later renamed the Washburn and Moen Manufacturing Company. They established their headquarters in Houston, and sold barbed wire in Sherman, Dallas, Austin, and San Antonio. By 1876, they made a profit of US$1 million.

Sanborn took up ranching to promote the use of barbed wire. He purchased a 2,000-acre ranch west of Sherman in Grayson County in 1876. Over the years, this ranch grew to be 10,300 acres. By 1881, working for Glidden alongside William Henry Bush, Sanborn established the Frying Pan Ranch near Bushland, Texas, spanning acres of land in Potter County and Randall County. Furthermore, Sanborn acquired 17,000 acres in Clay County, followed by 40,000 acres in Hall County. Additionally, Sanborn acquired the Bravo Ranch, spanning 120,000 acres in Hartley County.

Besides promoting barbed wire, Sanborn also used his ranches to breed horses. He bred Percheron and French Coach Horses. He crossed Thoroughbreds and Spanish Mustangs to produce ranch horses. Additionally, he organized an annual horse show in Dallas.

Sanborn was the founder of Amarillo, Texas, which lay on his Frying Pan Ranch. When the Fort Worth and Denver Railway built a stop in the town, he established the Panhandle Loan Association and built the Amarillo Hotel for US$50,000. Three years later, he acquired the Hutchins House and redeveloped it into a hotel in 1892. Subsequently, Sanborn became known as the "Father of Amarillo."

== Philanthropy ==
Sanborn donated acres of land to the city of Amarillo for the establishment of Ellwood Park, in honor of his son. He also donated land for the establishment of St. Anthony's Hospital.

== Personal life ==
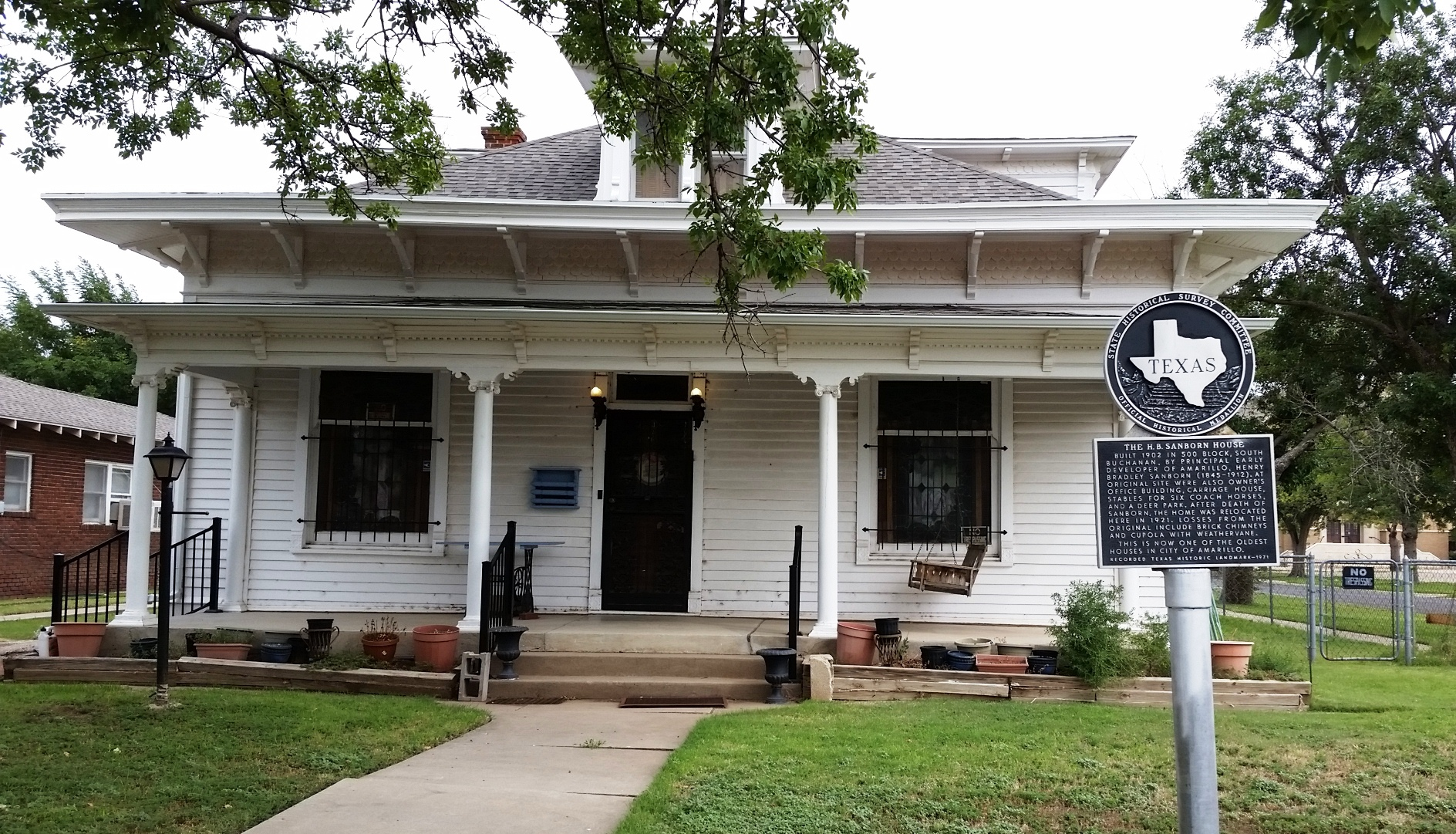
The Henry B. and Ellen M. Sanborn House in Amarillo, Texas.

Sanborn married Ellen M. Wheeler, the niece of Joseph F. Glidden, on February 20, 1868. They had a son, Ellwood, who died at the age of twenty-one. The Sanborns lived in a Kansas City, Missouri, mansion from 1892 to 1902, when they moved to Amarillo and built a large estate near the modern-day Amarillo Civic Center.

== Death and legacy ==
Sanborn died on May 19, 1912, in Battle Creek, Michigan. He was buried at the Forest Hills Cemetery in Kansas City, Missouri. His widow donated land to the city of Amarillo for the establishment of Sanborn Park in 1916. Six years later, the Sanborn Elementary School, also in Amarillo, was named in his honor. Meanwhile, his widow sold the Bravo Ranch to Cornelius T. Herring and Patrick H. Landergin. Additionally, their house was later moved to 1311 Madison Street. It has been listed on the National Register of Historic Places since August 14, 1992.
