= Tax Increment Reinvestment Zone =

A tax increment reinvestment zone (TIRZ) is a political subdivision of a municipality or county in the state of Texas created to implement tax increment financing. They may be initiated by the city or county or by petition of owners whose total holdings in the zone consist of a majority of the appraised property value.

== Background ==
With federal and state sources for redevelopment generally less available, local governments have been forced to find other ways to subsidize improvement projects in their localities, without directly raising taxes. One of the tools many states use to take up the slack by lack of federal and state funding is Tax Increment Financing (TIF), which is a public financing method used for redevelopment and community improvement projects for more than 50 years. Texas utilizes TIF by creating tax increment reinvestment zones (TIRZs) which may be initiated by the city or county or by petition of owners whose total holdings in the zone consist of a majority of the appraised property value.

== Creation ==
There are 3 steps involved in the creation of a TIRZ:

1. Property owners possessing 50% or more of the appraised value of a district submit a petition to the county, city, or town requesting a TIRZ be set up, or the local government may decide to create one. A specific lifetime for the TIRZ is determined. A TIRZ may only be city-initiated if less than 10% of its land area consists of residential area.
2. For the purposes of existing tax-collecting entities (water districts, counties, etc.) the assessed values of properties within the new TIRZ are frozen. It is assumed that property values will increase over the lifetime of the TIRZ; the property taxes collected on this increase constitute the "increment".
3. Local taxing authorities besides the creating organization negotiate for how much of the tax increment they will donate to the fund instead of keeping for themselves.
4. The municipality or county passes an ordinance establishing a governing board for the TIRZ and the zone as a legal entity itself. The board then meets to create a budget for the lifetime of the zone, establishing what projects it will undertake and how they will be financed. This plan is passed as another ordinance.

== Legal influences ==
A TIRZ may not simply be created without justification. In its current state, the area must have a deleterious effect on the economic future of the creating body.

[The area must] substantially arrest or impair the sound growth of the municipality or county creating the zone, retard the provision of housing accommodations, or constitute an economic or social liability and be a menace to the public health, safety, morals, or welfare in its present condition and use...

However, this does not restrict the use of TIRZs to poor areas. Among the conditions justifying creation of a TIRZ is "the predominance of defective or inadequate sidewalk or street layout," and wealthy areas may be included in a TIRZ; for example, Uptown Houston is a TIRZ.

A county may not create a TIRZ for economic development (for example, infrastructure improvements around a new stadium), but a city may create a TIRZ for this purpose and turn the increment over to the county.
