= ESBRI =

Swedish research institute

ESBRI - Entrepreneurship and Small Business Research Institute - is a Swedish autonomous institution which disseminates research-based knowledge on entrepreneurship, innovation and small business. ESBRI was founded in 1996 through a donation by Leif Lundblad, a Swedish inventor and entrepreneur. The overall aim of ESBRI is to stimulate entrepreneurship in Sweden.

ESBRI is independent of economic, political and religious interests. Through the years ESBRI has been financed by both private and public funds.

ESBRI arranges the open lecture series Estrad in Stockholm (ten times per year), publishes the magazine Entré (four times per year), and the newsletter e-Entré (ten times per year). ESBRI also organizes a series of other seminars, workshops and conferences. One of the major annual conferences is The Sweden-U.S. Entrepreneurial Forum, which is organized jointly with the Swedish Ministry of Enterprise and Innovation and U.S. Department of Commerce. ESBRI - in collaboration with the Swedish governmental agency Vinnova - also organizes a PhD course in research commercialization: From Research to Business (R2B). ESBRI is the Swedish host for Global Entrepreneurship Week (GEW).

The purpose of all of ESBRI's activities is to provide entrepreneurs, politicians, students, researchers, policy makers, venture capitalists - and everyone else interested in entrepreneurship matters - with new research discoveries in popularized form.

Magnus Aronsson is the Managing Director of ESBRI.
