= Texas's 31st Senate district =

American legislative district

Texas's 31st State Senate district
Senator
Kevin Sparks; R–Midland
- Demographics: 48.8% White; 6.1% Black; 42.7% Hispanic; 2.4% Asian
- Population: 861,211

District 31 of the Texas Senate is a senatorial district that currently serves Andrews, Armstrong, Bailey, Borden, Briscoe, Carson, Castro, Cochran, Coke, Crane, Dallam, Dawson, Deaf Smith, Ector, Gaines, Glasscock, Hall, Hansford, Hartley, Hemphill, Howard, Hutchinson, Irion, Lipscomb, Loving, Martin, Midland, Mitchell, Moore, Ochiltree, Oldham, Parmer, Potter, Randall, Reagan, Roberts, Schleicher, Scurry, Sherman, Sterling, Swisher, Upton, Ward, Winkler, Yoakum counties in the U.S. state of Texas.

The current senator from District 31 is Kevin Sparks.

== Biggest cities in the district ==
District 31 has a population of 793,600 with 573,847 that is at voting age from the 2010 census.

	Name	County	Pop. (Note: Population is based on the number of people in the district in that city, not the overall population of that city)
1	Amarillo	Potter/Randall	190,695
2	Midland	Martin/Midland	111,147
3	Odessa	Ector/Midland	99,940
4	Big Spring	Howard	27,282
5	Pampa	Gray	17,994

== Election history ==
Election history of District 31 from 1992. (Note: Uncontested primary elections are not shown.)

=== 2022 ===
Kevin Sparks (Republican) was unopposed; as such, the election was cancelled and Sparks was declared elected without a vote.

Texas's 31st State Senate District Republican primary, 2022
Party	Candidate	Votes	%
Republican	Kevin Sparks	45,867	54.88
Republican	Tim Reid	19,039	22.78
Republican	Stormy Bradley	13,573	16.24
Republican	Jesse Quackenbush	5,101	6.1
Total votes		83,580	100.0

=== 2018 ===
Texas general election, 2018: Senate District 31
Party	Candidate	Votes	%	±%
Republican	Kel Seliger (Incumbent)	174,367	87.52	−2.91
Libertarian	Jack Westbrook	24,869	12.48	+2.91
Majority		96,469	75.04	−5.82
Turnout		199,236		
Republican hold				

=== 2014 ===
Texas general election, 2014: Senate District 31
Party	Candidate	Votes	%	±%
Republican	Kel Seliger (Incumbent)	107,885	90.43	−9.57
Libertarian	Steven Gibson	11,416	9.57	+9.57
Majority		96,469	80.86	−19.14
Turnout		119,301		
Republican hold				

=== 2012 ===
Texas general election, 2012: Senate District 31
Party	Candidate	Votes	%	±%
Republican	Kel Seliger (Incumbent)	195,878	100.0	+9.79
Majority		195,878		
Turnout				
Republican hold				

=== 2008 ===
Texas general election, 2008: Senate District 31
Party	Candidate	Votes	%	±%
Republican	Kel Seliger (Incumbent)	180,267	90.21	+11.68
Libertarian	Lauren Poindexter	19,569	9.79	+9.79
Majority		160,698	80.42	+21.47
Turnout		199,836		
Republican hold				

=== 2004 ===
Texas general election, 2004: Senate District 31
Party	Candidate	Votes	%	±%
Republican	Kel Seliger (Incumbent)	170,299	78.53	−21.47
Democratic	Elaine King Miller	46,556	21.47	+21.47
Majority		123,743	57.06	−42.94
Turnout		216,855		+82.33
Republican hold				

=== 2004 (special) ===
Texas Senate District 31 special runoff election - 17 February 2004
Party	Candidate	Votes	%	±%
Republican	Kel Seliger	41,102	56.15	+20.44
Republican	Kirk Edwards	32,094	43.85	+23.29
Majority		9,008	12.31	
Turnout		73,196		
Republican hold				

Texas Senate District 31 special election - 20 January 2004
Party	Candidate	Votes	%
Republican	Kel Seliger	24,793	35.72
Republican	Kirk Edwards	14,273	20.56
Republican	Don Sparks	11,216	16.16
Republican	Bob Barnes	9,478	13.65
Democratic	Elaine King Miller	5,738	8.27
Republican	Lee Gibson	2,429	3.50
Republican	Jesse Quackenbush	1,488	2.14
Turnout		69,415	

=== 2002 ===
Texas general election, 2002: Senate District 31
Party	Candidate	Votes	%	±%
Republican	Teel Bivins (Incumbent)	118,938	100.00	0.00
Majority		118,938	100.00	0.00
Turnout		118,938		+21.16
Republican hold				

=== 1998 ===
Texas general election, 1998: Senate District 31
Party	Candidate	Votes	%	±%
Republican	Teel Bivins (Incumbent)	98,165	100.00	0.00
Majority		98,165	100.00	0.00
Turnout		98,165		−15.34
Republican hold				

=== 1994 ===
Texas general election, 1994: Senate District 31
Party	Candidate	Votes	%	±%
Republican	Teel Bivins (Incumbent)	115,951	100.00	0.00
Majority		115,951	100.00	0.00
Turnout		115,951		−16.76
Republican hold				

=== 1992 ===
Texas general election, 1992: Senate District 31
Party	Candidate	Votes	%	±%
Republican	Teel Bivins (Incumbent)	139,302	100.00	
Majority		139,302	100.00	
Turnout		139,302		
Republican hold				

== District officeholders ==
Legislature	Senator, District 31	Counties in District
5	Isaiah Addison Paschal	Gillespie, Medina, Uvalde.
6	Samuel A. Maverick	Gillespie, Medina, Uvalde.
7	Samuel A. Maverick	Gillespie, Medina, Uvalde.
8	Gustav Schleicher	Gillespie, Medina, Uvalde.
9	Erastus Reed	Atascosa, Bandera, Blanco, Comal, Concho, Dawson (defunct), Frio, Gillespie, Kerr, Kinney, Llano, Mason, Maverick, McCulloch, Medina, Menard, San Saba, Uvalde, Zavala.
10	A. O. Cooley	Atascosa, Bandera, Blanco, Comal, Concho, Dawson (defunct), Edwards, Frio, Gillespie, Kerr, Kimble, Kinney, Llano, Mason, Maverick, McCulloch, Medina, Menard, San Saba, Uvalde, Zavala.
11	A. O. Cooley	Atascosa, Bandera, Blanco, Comal, Concho, Dawson (defunct), Edwards, Frio, Gillespie, Kendall, Kerr, Kimble, Kinney, Llano, Mason, Maverick, McCulloch, Medina, Menard, San Saba, Uvalde, Zavala.
12	District Inactive	
13	District Inactive	
14	District Inactive	
15	Leonidas Jefferson Storey	Blanco, Caldwell, Guadalupe, Hays, Llano, McCulloch, San Saba.
16	Leonidas Jefferson Storey	Blanco, Caldwell, Guadalupe, Hays, Llano, McCulloch, San Saba.
17	William Henry Burges	Blanco, Caldwell, Guadalupe, Hays, Llano, McCulloch, San Saba.
18	William A. Evans	Fannin, Lamar, Red River.
19	William A. Evans	Fannin, Lamar, Red River.
20	Henry D. McDonald	Fannin, Lamar, Red River.
21	Henry D. McDonald	Fannin, Lamar, Red River.
22	James Clark	Fannin, Lamar, Red River.
23	Emory C. Smith	Denton, Montague, Wise.
24	Emory C. Smith	Denton, Montague, Wise.
25	Charles Vernon Terrell	Denton, Montague, Wise.
26	Charles Vernon Terrell	Denton, Montague, Wise.
27	George W. Savage	Denton, Montague, Wise.
28	George W. Savage	Denton, Montague, Wise.
29	Emory C. Smith	Denton, Montague, Wise.
30	Emory C. Smith	Denton, Montague, Wise.
31	John P. Hayter; Charles Vernon Terrell	Denton, Montague, Wise.
32	Charles Vernon Terrell	Denton, Montague, Wise.
33	James R. Wiley	Denton, Montague, Wise.
34	James R. Wiley	Denton, Montague, Wise.
35	George M. Hopkins	Denton, Montague, Wise.
36	George M. Hopkins	Denton, Montague, Wise.
37	Guinn Williams	Denton, Montague, Wise.
38	William H. Rice	Denton, Montague, Wise.
39	J. W. Reid	Armstrong, Briscoe, Carson, Castro, Childress, Collingsworth, Dallam, Deaf Smith, Donley, Gray, Hall, Hansford, Hartley, Hemphill, Hutchinson, Lipscomb, Moore, Ochiltree, Oldham, Parmer, Potter, Randall, Roberts, Sherman, Swisher, Wheeler.
40	J. W. Reid	Armstrong, Briscoe, Carson, Castro, Childress, Collingsworth, Dallam, Deaf Smith, Donley, Gray, Hall, Hansford, Hartley, Hemphill, Hutchinson, Lipscomb, Moore, Ochiltree, Oldham, Parmer, Potter, Randall, Roberts, Sherman, Swisher, Wheeler.
41	Clint C. Small	Armstrong, Briscoe, Carson, Castro, Childress, Collingsworth, Dallam, Deaf Smith, Donley, Gray, Hall, Hansford, Hartley, Hemphill, Hutchinson, Lipscomb, Moore, Ochiltree, Oldham, Parmer, Potter, Randall, Roberts, Sherman, Swisher, Wheeler.
42	Clint C. Small	Armstrong, Briscoe, Carson, Castro, Childress, Collingsworth, Dallam, Deaf Smith, Donley, Gray, Hall, Hansford, Hartley, Hemphill, Hutchinson, Lipscomb, Moore, Ochiltree, Oldham, Parmer, Potter, Randall, Roberts, Sherman, Swisher, Wheeler.
43	Clint C. Small	Armstrong, Briscoe, Carson, Castro, Childress, Collingsworth, Dallam, Deaf Smith, Donley, Gray, Hall, Hansford, Hartley, Hemphill, Hutchinson, Lipscomb, Moore, Ochiltree, Oldham, Parmer, Potter, Randall, Roberts, Sherman, Swisher, Wheeler.
44	Clint C. Small	Armstrong, Briscoe, Carson, Castro, Childress, Collingsworth, Dallam, Deaf Smith, Donley, Gray, Hall, Hansford, Hartley, Hemphill, Hutchinson, Lipscomb, Moore, Ochiltree, Oldham, Parmer, Potter, Randall, Roberts, Sherman, Swisher, Wheeler.
45	Clint C. Small	Armstrong, Briscoe, Carson, Castro, Childress, Collingsworth, Dallam, Deaf Smith, Donley, Gray, Hall, Hansford, Hartley, Hemphill, Hutchinson, Lipscomb, Moore, Ochiltree, Oldham, Parmer, Potter, Randall, Roberts, Sherman, Swisher, Wheeler.
46	Clint C. Small	Armstrong, Briscoe, Carson, Castro, Childress, Collingsworth, Dallam, Deaf Smith, Donley, Gray, Hall, Hansford, Hartley, Hemphill, Hutchinson, Lipscomb, Moore, Ochiltree, Oldham, Parmer, Potter, Randall, Roberts, Sherman, Swisher, Wheeler.
47	Grady Hazlewood	Armstrong, Briscoe, Carson, Castro, Childress, Collingsworth, Dallam, Deaf Smith, Donley, Gray, Hall, Hansford, Hartley, Hemphill, Hutchinson, Lipscomb, Moore, Ochiltree, Oldham, Parmer, Potter, Randall, Roberts, Sherman, Swisher, Wheeler.
48	Grady Hazlewood	Armstrong, Briscoe, Carson, Castro, Childress, Collingsworth, Dallam, Deaf Smith, Donley, Gray, Hall, Hansford, Hartley, Hemphill, Hutchinson, Lipscomb, Moore, Ochiltree, Oldham, Parmer, Potter, Randall, Roberts, Sherman, Swisher, Wheeler.
49	Grady Hazlewood	Armstrong, Briscoe, Carson, Castro, Childress, Collingsworth, Dallam, Deaf Smith, Donley, Gray, Hall, Hansford, Hartley, Hemphill, Hutchinson, Lipscomb, Moore, Ochiltree, Oldham, Parmer, Potter, Randall, Roberts, Sherman, Swisher, Wheeler.
50	Grady Hazlewood	Armstrong, Briscoe, Carson, Castro, Childress, Collingsworth, Dallam, Deaf Smith, Donley, Gray, Hall, Hansford, Hartley, Hemphill, Hutchinson, Lipscomb, Moore, Ochiltree, Oldham, Parmer, Potter, Randall, Roberts, Sherman, Swisher, Wheeler.
51	Grady Hazlewood	Armstrong, Briscoe, Carson, Castro, Childress, Collingsworth, Dallam, Deaf Smith, Donley, Gray, Hall, Hansford, Hartley, Hemphill, Hutchinson, Lipscomb, Moore, Ochiltree, Oldham, Parmer, Potter, Randall, Roberts, Sherman, Swisher, Wheeler.
52	Grady Hazlewood	Armstrong, Briscoe, Carson, Castro, Childress, Collingsworth, Dallam, Deaf Smith, Donley, Gray, Hall, Hansford, Hartley, Hemphill, Hutchinson, Lipscomb, Moore, Ochiltree, Oldham, Parmer, Potter, Randall, Roberts, Sherman, Swisher, Wheeler.
53	Grady Hazlewood	Carson, Dallam, Gray, Hansford, Hartley, Hemphill, Hutchinson, Lipscomb, Moore, Ochiltree, Oldham, Potter, Randall, Roberts, Sherman, Wheeler.
54	Grady Hazlewood	Carson, Dallam, Gray, Hansford, Hartley, Hemphill, Hutchinson, Lipscomb, Moore, Ochiltree, Oldham, Potter, Randall, Roberts, Sherman, Wheeler.
55	Grady Hazlewood	Carson, Dallam, Gray, Hansford, Hartley, Hemphill, Hutchinson, Lipscomb, Moore, Ochiltree, Oldham, Potter, Randall, Roberts, Sherman, Wheeler.
56	Grady Hazlewood	Carson, Dallam, Gray, Hansford, Hartley, Hemphill, Hutchinson, Lipscomb, Moore, Ochiltree, Oldham, Potter, Randall, Roberts, Sherman, Wheeler.
57	Grady Hazlewood	Carson, Dallam, Gray, Hansford, Hartley, Hemphill, Hutchinson, Lipscomb, Moore, Ochiltree, Oldham, Potter, Randall, Roberts, Sherman, Wheeler.
58	Grady Hazlewood	Carson, Dallam, Gray, Hansford, Hartley, Hemphill, Hutchinson, Lipscomb, Moore, Ochiltree, Oldham, Potter, Randall, Roberts, Sherman, Wheeler.
59	Grady Hazlewood	Carson, Dallam, Gray, Hansford, Hartley, Hemphill, Hutchinson, Lipscomb, Moore, Ochiltree, Oldham, Potter, Randall, Roberts, Sherman, Wheeler.
60	Grady Hazlewood	Armstrong, Carson, Collingsworth, Dallam, Deaf Smith, Donley, Gray, Hansford, Hartley, Hemphill, Hutchinson, Lipscomb, Moore, Ochiltree, Oldham, Potter, Randall, Roberts, Sherman, Wheeler.
61	Grady Hazlewood	Armstrong, Carson, Collingsworth, Dallam, Deaf Smith, Donley, Gray, Hansford, Hartley, Hemphill, Hutchinson, Lipscomb, Moore, Ochiltree, Oldham, Potter, Randall, Roberts, Sherman, Wheeler.
62	Max Sherman	Armstrong, Carson, Collingsworth, Dallam, Deaf Smith, Donley, Gray, Hansford, Hartley, Hemphill, Hutchinson, Lipscomb, Moore, Ochiltree, Oldham, Potter, Randall, Roberts, Sherman, Wheeler.
63	Max Sherman	Armstrong, Bailey, Carson, Castro, Collingsworth, Dallam, Deaf Smith, Donley, Gray, Hansford, Hartley, Hemphill, Hockley, Hutchinson, Lamb, Lipscomb, Moore, Ochiltree, Oldham, Parmer, Potter, Randall, Roberts, Sherman, Swisher, Wheeler.
64	Max Sherman	Armstrong, Bailey, Carson, Castro, Collingsworth, Dallam, Deaf Smith, Donley, Gray, Hansford, Hartley, Hemphill, Hockley, Hutchinson, Lamb, Lipscomb, Moore, Ochiltree, Oldham, Parmer, Potter, Randall, Roberts, Sherman, Swisher, Wheeler.
65	Max Sherman; Bob Price	Armstrong, Bailey, Carson, Castro, Collingsworth, Dallam, Deaf Smith, Donley, Gray, Hansford, Hartley, Hemphill, Hockley, Hutchinson, Lamb, Lipscomb, Moore, Ochiltree, Oldham, Parmer, Potter, Randall, Roberts, Sherman, Swisher, Wheeler.
66	Bob Price	Armstrong, Bailey, Carson, Castro, Collingsworth, Dallam, Deaf Smith, Donley, Gray, Hansford, Hartley, Hemphill, Hockley, Hutchinson, Lamb, Lipscomb, Moore, Ochiltree, Oldham, Parmer, Potter, Randall, Roberts, Sherman, Swisher, Wheeler.
67	Bill Sarpalius	Armstrong, Bailey, Carson, Castro, Collingsworth, Dallam, Deaf Smith, Donley, Gray, Hansford, Hartley, Hemphill, Hockley, Hutchinson, Lamb, Lipscomb, Moore, Ochiltree, Oldham, Parmer, Potter, Randall, Roberts, Sherman, Swisher, Wheeler.
68	Bill Sarpalius	Armstrong, Bailey, Briscoe, Carson, Castro, Collingsworth, Dallam, Deaf Smith, Donley, Gray, Hale, Hall, Hansford, Hartley, Hemphill, Hockley, Hutchinson, Lamb, Lipscomb, Moore, Ochiltree, Oldham, Parmer, Potter, Randall, Roberts, Sherman, Swisher, Wheeler.
69	Bill Sarpalius	Armstrong, Bailey, Briscoe, Carson, Castro, Collingsworth, Dallam, Deaf Smith, Donley, Gray, Hale, Hall, Hansford, Hartley, Hemphill, Hockley, Hutchinson, Lamb, Lipscomb, Moore, Ochiltree, Oldham, Parmer, Potter, Randall, Roberts, Sherman, Swisher, Wheeler.
70	Bill Sarpalius	Armstrong, Bailey, Briscoe, Carson, Castro, Collingsworth, Dallam, Deaf Smith, Donley, Gray, Hale, Hall, Hansford, Hartley, Hemphill, Hockley, Hutchinson, Lamb, Lipscomb, Moore, Ochiltree, Oldham, Parmer, Potter, Randall, Roberts, Sherman, Swisher, Wheeler.
71	Teel Bivins	Armstrong, Bailey, Briscoe, Carson, Castro, Collingsworth, Dallam, Deaf Smith, Donley, Gray, Hale, Hall, Hansford, Hartley, Hemphill, Hockley, Hutchinson, Lamb, Lipscomb, Moore, Ochiltree, Oldham, Parmer, Potter, Randall, Roberts, Sherman, Swisher, Wheeler.
72	Teel Bivins	Armstrong, Bailey, Briscoe, Carson, Castro, Collingsworth, Dallam, Deaf Smith, Donley, Gray, Hale, Hall, Hansford, Hartley, Hemphill, Hockley, Hutchinson, Lamb, Lipscomb, Moore, Ochiltree, Oldham, Parmer, Potter, Randall, Roberts, Sherman, Swisher, Wheeler.
73	Teel Bivins	Andrews, Armstrong, Bailey, Carson, Cochran, Dallam, Deaf Smith, Gaines, Gray, Hansford, Hartley, Hemphill, Hutchinson, Lipscomb, Midland, Moore, Ochiltree, Oldham, Parmer, Potter, Randall, Roberts, Sherman, Yoakum.
74	Teel Bivins	All of Andrews, Bailey, Cochran, Dallam, Deaf Smith, Gaines, Gray, Hansford, Hartley, Hemphill, Hutchinson, Lipscomb, Midland, Moore, Ochiltree, Oldham, Parmer, Potter, Randall, Roberts, Sherman, Winkler, Yoakum. Portion of Ector.
75	Teel Bivins	All of Andrews, Bailey, Cochran, Dallam, Deaf Smith, Gaines, Gray, Hansford, Hartley, Hemphill, Hutchinson, Lipscomb, Midland, Moore, Ochiltree, Oldham, Parmer, Potter, Randall, Roberts, Sherman, Winkler, Yoakum. Portion of Ector.
76	Teel Bivins	All of Andrews, Bailey, Cochran, Dallam, Deaf Smith, Gaines, Gray, Hansford, Hartley, Hemphill, Hutchinson, Lipscomb, Midland, Moore, Ochiltree, Oldham, Parmer, Potter, Randall, Roberts, Sherman, Winkler, Yoakum. Portion of Ector.
77	Teel Bivins	All of Andrews, Bailey, Cochran, Dallam, Deaf Smith, Gaines, Gray, Hansford, Hartley, Hemphill, Hutchinson, Lipscomb, Midland, Moore, Ochiltree, Oldham, Parmer, Potter, Randall, Roberts, Sherman, Winkler, Yoakum. Portion of Ector.
78	Teel Bivins; Kel Seliger	Andrews, Bailey, Cochran, Crane, Dallam, Deaf Smith, Ector, Gaines, Glasscock, Hansford, Hartley, Hemphill, Howard, Hutchinson, Lipscomb, Martin, Midland, Moore, Ochiltree, Oldham, Parmer, Potter, Randall, Roberts, Sherman, Yoakum.
79	Kel Seliger	Andrews, Bailey, Cochran, Crane, Dallam, Deaf Smith, Ector, Gaines, Glasscock, Hansford, Hartley, Hemphill, Howard, Hutchinson, Lipscomb, Martin, Midland, Moore, Ochiltree, Oldham, Parmer, Potter, Randall, Roberts, Sherman, Yoakum.
80	Kel Seliger	Andrews, Bailey, Cochran, Crane, Dallam, Deaf Smith, Ector, Gaines, Glasscock, Hansford, Hartley, Hemphill, Howard, Hutchinson, Lipscomb, Martin, Midland, Moore, Ochiltree, Oldham, Parmer, Potter, Randall, Roberts, Sherman, Yoakum.
81	Kel Seliger	Andrews, Bailey, Cochran, Crane, Dallam, Deaf Smith, Ector, Gaines, Glasscock, Hansford, Hartley, Hemphill, Howard, Hutchinson, Lipscomb, Martin, Midland, Moore, Ochiltree, Oldham, Parmer, Potter, Randall, Roberts, Sherman, Yoakum.
82	Kel Seliger	Andrews, Bailey, Cochran, Crane, Dallam, Deaf Smith, Ector, Gaines, Glasscock, Hansford, Hartley, Hemphill, Howard, Hutchinson, Lipscomb, Martin, Midland, Moore, Ochiltree, Oldham, Parmer, Potter, Randall, Roberts, Sherman, Yoakum.
83	Kel Seliger	Andrews, Armstrong, Bailey, Briscoe, Carson, Castro, Cochran, Collingsworth, Dallam, Deaf Smith, Donley, Ector, Gaines, Glasscock, Gray, Hall, Hansford, Hartley, Hemphill, Howard, Hutchinson, Lipscomb, Loving, Martin, Midland, Moore, Ochiltree, Oldham, Parmer, Potter, Randall, Roberts, Sherman, Swisher, Wheeler, Winkler, Yoakum
84	Kel Seliger	Andrews, Armstrong, Bailey, Briscoe, Carson, Castro, Cochran, Collingsworth, Dallam, Deaf Smith, Donley, Ector, Gaines, Glasscock, Gray, Hall, Hansford, Hartley, Hemphill, Howard, Hutchinson, Lipscomb, Loving, Martin, Midland, Moore, Ochiltree, Oldham, Parmer, Potter, Randall, Roberts, Sherman, Swisher, Wheeler, Winkler, Yoakum
85	Kel Seliger	Andrews, Armstrong, Bailey, Briscoe, Carson, Castro, Cochran, Collingsworth, Dallam, Deaf Smith, Donley, Ector, Gaines, Glasscock, Gray, Hall, Hansford, Hartley, Hemphill, Howard, Hutchinson, Lipscomb, Loving, Martin, Midland, Moore, Ochiltree, Oldham, Parmer, Potter, Randall, Roberts, Sherman, Swisher, Wheeler, Winkler, Yoakum
86	Kel Seliger	Andrews, Armstrong, Bailey, Briscoe, Carson, Castro, Cochran, Collingsworth, Dallam, Deaf Smith, Donley, Ector, Gaines, Glasscock, Gray, Hall, Hansford, Hartley, Hemphill, Howard, Hutchinson, Lipscomb, Loving, Martin, Midland, Moore, Ochiltree, Oldham, Parmer, Potter, Randall, Roberts, Sherman, Swisher, Wheeler, Winkler, Yoakum
87	Kel Seliger	Andrews, Armstrong, Bailey, Briscoe, Carson, Castro, Cochran, Collingsworth, Dallam, Deaf Smith, Donley, Ector, Gaines, Glasscock, Gray, Hall, Hansford, Hartley, Hemphill, Howard, Hutchinson, Lipscomb, Loving, Martin, Midland, Moore, Ochiltree, Oldham, Parmer, Potter, Randall, Roberts, Sherman, Swisher, Wheeler, Winkler, Yoakum
88	Kevin Sparks	Andrews, Armstrong, Bailey, Borden, Briscoe, Carson, Castro, Cochran, Coke, Crane, Dallam, Dawson, Deaf Smith, Ector, Gaines, Glasscock, Hall, Hansford, Hartley, Hemphill, Howard, Hutchinson, Irion, Lipscomb, Loving, Martin, Midland, Mitchell, Moore, Ochiltree, Oldham, Parmer, Potter, Randall, Reagan, Roberts, Schleicher, Scurry, Sherman, Sterling, Swisher, Upton, Ward, Winkler, Yoakum
89	Kevin Sparks	Andrews, Armstrong, Bailey, Borden, Briscoe, Carson, Castro, Cochran, Coke, Crane, Dallam, Dawson, Deaf Smith, Ector, Gaines, Glasscock, Hall, Hansford, Hartley, Hemphill, Howard, Hutchinson, Irion, Lipscomb, Loving, Martin, Midland, Mitchell, Moore, Ochiltree, Oldham, Parmer, Potter, Randall, Reagan, Roberts, Schleicher, Scurry, Sherman, Sterling, Swisher, Upton, Ward, Winkler, Yoakum
