= Max Sherman (Texas politician) =

American politician (born 1935)

Member of the Texas Senate from the 31st district
- In office January 12, 1971 – September 2, 1977
- Preceded by: Grady Hazlewood
- Succeeded by: Robert Dale Price

President pro tempore of the Texas Senate
- In office December 18, 1973 – December 20, 1973
- Preceded by: O.H. "Ike" Harris
- Succeeded by: James P. Wallace

Personal details
- Born: Max Ray Sherman; January 19, 1935 (age 91) Viola, Arkansas, U.S.
- Party: Democratic
- Spouse: Gene Alice Wienbroer (m. 1961)
- Children: 2
- Education: Baylor University; University of Texas Law School
- Occupation: Lawyer; College president
- Sherman was voted the "Best Member of the Legislature" by Texas Monthly magazine during his state senate tenure from 1971 to 1977.

Max Ray Sherman (born January 19, 1935) is a Texas politician and educational administrator who served in the Texas State Senate from Amarillo, Texas, and was president of West Texas A&M University in Canyon, and dean of the Lyndon B. Johnson School of Public Affairs at the University of Texas at Austin.

Texas Senate
| Preceded by Grady Hazlewood | Texas State Senator from District 31 (Panhandle); 1971–1977 | Succeeded by Robert Dale "Bob" Price |
| Preceded by O.H. "Ike" Harris | Texas State Senate President Pro Tempore; 1974 | Succeeded by James P. Wallace |
