= Teel Bivins =

American diplomat and politician

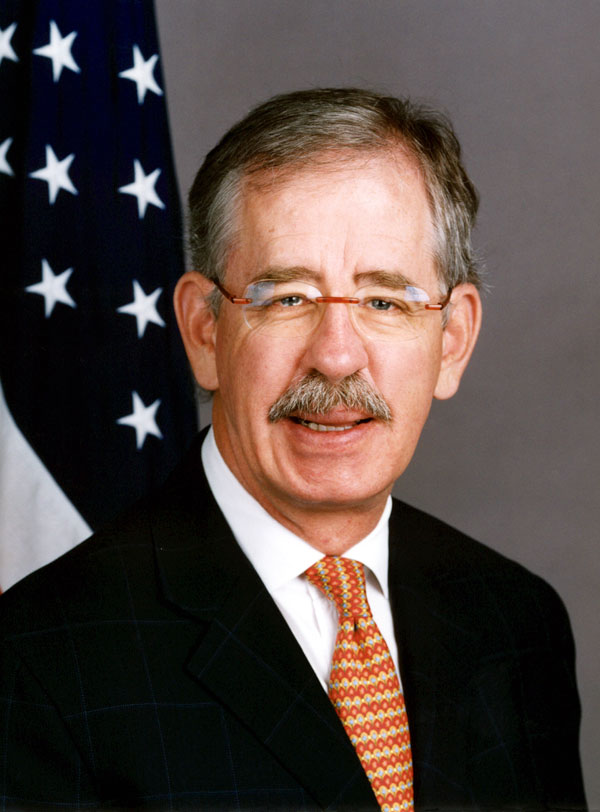

18th United States Ambassador to Sweden
- In office May 25, 2004 – January 31, 2006
- President: George W. Bush
- Preceded by: Charles A. Heimbold Jr.
- Succeeded by: Michael M. Wood

Member of the Texas Senate from the 31st district
- In office January 10, 1989 – January 12, 2004
- Preceded by: Bill Sarpalius
- Succeeded by: Kel Seliger

Personal details
- Born: Miles Teel Bivins; November 22, 1947 Amarillo, Texas, U.S.
- Died: October 26, 2009 (aged 61) Texas, U.S.
- Party: Republican
- Spouse(s): Cornelia, Nancy, Patricia
- Children: 4
- Relatives: Lee Bivins (great-grandfather)
- Education: Tulane University (BA); Southern Methodist University (JD)

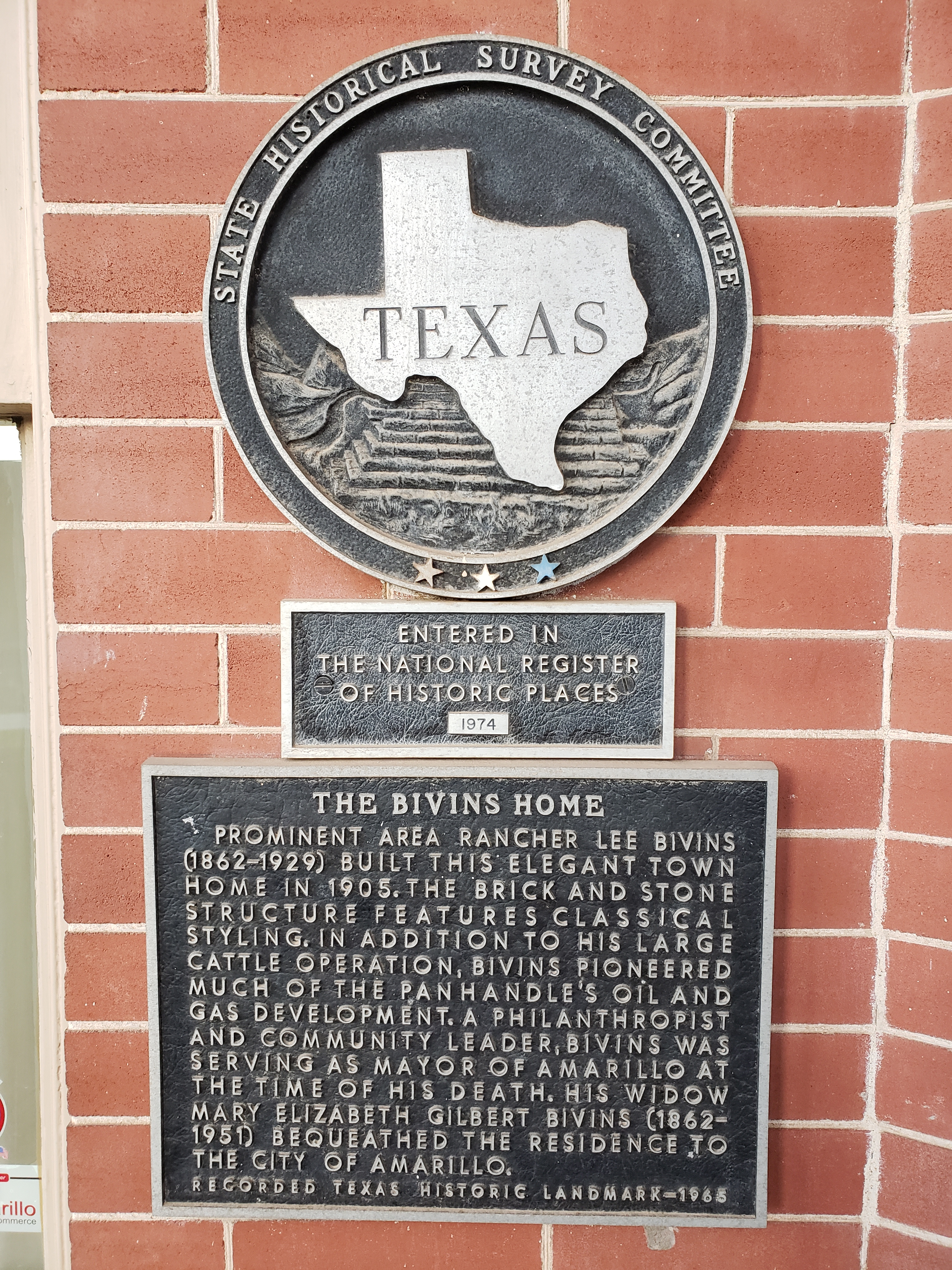
Texas Historical marker for the Bivins Home, 1000 South Polk

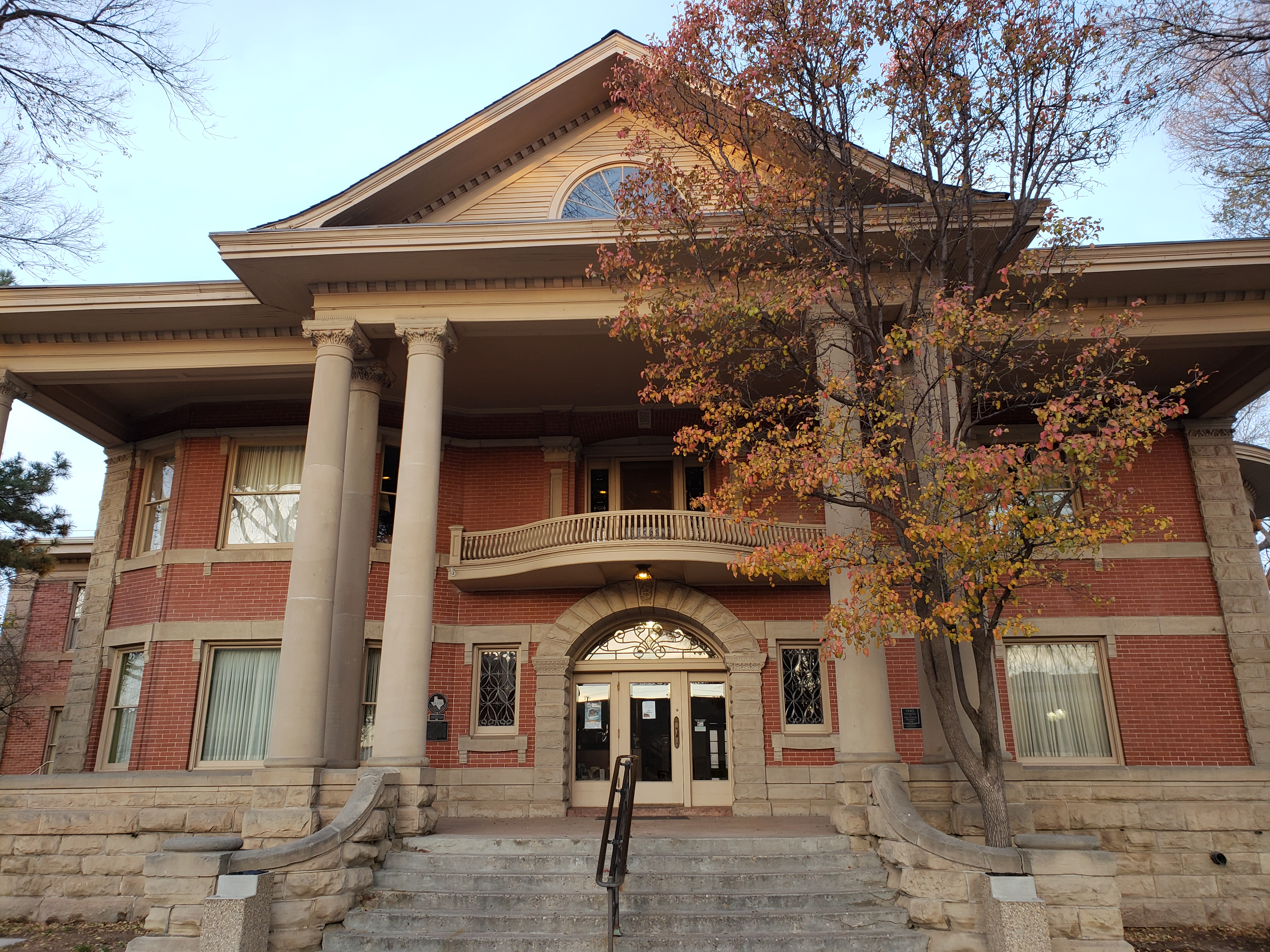
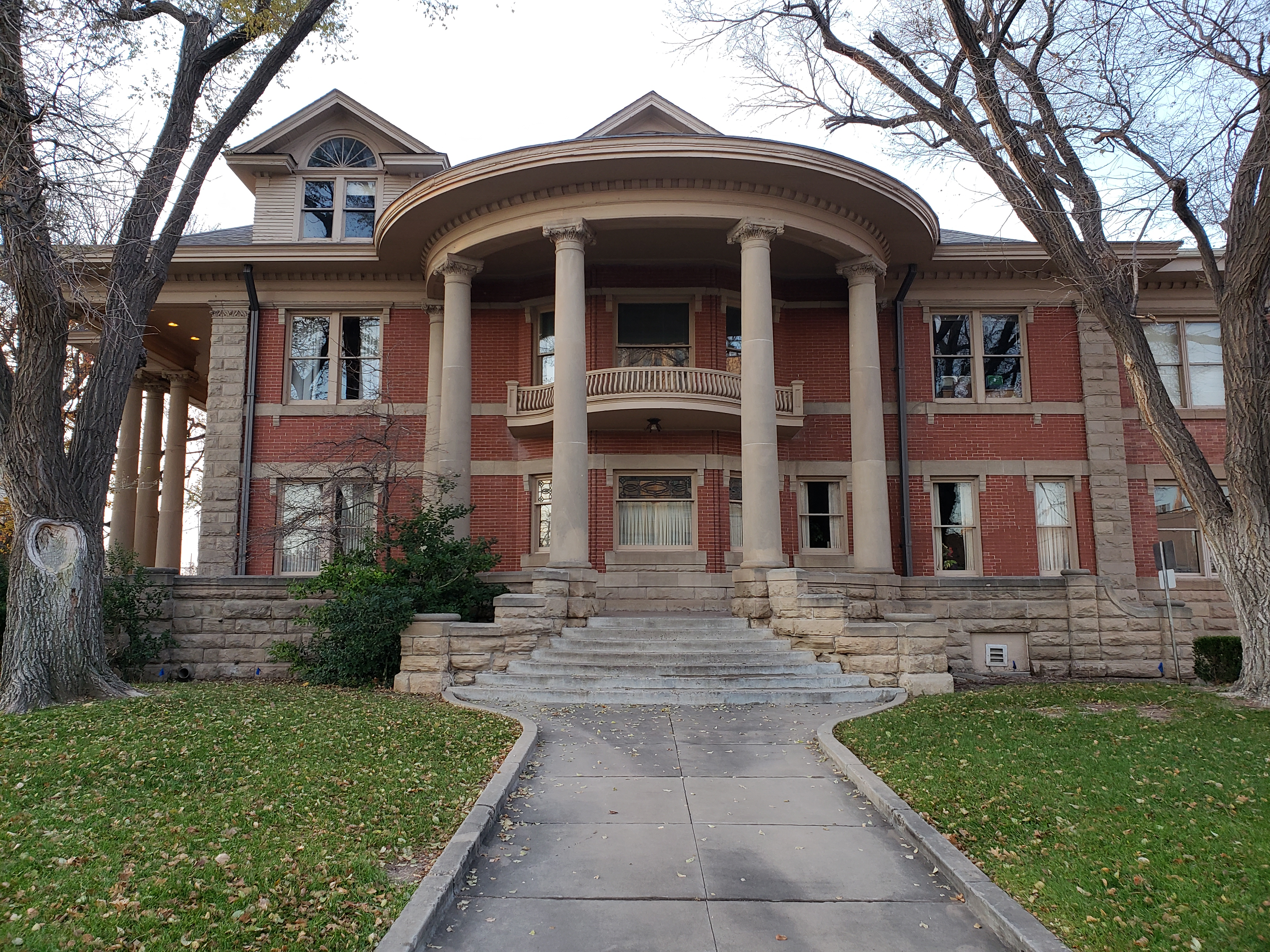
Bivins home front (left) and east side (right)

Miles Teel Bivins (November 22, 1947 – October 26, 2009) was an American diplomat and politician. He served as a Republican member for the 31st district of the Texas Senate, and also as the 18th United States Ambassador to the Kingdom of Sweden.

== Early life and education ==
Born in Amarillo, Texas, Bivins was the son of Betty Teel Lovell and Lee Truscott Bivins. He had three brothers. He attended Colorado Academy and then Tulane University, where he earned his Bachelor of Arts degree in 1970. He also attended Southern Methodist University's law school, where he earned his Juris Doctor degree in 1974.

== Career ==
In 1989, Bivins won election in the 31st district of the Texas Senate. He succeeded politician Bill Sarpalius. Bivins was listed in Texas Monthly's "The Best and Worst Legislators" four times. In 2004, he was succeeded by Kel Seliger in a special election.

Bivins then served as the 18th United States ambassador to Sweden, having been nominated by President George W. Bush. In 2006, Bivins became ill and resigned from his post; he was succeeded by Michael M. Wood.

Bivins returned to the United States to reside in Texas. He endowed the Teel Bivins Chair of Political Science at West Texas A&M University.

== Personal life ==
Bivins died on October 26, 2009, in Texas, at the age of 61.

== Election history ==
Election history of Bivins from 1992.

=== Most recent election ===
==== 2002 ====
Texas general election, 2002: Senate District 31
Party	Candidate	Votes	%	±%
Republican	Teel Bivins (Incumbent)	118,938	100.00	0.00
Majority		118,938	100.00	0.00
Turnout		118,938		+21.16
Republican hold				

=== Previous elections ===
==== 1998 ====
Texas general election, 1998: Senate District 31
Party	Candidate	Votes	%	±%
Republican	Teel Bivins (Incumbent)	98,165	100.00	0.00
Majority		98,165	100.00	0.00
Turnout		98,165		−15.34
Republican hold				

==== 1994 ====
Texas general election, 1994: Senate District 31
Party	Candidate	Votes	%	±%
Republican	Teel Bivins (Incumbent)	115,951	100.00	0.00
Majority		115,951	100.00	0.00
Turnout		115,951		−16.76
Republican hold				

==== 1992 ====
Texas general election, 1992: Senate District 31
Party	Candidate	Votes	%	±%
Republican	Teel Bivins (Incumbent)	139,302	100.00	
Majority		139,302	100.00	
Turnout		139,302		
Republican hold				

Texas Senate
Preceded by Bill Sarpalius	Texas State Senator from District 31 (Amarillo); 1989–2004	Succeeded by Kel Seliger
Diplomatic posts
Preceded by Charles A. Heimbold Jr.	U.S. Ambassador to Sweden; 2004–2006	Succeeded by Michael M. Wood
