= Bob Price (Texas politician) =

American politician (1927–2004)

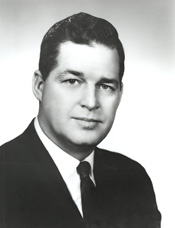

Member of the U.S. House of Representatives from Texas
- In office January 3, 1967 – January 3, 1975
- Preceded by: Walter E. Rogers
- Succeeded by: Jack Hightower
- Constituency: 18th district (1967–73); 13th district (1973–75)

Member of the Texas Senate from the 31st district
- In office January 18, 1978 – January 13, 1981
- Preceded by: Max Sherman
- Succeeded by: Bill Sarpalius

Personal details
- Born: Robert Dale Price; September 7, 1927 Reading, Kansas, U.S.
- Died: August 24, 2004 (aged 76) Pampa, Texas, U.S.
- Resting place: Fairview Cemetery in Pampa
- Party: Republican
- Spouse: Martha White
- Children: 3
- Education: Oklahoma State University (BS)
- Occupation: Rancher

Military service
- Allegiance: United States
- Branch/service: United States Air Force
- Years of service: 1951–1955
- Battles/wars: Korean War

Robert Dale Price (September 7, 1927 – August 24, 2004) was an American politician of the Republican Party who served in the United States House of Representatives from 1967 to 1975, and in the Texas Senate from 1978 to 1981.

== Biography ==
Price was born in Reading, Lyon County, Kansas and educated in the Reading public schools. He earned a Bachelor of Science degree in animal husbandry from Oklahoma State University–Stillwater in 1951.

=== Korean War ===
He served in the United States Air Force from 1951 to 1955, flying twenty-seven combat missions during the Korean War. For his service, he was awarded an Air Medal before returning to Texas after his honorable discharge in 1955.

=== Early career ===
After the war, he owned and operated a ranch in Texas. He served as a delegate at the Texas State Republican conventions in 1964, 1966, and 1968. He was also a delegate to the 1968 Republican National Convention in Miami Beach.

=== Congress ===
Price was elected as a Republican to the 90th and to the three succeeding Congresses (serving from January 3, 1967 to January 3, 1975). While in Congress, Price served on the House Agriculture Committee and on subcommittees on NASA oversight and spaceflight. Price voted against the Civil Rights Act of 1968. In 1971, Price was the sole Republican in the state's congressional delegation to vote for the Equal Employment Opportunity Act.

In 1974, Price lost his re-election bid to Democrat Jack Hightower.

=== Texas Senate ===
After unsuccessfully running for his old U.S. House seat in 1976, Price won a 1977 special election for a Texas Senate seat, with the slogan "Price is right for Texas". Price served in the Texas Senate until losing his re-election bid in 1980 to Democrat Bill Sarpalius.

=== Later campaigns and death ===
Price then had three unsuccessful runs for the U.S. House in 1988, 1990, and 1992.

He died on August 24, 2004, in Pampa, Texas; interment in Fairview Cemetery in Midland, Texas.

U.S. House of Representatives
Preceded by Walter E. Rogers	Member of the U.S. House of Representatives from Texas's 18th congressional district 1967–1973	Succeeded by Barbara Jordan (redistricted)
Preceded by Graham B. Purcell, Jr.	Member of the U.S. House of Representatives from Texas's 13th congressional district 1973–1975	Succeeded by Jack English Hightower
Texas Senate
Preceded by Max Sherman	Texas State Senator from District 31 (Amarillo); 1978–1981	Succeeded by Bill Sarpalius
