= Tecovas Creek =

River in the United States of America

Coordinates: 35°26′51″N 102°00′33″W

Tecovas Creek is a creek in Potter County, Texas, United States. Its source is in Bushland, Texas, and it flows into the Canadian River. It is crossed by Farm to Market Road 1061. It is located on the Frying Pan Ranch. The name comes from "techados," which means "roofed" in Spanish.

== See also ==
- List of rivers of Texas
