= Amarillo, Texas =

City in Texas, United States

- City
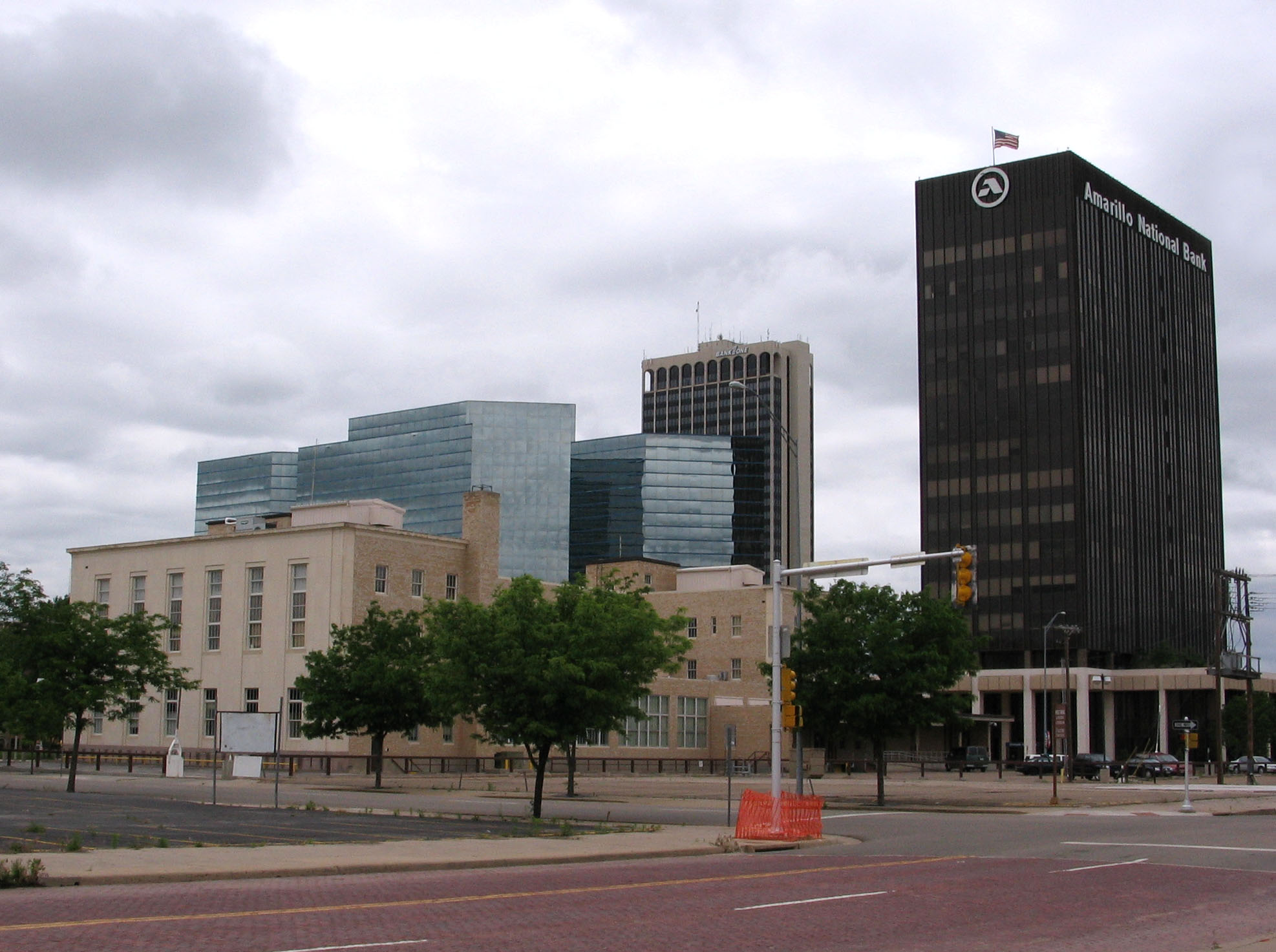
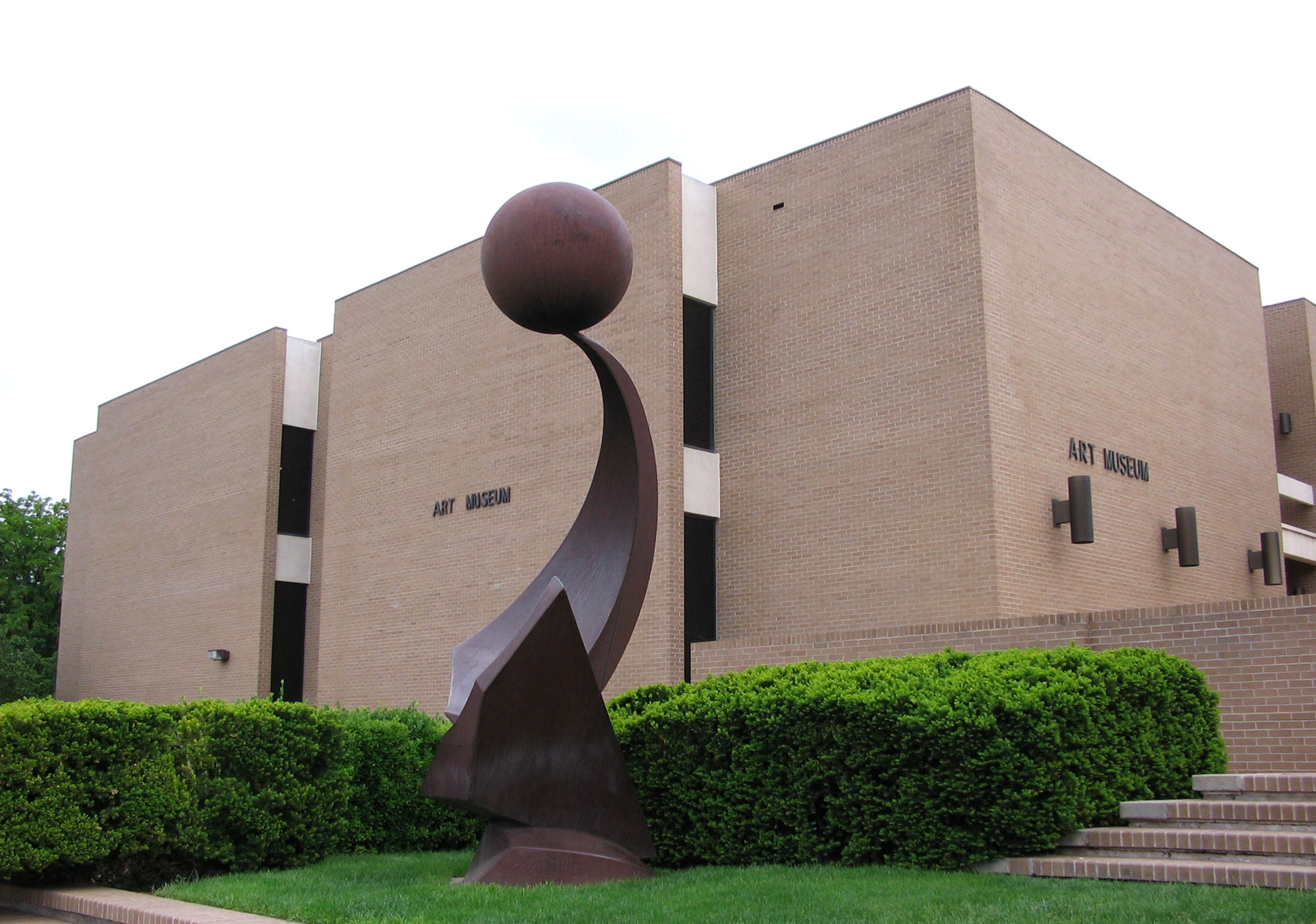
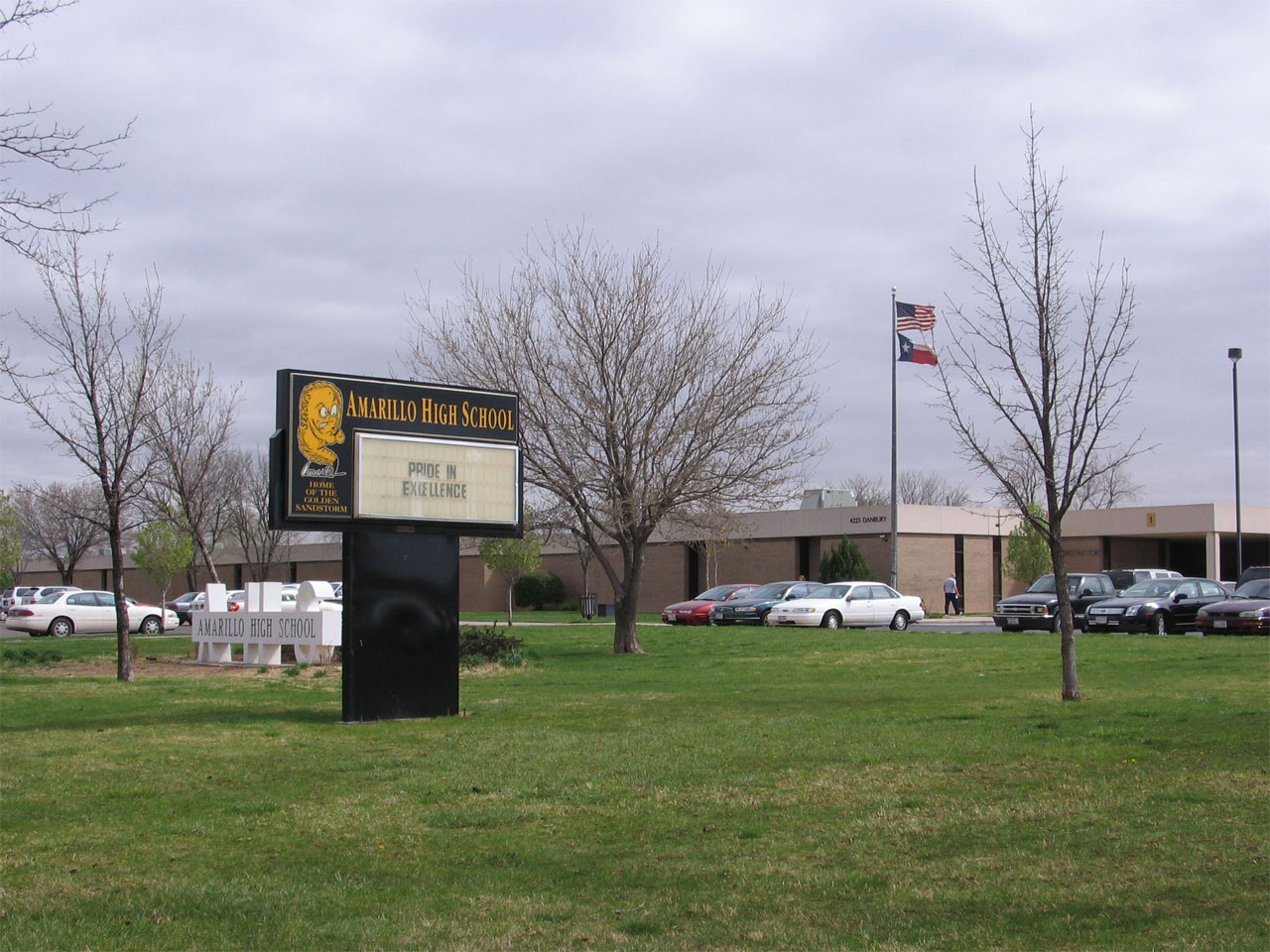
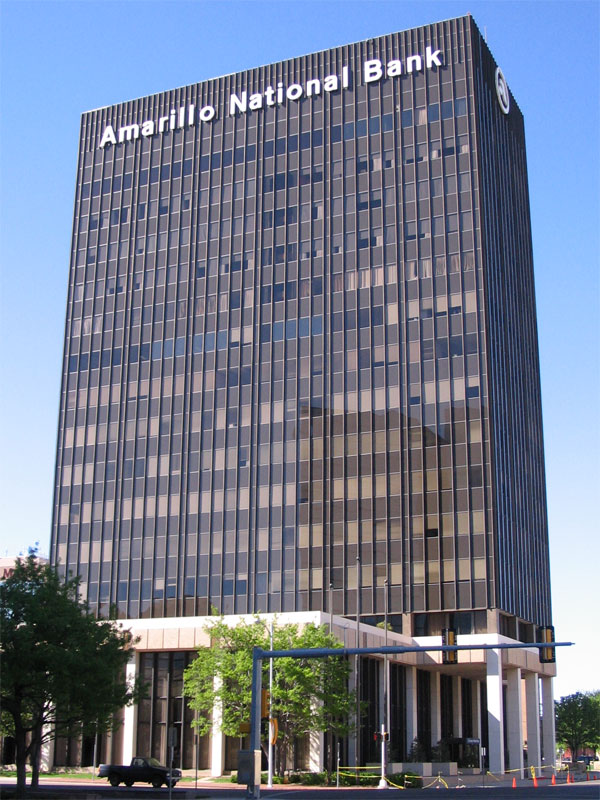
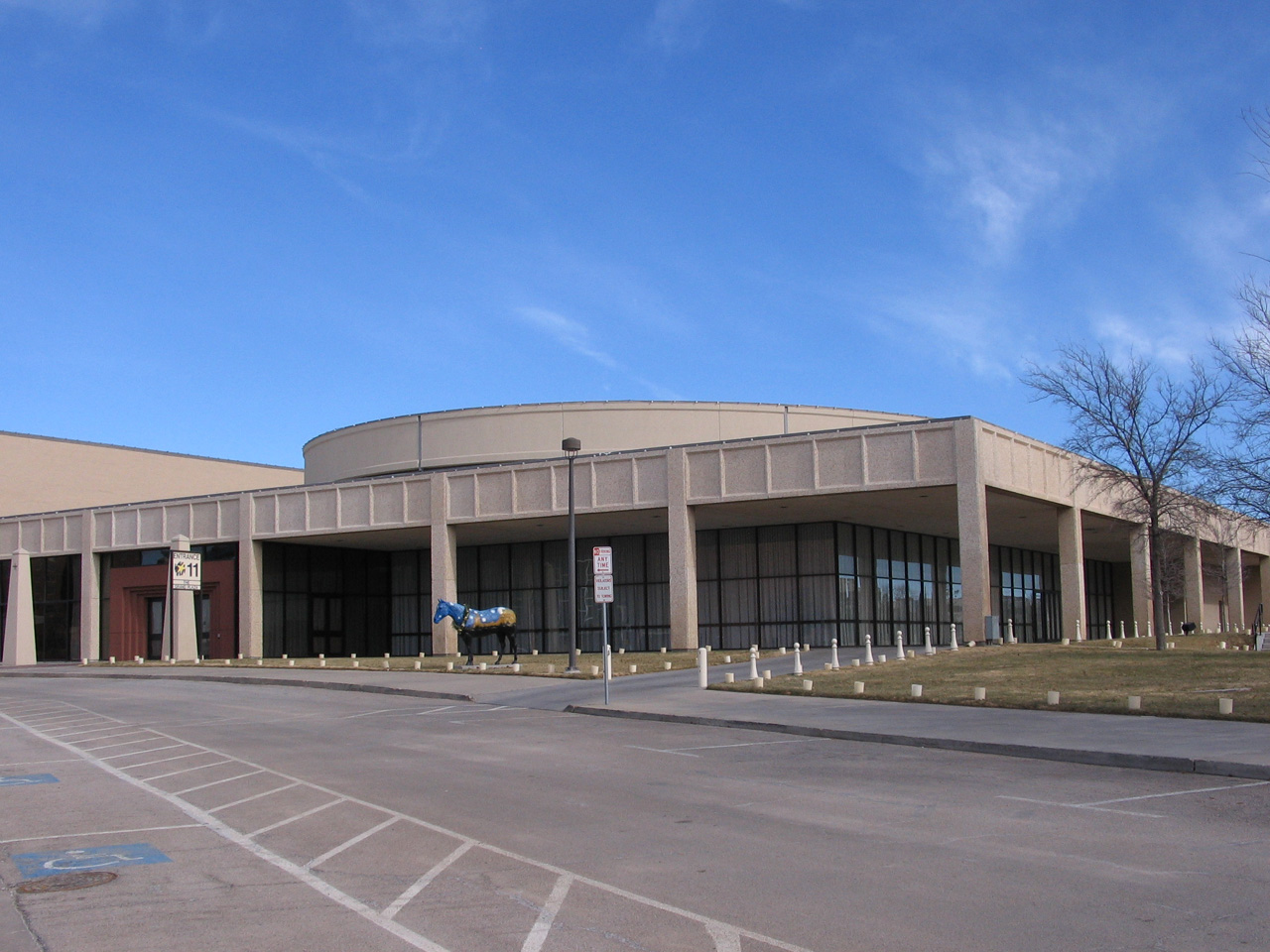
- Downtown Amarillo Amarillo Museum of Art Amarillo High School Amarillo National Bank Amarillo Civic Center

- Flag Seal
- Nicknames: Bomb City, Rotor City, Yellow City
- Interactive map of Amarillo, Texas
- Location within Texas Location within the United States Amarillo (North America)
- Coordinates: 35°11′57″N 101°50′43″W
- Country: United States
- State: Texas
- Counties: Potter and Randall
- Named for: Amarillo Lake

Government
  - Type: Council-Manager
  - Body: City Council
  - Mayor: Cole Stanley (Since May 2023)
  - Councilmember Place 1: Tim Reid (Since May 2025)
  - Councilmember Place 2: Don Tipps (Since May 2023)
  - Councilmember Place 3: David Prescott (Since June 2025)
  - Councilmember Place 4: Les Simpson (Since July 2023)

Area
  - City: 103.86 sq mi (268.99 km^{2})
  - Land: 102.31 sq mi (264.97 km^{2})
  - Water: 1.56 sq mi (4.03 km^{2})
- Elevation: 3,662 ft (1,116 m)

Population (2020)
  - City: 200,393
  - Density: 1,950/sq mi (752/km^{2})
  - Urban: 205,860 (US: 187th)
  - Urban density: 2,451/sq mi (946/km^{2})
  - Metro: 269,703 (US: 182nd)
- Demonym: Amarilloan
- Time zone: UTC−6 (CST)
  - Summer (DST): UTC−5 (CDT)
- ZIP Codes: 79101–79111, 79114, 79116–79121, 79123–79124, 79159, 79163, 79166–79168, 79171–79172, 79174, 79178, 79182, 79185, 79187, 79189
- Area code: 806
- FIPS code: 48-03000
- GNIS feature ID: 2409694
- Website: amarillo.gov

Amarillo (/ˌæməˈrɪloʊ/ AM-ə-RIL-oh; Spanish for "yellow") is a city in the U.S. state of Texas and the county seat of Potter County, though most of the southern half of the city extends into Randall County. It is the 17th-most populous city in Texas and the most populous city in the Texas panhandle. The estimated population of Amarillo was 203,729 as of 2024, comprising nearly half of the panhandle's population. The Amarillo metropolitan area had an estimated population of 308,297 as of 2020.

The city of Amarillo, originally named Oneida, is situated in the Llano Estacado region. The availability of the railroad and freight service provided by the Fort Worth and Denver Railway contributed to the city's growth as a cattle-marketing center in the late 19th century.

Amarillo was once the self-proclaimed "Helium Capital of the World" for having one of the country's most productive helium fields. The city is also known as "The Yellow Rose of Texas" (as the city takes its name from the Spanish word for yellow), "Yellow City" for its name, and "Rotor City, USA" for its V-22 Osprey hybrid aircraft assembly plant. Amarillo operates one of the largest meat-packing areas in the United States. Pantex, the only nuclear weapons assembly and disassembly facility in the country, is also a major employer, with the location of this facility giving rise to the nickname "Bomb City".

== History ==
During April 1887, John T. Berry, from Abilene, Texas, established a site for a town, choosing a well-watered section along the right-of-way of the Fort Worth and Denver City Railway that was building across the Texas Panhandle. Berry and merchants from Colorado City, Texas wanted to make his new townsite the region's main trading center. On August 30, 1887, the site won the election for a county seat to be established for Potter County. Availability of the railroad's freight service made the town a fast-growing cattle-marketing center.

The settlement originally was called Oneida; it later changed its name to Amarillo (the Spanish word for the color yellow). This probably had been suggested by yellow wildflowers that were plentiful during the spring and summer, or the nearby Amarillo Lake and Amarillo Creek, named in turn for the yellow soil along their banks and shores. Early residents originally pronounced the city's name more similar to the Spanish pronunciation /ˌɑːməˈriːjoʊ/ ah-mə-REE-yoh, but it later was supplanted by the current pronunciation.

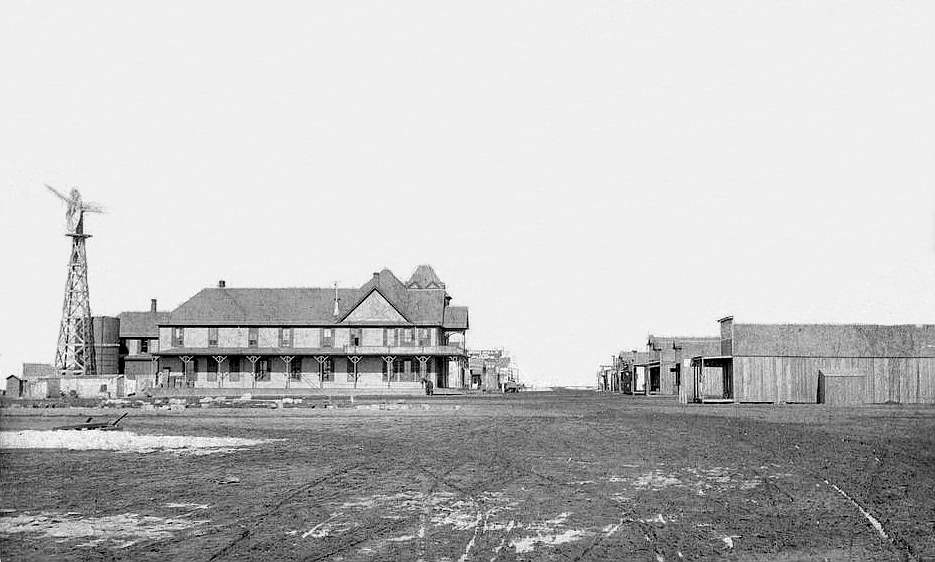
Amarillo in 1889, three weeks after incorporation

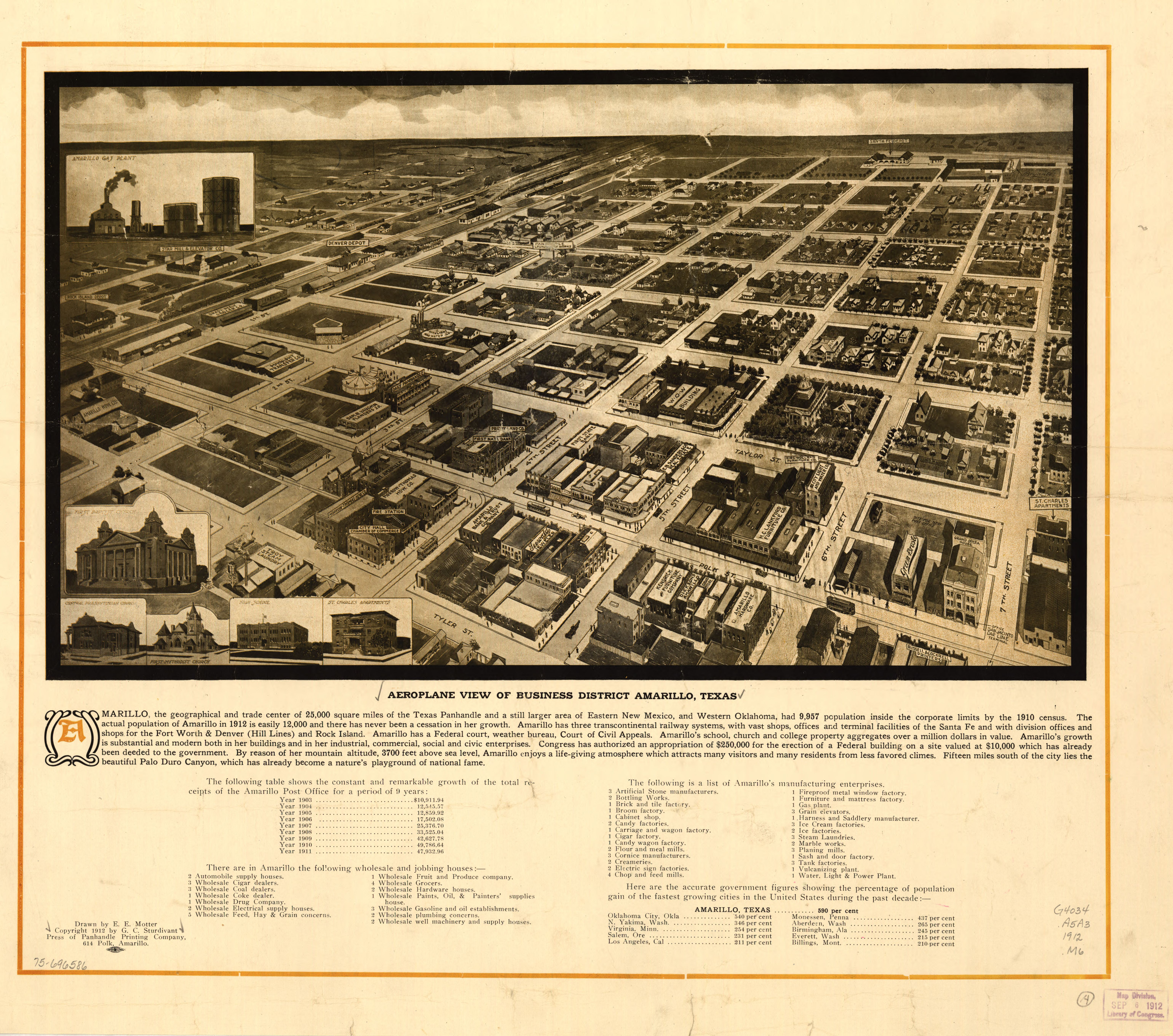
An aerial view of the Amarillo business district in 1912

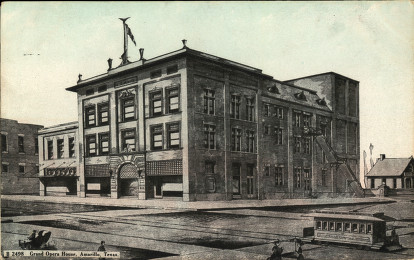
Grand Opera House, Amarillo, Texas (postcard, circa 1909–1924)

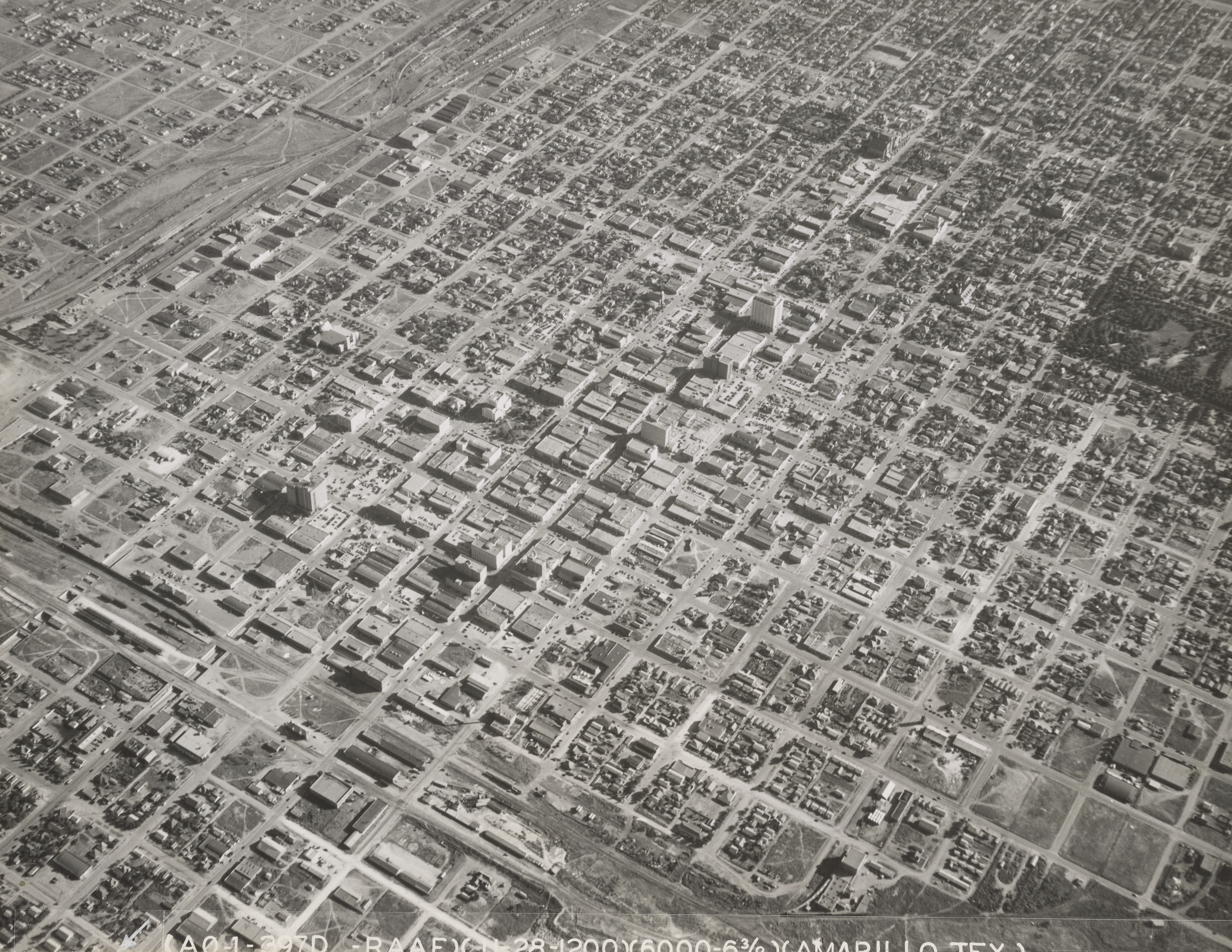
Downtown Amarillo in 1944

On June 19, 1888, Henry B. Sanborn, who is given credit as the "Father of Amarillo", and his business partner Joseph F. Glidden began buying land to move Amarillo to the east after arguing that Berry's site was on low ground and would flood during rainstorms. Sanborn offered to trade lots in the new location to businesses in the original city's site and help with the expense of moving to new buildings. His incentives gradually won over some people who moved their businesses to Polk Street in the new commercial district. Heavy rains almost flooded Berry's part of the town in 1889, prompting even more people to move to Sanborn's location. This eventually led to another county-seat election, which made Sanborn's site the new county seat in 1893.

By the late 1890s, Amarillo had emerged as one of the world's busiest cattle-shipping points, and its population grew significantly. The city became a grain elevator, milling, and feed-manufacturing center after an increase in wheat and small grains production during the early 1900s. Discovery of natural gas in 1918 and oil three years later brought oil and gas companies to the Amarillo area.

The United States government bought the Cliffside Gas Field with high helium content in 1927 and the Federal Bureau of Mines began operating the Amarillo Helium plant two years later. The plant was the sole producer of commercial helium in the world for many years. The U.S. National Helium Reserve is stored in the Bush Dome Reservoir at the Cliffside facility.

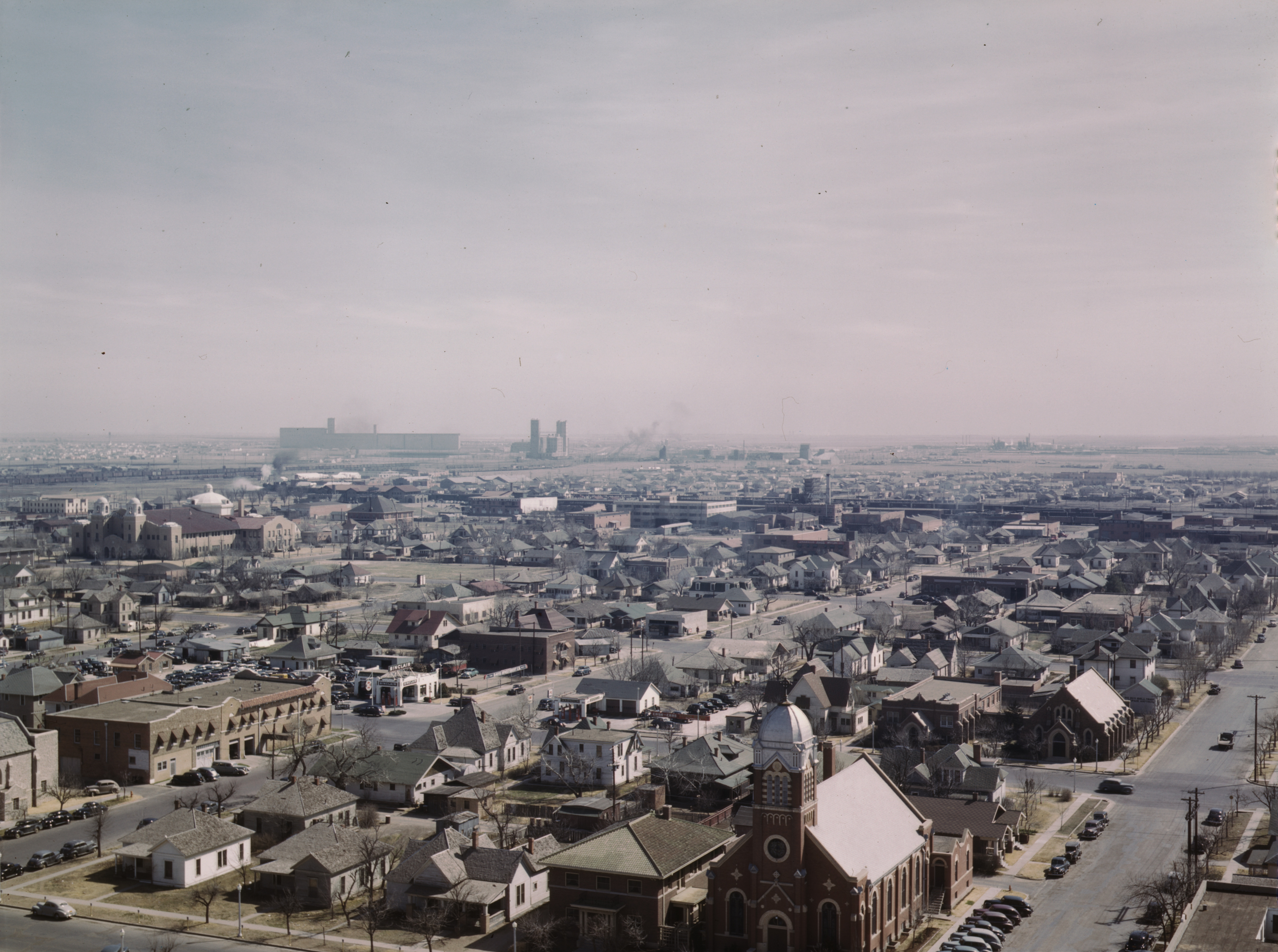
Amarillo, March 1943

Amarillo was hit by the Dust Bowl in the 1930s and entered an economic depression.

World War II led the establishment of Amarillo Army Air Field in east Amarillo and the nearby Pantex Army Ordnance Plant, which produced bombs and ammunition. After the end of the war, both of the facilities were closed. The Pantex Plant was reopened in 1950 and produced nuclear weapons throughout the Cold War.

In 1951, the army air base was reactivated as Amarillo Air Force Base and expanded to accommodate a Strategic Air Command B-52 Stratofortress wing. The arrival of servicemen and their families ended the city's depression. Between 1950 and 1960, Amarillo's population grew from 74,443 to 137,969. However, the closure of Amarillo Air Force Base on December 31, 1968, contributed to a decrease in population to 127,010 by 1970. In 1970, the U.S. Census Bureau reported Amarillo's population as 6.1% Hispanic and 88.5% non-Hispanic white.

In the 1980s, ASARCO, Iowa Beef Processors (present-day Tyson Foods), Owens-Corning, and Weyerhaeuser built plants at Amarillo. The Eastridge neighborhood houses many immigrants from countries such as Vietnam, Laos, and Burma, many finding employment at the nearby Iowa Beef Processors plant. The following decade, Amarillo's city limits encompassed 60 square miles (155 km^{2}) in Potter and Randall Counties.

Following the lead of the Fort Worth and Denver City Railway, predecessors of the Atchison, Topeka and Santa Fe Railway and Chicago, Rock Island and Pacific Railroad had established services to and from Amarillo. These three carriers maintained substantial freight and passenger depots and repair facilities in the city through most of the 20th century and were major employers within the community.

U.S. Routes 60, 87, 287, and 66 intersected at Amarillo, making it a major tourist stop with numerous motels, restaurants, and curio shops.

== Geography ==
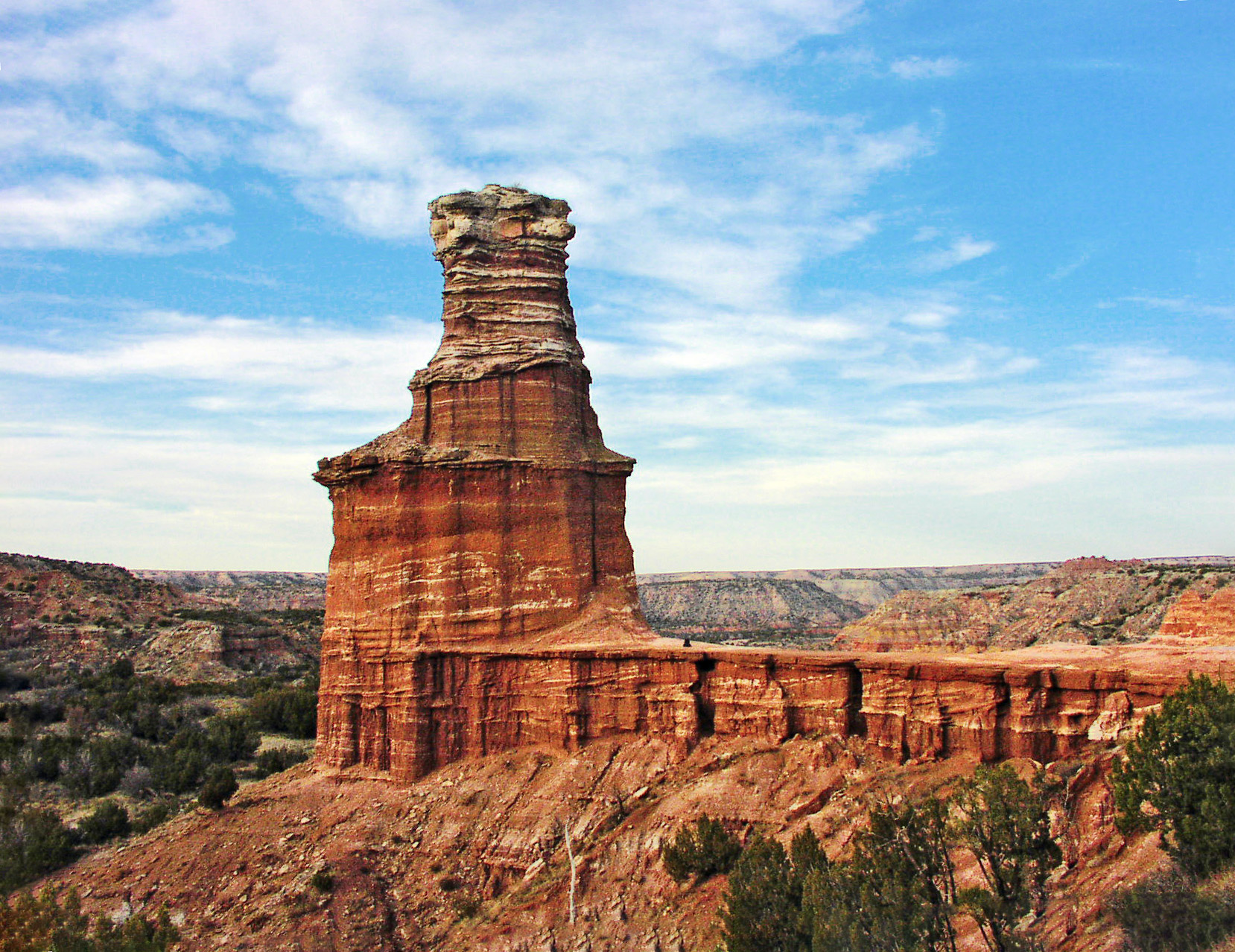
Lighthouse pinnacle in Palo Duro Canyon: The canyon system is located south of the city.

Amarillo is located near the middle of the Texas Panhandle. It does not share similar weather characteristics with south and east Texas. It is situated in the grasslands of the Texas Panhandle and is surrounded by dense prairie and desert. Amarillo is infamous for its unpredictable weather patterns, with broad daily temperature changes, raging winds, devastating hailstorms and "northers", long periods of drought, late frosts, spring tornadoes, dust storms, and floods.

Though urbanization, agricultural farming, and construction have taken place over the last century in and around Amarillo, the native grasslands that dominate this region have remained largely untouched. The region's surface is relatively flat and has little soil drainage. Due to the lack of developed drainage, much of the rainfall either evaporates, infiltrates into the ground, or accumulates in playa lakes. According to the United States Census Bureau, the city has a total area of 90.3 square miles (234 km^{2}), with 89.9 sq mi (233 km^{2}) of it land and 0.4 sq mi (1.0 km^{2}) of it (0.50%) covered by water. The Amarillo metropolitan area covers four counties: Armstrong, Carson, Potter, and Randall. Amarillo sits closer in proximity to the Oklahoma, New Mexico and Colorado state capitals than it does to Austin.

Flowing about 20 miles (32 km) northeast of Amarillo is the Canadian River, which divides the Western High Plains ecological region. The southern divide of the Western High Plains is the Llano Estacado or Staked Plains geographical region. The river is dammed to form Lake Meredith, a major source of drinking water in the Texas Panhandle region. The city is situated near the Panhandle Field, in a productive gas and oil area, covering 200,000 acres (81,000 ha) in Hartley, Potter, Moore, Hutchinson, Carson, Gray, Wheeler, and Collingsworth Counties. The Potter County portion had the nation's largest natural gas reserve.

The Palo Duro Canyon State Park is the United States' second largest canyon system, after the Grand Canyon and is located Approximately 25 miles (40 km) southeast of Amarillo is Palo Duro Canyon. Palo Duro Canyon has a distinct hoodoo that resembles a lighthouse.

The underground structures known as Amarillo Mountains are an extension of the Arbuckles of Oklahoma and the Ouachita of Arkansas and Oklahoma. They are some thousands of feet underground. The range was discovered by pioneer oilmen. Some of the peaks are believed to be 10,000 feet (3,000 m) high.[21] The tallest peak is reported to be 2,500 feet (760 m) underground in northeastern Potter County under the Alibates Flint Quarries National Monument.

=== Climate ===
Amarillo, Texas

Climate chart (precipitation, max. and min. temperature)
J	F	M	A	M	J	J	A	S	O	N	D
0.7 52 25	0.5 56 28	1.3 65 35	1.5 72 43	2.3 81 53	2.9 90 62	2.8 93 66	2.9 91 65	1.7 84 58	1.8 73 45	0.8 61 34	0.7 52 26
- █ Average max. and min. temperatures in °F
- █ Precipitation totals in inches
Metric conversion
J	F	M	A	M	J	J	A	S	O	N	D
18 11 −4	13 13 −2	33 18 2	38 22 6	58 27 12	74 32 17	71 34 19	74 33 18	43 29 14	46 23 7	20 16 1	18 11 −3
- █ Average max. and min. temperatures in °C
- █ Precipitation totals in mm

Like most of the Texas Panhandle, Amarillo has a temperate semi-arid climate (Köppen climate classification BSk). Both the city and most of the county as a whole lie in USDA Plant Hardiness Zone 7a. Amarillo is characterized by a winter season featuring large diurnal temperature variation, great day-to-day variability, possible sudden and/or severe Arctic air outbreaks (in Texas, called "blue northers"), possible blizzards and hot summers with generally low humidity. The average annual precipitation is 20.4 inches or 520 millimeters. Much of Amarillo's precipitation falls during heavy convective showers and thunderstorms during the late spring and summer months.

According to 'Cities Ranked and Rated' (Bert Sperling and Peter Sander), Amarillo averages 48 days per year during which thunder and lightning is reported. This is above the national average. These storms can be severe: Amarillo and the Texas Panhandle are situated in the western portion of "Tornado Alley" and are prone to severe weather events, occurring primarily between April and July. Severe thunderstorms can produce damaging straight-line winds, large hail, tornadoes, and flash flooding. Tornadoes have occurred in and around the city in 1968, 1970, 1982, 1986, 2001, 2007, 2013, 2015, and 2016. The strongest tornado to ever hit Amarillo was a deadly F4 tornado that struck the city in the nighttime hours of May 15, 1949. Amarillo's most densely populated areas, on the south and east sides of the city, had catastrophic damage; the tornado killed 7 people and injured more than 80 others. The monthly daily average temperature ranges from 38.6 °F (3.7 °C) in January to 79.6 °F (26.4 °C) in July. Sunny weather prevails year-round, with nearly 3300 hours of bright sunshine annually. The National Weather Service in Amarillo forecasts and provides climatic data for the city.

Extreme temperatures range from −16 °F (−26.7 °C) on February 12, 1899 to 111 °F (43.9 °C) on June 26, 2011, but lows do not typically dip to 0 °F or −17.8 °C in most years, while highs above 100 °F or 37.8 °C are seen on 4.7 days on average. On average, there are 5.9 days of lows at or below 10 °F or −12.2 °C, 8.8 days where the temperature fails to rise above freezing, and 61 days of 90 °F (32.2 °C)+ highs. Unlike in the Rio Grande Valley or eastern portions of Texas, days where the low does not fall below 70 °F or 21.1 °C are relatively rare, due to the aridity and elevation. Blizzards occur occasionally, but snowfall is typically light, averaging nearly 18 inches or 46 centimeters seasonally and the median figure is near 10 inches or 25 centimeters. Amarillo is also recorded as the windiest city in the U.S. by the Weather Channel.

Climate data for Amarillo, Texas, 1991–2020 normals, (Note: Mean monthly maxima and minima (i.e. the expected highest and lowest temperature readings at any point during the year or given month) calculated based on data at said location from 1981 to 2010.) extremes 1892–present
Month	Jan	Feb	Mar	Apr	May	Jun	Jul	Aug	Sep	Oct	Nov	Dec	Year
Record high °F (°C)	83 (28)	89 (32)	99 (37)	99 (37)	104 (40)	111 (44)	110 (43)	108 (42)	105 (41)	99 (37)	89 (32)	83 (28)	111 (44)
Mean maximum °F (°C)	71.4 (21.9)	76.5 (24.7)	83.5 (28.6)	88.6 (31.4)	94.7 (34.8)	99.7 (37.6)	100.3 (37.9)	98.2 (36.8)	95.2 (35.1)	88.6 (31.4)	79.7 (26.5)	71.8 (22.1)	102.4 (39.1)
Mean daily maximum °F (°C)	52.2 (11.2)	56.1 (13.4)	64.8 (18.2)	72.4 (22.4)	80.9 (27.2)	89.7 (32.1)	92.9 (33.8)	91.0 (32.8)	84.0 (28.9)	73.0 (22.8)	61.3 (16.3)	51.9 (11.1)	72.5 (22.5)
Daily mean °F (°C)	38.6 (3.7)	41.8 (5.4)	49.8 (9.9)	57.5 (14.2)	66.8 (19.3)	76.1 (24.5)	79.6 (26.4)	78.1 (25.6)	70.9 (21.6)	59.2 (15.1)	47.4 (8.6)	38.8 (3.8)	58.7 (14.8)
Mean daily minimum °F (°C)	24.9 (−3.9)	27.5 (−2.5)	34.8 (1.6)	42.5 (5.8)	52.6 (11.4)	62.4 (16.9)	66.4 (19.1)	65.3 (18.5)	57.8 (14.3)	45.4 (7.4)	33.5 (0.8)	25.7 (−3.5)	44.9 (7.2)
Mean minimum °F (°C)	7.4 (−13.7)	8.6 (−13.0)	16.8 (−8.4)	27.2 (−2.7)	37.5 (3.1)	50.4 (10.2)	57.4 (14.1)	56.6 (13.7)	41.8 (5.4)	29.0 (−1.7)	16.0 (−8.9)	6.8 (−14.0)	0.3 (−17.6)
Record low °F (°C)	−11 (−24)	−16 (−27)	−3 (−19)	13 (−11)	26 (−3)	38 (3)	51 (11)	48 (9)	30 (−1)	12 (−11)	0 (−18)	−8 (−22)	−16 (−27)
Average precipitation inches (mm)	0.71 (18)	0.53 (13)	1.27 (32)	1.45 (37)	2.27 (58)	2.85 (72)	2.82 (72)	2.86 (73)	1.69 (43)	1.75 (44)	0.75 (19)	0.71 (18)	19.66 (499)
Average snowfall inches (cm)	4.0 (10)	3.5 (8.9)	1.9 (4.8)	0.5 (1.3)	0.2 (0.51)	0.0 (0.0)	0.0 (0.0)	0.0 (0.0)	0.0 (0.0)	0.7 (1.8)	2.6 (6.6)	3.8 (9.7)	17.2 (44)
Average precipitation days (≥ 0.01 in)	3.9	4.3	6.0	5.6	7.7	8.5	7.2	8.2	6.3	5.3	4.0	4.7	71.7
Average snowy days (≥ 0.1 in)	2.6	2.2	1.9	0.4	0.0	0.0	0.0	0.0	0.0	0.1	1.1	2.8	11.1
Average relative humidity (%)	58.1	58.5	51.7	48.3	54.2	56.3	53.3	58.4	61.0	55.9	58.6	59.1	56.1
Average dew point °F (°C)	18.1 (−7.7)	21.9 (−5.6)	25.9 (−3.4)	32.9 (0.5)	44.1 (6.7)	54.3 (12.4)	57.6 (14.2)	58.1 (14.5)	52.2 (11.2)	39.4 (4.1)	28.8 (−1.8)	20.5 (−6.4)	37.8 (3.2)
Mean monthly sunshine hours	222.1	215.2	268.7	301.1	325.1	343.0	353.6	323.5	264.5	266.4	211.5	201.5	3,296.2
Percentage possible sunshine	71	70	72	77	75	79	80	78	71	76	68	66	74
Source: NOAA (sun, relative humidity, and dew point 1961–1990)

== Demographics ==
Historical population
Census	Pop.	Note	%±
1890	482		—
1900	1,442		199.2%
1910	9,957		590.5%
1920	15,494		55.6%
1930	43,132		178.4%
1940	51,686		19.8%
1950	74,246		43.6%
1960	137,969		85.8%
1970	127,010		−7.9%
1980	149,230		17.5%
1990	157,571		5.6%
2000	173,627		10.2%
2010	190,695		9.8%
2020	200,393		5.1%
U.S. Decennial Census; Texas Almanac: 1850–2000

Amarillo city, Texas – racial and ethnic composition Note: the US Census treats Hispanic/Latino as an ethnic category. This table excludes Latinos from the racial categories and assigns them to a separate category. Hispanics/Latinos may be of any race.
Race / Ethnicity (NH = Non-Hispanic)	Pop 2000	Pop 2010	Pop 2020	% 2000	% 2010	% 2020
White alone (NH)	118,821	113,929	104,026	68.43%	59.74%	51.91%
Black or African American alone (NH)	10,067	11,977	13,808	5.80%	6.28%	6.89%
Native American or Alaska Native alone (NH)	948	928	1,053	0.55%	0.49%	0.53%
Asian alone (NH)	3,484	5,883	8,205	2.01%	3.09%	4.09%
Native Hawaiian or Pacific Islander alone (NH)	42	62	55	0.02%	0.03%	0.03%
Other race alone (NH)	117	208	851	0.07%	0.11%	0.42%
Mixed race or Multiracial (NH)	2,201	2,827	7,093	1.27%	1.48%	3.54%
Hispanic or Latino (any race)	37,947	54,881	65,302	21.86%	28.78%	32.59%
Total	173,627	190,695	200,393	100.00%	100.00%	100.00%

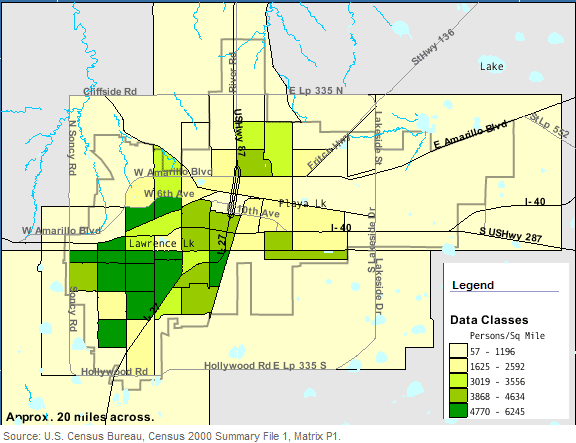
This map shows the city's average number of inhabitants per square mile of land in 2000.

=== 2020 census ===
As of the 2020 census, Amarillo had a population of 200,393, a 5.1% increase from the 190,695 counted at the 2010 census. The median age was 35.9 years; 25.7% of residents were under the age of 18 and 15.4% were 65 years of age or older. For every 100 females there were 94.4 males, and for every 100 females age 18 and over there were 91.6 males age 18 and over.

There were 78,706 households, of which 32.7% had children under the age of 18 living in them. Of all households, 44.4% were married-couple households, 19.9% were households with a male householder and no spouse or partner present, and 29.1% were households with a female householder and no spouse or partner present. About 29.3% of all households were made up of individuals and 11.1% had someone living alone who was 65 years of age or older.

There were 87,340 housing units, of which 9.9% were vacant. Among occupied housing units, 59.5% were owner-occupied and 40.5% were renter-occupied. The homeowner vacancy rate was 1.7% and the rental vacancy rate was 12.7%.

98.3% of residents lived in urban areas, while 1.7% lived in rural areas.

Racial composition as of the 2020 census
Race	Percent
White	61.2%
Black or African American	7.3%
American Indian and Alaska Native	1.1%
Asian	4.2%
Native Hawaiian and Other Pacific Islander	<0.1%
Some other race	10.5%
Two or more races	15.6%

=== 2010 census ===
As of the 2010 census, there were 190,695 people residing in Amarillo, an increase of 9.8% since the 173,627 counted at the 2000 census.

=== 2000 census ===
As of the 2000 census, there were 173,627 people residing in Amarillo.

=== American Community Survey ===
The median value of an owner-occupied housing unit was $140,030, median homeowner costs with a mortgage were $1,272 and without a mortgage $479, and the median gross rent was $876 from 2016 to 2020. Amarillo had a median household income of $52,941 and a per capita income of $28,274; an estimated 15.4% of the population lived at or below the poverty line.

The median income for a family was $64,632. Married-couple families had a median income of $80,819, and non-family households had a median income of $31,663; about 15.4% of families were below the poverty line, including 20% of those under age 18, 14.1% ages 18 – 64, and 12.2% of those age 65 or over.

=== Religion ===
Part of the Bible Belt, Christianity is the predominant religion in Amarillo and its metropolitan area. There are more than 200 churches in the area as of 2013.

According to Sperling's BestPlaces in 2021, 77.83% of the population identified as religious, with 74.53% Christian. Baptists made up 40.2% of the Christian population and Catholics were 13.3% of the local population. Methodists and Pentecostals were the next largest Christian groups, followed by Presbyterians, Mormons, Episcopalians or Anglicans, and Lutherans. Approximately 8.1% of the population were of a different Christian faith. In 2021, about 0.1% of Amarillo's residents identified with Judaism and 2.1% were Muslim. An estimated 1.1% followed an Eastern religion such as Buddhism or Hinduism.

== Economy ==
Amarillo is considered the regional economic center for the Texas Panhandle, as well as Eastern New Mexico and the Oklahoma Panhandle. The meat packing industry is a major employer in Amarillo; about one-quarter of the United States' beef supply is processed in the area. The city also holds the headquarters for the Texas Cattle Feeders Association. Petroleum extraction is also a major industry. The helium industry decreased in significance after the federal government privatized local operations in the late 1990s. Bell Helicopter Textron opened a helicopter assembly plant near the city's international airport in 1999.

The city's largest employer in 2005 was Tyson Foods, with 3,700 employees. The Amarillo Independent School District was next with 3,659 employees followed by Pantex, Baptist St. Anthony's Health Care System, City of Amarillo, Northwest Texas Healthcare System, Amarillo College, Walmart, and United Supermarkets. Other major employers include Bell Helicopter Textron, Owens-Corning, Amarillo National Bank and ASARCO.

Approximately 14 million acres (57,000 km^{2}) of agricultural land surrounds the city with corn, wheat, and cotton as the primary crops. Other crops in the area include sorghum, silage, hay, and soybeans. The Texas Panhandle, particularly in Hereford, Texas, serves as a fast-growing milk producing area as several multimillion-dollar state of the art dairies were built in the early 2000s.

The Amarillo Economic Development Corporation (AEDC), funded by a city sales tax, provides aggressive incentive packages to existing and prospective employers. In the mid-to-late 1990s, the AEDC gained notoriety by sending mock checks to businesses across the country, placing full-page advertisements in The Wall Street Journal, and paying an annual $1 million subsidy to American Airlines to retain jet service. The AEDC is largely responsible for bringing Bell Helicopter Textron's development of the V-22 Osprey hybrid aircraft and the future site of Marine One assembly in Amarillo.

From 2020 to 2021, Amarillo experienced its greatest amount of economic development in 30 years. Amazon, Asset Protection Unit, and Texas Tech University Vet School were named some major organizations contributing to the city and metropolitan area's economic growth. Through the COVID-19 pandemic in Texas, the Amarillo Chamber of Commerce announced a new initiative to help local businesses rebound from the pandemic. Its tourism industry also rebounded.

== Arts and culture ==
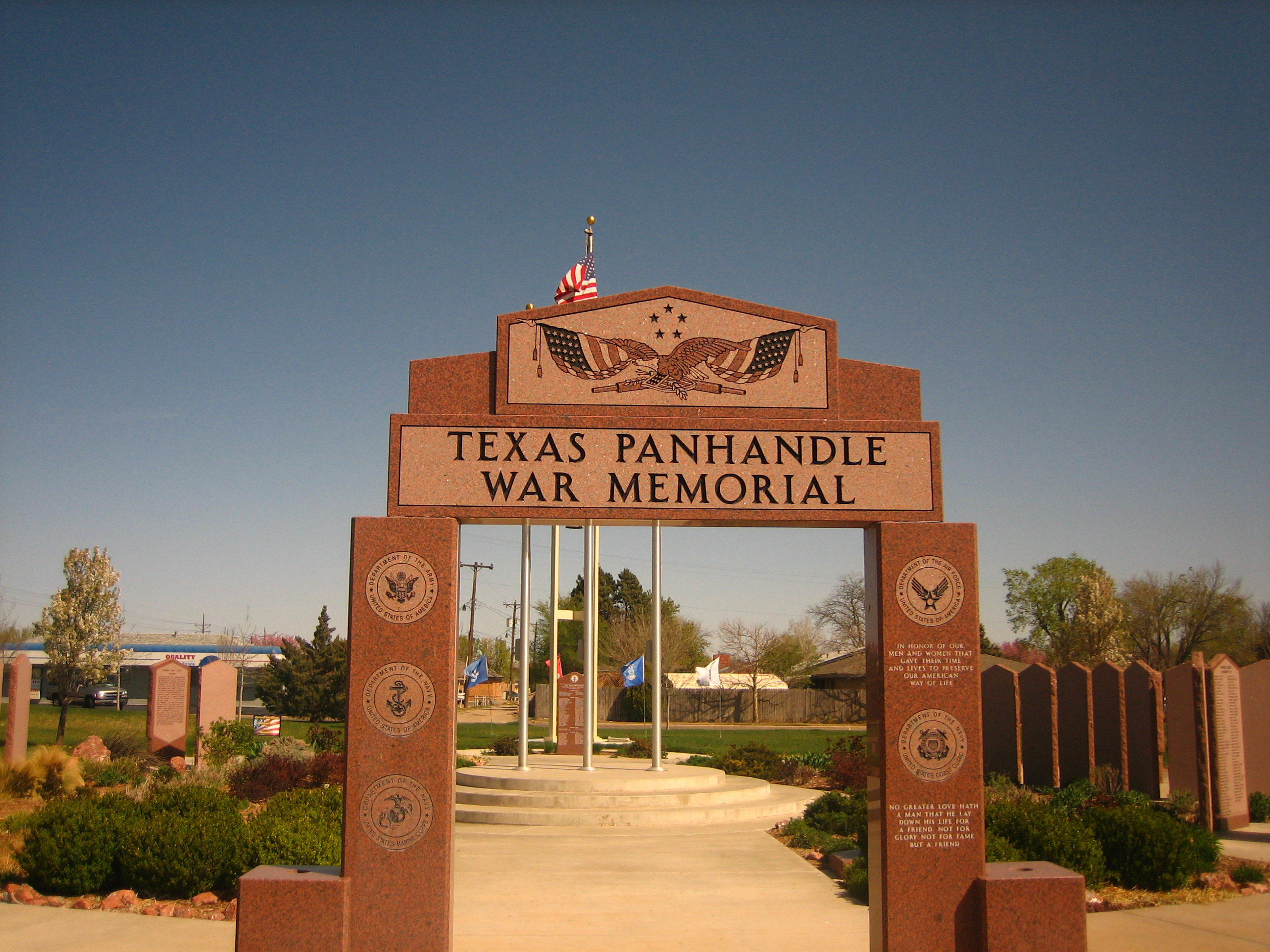
Entrance to Texas Panhandle War Memorial in Amarillo

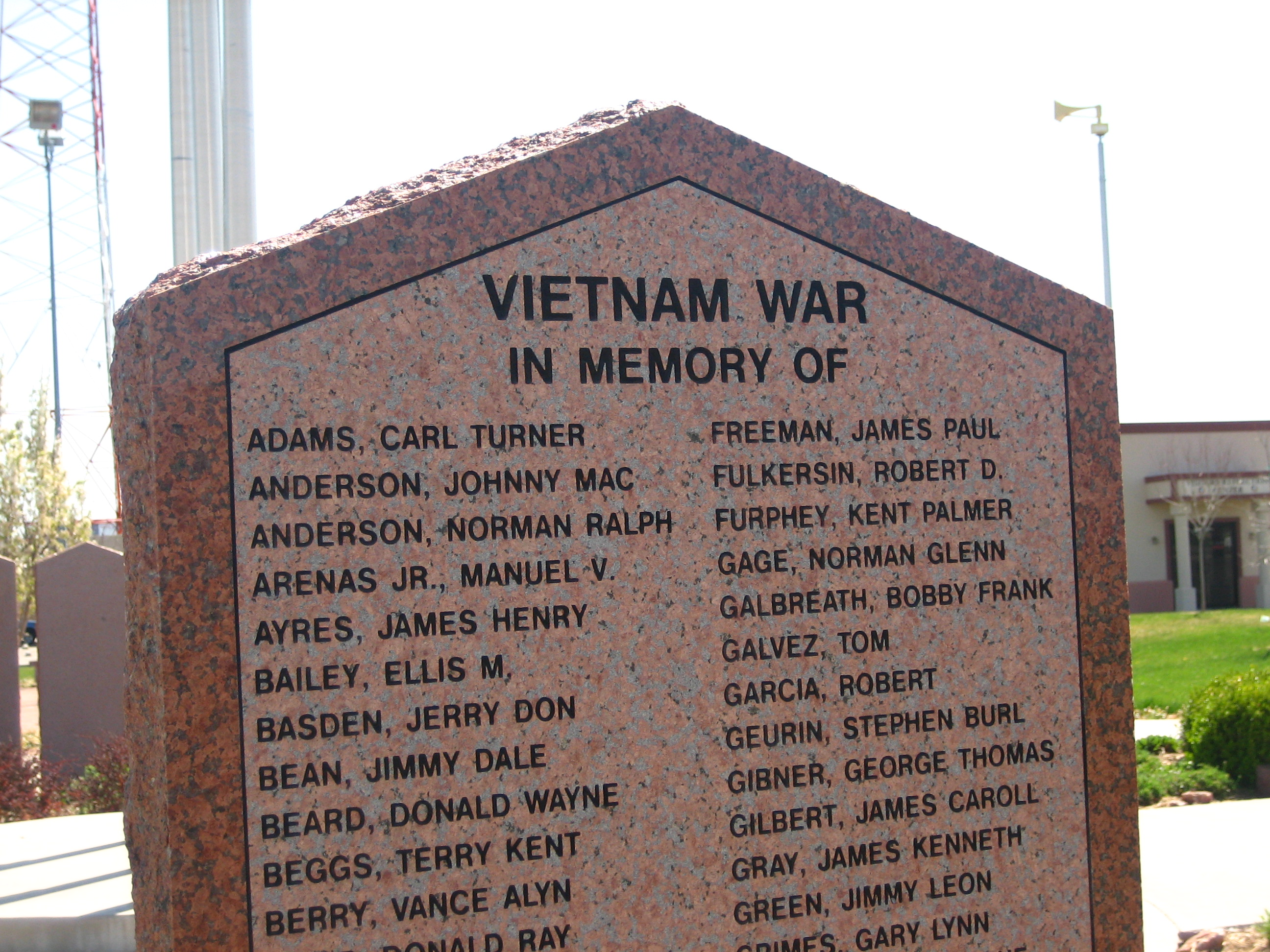
Listing of Amarillo-area personnel killed in the Vietnam War

Several natural attractions are near the city. The Palo Duro Canyon State Park is the United States' second largest canyon system, after the Grand Canyon and is located south of Amarillo. The canyon is a prominent mountain biking destination and hosts the annual 50-mile Palo Duro Canyon Trail Run. Palo Duro has a distinct hoodoo that resembles a lighthouse. Another natural landmark near the city, the Alibates Flint Quarries National Monument is located 30 miles (48 km) north of Amarillo. It had been the site for prehistoric inhabitants to obtain flint in order to make tools and weapons. About 100 miles (160 km) southeast of Amarillo in Briscoe County is Caprock Canyons State Park and Trailway, the state park is the home of the official Texas State Bison Herd captured and taken care of by cattle rancher Charles Goodnight.

Local millionaire Stanley Marsh 3 funded many public art projects in the city including the Cadillac Ranch, located west of Amarillo on Interstate 40, a monument of painted Cadillac automobiles that were dug into the ground head first. Marsh also participated in an ongoing art project called the Dynamite Museum, which consists of thousands of mock traffic signs. These signs, bearing messages such as "Road does not end" or displaying a random picture, are scattered throughout the city of Amarillo. Besides these works, close to the city is the final earthwork of Robert Smithson (and another commission by Marsh), Amarillo Ramp.

The city has events and attractions honoring the cowboy and Texas culture. During the third week of September, the Tri-State Fair & Rodeo brings participants mostly from Oklahoma, New Mexico and Texas to Amarillo since 1921. On the Tri-State Exposition grounds, the Amarillo National Center is a special events center for events ranging from national equestrian competitions to motor sports and rodeos. The World Championship Ranch Rodeo sponsored by the Working Ranch Cowboys Association is held every November in the Amarillo Civic Center. The Amarillo Livestock Auction on Bull Road holds a free-to-the-public cattle auction on Tuesdays. Now located on Interstate 40, The Big Texan Steak Ranch is famous by offering visitors a free 72 ounce (2 kg) beef steak if it (and its accompanying dinner) is eaten in under an hour.

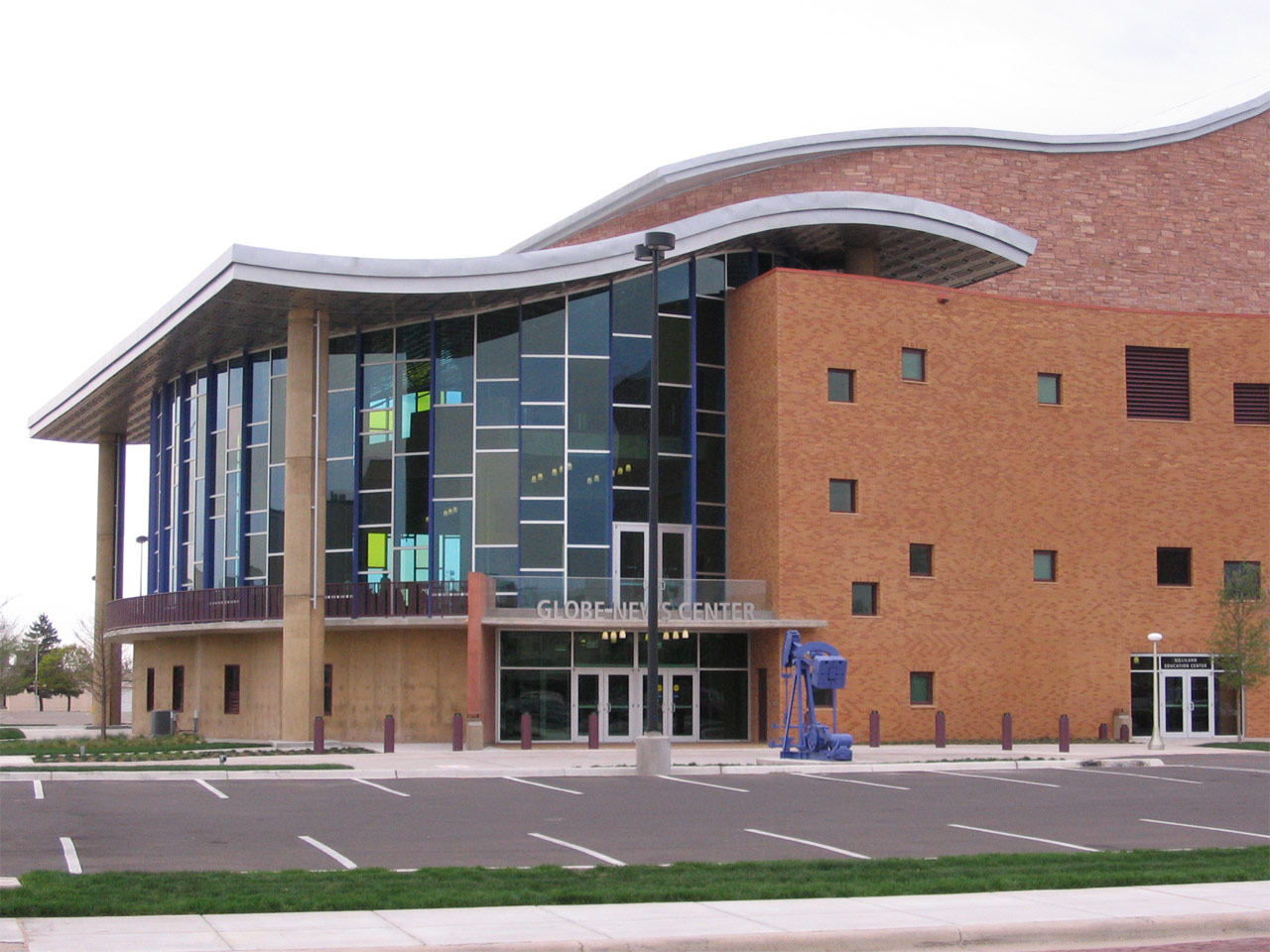
The Globe-News Center for the Performing Arts building is located near the Amarillo Civic Center.

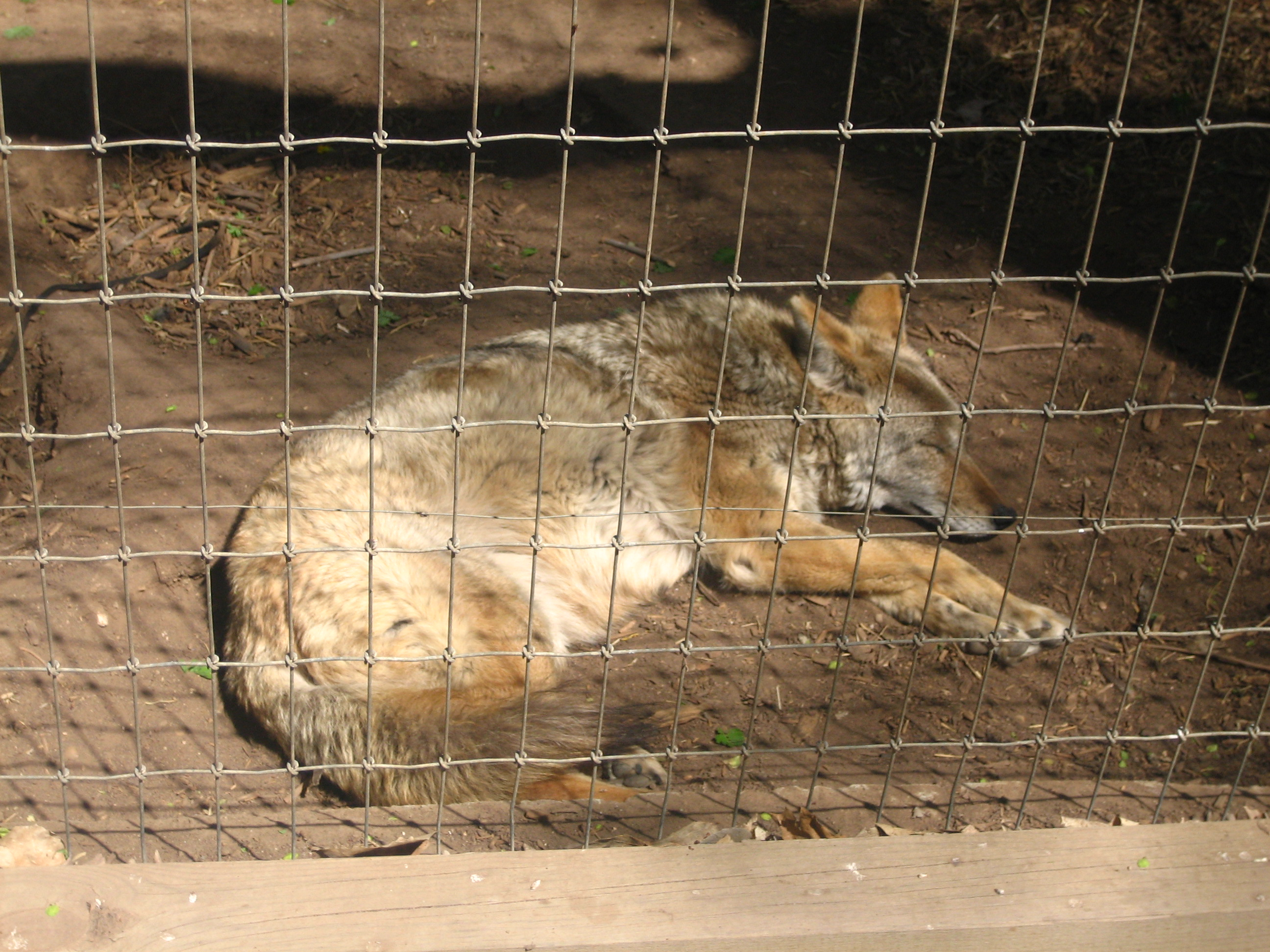
A coyote sleeps in the afternoon heat in the Amarillo Zoo.

Globe-News Center for the Performing Arts, opened in 2006, houses the Amarillo Opera, Amarillo Symphony, and Lone Star Ballet concerts. The facility, located just across the Amarillo Civic Center, features a 1,300-seat auditorium. The Globe-News Center was built in hope by city officials and others that it would revitalize the downtown area. The nonprofit community theater group, Amarillo Little Theatre, has its season run from September to May. The theater group's two facilities, the Mainstage and the Adventure Space, are located west of Amarillo's downtown. The Pioneer Amphitheater, located in nearby Palo Duro Canyon, is the setting for the outdoor musical drama Texas, which plays nightly during the summer. The musical depicts a story about the history of Texas Panhandle settlers throughout the years. In 2002, the producers changed its name to Texas Legacies after retiring the previous script that was used for 37 years for a more historically accurate one, but attendance declined over the next four seasons, so it was decided to revert to the original Paul Green script in 2006.

The Amarillo Public Library is affiliated with the Harrington Library Consortium. The consortium consists of public, college, and school libraries located in the Texas Panhandle that share resources and cooperate with one another. Other members include Amarillo's public schools, Amarillo College, Canyon Area Library, Lovett Memorial Library in Pampa, Texas, and Hutchinson County Library in Borger, Texas. The Amarillo Public Library's main branch is located in downtown and operates four neighborhood branches.

Wonderland Amusement Park is located in northern Amarillo at Thompson Park, named for Ernest O. Thompson. The park also houses the Amarillo zoo and offers picnicking.

Amarillo residents are known as Amarilloans. Notable Amarilloans include actress Ann Doran (1911–2000), journalist Bascom N. Timmons, the Dory Funk wrestling family, former UFC Champions Heath Herring and Evan Tanner, astronaut Rick Husband, professional golfer Ryan Palmer, rockabilly pioneer Buddy Knox, actress Carolyn Jones, actress and dancer Cyd Charisse, actor and poet Harry Northup, State Senator Max Sherman, Republican state chairman Tom Mechler, politicians Beau Boulter and John Marvin Jones, businessman T. Boone Pickens, Jr., singer-songwriter JD Souther, gambler Thomas "Amarillo Slim" Preston, soldier and interior decorator Clyde Kenneth Harris, and music artist and composer Terry Stafford ("Amarillo by Morning"; "Suspicion"). Singer Lacey Brown of Amarillo advanced to the top 24 in season 8 on the hit show American Idol. She returned to the show again in season 9 and advanced to the top 12 but was eliminated from the program on March 17, 2010. Former residents Evander "Ziggy" Hood and Montrel Meander are in the National Football League.

=== Museums and art collections ===
The American Quarter Horse Association (AQHA) is an international organization dedicated to the preservation, improvement and record-keeping of the American Quarter Horse breed. The organization is headquartered in Amarillo and has a museum. There is also an American Quarter Horse Hall of Fame exhibited in the museum. In addition, the AQHA and Center City of Amarillo co-sponsor the project, "Hoof Prints of the American Quarter Horse" consisting of horse statues located in front of several Amarillo businesses, such as the downtown Amarillo National building, Nationwide Insurance, and Edward Jones. An area business would purchase a horse statue for a local artist to paint.

Two of the Amarillo area's higher education institutions have at least one museum in their campuses. The Amarillo Art Center, opened in 1972, is a building complex with the Amarillo Museum of Art (AMoA) and concert hall located on the Washington Street Campus of Amarillo College. Located on the campus of West Texas A&M University, the Panhandle-Plains Historical Museum claims to be the largest historical museum in Texas.

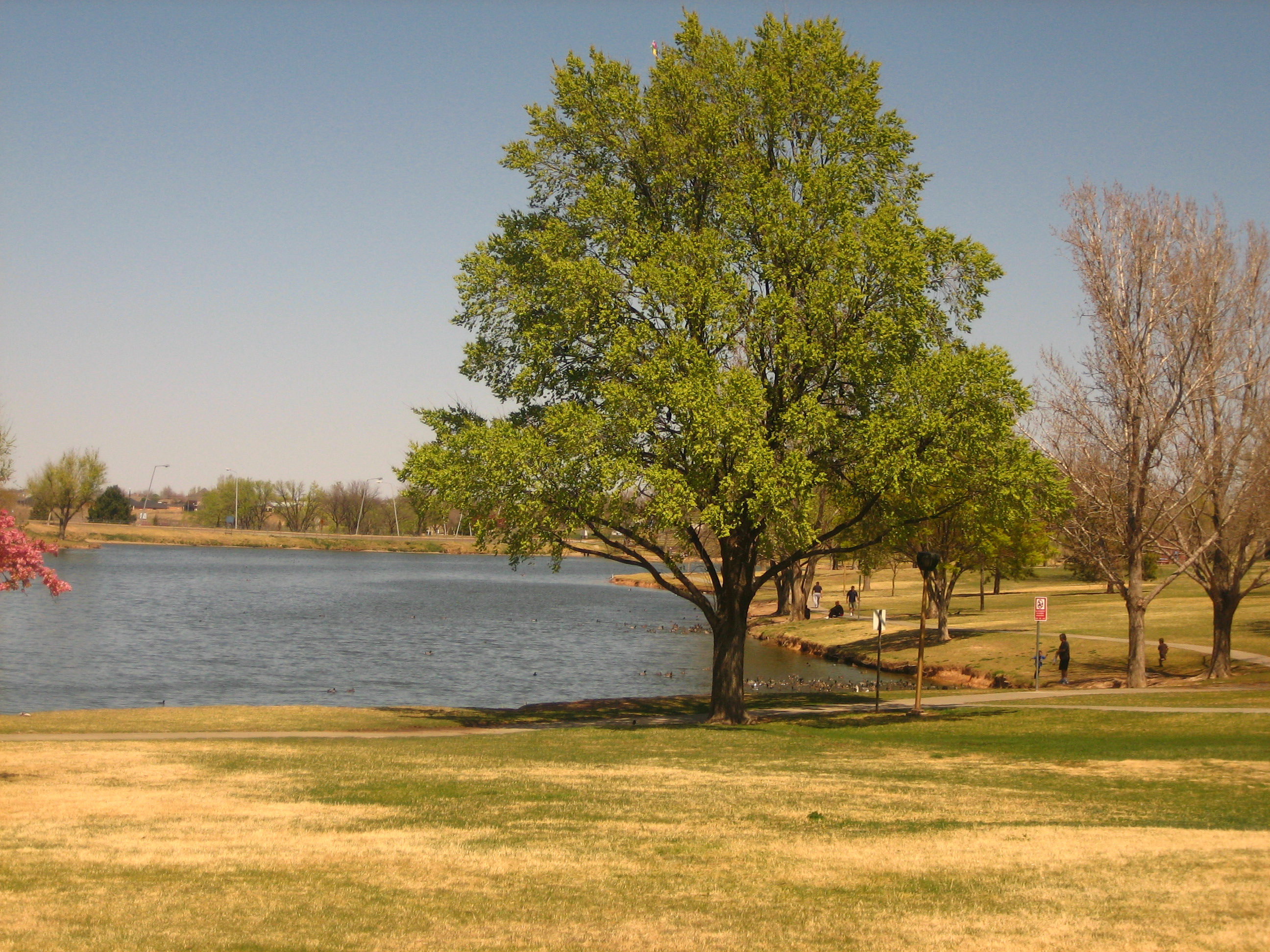
Medical Center Park, adjacent to Amarillo Botanical Gardens

Don Harrington Discovery Center, located in the city's hospital district, is an interactive science center and space theater with over 60 hands-on exhibits. Outside of the building is a steel structure called the Helium Monument which has time capsules and designates Amarillo the "Helium Capital of the World". Near the proximity of the Discovery Center, the Amarillo Botanical Gardens has gardens, indoor exhibits, and a library for visitation throughout the year.

The Texas Pharmacy Museum claims to be the only Texas museum specialized in the research, collection, preservation, and exhibition of the history of pharmacy, is also located in the city's hospital district.

Founded in 2013 by businessman Tom Warren, the Amarillo Historical Museum is Amarillo's only local museum exclusively featuring local history.

Other notable museums in the area are the Kwahadi Kiva Indian Museum and the English Field Air & Space Museum. The Kwahadi Kiva Indian Museum features a collection of Native American artifacts and provides dance performances. The English Field Air & Space Museum, which had been operated by the Texas Aviation Historical Society and featured aircraft and space exhibits, closed its doors in 2007; subsequently, the museum lost many of its aircraft. The museum, now rebuilding its collection as Texas Air & Space Museum, is located on American Drive on the south side of the airport.

=== Cityscape ===
Most of Amarillo's population growth and commercial development is occurring in the southern and northwestern parts of the city. Similar to many towns in the Texas Panhandle, the city's downtown has suffered economic deterioration throughout the years. To help revitalize it, the Center City of Amarillo organization was formed to establish partnerships with groups that have a large presence in the city. Since its conception in the 1990s, Center City has sponsored public art projects and started block parties in the downtown area.

The 31-story FirstBank Southwest Tower was opened in Amarillo's downtown in 1971. Completed in the same year as the FirstBank Southwest Tower, the Amarillo National Bank Plaza One building houses the headquarters of Amarillo National Bank, the city's largest financial institution. The Santa Fe Building, completed in 1930 as the regional office of the Atchison, Topeka and Santa Fe Railway, was vacant for several years until 1995 when Potter County bought it for $426,000 to gain new office spaces.

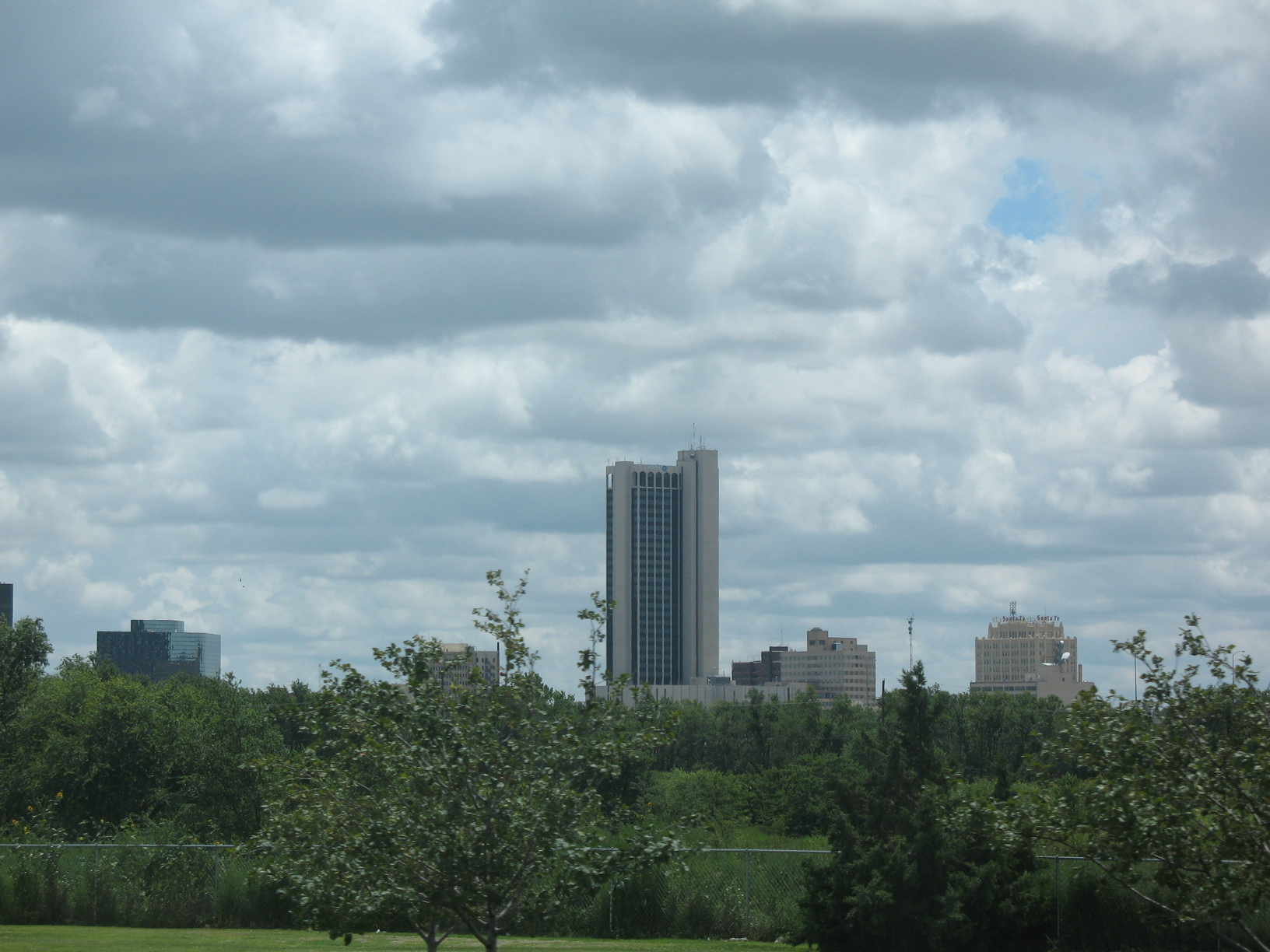
FirstBank Southwest Tower, the tallest building in the city, dominates the skyline of downtown Amarillo.

Amarillo's historic homes and buildings listed on the National Register of Historic Places reflect the economic growth from around 1900 to the start of World War II. Polk Street contains many of the city's historic downtown buildings and homes. The large historic homes on this street were built close to downtown, and homes were located on the west side of the street as a symbol of status because they would be greeted with the sunrise every morning.

The city of Amarillo's Parks and Recreation Department operates over 50 municipal parks, including a skatepark west of the city. Amarillo's largest parks are Medical Park, Thompson Memorial Park, and Memorial Park, near Amarillo College's Washington Street Campus. From 1978 to 2002, the Junior League of Amarillo and the city of Amarillo's Parks and Recreation Department co-sponsored Funfest, a family entertainment festival, benefiting the city parks and the league's Community Chest Trust Fund. Funfest was held in Thompson Memorial Park during Memorial Day weekend.

==== Tallest buildings ====
Rank	Name	Image	Height ft (m)	Floors	Year	Coordinates	Notes
1	FirstBank Southwest Tower		374 (114)	31	1971	35°12′26.54″N 101°50′19.67″W	
2	Amarillo National Bank		220 (67)	16	1971	35°12′32.46″N 101°50′9.13″W	
3	Santa Fe Building		188 (57)	13	1930	35°12′15.91″N 101°50′17.02″W	
4	Herring Hotel		164 (50)	13	1926		
5	Fisk Medical Arts Building		152 (46)	12	1927 or 1928		

== Sports ==
The National Arena League team Amarillo Warbirds, the Major League Indoor Soccer team the Amarillo Bombers and the NAHL Jr. A hockey team, the Amarillo Wranglers all play in the Amarillo Civic Center. Amarillo previously hosted an independent league baseball team, the Amarillo Thunderheads of the American Association, which played its home games in Potter County Memorial Stadium from 2011 to 2015. The city was the home of the Double-A Amarillo Gold Sox Minor League Baseball team of the Texas League various years between 1939 and 1982. In 2019, the Texas League's San Antonio Missions relocated to Amarillo as the Amarillo Sod Poodles and play at the $45.5 million Hodgetown. Amarillo formerly had a minor league indoor soccer team called the Amarillo Challengers that competed in the SISL and later the USISL.

West Texas A&M University, in nearby Canyon plays in NCAA Division II; Amarillo College is a junior college that plays in Division 2 of the NJCAA. From 1968 to 1996, Amarillo hosted the annual National Women's Invitational Tournament (NWIT), a post-season women's college basketball tournament. During high school football season, the Amarillo Independent School District schools' home games are in Dick Bivins Stadium which had a $5,700,000 renovation in 2005. Randall High School (part of the adjacent Canyon Independent School District) plays its home games in Kimbrough Memorial Stadium in Canyon, which also hosts the yearly Clinton Invitational horseshoe tournament. River Road, Highland Park, and Bushland High Schools also play football and other sports.

Another part of Amarillo's sporting history was its roots in professional wrestling. Amarillo residents Dory Funk, Stanley Blackburn and Doc Sarpolis promoted the territory for several decades. Funk's sons, Dory Funk, Jr. and Terry Funk, were National Wrestling Alliance World Heavyweight Champions representing Amarillo.

Starting in the spring of 2026, indoor football will return to Amarillo with the Amarillo Warbirds.

== Government ==
=== Local government ===
In 1913, Amarillo became the first Texas city and the fifth in United States to use the council-manager form of municipal government, with all governmental powers resting in a legislative body, called a council (before 2014, it was called a commission). Five elected commissioners, one of whom is the mayor, comprise the council. All serve a two-year term. The commission's role is to pass ordinances and resolutions, adopt regulations, and appoint city officials including the city manager. Although the mayor serves as a presiding officer of the commission, the city manager is the administrative head of the municipal government and is responsible for the administration of all departments. The city commission meets on Tuesday of each week. The mayor is Cole Stanley, and the city manager is Jared Miller.

List of mayors of Amarillo, Texas
- Warren W. Wetsel, 1892–1894
- R. L. Stringfellow, 1899–1902
- S. Lightburne, 1902–1906
- Will A. Miller, Jr., 1906–1908
- Lon D. Marrs, 1908–1910 and 1917–1922
- James N. Patton, 1910–1912
- W. E. Gee, 1912–1913
- J. N. Beasley, 1913–1916
- Eugene S. Blasdel, 1923–1924
- Lee Bivins, 1925–1928
- Ernest O. Thompson, 1929–1932
- Ross D. Rogers, 1932–1941
- Joe A. Jenkins, 1941–1947
- L. R. Hagy, 1947–1949
- E. H. Klein, 1949–1953
- S. T. Curtis, 1953–1955
- R. C. Jordan, 1955–1957
- J. R. Armstrong, 1957–1959
- A. F. Madison, 1959–1961
- Jack Seale, 1961–1963
- F. V. Wallace, 1963–1967
- J. Ernest Stroud, 1967–1971
- L. Ray Vahue, 1971–1975
- John C. Drummond, 1975–1977
- Jerry H. Hodge, 1977–1981
- R. P. (Rick) Klein, 1981–1987
- Glen Parkey, 1987–1989
- Keith Adams, 1989–1993
- Kel Seliger, 1993–2001
- Trent Sisemore, 2001–2005
- Debra McCartt, 2005–2011
- Paul Harpole, 2011–2017
- Ginger Nelson, 2017–2023
- Cole Stanley, 2023–Present

=== County, state, and federal representation ===
As the seat of Potter County, the city is the location of the county's trial, civil, and criminal courts. The Randall County Amarillo Annex building is located within the city limits and houses its Sheriff's Office and Justice of the Peace Court, Precinct 4.

The Texas Seventh Court of Appeals is located in Amarillo.

The Texas Department of Criminal Justice operates the Amarillo District Parole Office in the city. It also operates the Clements Unit and Nathaniel J. Neal Unit in unincorporated Potter County, east of Amarillo.

The United States Postal Service operates the Amarillo Main Post Office. Other post offices in the city include Downtown Amarillo, Jordan, Lone Star, North Amarillo, and San Jacinto.

In the U.S. House, Amarillo is located in Texas's 13th congressional district, and is represented by Representative Ronny Jackson. In the Texas Legislature, the city is in the 31st District in the Texas Senate, represented by Republican Kevin Sparks, of Midland. It is in the 87th District in the Texas House of Representatives, represented by Republican Caroline Fairly. The sliver of Amarillo within Randall County is represented by Price's Republican colleague, John T. Smithee, who has served in the 86th District since 1985.

== Education ==
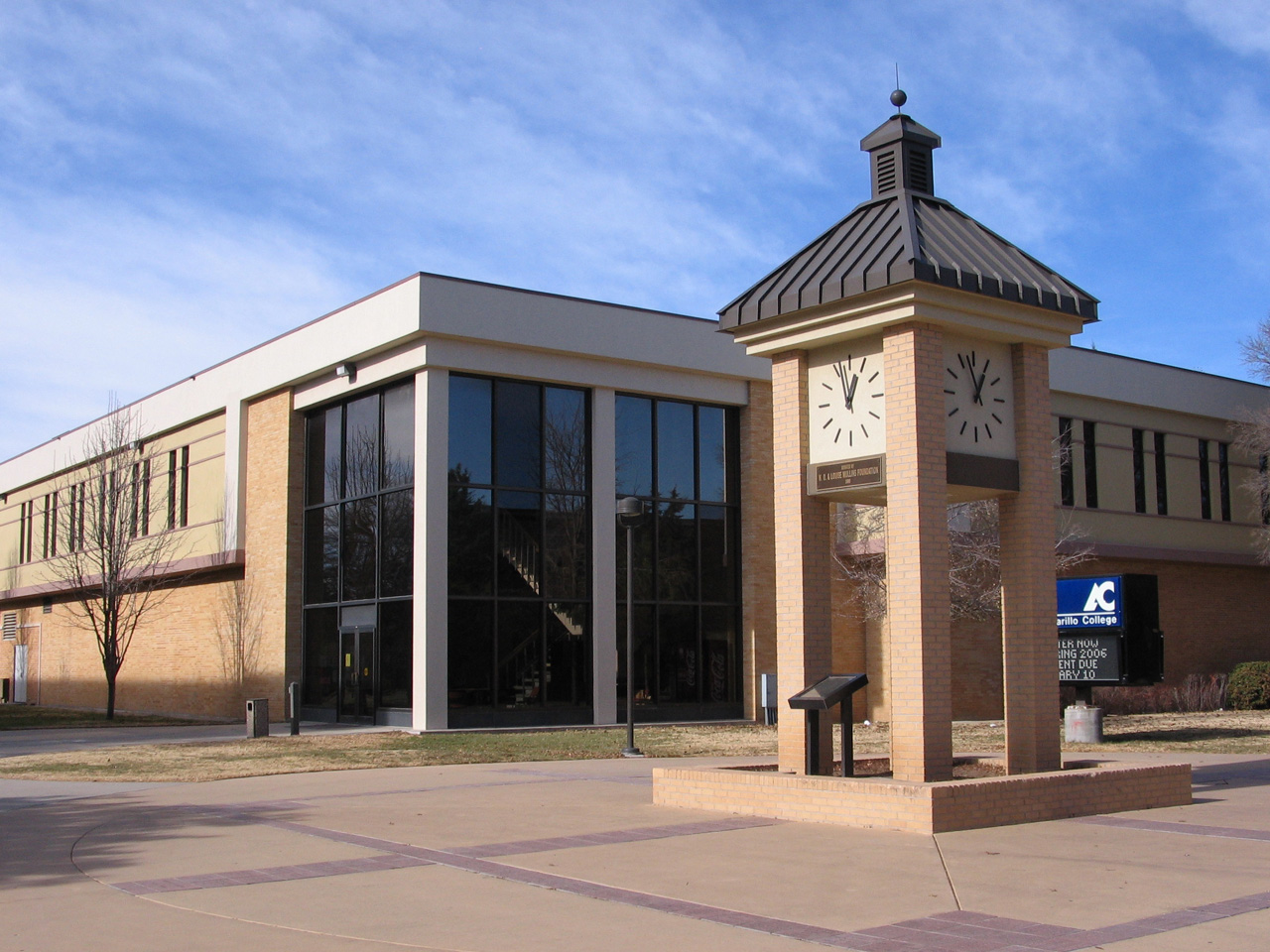
The clock tower at Amarillo College's Washington Street Campus

According to the U.S. Census Bureau, 23.3% of all adults aged 25 and older have obtained a bachelor's degree, and 85% a high school diploma or equivalent.

The higher-education institutions in the city are Amarillo College, a two-year community college with over 10,000 students; Wayland Baptist University, a private university based in Plainview with a branch campus in Amarillo; Texas Tech University Health Sciences Center at Amarillo including the Jerry H. Hodge School of Pharmacy, Texas Tech University Health Sciences Center at Amarillo School of Medicine and School of Health Professions and Texas Tech University at Amarillo, a branch campus of Texas Tech University that offers selected master's degree programs. West Texas A&M University, a regional university headquartered in nearby Canyon, has a campus building in downtown Amarillo.

Amarillo's primary and secondary education is handled by five different school districts:

- Amarillo ISD
- Bushland ISD
- Canyon ISD
- Highland Park ISD
- River Road ISD

== Media ==
The major local newspaper is the Amarillo Globe-News, owned by GateHouse Media. It is a combination of three newspapers: Amarillo Daily News, Amarillo Globe, and Amarillo Times. Other publications include a local monthly magazine, Accent West, dealing with city and regional issues in the Amarillo area, and a daily online paper, The Amarillo Pioneer. The American Quarter Horse Association publishes two monthly publications, The American Quarter Horse Journal and The American Quarter Horse Racing Journal. HISPANIC Newspaper El Mensajero owned by Dr. Ramon Godoy started printing in 1989.

Amarillo's major network television affiliates are KACV-TV 2 (PBS), KAMR 4 (NBC), KVII 7 (ABC, with The CW on DT2), KFDA 10 (CBS), KCIT 14 (Fox), KEYU 31 (Telemundo) and KCPN-LD 33 (MyNet). In the 2024–2025 television season, Amarillo was the 131st largest television market in the United States designated by Nielsen Media Research.

Amarillo is the 168th largest United States radio market in autumn 2005 designated by the radio audience research company, Arbitron. Arbitron rated the five highest-rated commercial radio stations in Fall 2012/Spring 2013 as:

1. KXGL-FM − 100.9 FM- Classic Hits
2. KGNC-FM − 97.9 FM- Country
3. KGNC − 710 AM- News/Talk/Sports
4. KXSS-FM − 96.9 FM- Top 40/CHR
5. KQIZ-FM − 93.1 FM- Rhythmic Top 40/CHR

The regional public radio network, High Plains Public Radio, operates KJJP-FM 105.7. Other notable radio stations around the area include the college stations KACV-FM 89.9 (Amarillo College), Active Rock KZRK-FM (107.9), and KWTS-FM 91.1 (West Texas A&M University) in nearby Canyon.

== Infrastructure ==
=== Air transportation ===
Rick Husband Amarillo International Airport is a public airport located 10 miles (16 km) east of the central business district of Amarillo, north of Interstate 40. A portion of the former Amarillo Air Force Base was converted to civilian use and became part of the airport. The airport was renamed in 2003 for NASA astronaut Rick Husband, an Amarillo native and commander of the final flight of Space Shuttle Columbia, STS-107, which disintegrated on re-entry killing Husband and his crewmates. Several major air carriers offer non-stop service to Dallas/Fort Worth, Houston, Austin, Denver, Phoenix and Las Vegas.

Tradewind Airport is a public-use general aviation airport located in Randall County, 3 nautical miles (3.5 mi; 5.6 km) south of Amarillo's central business district. The airport covers 595 acres (241 ha) and has two asphalt-paved runways and one helipad.

Buffalo Airport is a public-use general aviation airport located in Randall County, 9 nautical miles (10 mi; 17 km) south of Amarillo's central business district. The airport covers 40 acres (16 ha) and has two grass runways.

=== Ground transportation ===
Local transit services in the city have been available since 1925 and have been provided through the City of Amarillo's Amarillo City Transit (ACT) department since 1966; before that time the system was privately owned. ACT operates bus services that include fixed route transit and demand response paratransit which are designed for people with disabilities. Each year ACT transports approximately 350,000 passengers on the fixed route and 30,000 paratransit passengers.

Amarillo has no passenger rail service but remains an important part of the rail freight system. The last passenger train out of the city was the Santa Fe Railroad's San Francisco Chief, from Chicago, in 1971. The Texas Zephyr between Denver and Dallas last served Amarillo in 1967. The BNSF Railway complex in Amarillo continues to serve a heavy daily traffic load, approximately 100–110 trains per day. The Union Pacific Railroad also sends substantial shipments to or through Amarillo. In addition to intermodal and general goods, a big portion of rail shipments are of grains and coal. There have been various proposals over the years to add passenger service. One, the Caprock Chief, would have seen daily service as part of a Fort Worth, Texas—Denver, Colorado service, but it failed to gain traction.

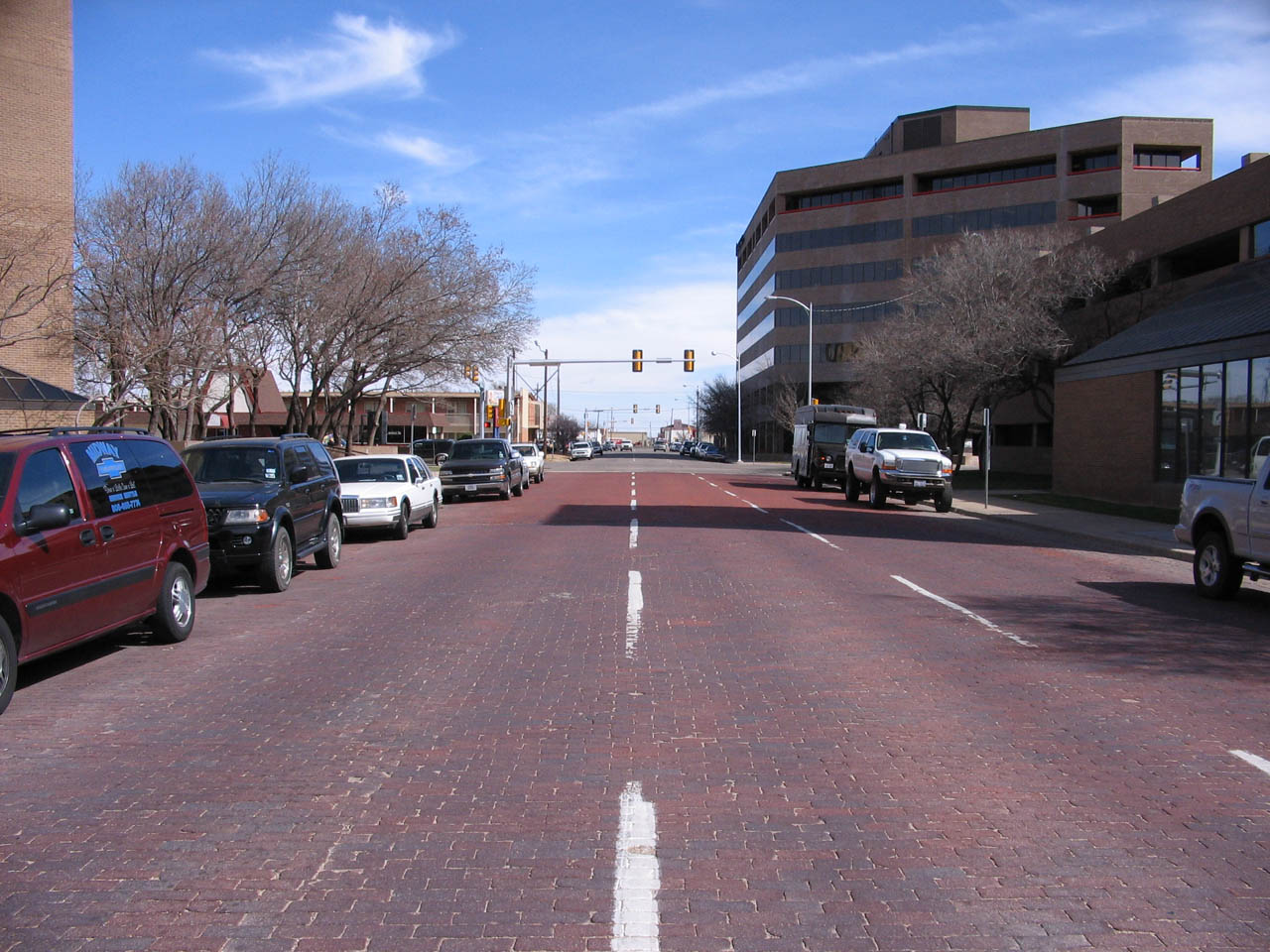
Several streets around Amarillo's downtown area are still paved with bricks.

The streets in Amarillo's downtown area conform to a grid pattern. The city's original street layout was set up by William H. Bush. Beginning at the west end of the town moving to the east, Bush named the north to south streets for past United States presidents, in chronological order except for John Quincy Adams because the surname had been taken by the second president, John Adams. The last president so honored was Grover Cleveland; as the city expanded eastward the pattern was not continued.

While the streets running north–south are designated 'streets', east–west streets are numbered and are designated 'avenues'. North of the Fort Worth & Denver (now BNSF) railyard, the numbers are "NW" (northwest) west of Polk Street and "NE" (northeast) east of Polk. South of the railyard (including the downtown-city center area), numbers are officially "SW" (southwest) west of Polk, and "SE" (southeast) east of Polk. Colloquially, though, most tend to dub the SW and SE avenues as W (west) and E (east), respectively. One example of the numbering difference is the former U.S. Highway 66 routing west of downtown and into the San Jacinto neighborhood. Most call it 'West Sixth Street' instead of SW Sixth Avenue.

In 1910, the Amarillo voters had approved to pay for street paving with bricks. As of 2003, the city still has 16.2 miles (26.1 km) of brick streets in some parts of the downtown area. In 2002, the city spent $200,000 to restore one block of brick street on Ninth Avenue between Polk and Tyler streets.

=== Major highways ===
Amarillo is served by two interstate highways: Interstate 27 and Interstate 40. Amarillo is also the northern terminus for I-27, of which less than one mile (~1.6 km) is located in Potter County. The highway terminates at the city's main west–east highway, Interstate 40, just north of the Potter–Randall county line. The roadway continues northward into downtown Amarillo via U.S. 60, 87, and 287, via a series of four one-way streets including Buchanan, Pierce, Fillmore and Taylor. North of downtown the highway becomes US 87 & 287 and continues northward to Dumas.

Interstate 40, the city's major east–west thoroughfare, was completed entirely through Amarillo in November 1968 across the center of the city despite local opposition. Loop 335 is a beltway that circles around Amarillo in all four directions and consists of four-lane roadway on its northeast and southwest quadrants and a two-lane highway to the southeast and northwest. Plans to convert the entire beltway into a freeway were published by the Texas Department of Transportation in 2015. The Ports-to-Plains Corridor passes through Amarillo as part of Interstate 27, which is planned to be extended north from its current terminus to Raton, New Mexico.

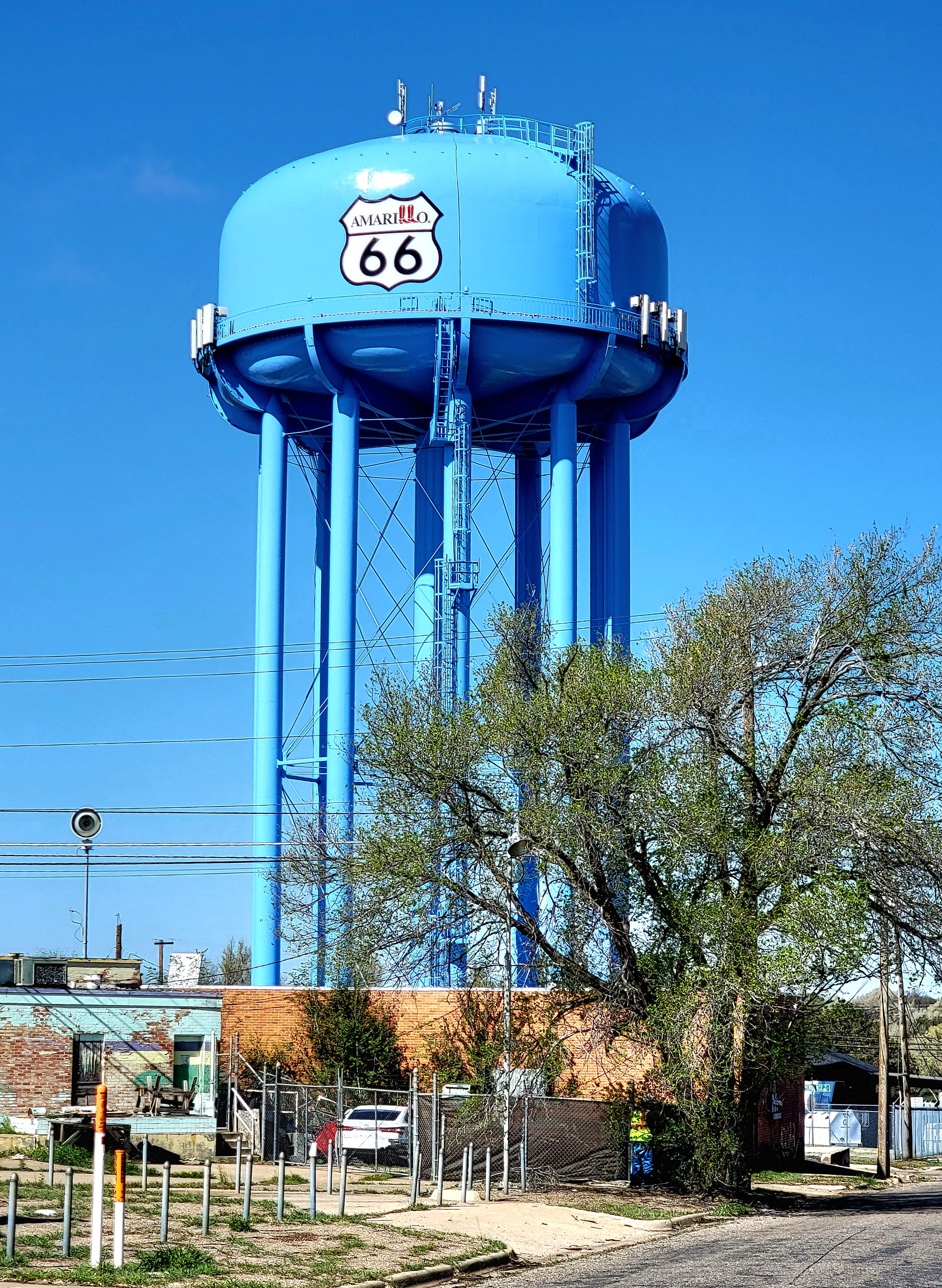
Route 66 commemorative water tower in Amarillo, Texas

Previously, U.S. Route 66 had been the city's major east–west highway, generally following Amarillo Boulevard to the north of the downtown area and then curving southwest to leave the city near the Veterans Hospital. The highway's original alignment through Amarillo was later designated as a city route. Amarillo is also mentioned in the song "(Get Your Kicks on) Route 66".

=== Medical centers and hospitals ===
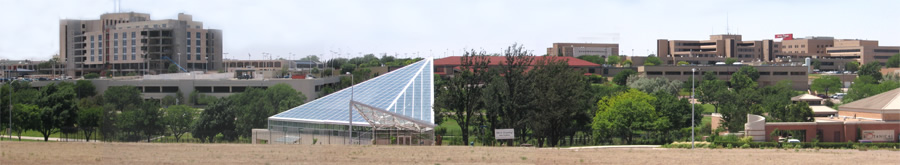
The Harrington Regional Medical Center has two of the city's major hospitals.

Amarillo is home to medical facilities including Baptist St. Anthony's and Northwest Texas Hospitals, the Don & Sybil Harrington Cancer Center, Bivins Memorial Nursing Home, Texas Tech University Health Sciences Center, Texas Tech School of Pharmacy, and Texas Panhandle Mental Health and Mental Retardation. All are located in the Harrington Regional Medical Center, the first specifically designated city hospital district in Texas.

Baptist St. Anthony's, known locally as BSA, had some of its services listed on the U.S. News & World Report's "Top 50 Hospitals" from 2002 to 2005. BSA was a result of a 1996 merger between the Texas Panhandle's first hospital, St Anthony's, with High Plains Baptist Hospital. The BSA Hospice & Life Enrichment Center provides important services to the Amarillo area. The BSA facility, opened in 1985, was the first free-standing hospice west of the Mississippi River to be built and opened without debt.

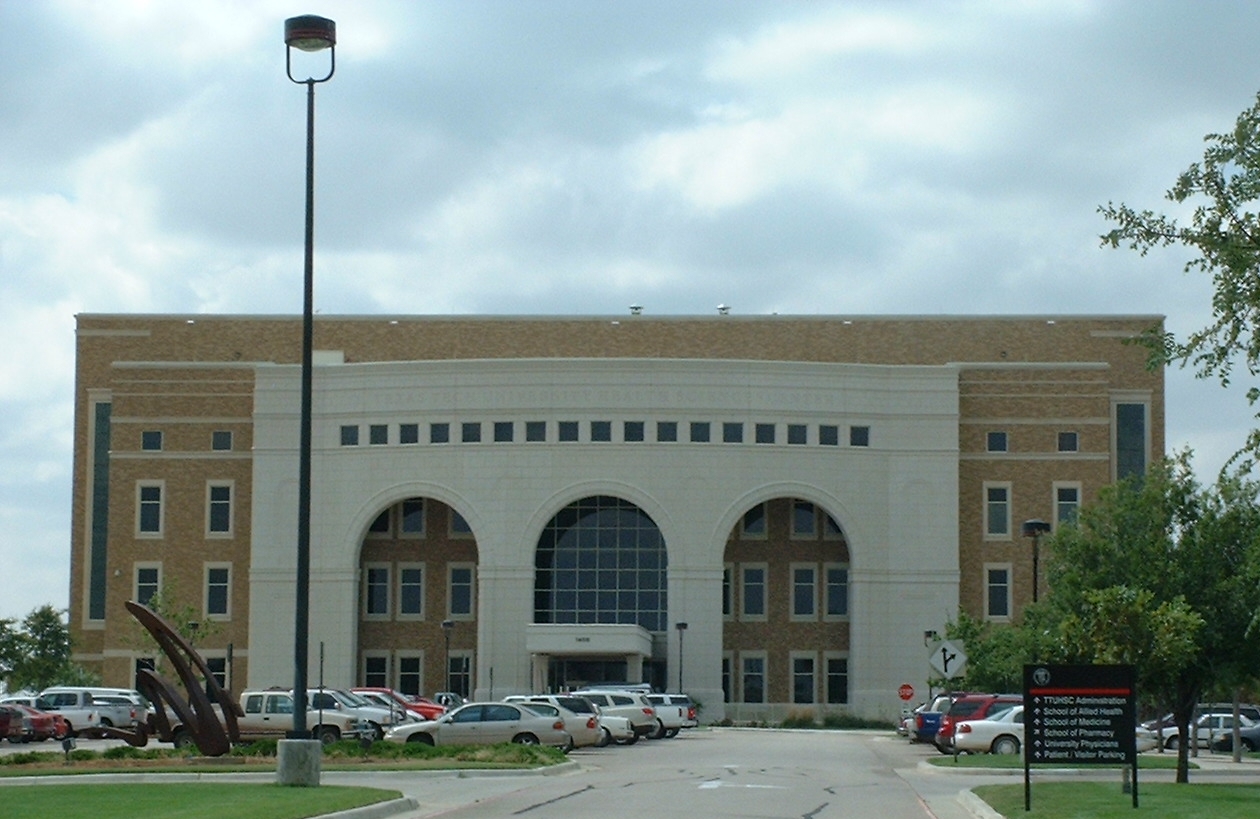
Texas Tech University Health Sciences Center

Northwest Texas Hospital is home to the area's only Level III designated trauma center.

The Thomas E. Creek Department of Veterans Affairs Medical Center is located east of Harrington Regional Medical Center. The facility opened in 1940 and was renamed in 2005, honoring the 18-year-old Amarillo Marine who had been posthumously awarded the Medal of Honor. Construction began in 2006 for a new Texas State Veterans Home in northwest Amarillo. The United States government, through the Veterans Affairs Medical Center, provided the funding to build the facility; the Texas government will run it after construction is completed. The Ussery-Roan Texas State Veterans Home opened in 2007.

=== Utilities ===
Drinking water is provided by the City of Amarillo and its Utilities Division. Amarillo's water supply used to come from both from Lake Meredith and the Ogallala Aquifer. Due to the lake's low water level, water is now only supplied by the aquifer. Lake Meredith is located northeast of Amarillo and in 2005 it contained at least 114 billion US gallons (430,000,000 m^{3}) of water. By 2011, lake levels had dropped so much due to the Texas drought that the Canadian River Municipal Water Authority voted to stop using it entirely. However, increased rainfall in recent years has helped the lake regain much of its volume. Generally, the city's daily water production averages between 40–50 million US gallons (150,000–190,000 m^{3}).

Collection and disposal of the city's trash and garbage are the responsibilities of the City of Amarillo's Solid Waste Collection and Solid Waste Disposal Departments. Amarillo's non-hazardous solid waste is collected for burial in the city's landfill. The City of Amarillo also operates recycling collection centers, one located near the downtown area and four at fire stations in the city. Other utilities are primarily provided by private organizations. Natural gas is distributed by Atmos Energy. Electric power service is distributed by Xcel Energy, through its wholly owned subsidiary, the Amarillo-based Southwestern Public Service Company. Wired telephone service is mainly provided by AT&T. Cable television is primarily provided by Suddenlink Communications.

== In popular culture ==
=== Outside media attention ===
The city gained national media attention in 1998 when local cattlemen unsuccessfully sued television talk show host Oprah Winfrey for comments made on her show connecting American beef to mad cow disease, costing them and their industry millions of dollars. In order to attend the trial in Amarillo, she temporarily relocated her show to the Amarillo Little Theatre for nearly a year. During the trial, Winfrey hired Dallas-based jury consultant Phil McGraw to aid her attorneys on selecting and analyzing the members of the jury. McGraw would later become a regular guest on Winfrey's television show and subsequently started his own talk show, Dr. Phil, in 2002.

Another notable trial in Amarillo was the Fort Worth-area murder case of T. Cullen Davis, which involved one of the richest men in the United States, his former wife, and her daughter and boyfriend. The trial was moved from Fort Worth to Amarillo in 1977 on a change of venue. The 1997 murder of Brian Deneke and subsequent trial also brought national attention because it highlighted social divisions in the community that mirrored those in America as a whole. The defendant in the trial was convicted of voluntary manslaughter and received a light sentence. The movie Bomb City is based on the events surrounding Deneke's murder.

The small town of Tulia, Texas, approximately 47 miles (76 km) south from Amarillo, was the scene of a controversial drug sting in 1999. Local civil rights attorney Jeff Blackburn took up the case of the Tulia defendants, which became a cause célèbre and resulted in the exoneration and pardon of the defendants. A federal lawsuit directed at the officials responsible for the sting operation was held in Amarillo. In the final settlement, the City of Amarillo agreed to pay $5 million in damages to the former Tulia defendants; disband the Panhandle Regional Narcotics Task Force that it set up to oversee the sting operation; and require early retirement for two Amarillo Police Department officers who were responsible for supervising the sting's sole undercover agent.

On May 5, 2020, Amarillo ranked 13th in the nation for Highest Average Daily Growth Rate of COVID-19 cases by the New York Times.

=== In music ===
Amarillo has been mentioned in popular music such as

- "Amarillo" (Gorillaz)
- "Amarillo by Morning" (notably covered by George Strait)
- "Amarillo Sky" (Jason Aldean)
- "Is This the Way to Amarillo" by Tony Christie
- "Amarillo", by Emmylou Harris, from her album Elite Hotel

=== In film and television ===
The Amarillo Film Commission is a division of the Amarillo Convention and Visitor Council that was created to provide film crews with locations and other assistance when filming in Amarillo. Amarillo was the setting for several motion pictures, including Indiana Jones and the Last Crusade, Switchback, and The Plutonium Circus, the 1995 South by Southwest Film Festival winner for best documentary feature. Amarillo also features heavily in the Better Call Saul episode of the same name, the third of the show's second season, in which protagonist Jimmy McGill visits the city to solicit clients.

== See also ==
- List of museums in the Texas Panhandle
- List of notable people from Amarillo, Texas
- Teel Bivins
- U.S. Route 66-Sixth Street Historic District
