= Amarillo Botanical Gardens =

Botanical gardens in Amarillo, TX

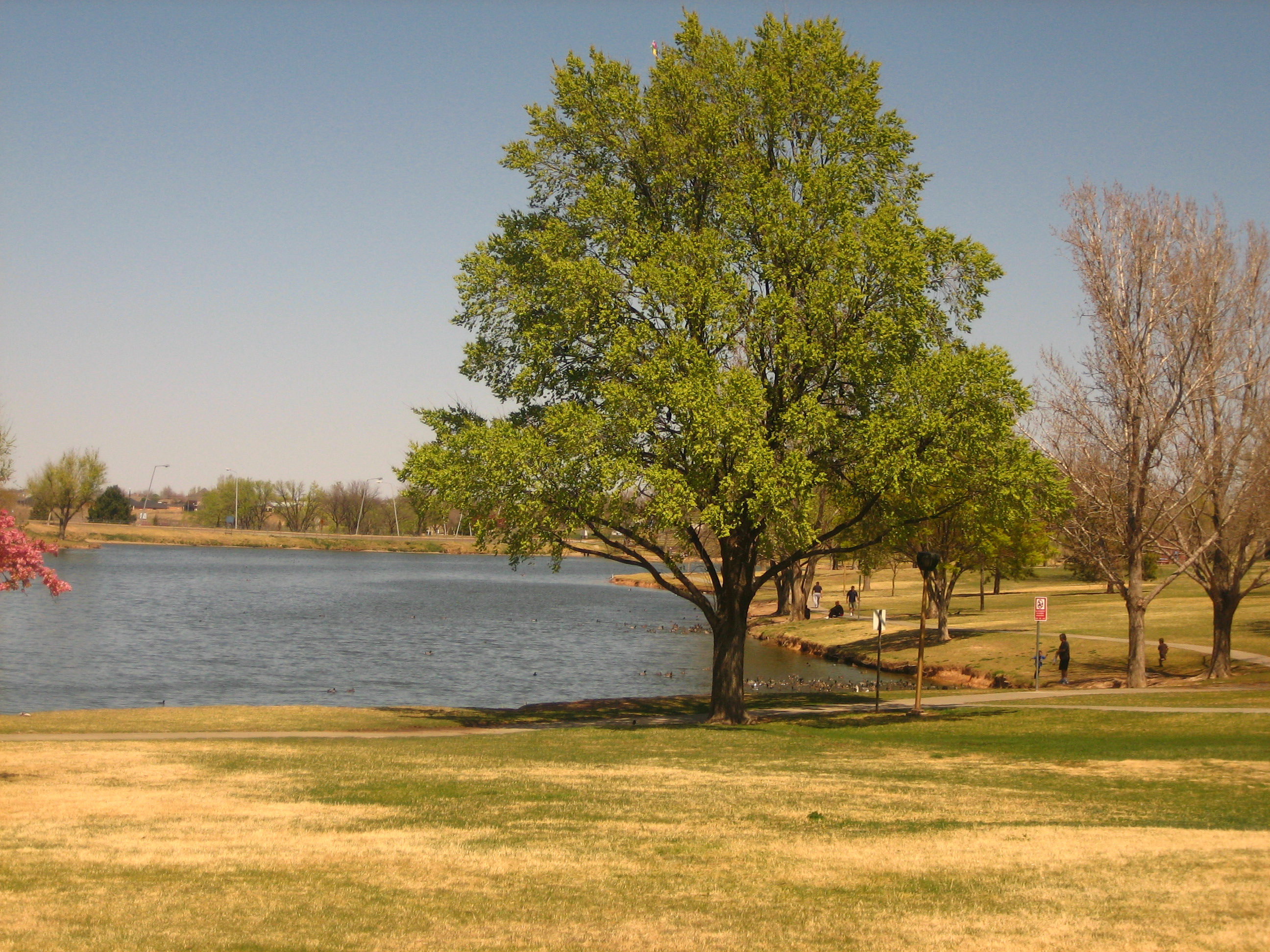
- Medical Center Park, adjacent to the Botanical Gardens

- Location within Texas
- Established: November 17, 1968
- Location: 1400 Streit Drive; Amarillo, Texas
- Coordinates: 35.1972°N 101.9149°W
- Type: Botanical garden
- Parking: On site
- Website: amarillobotanicalgardens.org

The Amarillo Botanical Gardens (4.4 acres) includes botanical gardens and Mary E. Bivins Tropical conservatory. The gardens are located in Medical Center Park at 1400 Streit Drive, Amarillo, Texas.

The gardens were established on November 17, 1968, after a number of years of fundraising.
