= Nathaniel J. Neal Unit =

Prison in Texas, United States

Coordinates: 35°14′28″N 101°44′14″W

- Interactive map of Nathaniel J. Neal Unit
- Location: 9055 Spur 591 Amarillo, Texas address
- Security class: G1, G2, G4
- Capacity: 1732
- Opened: December 1994
- Managed by: Texas Department of Criminal Justice
- Warden: Sergio Perez; Asst. Warden = Charles Bristow

The Nathaniel J. Neal Unit is a state prison for men located in unincorporated Potter County, Texas, near Amarillo. It is owned and operated by the Texas Department of Criminal Justice. This facility was opened in December 1994, and a maximum capacity of 1732 male inmates held at various security levels. Sergio Perez, Senior Warden - Charles Bristow, Assistant Warden.

The prison is immediately adjacent to the state's Clements Unit.

The Neal Unit was closed due to "maintenance" issues in 2020 and set to re-open in 2022, it has not been opened since.
