= Amarillo City Transit =

Provider of bus transportation in Amarillo, Texas

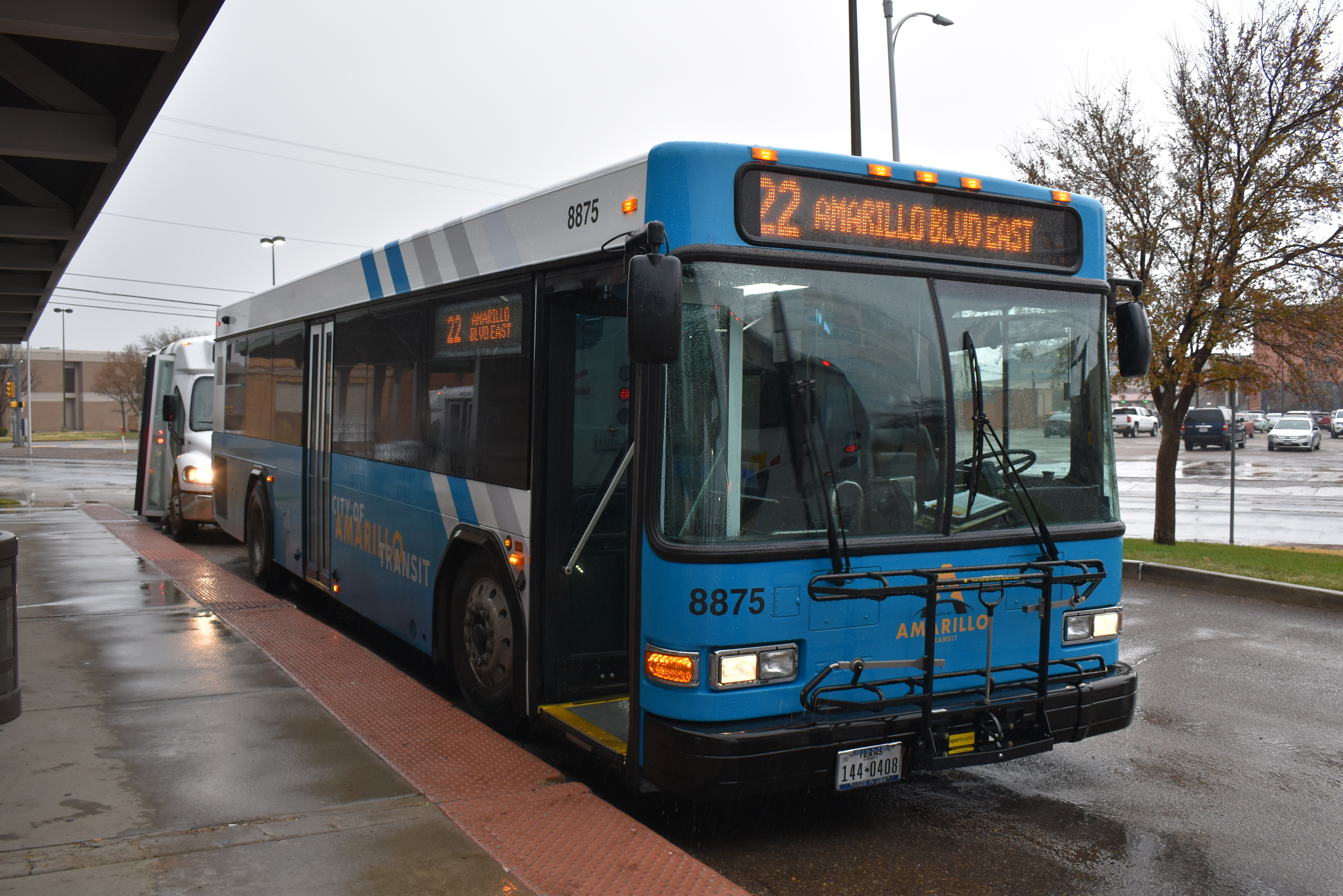
- An Amarillo City Transit bus at the downtown transfer center
- Founded: 1966
- Headquarters: 801 SE 23rd Avenue
- Locale: Amarillo, Texas
- Service area: Potter County, Texas; Randall County, Texas
- Service type: bus service, paratransit
- Routes: 13
- Website: amarillo.gov/amarillo-city-transit

Amarillo City Transit, marketed under the moniker of ACT, is the primary provider of mass transportation in Amarillo, Texas. The agency was established in 1966, after a municipal takeover of private bus transportation. Thirteen routes run through the city daily but Sundays and holidays.

On February 28, 2024, the city opened a new Multimodal Transfer Station to the west of downtown. The $8.6 million facility serves both local buses and Greyhound.

== Routes ==
As of August 27, 2018, the new route plan was implemented.

- 11 SW 6th Avenue - SW 9th Avenue - South Coulter Street - Westgate Mall
- 12 NW 3rd Avenue - West Amarillo Boulevard
- 13 hospital district- west gate mall
- 21 Hamlet
- 22 East Amarillo Boulevard - North Grant Street
- 23 East Amarillo Boulevard - NE 24th Avenue
- 31 SE 10th Avenue - South Grand Street
- 32 SE 3rd Avenue - Ross Street - Osage Street - SE 34 Avenue
- 33 SE 3rd Avenue - South Arthur Street - Wolflin Avenue - DMV - I-40 east
- 41 Washington Street
- 42 I-27
- 43 SW 10th Avenue - South Georgia Street - SW 45th Avenue - Soncy Road - Westgate Mall
- 44 SW 3rd Avenue - South Georgia Street - Plains Boulevard - South Western Street - SW 34th Avenue - Soncy Road - Westgate Mall

Previous Routes

- 1 North Hughes
- 2 North Polk
- 3 Amarillo Blvd
- 4 Sunrise
- 5 South Washington
- 6 Wolfin Village
- 7 Western Plaza
- 8 Medical Center
