= Texas Tech University at Amarillo =

American off-campus teaching site

- Type: State university Branch campus
- Parent institution: Texas Tech University
- Location: Amarillo, Texas, United States; 35.200425°N 101.923599°W

Texas Tech University at Amarillo, located in Amarillo, Texas, is an official off campus teaching site of Lubbock-based Texas Tech University. It hosts master's degrees in systems and engineering management and manufacturing and engineering through both on-site and online courses as part of Texas Tech's Department of Industrial Engineering.
