= Amarillo National Bank =

Bank based in Amarillo, Texas

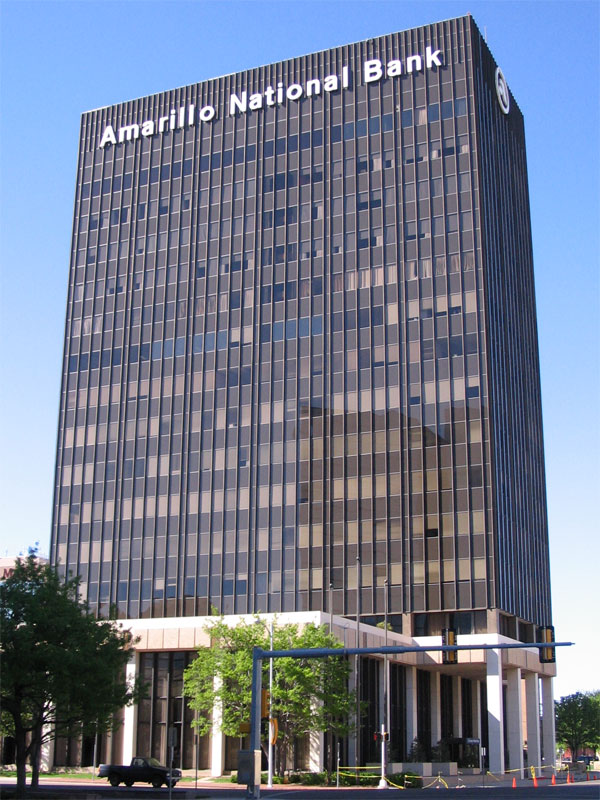
- The Amarillo National Bank Plaza One building in downtown Amarillo
- Type: Private
- Industry: Finance
- Founded: 1892; 134 years ago, in Amarillo, Texas, U.S.
- Headquarters: Amarillo, Texas, U.S.
- Products: Financial services
- Number of employees: 695
- Website: www.anb.com

Amarillo National Bank (ANB) is a private bank providing commercial banking and personal banking across Texas. It is based in Amarillo, Texas. In 2019, ANB acquired Lubbock National Bank, expanding its locations beyond the Texas Panhandle and into the South Plains and other parts of the state. As ANB, the bank operates 19 branch locations in and around the cities of Amarillo, Borger and Canyon. As Lubbock National Bank, it operates six branch locations in Lubbock. Under the name Commerce National Bank, it operates seven locations in the cities of Bryan, College Station, Fort Worth, and two suburbs of Austin. The bank operates 116 local, branded automatic teller machines (ATMs) in those communities. As of the end of 2019, it claimed to have more than $5.7 billion in assets. ANB employed 695 people as of August 2016.

The bank was formed in 1892 and has been owned by the Ware family since 1909. ANB is known as the largest, 100-percent family-owned bank in the United States. In 1999, the magazine Texas Monthly called the Wares the "bankers of the century."

The bank is headquartered in two high-rise buildings in downtown Amarillo. The 16-story Amarillo National Bank Plaza One opened in 1971, and the 12-story Amarillo National Bank Plaza Two complex was completed in 1984.

ANB is known for opening Texas’ first drive-up bank window (1950) and the first automatic teller machine in Texas (1978), which was located in the bank's downtown lobby. Also in 1978, the bank began construction on what was then the largest drive-up banking facility in the United States, at 10th Avenue and Taylor Street in Amarillo.

As of 2019, Amarillo National Bank ranked as the 25th largest farm lender in the nation, with 15 percent of its loans concentrated on agriculture. It is the largest mortgage lender in the Texas Panhandle and the largest independent cattle lender in Texas.

ANB donates more than $2 million a year to local charities. During the holiday season, ANB allows each of its employees to designate a $100 check to any charity of the employee's choice. In addition, the bank invests heavily in the financial education of Texas residents with its ANB Smart program, and participates in the national Teach Children to Save campaign and the Get Smart About Credit program from the American Bankers Association.

Amarillo National Bank owns the naming rights to the Amarillo National Center, a 10,000-seat multipurpose arena built in 2000.

== History ==
The bank was formed in 1892 as First National Bank of Amarillo, located at 4th Avenue and Polk Street. Local cattleman Benjamin Taliaferro (B.T.) Ware, one of the earliest settlers in the area, became vice president of First National Bank in 1895 until moving to Fort Worth, Texas in 1899. Ware returned in 1900 and bought the bank. He operated it until 1906, when he sold his stock and organized the Western Bank and Trust Company. In 1909, Ware repurchased the Amarillo bank and merged it with Western Bank and Trust, forming Amarillo National Bank. Members of the Ware family have owned and operated the bank ever since.

In 1986, ANB purchased Borger's Bank in Borger, Texas. The acquisitions of Lubbock National Bank and Commerce National Bank were announced in October 2018 and finalized in March 2019.

== Owners ==
The current owners of Amarillo National Bank represent the fourth and fifth generations of the Ware family. In 2017, bank chairman Richard Ware II was named "Banker of the Year" by the trade newspaper American Banker. In 2018, ANB announced that two of Richard Ware's triplet sons would take over leadership of the bank. While Richard Ware remains chairman of the bank, Patrick Ware currently serves as vice chairman and William Ware is president of ANB. The younger Wares were originally elected to director positions on Amarillo National Bank's board in 2008. Additional Ware family members hold officer positions within the bank.

== See also ==
- List of tallest buildings in Amarillo
