= National Weather Service Amarillo, Texas =

Amarillo, Texas Weather Forecast Office
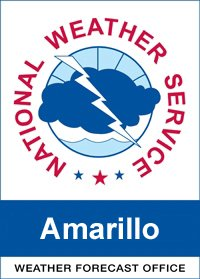

Agency overview
- Jurisdiction: Federal Government of the United States
- Headquarters: 1900 English Road, Amarillo, Texas 79108
- Employees: 18
- Agency executives: Mike Gittinger Acting MIC, Meteorologist in Charge; Mike Gittinger Warning Coordination Meteorologist -Joanne Culin WCM, Warning Coordination Meteorologist
- Parent agency: National Weather Service
- Website: www.weather.gov/ama

The National Weather Service Amarillo, Texas, is a weather forecast office that serves 23 counties in the Texas and Oklahoma Panhandles by providing weather forecasts for the many communities it serves as well as airports in Guymon, Dalhart, and Amarillo. The office was established on January 1, 1892, only 5 years after the city of Amarillo was founded. The office operates a WSR-88D (NEXRAD) radar and a number of ASOS sensor suites in order to monitor the latest weather conditions. An AWIPS system is used by the office to produce forecasts, warnings, and advisories.

== History ==
The first Amarillo weather office was established by moving the Army Signal office from Fort Sill, Indian Territory (now Oklahoma). Mr. Wayland Bailey, Observer in Charge, relocated the office furnishings and instrumentation into the Amarillo Opera House which was located at the northwest corner of Polk and 5th streets. The instrumentation was located on the roof of this building.

In this age of rapid weather dissemination of severe weather watches and warnings, Mr. Bailey did not have much foresight. In 1894, Mr. Bailey wrote in the local station log: "I respectfully recommend that cold wave signals and rain warnings be discontinued, as they are of little benefit to this community." At that time, cold wave signals were generally issued after cold air had already arrived. The signals were disseminated in the form of a six by eight foot flag, which was raised at the weather office. Also, as is today, the Weather Bureau depended on local media such as the "Amarillo Champion" and the "Northwesterner" to relay this information to the public.

By 1895, Mr. Bailey began to appreciate just how important forecasts and warnings were to the people of this region. Again he wrote in the station log: "The citizens of the town take considerable interest in the forecasts, but are more interested in the probable force and direction of the wind, which is the most important feature of the weather here." More than one hundred years later, the same can be said today.

Three more men held the title of Observer in Charge, until April 1902 when Mr. Peter Wood became the first Official in Charge. Mr. Wood opened Amarillo's first Weather Bureau building in June 1903 on the southeast corner of Taylor and Seventh Streets. This two-story building housed the weather office on its first floor, with quarters for the Official in Charge on the second floor.

In November 1906, Mr. T.J. Considine took the reins of the Amarillo Weather Bureau and held them until he died in January 1925. Mr. Considine may have been Amarillo's first true weatherman because during his tenure, he recorded a wide variety of weather conditions. Mr. Considine wrote of winters that created snow drifts of four to five feet that suspended local street car service. He endured record breaking snowfalls that still stand in current record books. In 1908, perhaps the first Weather Bureau account of an Amarillo tornado was recorded on June 6. Mr. Considine wrote: "several funnel shaped clouds were quite noticeable, their distance from the station being between 2 to 3 miles. One of these tornadic conditions descended about two miles outside of town, damaging a dwelling house and a wind mill."

Through the early part of this century, the Weather Bureau in Amarillo continued to grow from a one-man station to one that employed several employees. By the early 1930s, the Bureau's focus began to shift to a rapidly growing aviation industry. A separate Weather Bureau Airport Station was established at English Field in 1932. The Weather Bureau later closed the station in 1935 and transferred airport observing responsibilities to the Civil Aeronautics Administration.

The focus on aviation prompted the move of the Weather Bureau into the Department of Commerce in June 1940. In April 1941, the Weather Bureau closed its downtown office and consolidated all weather observing activities at the Amarillo Air Terminal. Mr. Henry Winburn became Amarillo's first Meteorologist in Charge and continued in that position until his death in 1962. Like Mr. Considine, Winburn dealt with a great many changes and problems.

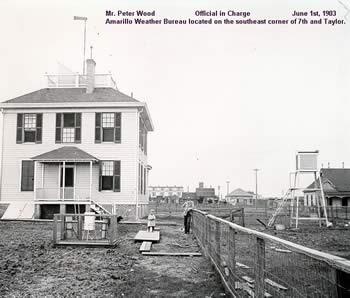
Amarillo Weather Bureau, June 1, 1903

With the outbreak of World War II, Mr. Winburn had to manage with a rapid change in personnel. The war created a shortage of personnel in an organization that was predominately staffed with male employees. A manpower shortage resulted in a large influx of women employees into the Bureau. The Amarillo office employed eleven female observers from the period of 1943 through 1946. However, the first female employee was Miss Angela Considine who was employed by her father as an assistant observer in 1920.

Throughout the early history of the Weather Bureau, severe weather or tornado warnings were not issued. The Bureau felt that these warnings would do nothing more than panic the local populations. In fact, the word "tornado" was considered taboo until warnings were first issued in 1950. This policy did not deter Winburn who, in May 1949, pioneered broadcast warnings. Winburn went on the radio airwaves to warn Amarilloans of an impending tornado. Six persons died in the tornado, and a local newspaper was highly critical of Weather Bureau actions. An investigation revealed that the local office responded quite appropriately, especially considering the Weather Bureau policy on warnings. In fact, the local office received letters of commendation from the Chief of the Bureau and the Secretary of Commerce.

Winburn was also involved in the implementation of the first operational weather radars. In 1952, a Radar Storm Detection Unit, which was a modified World War II Navy radar, was installed in Amarillo. Then, in 1961, one of the Weather Bureau's first network weather radars (WSR-57) was commissioned in Amarillo. Other rapid changes in technology were ushered in by Winburn, such as the installation of warning teletype communications in 1955, and the transfer of Upper Atmospheric (Radiosonde) observations to the local office in 1956.

The Amarillo Weather Bureau office remained in the Amarillo Terminal until 1975. At that time, a new facility was constructed at 1920 English Road to house the ever expanding technology and usher in the computer age. By this time, the National Oceanic and Atmospheric Administration had been created by the Department of Commerce, and the Weather Bureau became the National Weather Service.

The office was moved to its present location of 1900 English Road in 1989. The new office was constructed to accommodate not only the latest advances in technology, but also a larger staff. Meteorologists were added to the staff, which resulted in forecasting responsibilities for the Texas and Oklahoma Panhandles. In 1992, an Automated Surface Observing System was commissioned, one of the first of its kind in the nation. A WSR-88D Doppler Weather Radar was commissioned in March 1994. This radar was the second commissioned in the country and the first in the state of Texas.

== NOAA Weather Radio ==
The National Weather Service office in Amarillo broadcasts several NOAA Weather Radio stations across its county warning area.

== Counties served ==
The Counties listed below are monitored 24/7 by the National Weather Service Office in Amarillo, Texas

=== Oklahoma Panhandle ===
- Beaver
- Cimarron
- Texas

=== Texas Panhandle ===
- Armstrong
- Carson
- Collingsworth
- Dallam
- Deaf Smith
- Donley
- Gray
- Hansford
- Hartley
- Hutchinson
- Hemphill
- Lipscomb
- Moore
- Potter
- Oldham
- Ochiltree
- Randall
- Roberts
- Sherman
- Wheeler
