= 1992 United States House of Representatives elections in Texas =

- November 3, 1992

All 30 Texas seats to the United States House of Representatives
| | Majority party | Minority party |
|---|---|---|
| Party | Democratic | Republican |
| Last election | 19 | 8 |
| Seats won | 21 | 9 |
| Seat change | ▲2 | ▲1 |
| Popular vote | 2,806,044 | 2,685,973 |
| Percentage | 49.91% | 47.77% |
| Swing | ▼3.88% | ▲2.07% |

Democratic
50–60%
60–70%
70–80%
80–90%
90>%
Republican
40–50%
50–60%
60–70%
70–80%
80–90%
90>%

The 1992 United States House of Representatives elections in Texas occurred on November 3, 1992, to elect the members of the state of Texas's delegation to the United States House of Representatives. Texas had thirty seats in the House, apportioned according to the 1990 United States census.

Intraparty conflict embroiled the Texas Democratic Party, who had gained complete control of Texas' government following Ann Richards' victory in the 1990 gubernatorial election. State Senator Eddie Bernice Johnson chaired the redistricting subcommittee and drew maps with the intention of creating a minority-majority district in Dallas for herself to run in. This drew the ire of representatives Martin Frost and John Wiley Bryant, whose districts would become considerably more White and Republican-leaning as a result. A majority-Hispanic district was also created in Houston alongside District 18, a plurality-Black district. The Texas Legislature sided with Johnson's plan and adopted new congressional districts during a special session in 1991.

These elections occurred simultaneously with the United States Senate elections of 1992, the United States House elections in other states, the presidential election, and various state and local elections. This is the last time the Democratic Party would win the popular vote in Texas's U.S. House races until 2026, though Democrats would continue to hold a majority of House seats until 2004.

== Overview ==
1992 United States House of Representatives elections in Texas
| Party | Votes | Percentage | Seats before | Seats after | +/– |
|---|---|---|---|---|---|
| Democratic | 2,806,044 | 49.91% | 19 | 21 | +2 |
| Republican | 2,685,973 | 47.77% | 8 | 9 | +1 |
| Libertarian | 110,832 | 1.97% | 0 | 0 | - |
| Independent | 19,623 | 0.35% | 0 | 0 | - |
| Totals | 5,622,472 | 100.00% | 27 | 30 | +3 |

== Congressional districts ==
=== District 1 ===
Incumbent Democrat Jim Chapman ran for re-election unopposed.

Texas's 1st congressional district, 1992
| Party | Candidate | Votes | % |
|---|---|---|---|
| Democratic | Jim Chapman (incumbent) | 152,209 | 100.00 |
| Total votes | | 152,209 | 100 |
| Democratic hold | | | |

=== District 2 ===
1992 Texas's 2nd congressional district election
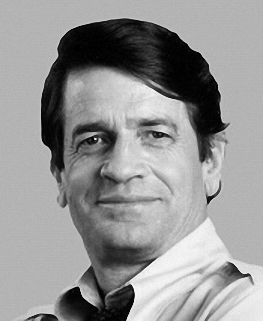

| Nominee | Charlie Wilson | Donna Peterson |
| Party | Democratic | Republican |
| Popular vote | 118,625 | 92,176 |
| Percentage | 56.1% | 43.6% |
- County results Wilson: 50–60% 60–70% Peterson: 40–50% 50–60%
U.S. Representative before election
Charlie Wilson
Democratic
Elected U.S. Representative
Charlie Wilson
Democratic

Incumbent Democrat Charlie Wilson ran for re-election.

Texas's 2nd congressional district, 1992
| Party | Candidate | Votes | % |
|---|---|---|---|
| Democratic | Charlie Wilson (incumbent) | 118,625 | 56.13 |
| Republican | Donna Peterson | 92,176 | 43.61 |
| Write-in | Roger Northen | 549 | 0.26 |
| Total votes | | 211,350 | 100 |
| Democratic hold | | | |

=== District 3 ===
Incumbent Republican Steve Bartlett resigned in 1991 after he was elected Mayor of Dallas. This prompted a special election to be held, which fellow Republican Sam Johnson won in a runoff. He ran for re-election.

Texas's 3rd congressional district, 1992
| Party | Candidate | Votes | % |
|---|---|---|---|
| Republican | Sam Johnson (incumbent) | 201,569 | 86.09 |
| Libertarian | Noel Kopala | 32,570 | 13.91 |
| Total votes | | 234,139 | 100 |
| Republican hold | | | |

=== District 4 ===
1992 Texas' 4th congressional district election
- November 3, 1992
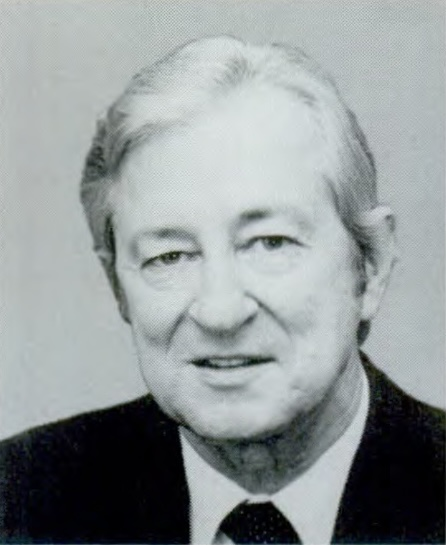

| Nominee | Ralph Hall | David Bridges |
| Party | Democratic | Republican |
| Popular vote | 128,008 | 83,875 |
| Percentage | 58.1% | 38.1% |
- County results Hall: 40–50% 50–60% 60–70% 70–80% Bridges: 50–60%
U.S. Representative before election
Ralph Hall
Democratic
Elected U.S. Representative
Ralph Hall
Democratic

Incumbent Democrat Ralph Hall ran for re-election.

Texas's 4th congressional district, 1992
| Party | Candidate | Votes | % |
|---|---|---|---|
| Democratic | Ralph M. Hall (incumbent) | 128,008 | 58.10 |
| Republican | David Bridges | 83,875 | 38.07 |
| Libertarian | Steven Rothacker | 8,450 | 3.84 |
| Total votes | | 220,333 | 100 |
| Democratic hold | | | |

=== District 5 ===
1992 Texas's 5th congressional district election
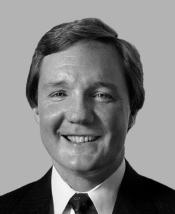

| Nominee | John Wiley Bryant | Richard Stokley |
| Party | Democratic | Republican |
| Popular vote | 98,567 | 62,419 |
| Percentage | 58.9% | 37.3% |
- County results Wilson: 50–60% 60–70% 70–80%
U.S. Representative before election
John Wiley Bryant
Democratic
Elected U.S. Representative
John Wiley Bryant
Democratic

Incumbent Democrat John Wiley Bryant ran for re-election.

Texas's 5th congressional district, 1992
| Party | Candidate | Votes | % |
|---|---|---|---|
| Democratic | John Wiley Bryant (incumbent) | 98,567 | 58.91 |
| Republican | Richard Stokley | 62,419 | 37.30 |
| Libertarian | William Walker | 6,344 | 3.79 |
| Total votes | | 167,330 | 100 |
| Democratic hold | | | |

=== District 6 ===
Incumbent Republican Joe Barton ran for re-election.

Texas's 6th congressional district, 1992
| Party | Candidate | Votes | % |
|---|---|---|---|
| Republican | Joe Barton (incumbent) | 189,140 | 71.90 |
| Democratic | John Dietrich | 73,933 | 28.10 |
| Total votes | | 263,073 | 100 |
| Republican hold | | | |

=== District 7 ===
Incumbent Republican Bill Archer ran for re-election unopposed.

Texas's 7th congressional district, 1992
| Party | Candidate | Votes | % |
|---|---|---|---|
| Republican | Bill Archer (incumbent) | 169,407 | 100.00 |
| Total votes | | 169,407 | 100 |
| Republican hold | | | |

=== District 8 ===
Incumbent Republican Jack Fields ran for re-election.

Texas's 8th congressional district, 1992
| Party | Candidate | Votes | % |
|---|---|---|---|
| Republican | Jack Fields (incumbent) | 179,349 | 77.03 |
| Democratic | Chas. Robinson | 53,473 | 22.97 |
| Total votes | | 232,822 | 100 |
| Republican hold | | | |

=== District 9 ===
1992 Texas's 9th congressional district election
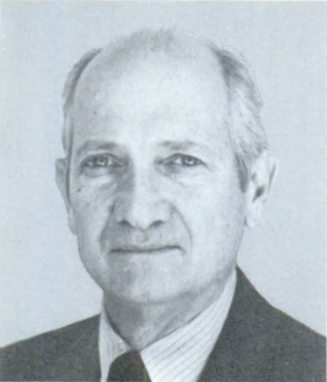

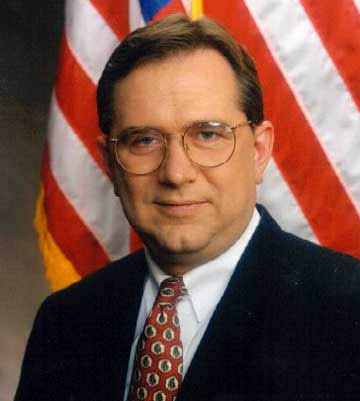
| Nominee | Jack Brooks | Steve Stockman |
| Party | Democratic | Republican |
| Popular vote | 118,690 | 96,270 |
| Percentage | 53.6% | 43.5% |
- County results Brooks: 50–60% 60–70% Stockman: 60–70%
U.S. Representative before election
Jack Brooks
Democratic
Elected U.S. Representative
Jack Brooks
Democratic

Incumbent Democrat Jack Brooks ran for re-election.

Texas's 9th congressional district, 1992
| Party | Candidate | Votes | % |
|---|---|---|---|
| Democratic | Jack Brooks (incumbent) | 118,690 | 53.62 |
| Republican | Steve Stockman | 96,270 | 43.49 |
| Libertarian | Billy Joe Crawford | 6,401 | 2.89 |
| Total votes | | 221,361 | 100 |
| Democratic hold | | | |

=== District 10 ===
Incumbent Democrat J. J. Pickle ran for re-election.

Texas's 10th congressional district, 1992
| Party | Candidate | Votes | % |
|---|---|---|---|
| Democratic | J. J. Pickle (incumbent) | 177,233 | 67.67 |
| Republican | Herbert Spiro | 68,646 | 26.21 |
| Libertarian | Terry Blum | 6,353 | 2.43 |
| Independent | Jeff Davis | 6,056 | 2.31 |
| Write-in | Stephen Hopkins | 3,510 | 1.34 |
| Write-in | Robert Shaw | 94 | 0.04 |
| Total votes | | 261,892 | 100 |
| Democratic hold | | | |

=== District 11 ===
1992 Texas's 11th congressional district election
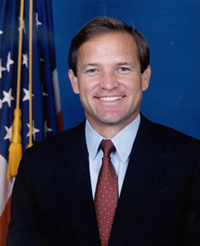

| Nominee | Chet Edwards | James Broyles |
| Party | Democratic | Republican |
| Popular vote | 119,999 | 58,033 |
| Percentage | 67.4% | 32.6% |
- County results Edwards: 60–70% 70–80%
U.S. Representative before election
Chet Edwards
Democratic
Elected U.S. Representative
Chet Edwards
Democratic

Incumbent Democrat Chet Edwards ran for re-election.

Texas's 11th congressional district, 1992
| Party | Candidate | Votes | % |
|---|---|---|---|
| Democratic | Chet Edwards (incumbent) | 119,999 | 67.40 |
| Republican | James Broyles | 58,033 | 32.60 |
| Total votes | | 178,032 | 100 |
| Democratic hold | | | |

=== District 12 ===
Incumbent Democrat Pete Geren ran for re-election.

Texas's 12th congressional district, 1992
| Party | Candidate | Votes | % |
|---|---|---|---|
| Democratic | Pete Geren (incumbent) | 125,492 | 62.77 |
| Republican | David Hobbs | 74,432 | 37.23 |
| Total votes | | 199,924 | 100 |
| Democratic hold | | | |

=== District 13 ===
1992 Texas's 13th congressional district election
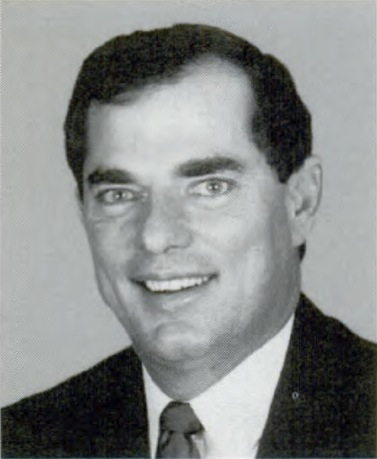

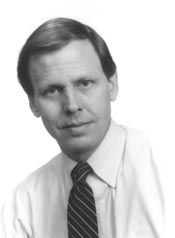
| Nominee | Bill Sarpalius | Beau Boulter |
| Party | Democratic | Republican |
| Popular vote | 117,892 | 77,514 |
| Percentage | 60.3% | 39.7% |
- County results Sarpalius: 50–60% 60–70% 70–80% 80–90% Boulter: 50–60%
U.S. Representative before election
Bill Sarpalius
Democratic
Elected U.S. Representative
Bill Sarpalius
Democratic

Incumbent Democrat Bill Sarpalius ran for re-election. Beau Boulter, who held the seat until 1989, ran against him.

Texas's 13th congressional district, 1992
| Party | Candidate | Votes | % |
|---|---|---|---|
| Democratic | Bill Sarpalius (incumbent) | 117,892 | 60.33 |
| Republican | Beau Boulter | 77,514 | 39.67 |
| Total votes | | 195,406 | 100 |
| Democratic hold | | | |

=== District 14 ===
1992 Texas's 14th congressional district election
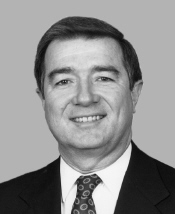

| Nominee | Greg Laughlin | Bert Garza |
| Party | Democratic | Republican |
| Popular vote | 135,930 | 54,412 |
| Percentage | 68.1% | 27.3% |
- County results Laughlin: 50–60% 60–70% 70–80% 80–90% Garza: 50–60%

Incumbent Democrat Greg Laughlin ran for re-election.

Texas's 14th congressional district, 1992
| Party | Candidate | Votes | % |
|---|---|---|---|
| Democratic | Greg Laughlin (incumbent) | 135,930 | 68.08 |
| Republican | Bert Garza | 54,412 | 27.25 |
| Independent | Vic Vreeland | 9,329 | 4.67 |
| Total votes | | 199,671 | 100 |
| Democratic hold | | | |

=== District 15 ===
1992 Texas's 15th congressional district election
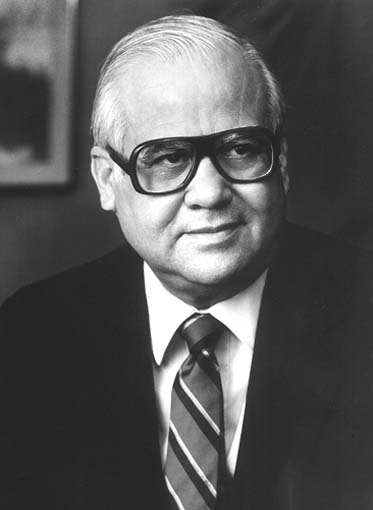

| Nominee | Kika de la Garza | Tom Haughey |
| Party | Democratic | Republican |
| Popular vote | 86,351 | 56,549 |
| Percentage | 60.4% | 39.6% |
- County results De la Garza: 50–60% 60–70% 70–80% 80–90% Haughey: 50–60%

Incumbent Democrat Kika de la Garza ran for re-election.

Texas's 15th congressional district, 1992
| Party | Candidate | Votes | % |
|---|---|---|---|
| Democratic | Kika de la Garza (incumbent) | 86,351 | 60.43 |
| Republican | Tom Haughey | 56,549 | 39.57 |
| Total votes | | 142,900 | 100 |
| Democratic hold | | | |

=== District 16 ===
Incumbent Democrat Ronald D. Coleman ran for re-election.

Texas's 16th congressional district, 1992
| Party | Candidate | Votes | % |
|---|---|---|---|
| Democratic | Ronald D. Coleman (incumbent) | 66,731 | 51.89 |
| Republican | Chip Taberski | 61,870 | 48.11 |
| Total votes | | 128,601 | 100 |
| Democratic hold | | | |

=== District 17 ===
1992 Texas's 17th congressional district election
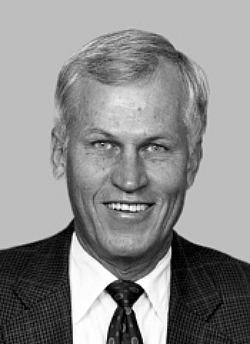

| Nominee | Charles Stenholm | Jeannie Sadowski |
| Party | Democratic | Republican |
| Popular vote | 136,213 | 69,958 |
| Percentage | 66.1% | 33.9% |
- County results Stenholm: 50–60% 60–70% 70–80%
U.S. Representative before election
Charles Stenholm
Democratic
Elected U.S. Representative
Charles Stenholm
Democratic

Incumbent Democrat Charles Stenholm ran for re-election.

Texas's 17th congressional district, 1992
| Party | Candidate | Votes | % |
|---|---|---|---|
| Democratic | Charles Stenholm (incumbent) | 136,213 | 66.07 |
| Republican | Jeannie Sadowski | 69,958 | 33.93 |
| Total votes | | 206,171 | 100 |
| Democratic hold | | | |

=== District 18 ===
Incumbent Democrat Craig Washington ran for re-election. The district was intentionally drawn to have an African-American majority population, but the methods used to draw this district would be found unconstitutional by the Supreme Court case Bush v. Vera in 1996.

Texas's 18th congressional district, 1992
| Party | Candidate | Votes | % |
|---|---|---|---|
| Democratic | Craig Washington (incumbent) | 111,422 | 64.70 |
| Republican | Edward Blum | 56,080 | 32.57 |
| Libertarian | Gregg Lassen | 4,706 | 2.73 |
| Total votes | | 172,208 | 100 |
| Democratic hold | | | |

=== District 19 ===
1992 Texas's 19th congressional district election
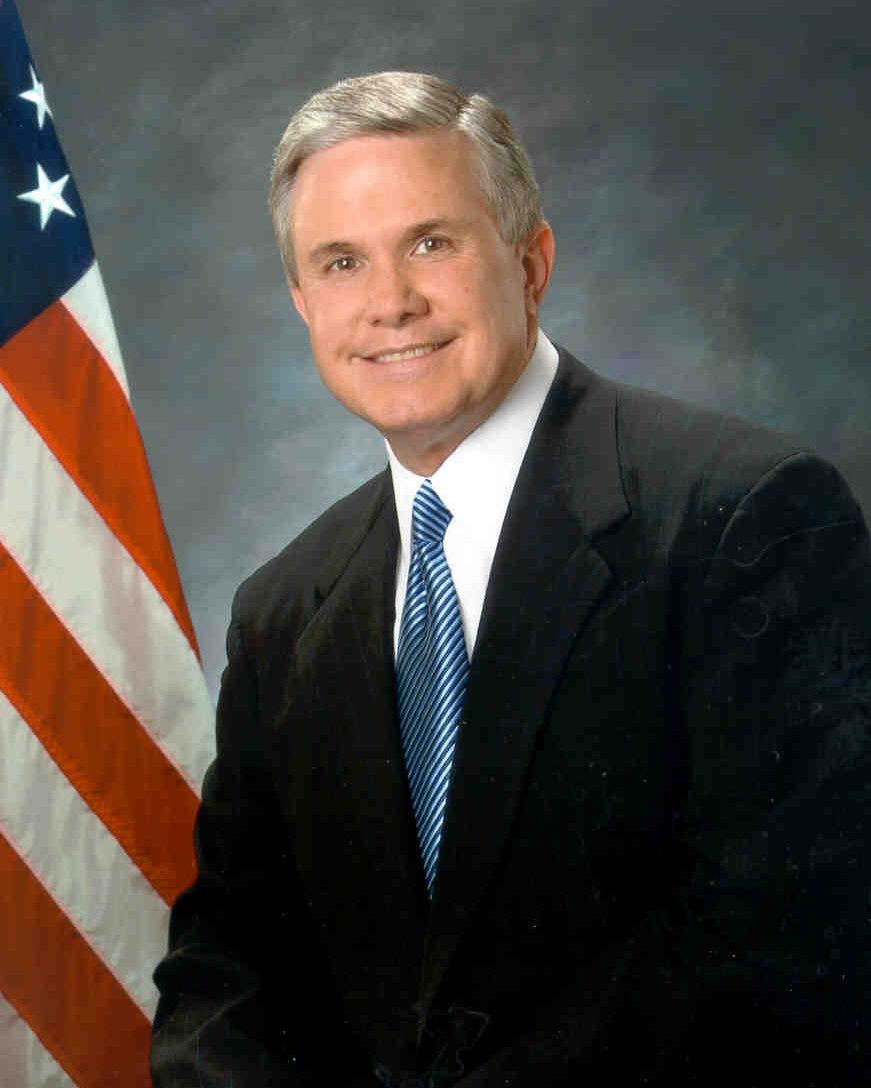

| Nominee | Larry Combest | Terry Lee Moser |
| Party | Republican | Democratic |
| Popular vote | 162,057 | 47,325 |
| Percentage | 77.4% | 22.6% |
- County results Combest: 60–70% 70–80% 80–90%
U.S. Representative before election
Larry Combest
Republican
Elected U.S. Representative
Larry Combest
Republican

Incumbent Republican Larry Combest ran for re-election.

Texas's 19th congressional district, 1992
| Party | Candidate | Votes | % |
|---|---|---|---|
| Republican | Larry Combest (incumbent) | 162,057 | 77.40 |
| Democratic | Terry Lee Moser | 47,325 | 22.60 |
| Total votes | | 209,382 | 100 |
| Republican hold | | | |

=== District 20 ===
Incumbent Democrat Henry B. González ran for re-election unopposed.

Texas's 20th congressional district, 1992
| Party | Candidate | Votes | % |
|---|---|---|---|
| Democratic | Henry B. Gonzalez (incumbent) | 103,755 | 100.00 |
| Total votes | | 103,755 | 100 |
| Democratic hold | | | |

=== District 21 ===
1992 Texas's 21st congressional district election
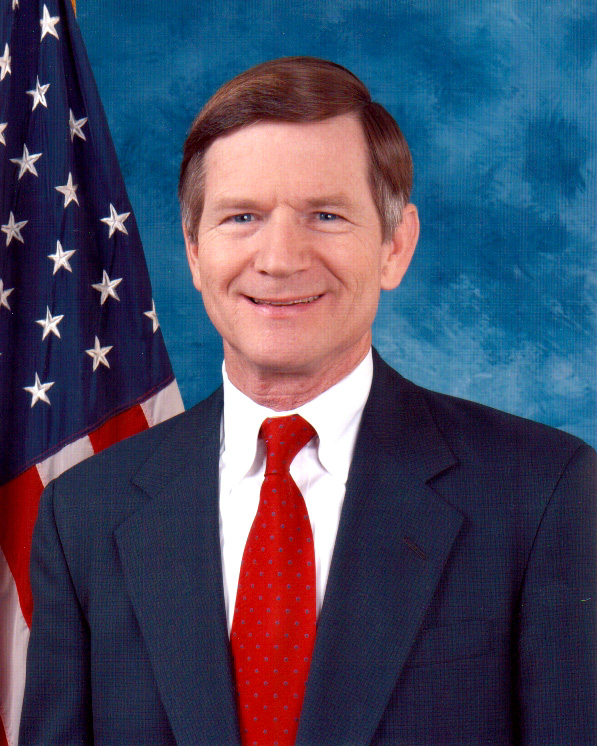

| Nominee | Lamar Smith | James Gaddy |
| Party | Republican | Democratic |
| Popular vote | 190,979 | 62,827 |
| Percentage | 72.2% | 23.7% |
- County results Smith: 50–60% 60–70% 70–80% 80–90%
U.S. Representative before election
Lamar Smith
Republican
Elected U.S. Representative
Lamar Smith
Republican

Incumbent Republican Lamar Smith successfully ran for re-election.

Texas's 21st congressional district, 1992
| Party | Candidate | Votes | % |
|---|---|---|---|
| Republican | Lamar Smith (incumbent) | 190,979 | 72.16 |
| Democratic | James Gaddy | 62,827 | 23.74 |
| Libertarian | William Grisham | 10,847 | 4.10 |
| Total votes | | 264,653 | 100 |
| Republican hold | | | |

=== District 22 ===
1992 Texas's 22nd congressional district election
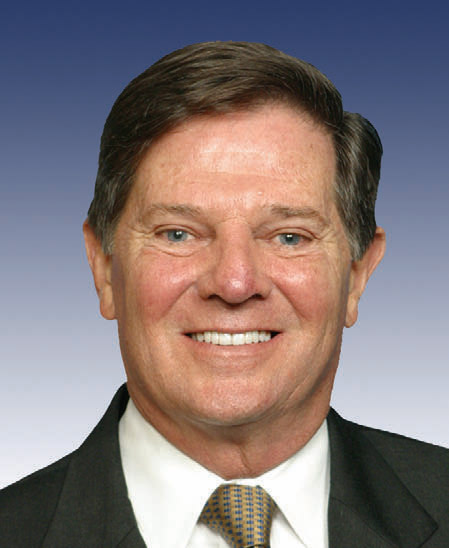

| Nominee | Tom DeLay | Richard Konrad |
| Party | Republican | Democratic |
| Popular vote | 150,221 | 67,812 |
| Percentage | 68.9% | 31.1% |
- County results DeLay: 60–70% 70–80%
U.S. Representative before election
Tom DeLay
Republican
Elected U.S. Representative
Tom DeLay
Republican

Incumbent Republican Tom DeLay ran for re-election.

Texas's 22nd congressional district, 1992
| Party | Candidate | Votes | % |
|---|---|---|---|
| Republican | Tom DeLay (incumbent) | 150,221 | 68.90 |
| Democratic | Richard Konrad | 67,812 | 31.10 |
| Total votes | | 218,033 | 100 |
| Republican hold | | | |

=== District 23 ===
1992 Texas's 23rd congressional district election
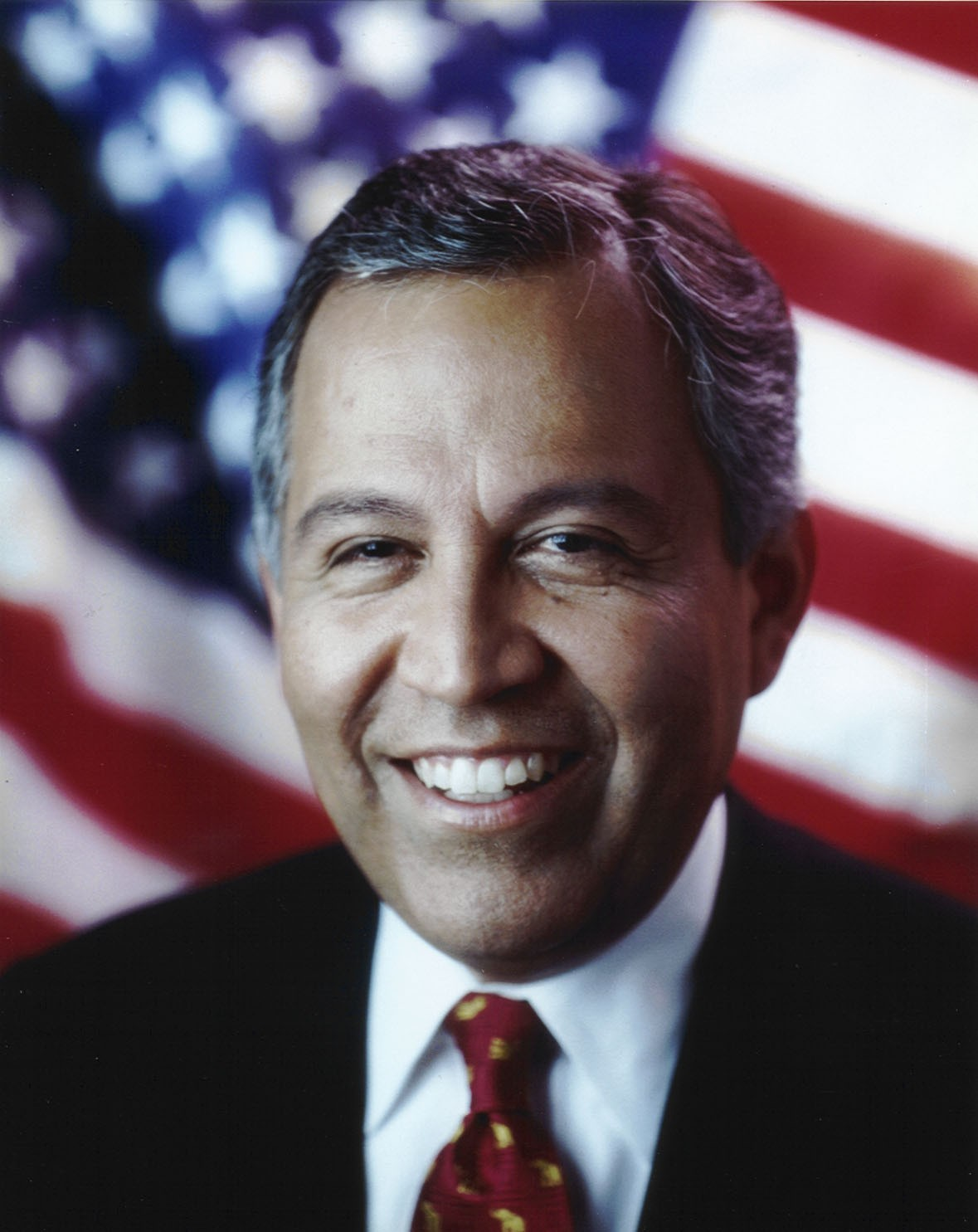

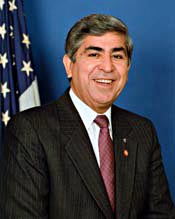
| Nominee | Henry Bonilla | Albert Bustamante |
| Party | Republican | Democratic |
| Popular vote | 98,259 | 63,797 |
| Percentage | 59.1% | 38.4% |
- County results Bonilla: 40–50% 50–60% 60–70% 70–80% 80–90% Bustamante: 50–60% 60–70% 70–80%
U.S. Representative before election
Albert Bustamante
Democratic
Elected U.S. Representative
Henry Bonilla
Republican

Incumbent Democrat Albert Bustamante ran for re-election.

Texas's 23rd congressional district, 1992
| Party | Candidate | Votes | % |
|---|---|---|---|
| Republican | Henry Bonilla | 98,259 | 59.07 |
| Democratic | Albert Bustamante (incumbent) | 63,797 | 38.35 |
| Libertarian | David Alter | 4,291 | 2.58 |
| Total votes | | 166,347 | 100.00 |
| Republican gain from Democratic | | | |

=== District 24 ===
1992 Texas's 24th congressional district election
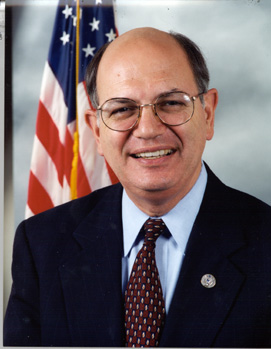

| Nominee | Martin Frost | Steve Masterson |
| Party | Democratic | Republican |
| Popular vote | 104,174 | 70,042 |
| Percentage | 59.8% | 40.2% |
- County results Frost: 50–60% 60–70%
U.S. Representative before election
Martin Frost
Democratic
Elected U.S. Representative
Martin Frost
Democratic

Incumbent Democrat Martin Frost successfully ran for re-election, defeating Republican Steve Masterson by almost 20 points.

Texas's 24th congressional district, 1992
| Party | Candidate | Votes | % |
|---|---|---|---|
| Democratic | Martin Frost (incumbent) | 104,174 | 59.80 |
| Republican | Steve Masterson | 70,042 | 40.20 |
| Total votes | | 174,216 | 100 |
| Democratic hold | | | |

=== District 25 ===
Incumbent Democrat Michael A. Andrews ran for re-election.

Texas's 25th congressional district, 1992
| Party | Candidate | Votes | % |
|---|---|---|---|
| Democratic | Michael A. Andrews (incumbent) | 98,975 | 55.96 |
| Republican | Dolly Madison McKenna | 73,192 | 41.38 |
| Libertarian | Richard Mauk | 4,710 | 2.66 |
| Total votes | | 176,877 | 100 |
| Democratic hold | | | |

=== District 26 ===
Incumbent Republican Dick Armey ran for re-election.

Texas's 26th congressional district, 1992
| Party | Candidate | Votes | % |
|---|---|---|---|
| Republican | Dick Armey (incumbent) | 150,209 | 73.08 |
| Democratic | John Wayne Caton | 55,237 | 26.88 |
| Write-in | Steve Love | 85 | 0.04 |
| Total votes | | 205,531 | 100 |
| Republican hold | | | |

=== District 27 ===
1992 Texas's 27th congressional district election
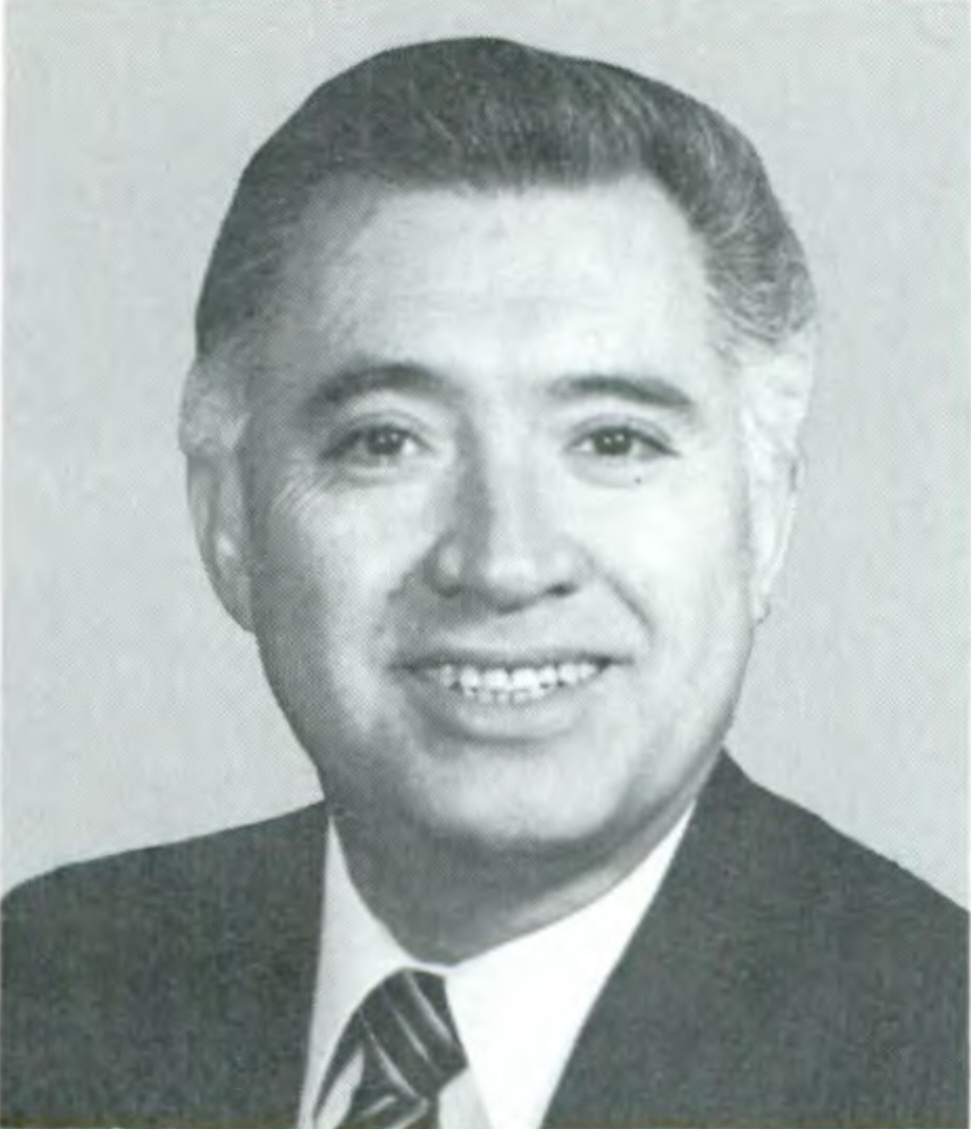

| Nominee | Solomon Ortiz | Tanya Lloyd |
| Party | Democratic | Republican |
| Popular vote | 87,022 | 66,853 |
| Percentage | 55.5% | 42.6% |
- County results Ortiz: 50–60% 60–70%
U.S. Representative before election
Solomon Ortiz
Democratic
Elected U.S. Representative
Solomon Ortiz
Democratic

Incumbent Democrat Solomon Ortiz ran for re-election.

Texas's 27th congressional district, 1992
| Party | Candidate | Votes | % |
|---|---|---|---|
| Democratic | Solomon Ortiz (incumbent) | 87,022 | 55.48 |
| Republican | Jay Kimbrough | 66,853 | 42.62 |
| Libertarian | Charles Henry Schoonover | 2,969 | 1.89 |
| Total votes | | 156,844 | 100 |
| Democratic hold | | | |

=== District 28 ===
District 28 was created as a result of redistricting after the 1990 census.

Texas's 28th congressional district, 1992
| Party | Candidate | Votes | % |
|---|---|---|---|
| Democratic | Frank Tejeda | 122,457 | 87.11 |
| Libertarian | David Slatter | 18,128 | 12.89 |
| Total votes | | 140,585 | 100 |
| Democratic win (new seat) | | | |

=== District 29 ===
District 29 was created as a result of redistricting after the 1990 census. The district was intentionally drawn to have a Hispanic majority population, but the methods used to draw this district would be found unconstitutional by the Supreme Court case Bush v. Vera in 1996.

Texas's 29th congressional district, 1992
| Party | Candidate | Votes | % |
|---|---|---|---|
| Democratic | Gene Green | 64,064 | 64.93 |
| Republican | Clark Kent Ervin | 34,609 | 35.07 |
| Total votes | | 98,673 | 100 |
| Democratic win (new seat) | | | |

=== District 30 ===
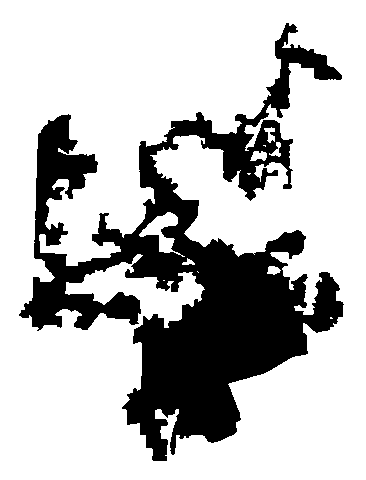
Outline of Texas' 30th Congressional District in 1992.

District 30 was created as a result of redistricting after the 1990 census. The district was intentionally drawn to have an African-American majority population, but the methods used to draw this district would be found unconstitutional by the Supreme Court case Bush v. Vera in 1996. State Senator Eddie Bernice Johnson, the first African American woman ever elected to public office from Dallas, ran in the open race.

Texas's 30th congressional district, 1992
| Party | Candidate | Votes | % |
|---|---|---|---|
| Democratic | Eddie Bernice Johnson | 107,831 | 71.53 |
| Republican | Lucy Cain | 37,853 | 25.11 |
| Libertarian | Ken Ashby | 5,063 | 3.36 |
| Total votes | | 150,747 | 100 |
| Democratic win (new seat) | | | |
