= 1994 United States House of Representatives elections in Texas =

- November 8, 1994

All 30 Texas seats to the United States House of Representatives
	Majority party	Minority party
Party	Democratic	Republican
Last election	21	9
Seats won	19	11
Seat change	▼2	▲2
Popular vote	1,734,163	2,294,222
Percentage	42.09%	55.68%
Swing	▼7.8%	▲7.9%
Democratic
50–60%
60–70%
70–80%
Republican
50–60%
60–70%
70–80%
80–90%
90>%

The 1994 United States House of Representatives elections in Texas occurred on November 8, 1994, to elect the members of the state of Texas's delegation to the United States House of Representatives. Texas had thirty seats in the House, apportioned according to the 1990 United States census.

In early 1994, several Republicans sued the state alleging that District 18 and District 29 were racially gerrymandered. District 30 was later added to the case, and in August, a federal judicial panel ordered the state to redraw its congressional districts. A separate panel later allowed the struck districts to be used for the 1994 elections, but it ordered the state to redraw its districts before the 1996 elections. This decision was later appealed and became the Supreme Court case Bush v. Vera.

These elections occurred simultaneously with the United States Senate elections of 1994, the United States House elections in other states, and various state and local elections.

Amidst the Republican Revolution, in which the Republican Party took control of the U.S. House for the first time since 1952, Republicans gained two seats in the U.S. House of Representatives from Texas and won the statewide popular vote, but Democrats maintained their majority of Texas seats due to redistricting.

== Overview ==
1994 United States House of Representatives elections in Texas
Party	Votes	Percentage	Seats before	Seats after	+/–
Republican	2,294,222	55.68%	9	11	+2
Democratic	1,734,163	42.09%	21	19	-2
Libertarian	35,889	0.87%	0	0	-
Independent	55,786	1.35%	0	0	-
Totals	4,120,060	100.00%	30	30	—

== Congressional districts ==
=== District 1 ===
1994 Texas's 1st congressional district election
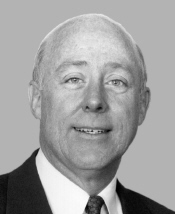

Nominee	Jim Chapman	Mike Blankenship
Party	Democratic	Republican
Popular vote	86,480	63,911
Percentage	55.3%	40.9%
- County results Chapman: 40–50% 50–60% 60–70% Blankenship: 50–60%
U.S. Representative before election
Jim Chapman
Democratic
Elected U.S. Representative
Jim Chapman
Democratic

Incumbent Democrat Jim Chapman ran for re-election.

Texas's 1st congressional district, 1994
Party	Candidate	Votes	%
Democratic	Jim Chapman (incumbent)	86,480	55.30
Republican	Mike Blankenship	63,911	40.87
Independent	Jefferson Mosser	6,001	3.84
Total votes		156,392	100
Democratic hold			

=== District 2 ===
1994 Texas's 2nd congressional district election
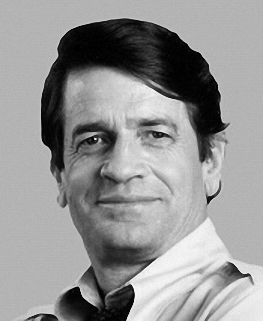

Nominee	Charlie Wilson	Donna Peterson
Party	Democratic	Republican
Popular vote	87,709	66,071
Percentage	57.04%	42.96%
- County results Wilson: 50–60% 60–70% 70–80% Peterson: 50–60%
U.S. Representative before election
Charlie Wilson
Democratic
Elected U.S. Representative
Charlie Wilson
Democratic

Incumbent Democrat Charlie Wilson ran for re-election.

Texas's 2nd congressional district, 1994
Party	Candidate	Votes	%
Democratic	Charlie Wilson (incumbent)	87,709	57.04
Republican	Donna Peterson	66,071	42.96
Total votes		153,780	100
Democratic hold			

=== District 3 ===
Incumbent Republican Sam Johnson ran for re-election.

Texas's 3rd congressional district, 1994
Party	Candidate	Votes	%
Republican	Sam Johnson (incumbent)	157,011	90.96
Libertarian	Tom Donahue	15,611	9.04
Total votes		172,622	100
Republican hold			

=== District 4 ===
1994 Texas' 4th congressional district election
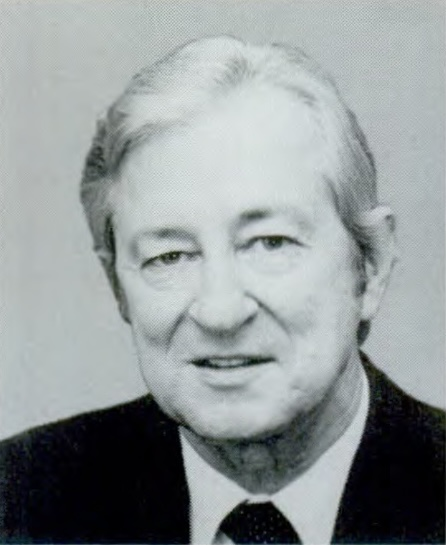

Nominee	Ralph Hall	David Bridges
Party	Democratic	Republican
Popular vote	99,303	67,267
Percentage	58.8%	39.8%
- County results Hall: 40–50% 50–60% 60–70% 70–80% Bridges: 60–70%
U.S. Representative before election
Ralph Hall
Democratic
Elected U.S. Representative
Ralph Hall
Democratic

Incumbent Democrat Ralph Hall ran for re-election.

Texas's 4th congressional district, 1994
Party	Candidate	Votes	%
Democratic	Ralph M. Hall (incumbent)	99,303	58.78
Republican	David Bridges	67,267	39.82
Libertarian	Jefferson Mosser	2,377	1.41
Total votes		168,947	100
Democratic hold			

=== District 5 ===
1994 Texas' 5th congressional district election
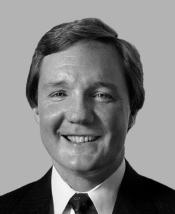

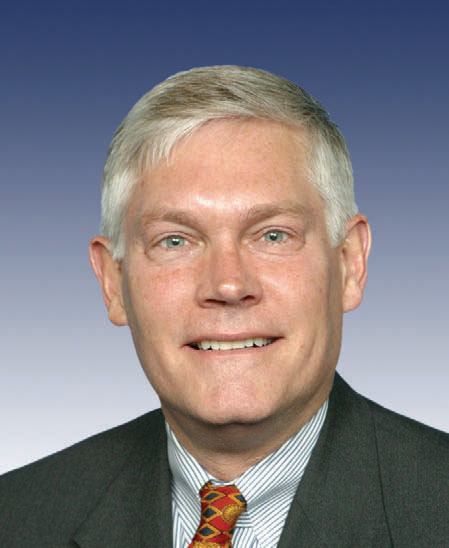
Nominee	John Wiley Bryant	Pete Sessions
Party	Democratic	Republican
Popular vote	61,877	58,521
Percentage	50.1%	47.3%
- County results Bryant: 50–60% 60–70% 70–80% Sessions: 50–60% 60–70%
U.S. Representative before election
John Wiley Bryant
Democratic
Elected U.S. Representative
John Wiley Bryant
Democratic

Incumbent Democrat John Wiley Bryant ran for re-election.

Texas's 5th congressional district, 1994
Party	Candidate	Votes	%
Democratic	John Wiley Bryant (incumbent)	61,877	50.06
Republican	Pete Sessions	58,521	47.34
Independent	Barbara Morgan	1,715	1.39
Libertarian	Noel Kopala	876	0.71
Independent	Regina Arashvand	627	0.51
Total votes		123,616	100
Democratic hold			

=== District 6 ===
Incumbent Republican Joe Barton ran for re-election.

Texas's 6th congressional district, 1994
Party	Candidate	Votes	%
Republican	Joe Barton (incumbent)	152,038	75.64
Democratic	Terry Jesmore	44,286	22.03
Libertarian	Bill Baird	4,688	2.33
Total votes		201,012	100
Republican hold			

=== District 7 ===
Incumbent Republican Bill Archer ran for re-election unopposed.

Texas's 7th congressional district, 1994
Party	Candidate	Votes	%
Republican	Bill Archer (incumbent)	116,873	100.00
Total votes		116,873	100
Republican hold			

=== District 8 ===
Incumbent Republican Jack Fields ran for re-election.

Texas's 8th congressional district, 1994
Party	Candidate	Votes	%
Republican	Jack Fields (incumbent)	148,473	92.05
Independent	Russ Klecka	12,831	7.95
Total votes		161,304	100
Republican hold			

=== District 9 ===
1994 Texas's 9th congressional district election
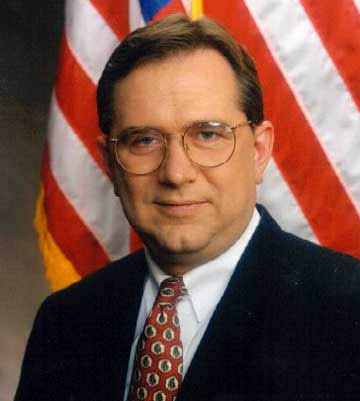

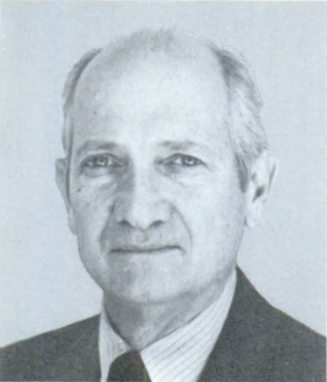
Nominee	Steve Stockman	Jack Brooks
Party	Republican	Democratic
Popular vote	81,353	71,643
Percentage	51.9%	45.7%
- County results Stockman: 50–60% 60–70% Brooks: 50–60%
U.S. Representative before election
Jack Brooks
Democratic
Elected U.S. Representative
Steve Stockman
Republican

Incumbent Democrat Jack Brooks ran for re-election. Republican Steve Stockman, who had lost to Brooks in 1992, defeated the 42-year incumbent as suburban Republican voters came to increasingly dominate the district.

Texas's 9th congressional district, 1994
Party	Candidate	Votes	%
Republican	Steve Stockman	81,353	51.88
Democratic	Jack Brooks (incumbent)	71,643	45.69
Independent	Bill Felton	2,145	1.37
Libertarian	Darla Beenau	1,656	1.06
Total votes		156,797	100.00
Republican gain from Democratic			

=== District 10 ===
Incumbent Democrat J. J. Pickle opted to retire rather than run for re-election.

Texas's 10th congressional district, 1994
Party	Candidate	Votes	%
Democratic	Lloyd Doggett	113,738	56.31
Republican	Jo Baylor	80,382	39.80
Libertarian	Jeff Hill	2,953	1.46
Independent	Michael Brandes	2,579	1.28
Independent	Jeff Davis	2,334	1.16
Total votes		201,986	100
Democratic hold			

=== District 11 ===
1994 Texas's 11th congressional district election
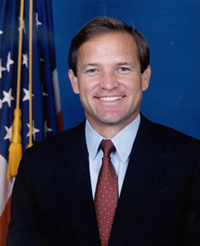

Nominee	Chet Edwards	Jim Broyles
Party	Democratic	Republican
Popular vote	76,667	52,876
Percentage	59.2%	40.8%
- County results Edwards: 50–60% 60–70%
U.S. Representative before election
Chet Edwards
Democratic
Elected U.S. Representative
Chet Edwards
Democratic

Incumbent Democrat Chet Edwards ran for re-election.

Texas's 11th congressional district, 1994
Party	Candidate	Votes	%
Democratic	Chet Edwards (incumbent)	76,667	59.18
Republican	Jim Broyles	52,876	40.82
Total votes		129,543	100
Democratic hold			

=== District 12 ===
Incumbent Democrat Pete Geren ran for re-election.

Texas's 12th congressional district, 1994
Party	Candidate	Votes	%
Democratic	Pete Geren (incumbent)	96,372	68.67
Republican	Ernest Anderson	43,959	31.33
Total votes		140,331	100
Democratic hold			

=== District 13 ===
1994 Texas's 13th congressional district election
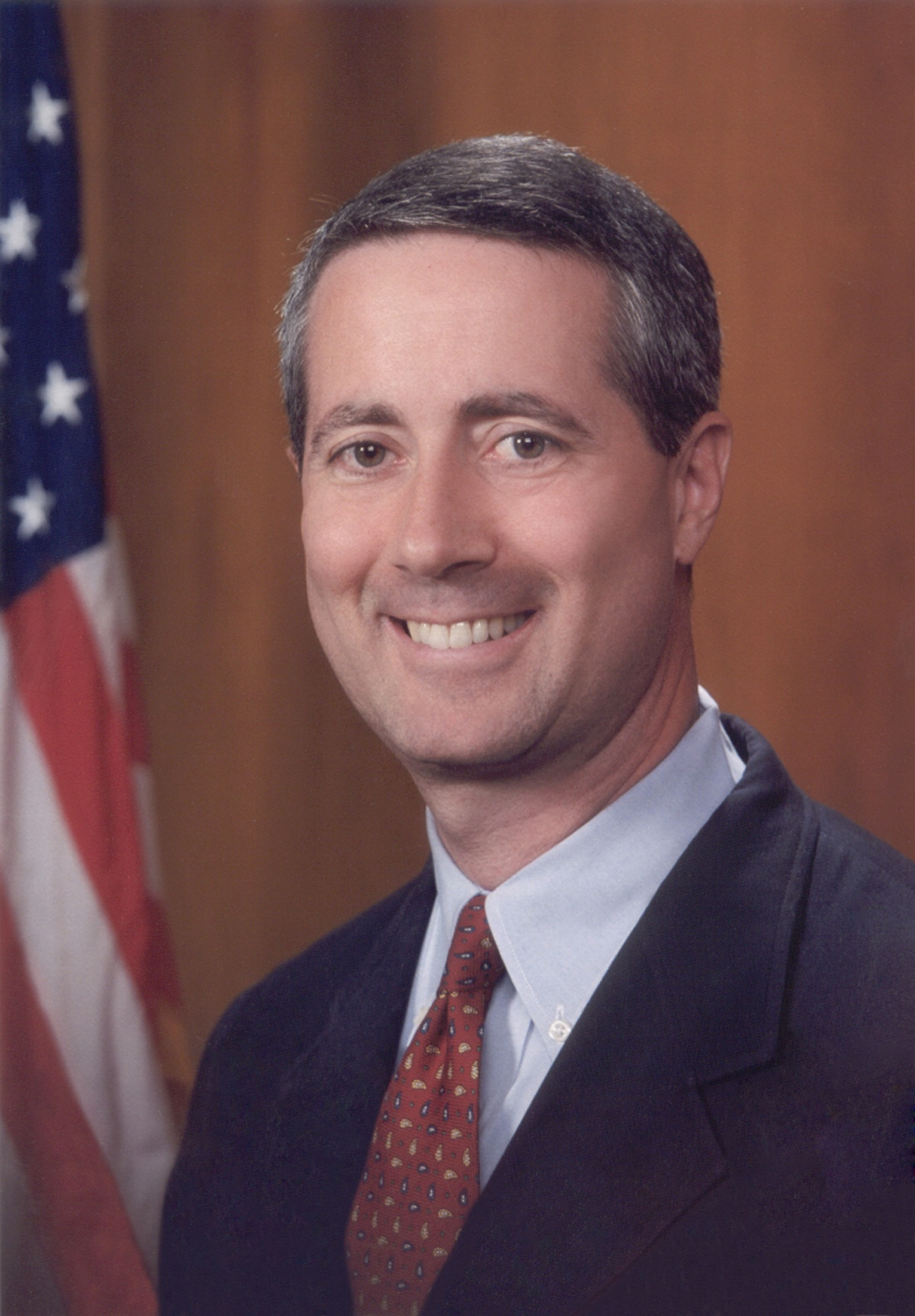

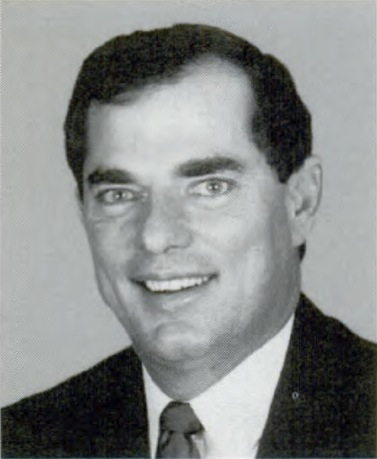
Nominee	Mac Thornberry	Bill Sarpalius
Party	Republican	Democratic
Popular vote	79,466	63,923
Percentage	55.4%	44.6%
- County results Thornberry: 50–60% 60–70% 70–80% Sarpalius: 50–60% 60–70% 70–80%
U.S. Representative before election
Bill Sarpalius
Democratic
Elected U.S. Representative
Mac Thornberry
Republican

Incumbent Democrat Bill Sarpalius ran for re-election, but was defeated by Mac Thornberry.

Texas's 13th congressional district, 1994
Party	Candidate	Votes	%
Republican	Mac Thornberry	79,466	55.42
Democratic	Bill Sarpalius (incumbent)	63,923	44.58
Total votes		143,389	100.00
Republican gain from Democratic			

=== District 14 ===
1994 Texas's 14th congressional district election
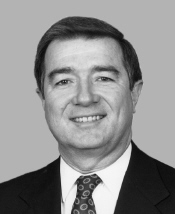

Nominee	Greg Laughlin	Jim Deats
Party	Democratic	Republican
Popular vote	86,175	68,793
Percentage	55.6%	44.4%
- County results Laughlin: 50–60% 60–70% Deats: 50–60% 60–70%
U.S. Representative before election
Greg Laughlin
Democratic
Elected U.S. Representative
Greg Laughlin
Democratic

Incumbent Democrat Greg Laughlin ran for re-election.

Texas's 14th congressional district, 1994
Party	Candidate	Votes	%
Democratic	Greg Laughlin (incumbent)	86,175	55.61
Republican	Jim Deats	68,793	44.39
Total votes		154,968	100
Democratic hold			

=== District 15 ===
Incumbent Democrat Kika de la Garza ran for re-election.

Texas's 15th congressional district, 1994
Party	Candidate	Votes	%
Democratic	Kika de la Garza (incumbent)	61,527	58.95
Republican	Tom Haughey	41,119	39.40
Libertarian	John Hamilton	1,720	1.65
Total votes		104,366	100
Democratic hold			

=== District 16 ===
Incumbent Democrat Ronald D. Coleman ran for re-election.

Texas's 16th congressional district, 1994
Party	Candidate	Votes	%
Democratic	Ronald D. Coleman (incumbent)	49,815	57.11
Republican	Bobby Ortiz	37,409	42.89
Total votes		87,224	100
Democratic hold			

=== District 17 ===
1994 Texas's 17th congressional district election
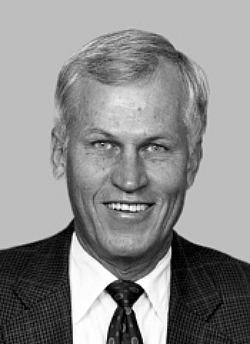

Nominee	Charles Stenholm	Phil Boone
Party	Democratic	Republican
Popular vote	83,497	72,108
Percentage	53.7%	46.3%
- County results Stenholm: 50–60% 60–70% 70–80% 80–90% Boone: 50–60%
U.S. Representative before election
Charles Stenholm
Democratic
Elected U.S. Representative
Charles Stenholm
Democratic

Incumbent Democrat Charles Stenholm ran for re-election.

Texas's 17th congressional district, 1994
Party	Candidate	Votes	%
Democratic	Charles Stenholm (incumbent)	83,497	53.66
Republican	Phil Boone	72,108	46.34
Total votes		155,605	100
Democratic hold			

=== District 18 ===
Incumbent Democrat Craig Washington ran for re-election. He was defeated in the Democratic primary by Houston City Councilor Sheila Jackson Lee.

Texas's 18th congressional district, 1994
Party	Candidate	Votes	%
Democratic	Sheila Jackson Lee	84,790	73.48
Republican	Jerry Burley	28,153	24.40
Independent	J. Larry Snellings	1,278	1.11
Libertarian	George Hollenbeck	1,169	1.01
Total votes		115,390	100
Democratic hold			

=== District 19 ===
Incumbent Republican Larry Combest ran for re-election unopposed.

Texas's 19th congressional district, 1994
Party	Candidate	Votes	%
Republican	Larry Combest (incumbent)	120,641	100.00
Total votes		120,641	100
Republican hold			

=== District 20 ===
Incumbent Democrat Henry B. González ran for re-election.

Texas's 20th congressional district, 1994
Party	Candidate	Votes	%
Democratic	Henry B. Gonzalez (incumbent)	60,114	62.52
Republican	Carl Bill Colyer	36,035	37.48
Total votes		96,149	100
Democratic hold			

=== District 21 ===
Incumbent Republican Lamar Smith ran for re-election.

Texas's 21st congressional district, 1994
Party	Candidate	Votes	%
Republican	Lamar Smith (incumbent)	165,595	89.96
Independent	Kerry Lowry	18,480	10.04
Total votes		184,075	100
Republican hold			

=== District 22 ===
Incumbent Republican Tom DeLay ran for re-election.

Texas's 22nd congressional district, 1994
Party	Candidate	Votes	%
Republican	Tom DeLay (incumbent)	120,302	73.74
Democratic	Scott Douglas Cunningham	38,826	23.80
Independent	Gregory Pepper	4,016	2.46
Total votes		163,144	100
Republican hold			

=== District 23 ===
1994 Texas's 23rd congressional district election
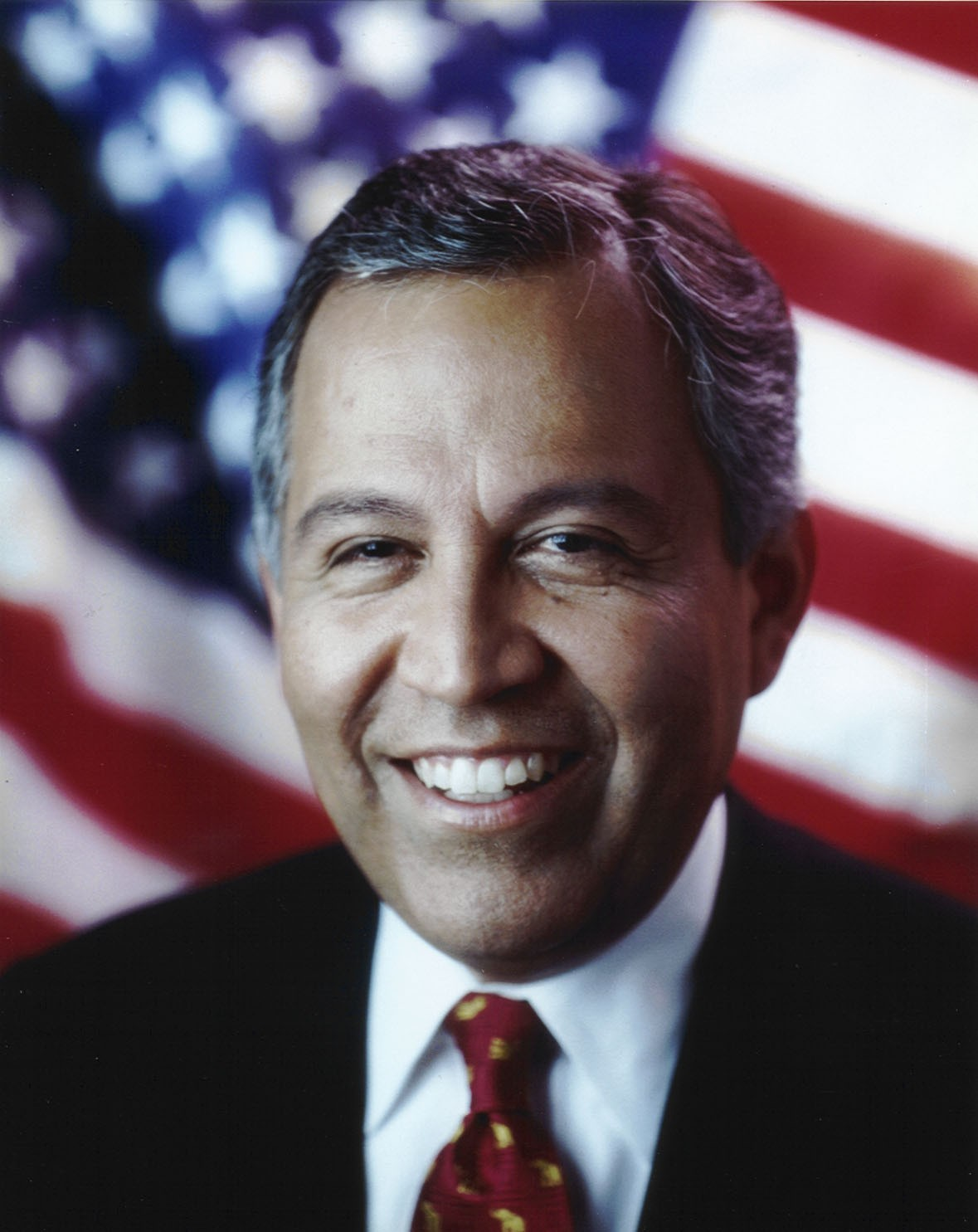

Nominee	Henry Bonilla	Rolando Rios
Party	Republican	Democratic
Popular vote	73,815	44,101
Percentage	62.6%	37.4%
- County results Bonilla: 50–60% 60–70% 70–80% 80–90% Rios: 50–60% 60–70%
U.S. Representative before election
Henry Bonilla
Republican
Elected U.S. Representative
Henry Bonilla
Republican

Incumbent Republican Henry Bonilla ran for re-election.

Texas's 23rd congressional district, 1994
Party	Candidate	Votes	%
Republican	Henry Bonilla (incumbent)	73,815	62.60
Democratic	Rolando Rios	44,101	37.40
Total votes		117,916	100
Republican hold			

=== District 24 ===
Incumbent Democrat Martin Frost ran for re-election.

Texas's 24th congressional district, 1994
Party	Candidate	Votes	%
Democratic	Martin Frost (incumbent)	65,019	52.83
Republican	Ed Harrison	58,062	47.17
Total votes		123,081	100
Democratic hold			

=== District 25 ===
1994 Texas's 25th congressional district election
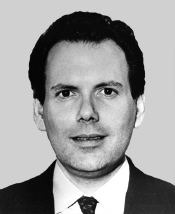

Nominee	Ken Bentsen	Gene Fontenot
Party	Democratic	Republican
Popular vote	61,959	53,321
Percentage	52.3%	45.0%
- County results Bentsen: 40–50% 70–80%
U.S. Representative before election
Michael A. Andrews
Democratic
Elected U.S. Representative
Ken Bentsen
Democratic

Incumbent Democrat Michael A. Andrews retired to run for U.S. senator. Despite the national Republican wave, Democrat Ken Bentsen, the nephew of Treasury Secretary and former U.S. Senator Lloyd Bentsen, defeated businessman Gene Fontenot in the open race. The race was the most expensive U.S. House race in Texas history; Fontenot had outspent Bentsen four to one.

Texas's 25th congressional district, 1994
Party	Candidate	Votes	%
Democratic	Ken Bentsen	61,959	52.27
Republican	Gene Fontenot	53,321	44.99
Independent	Sarah Klein-Tower	2,060	1.74
Libertarian	Robert Lockhart	1,189	1.00
Total votes		118,529	100
Democratic hold			

=== District 26 ===
Incumbent Republican Dick Armey ran for re-election. He became the first Texas Republican to be elected majority leader of the U.S. House of Representatives.

Texas's 26th congressional district, 1994
Party	Candidate	Votes	%
Republican	Dick Armey (incumbent)	135,398	76.41
Democratic	LeEarl Ann Bryant	39,763	22.44
Libertarian	Alfred Adask	2,030	1.15
Total votes		177,191	100
Republican hold			

=== District 27 ===
Incumbent Democrat Solomon Ortiz ran for re-election.

Texas's 27th congressional district, 1994
Party	Candidate	Votes	%
Democratic	Solomon Ortiz (incumbent)	65,325	59.38
Republican	Erol Stone	44,693	40.62
Total votes		110,018	100
Democratic hold			

=== District 28 ===
1994 Texas's 28th congressional district election
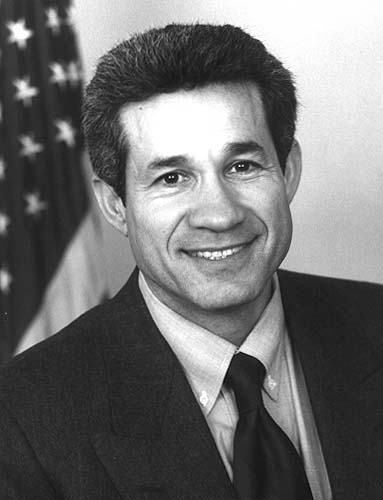

Nominee	Frank Tejeda	David Slatter
Party	Democratic	Republican
Popular vote	73,986	28,777
Percentage	70.9%	27.6%
- County results Tejeda: 50–60% 60–70% 70–80% 80–90% Slatter: 50–60%
U.S. Representative before election
Frank Tejeda
Democratic
Elected U.S. Representative
Frank Tejeda
Democratic

Incumbent Democrat Frank Tejeda ran for re-election.

Texas's 28th congressional district, 1994
Party	Candidate	Votes	%
Democratic	Frank Tejeda (incumbent)	73,986	70.88
Republican	David Slatter	28,777	27.57
Libertarian	Steve Rothstein	1,612	1.54
Total votes		104,375	100
Democratic hold			

=== District 29 ===
Incumbent Democrat Gene Green ran for re-election.

Texas's 29th congressional district, 1994
Party	Candidate	Votes	%
Democratic	Gene Green (incumbent)	44,102	73.44
Republican	Oilman Eide	15,952	26.56
Total votes		60,054	100
Democratic hold			

=== District 30 ===
Incumbent Democrat Eddie Bernice Johnson ran for re-election.

Texas's 30th congressional district, 1994
Party	Candidate	Votes	%
Democratic	Eddie Bernice Johnson (incumbent)	73,166	72.63
Republican	Lucy Cain	25,848	25.66
Libertarian	Ken Ashby	1,728	1.72
Total votes		100,742	100
Democratic hold			
