= Texas's 13th congressional district =

U.S. House district for Texas

Coordinates: 34°50′16″N 100°35′52″W

- Interactive map of district boundaries
- Representative: Ronny Jackson; R–Amarillo
- Distribution: 68.88% urban; 31.12% rural
- Population (2025): 801,971
- Median household income: $73,772
- Ethnicity: 58.1% White; 28.2% Hispanic; 6.5% Black; 3.8% Two or more races; 2.5% Asian; 1.0% other
- Cook PVI: R+24

Texas's 13th congressional district is a congressional district in the U.S. state of Texas that includes most of the Texas Panhandle, parts of Texoma and northwestern parts of North Texas. The principal cities in the district are Amarillo, Gainesville and Wichita Falls. It winds across the Panhandle into the South Plains, then runs east across the Red River Valley. Covering over 40,000 square miles (100,000 km^{2}), it is the 19th-largest district by area in the nation, the 14th-largest that does not cover an entire state, as well as the second-largest in Texas behind the 23rd congressional district. After the 2020 census was completed, the 13th district was heavily redrawn to incorporate most of Denton, an increasingly Democratic-leaning suburb of the Dallas-Fort Worth metroplex which had previously anchored the 26th district. With a Cook Partisan Voting Index rating of R+24, it is one of the most Republican districts in Texas.

The district has been represented in the United States House of Representatives by Republican Ronny Jackson since 2021, and previously by Republican Mac Thornberry, from 1995 until his decision not to run for reelection in 2020. The district's current configuration dates from 1973, when the Panhandle-based 18th district was merged with the Texoma-based 13th. The merged district contained more of the old 18th's territory.

The Panhandle had been one of the first areas of Texas to break away from a Solid South voting pattern. While the region's voters began splitting their tickets as early as the 1940s (and actually elected a Republican during a 1950 special election), Democrats continued to hold most local offices, as well as most of the area's seats in the state legislature, well into the 1990s. As late as 1976, Jimmy Carter won 33 of the 44 counties in the district, getting 60% to 70% of the vote in many of them.

Since Thornberry's ouster of three-term Democrat Bill Sarpalius in 1994, however, a Democrat has only crossed the 30 percent mark in 1996, 1998 and 2000. Republicans now dominate at nearly every level of government, routinely winning by landslide margins when they face any opposition at all. By the turn of the millennium, there were almost no elected Democrats left above the county level.

In 2012, Barack Obama took just 18.5% of the vote in the 13th, his lowest percentage of any congressional district in the nation. In 2016, it was Hillary Clinton's second largest margin of defeat in a congressional district after Alabama's 4th. She received an even lower percentage than President Obama four years prior, gathering 16.9% of the vote compared to Donald Trump's 79.9%.

== Recent election results from statewide races ==
=== 2023–2027 boundaries ===
Year	Office	Results
2008	President	McCain 73% - 26%
2012	President	Romney 77% - 23%
2014	Senate	Cornyn 82% - 18%
2014	Governor	Abbott 79% - 21%
2016	President	Trump 73% - 22%
2018	Senate	Cruz 71% - 28%
2018	Governor	Abbott 74% - 24%
2018	Lt. Governor	Patrick 69% - 28%
2018	Attorney General	Paxton 71% - 27%
2018	Comptroller of Public Accounts	Hegar 72% - 24%
2020	President	Trump 72% - 26%
2020	Senate	Cornyn 73% - 25%
2022	Governor	Abbott 75% - 24%
2022	Lt. Governor	Patrick 73% - 24%
2022	Attorney General	Paxton 73% - 24%
2022	Comptroller of Public Accounts	Hegar 75% - 23%
2024	President	Trump 73% - 26%
2024	Senate	Cruz 71% - 27%

=== 2027–2033 boundaries ===
Year	Office	Results
2008	President	McCain 72% - 26%
2012	President	Romney 77% - 23%
2014	Senate	Cornyn 81% - 19%
2014	Governor	Abbott 78% - 22%
2016	President	Trump 73% - 23%
2018	Senate	Cruz 71% - 29%
2018	Governor	Abbott 73% - 25%
2018	Lt. Governor	Patrick 68% - 29%
2018	Attorney General	Paxton 70% - 28%
2018	Comptroller of Public Accounts	Hegar 72% - 25%
2020	President	Trump 71% - 27%
2020	Senate	Cornyn 72% - 25%
2022	Governor	Abbott 74% - 25%
2022	Lt. Governor	Patrick 72% - 25%
2022	Attorney General	Paxton 72% - 25%
2022	Comptroller of Public Accounts	Hegar 74% - 23%
2024	President	Trump 73% - 26%
2024	Senate	Cruz 70% - 28%
2026	Senate	Paxton 60% - 37%
2026	Governor	Abbott 63% - 35%

== Current composition ==
For the 118th and successive Congresses (based on redistricting following the 2020 census), the district contains all or portions of the following counties and communities:

Archer County (6)

All 6 communities

Armstrong County (2)

Claude, Washburn

Baylor County (1)

Seymour

Briscoe County (2)

Quitaque, Silverton

Carson County (4)

All 4 communities

Childress County (1)

Childress

Clay County (6)

All 6 communities

Collingsworth County (4)

All 4 communities

Cottle County (1)

Paducah

Dallam County (2)

Dalhart (shared with Hartley County), Texline

Deaf Smith County (1)

Hereford

Denton County (2)

Denton (part; also 26th), Krum

Dickens County (2)

Dickens, Spur

Donley County (4)

All 4 communities

Foard County (1)

Crowell

Gray County (4)

All 4 communities

Hall County (4)

All 4 communities

Hansford County (3)

All 3 communities

Hardeman County (2)

Chillicothe, Quanah

Hartley County (3)

All 3 communities

Hemphill County (2)

Canadian, Glazier

Hutchinson County (5)

All 5 communities

King County (1)

Guthrie

Knox County (4)

All 4 communities

Lipscomb County (5)

All 5 communities

Montague County (7)

All 7 communities

Moore County (3)

All 3 communities

Motley County (2)

Matador, Roaring Springs

Ochiltree County (3)

All 3 communities

Oldham County (4)

All 4 communities

Potter County (3)

All 3 communities

Randall County (8)

All 8 communities

Roberts County (1)

Miami

Sherman County (2)

Stratford, Texhoma

Wheeler County (4)

All 4 communities

Wichita County (6)

All 6 communities

Wilbarger County (4)

All 4 communities

Wise County (6)

Alvord, Bridgeport, Chico, Decatur (part; also 26th), Lake Bridgeport, Runaway Bay

== Future composition ==
Beginning with the 2026 election, the 13 district will consist of the following counties:

- Archer
- Armstrong
- Baylor
- Briscoe
- Carson
- Childress
- Clay
- Collingsworth
- Cottle
- Dallam
- Deaf Smith
- Denton (part)
- Dickens
- Donley
- Foard
- Gray
- Hall
- Hansford
- Hardeman
- Hartley
- Hemphill
- Hutchinson
- King
- Knox
- Lipscomb
- Montague
- Moore
- Motley
- Ochiltree
- Oldham
- Potter
- Randall
- Roberts
- Sherman
- Wheeler
- Wichita
- Wilbarger
- Wise (part)

== List of members representing the district ==
Member	Party	Term	Cong ress	Election history
District established March 4, 1893
Jeremiah V. Cockrell (Anson)	Democratic	March 4, 1893 – March 3, 1897	53rd 54th	Elected in 1892. Re-elected in 1894. [data missing]
John H. Stephens (Vernon)	Democratic	March 4, 1897 – March 3, 1917	55th 56th 57th 58th 59th 60th 61st 62nd 63rd 64th	Elected in 1896. Re-elected in 1898. Re-elected in 1900. Re-elected in 1902. Re-elected in 1904. Re-elected in 1906. Re-elected in 1908. Re-elected in 1910. Re-elected in 1912. Re-elected in 1914. [data missing]
J. Marvin Jones (Amarillo)	Democratic	March 4, 1917 – March 3, 1919	65th	Elected in 1916. Redistricted to the 18th district.
Lucian W. Parrish (Henrietta)	Democratic	March 4, 1919 – March 27, 1922	66th 67th	Elected in 1918. Re-elected in 1920. Died.
Vacant		March 27, 1922 – May 22, 1922	67th	
Guinn Williams (Decatur)	Democratic	May 22, 1922 – March 3, 1933	67th 68th 69th 70th 71st 72nd	Elected to finish Parrish's term. Re-elected in 1922. Re-elected in 1924. Re-elected in 1926. Re-elected in 1928. Re-elected in 1930. [data missing]
William D. McFarlane (Graham)	Democratic	March 4, 1933 – January 3, 1939	73rd 74th 75th	Elected in 1932. Re-elected in 1934. Re-elected in 1936. [data missing]
Ed Gossett (Wichita Falls)	Democratic	January 3, 1939 – July 31, 1951	76th 77th 78th 79th 80th 81st 82nd	Elected in 1938. Re-elected in 1940. Re-elected in 1942. Re-elected in 1944. Re-elected in 1946. Re-elected in 1948. Re-elected in 1950. Resigned.
Vacant		July 31, 1951 – September 8, 1951	82nd	
Frank N. Ikard (Wichita Falls)	Democratic	September 8, 1951 – December 15, 1961	82nd 83rd 84th 85th 86th 87th	Elected to finish Gossett's term. Re-elected in 1952. Re-elected in 1954. Re-elected in 1956. Re-elected in 1958. Re-elected in 1960. Resigned.
Vacant		December 15, 1961 – January 27, 1962	87th	
Graham B. Purcell Jr. (Wichita Falls)	Democratic	January 27, 1962 – January 3, 1973	87th 88th 89th 90th 91st 92nd	Elected to finish Ikard's term. Re-elected in 1962. Re-elected in 1964. Re-elected in 1966. Re-elected in 1968. Re-elected in 1970. Lost reelection after redistricting.
Bob Price (Pampa)	Republican	January 3, 1973 – January 3, 1975	93rd	Redistricted from the 18th district and re-elected in 1972. Lost reelection.
Jack Hightower (Vernon)	Democratic	January 3, 1975 – January 3, 1985	94th 95th 96th 97th 98th	Elected in 1974. Re-elected in 1976. Re-elected in 1978. Re-elected in 1980. Re-elected in 1982. Lost reelection.
Beau Boulter (Amarillo)	Republican	January 3, 1985 – January 3, 1989	99th 100th	Elected in 1984. Re-elected in 1986. Retired to run for U.S. Senator.
Bill Sarpalius (Amarillo)	Democratic	January 3, 1989 – January 3, 1995	101st 102nd 103rd	Elected in 1988. Re-elected in 1990. Re-elected in 1992. Lost reelection.
Mac Thornberry (Amarillo)	Republican	January 3, 1995 – January 3, 2021	104th 105th 106th 107th 108th 109th 110th 111th 112th 113th 114th 115th 116th	Elected in 1994. Reelected in 1996. Reelected in 1998. Reelected in 2000. Reelected in 2002. Reelected in 2004. Reelected in 2006. Reelected in 2008. Reelected in 2010. Reelected in 2012. Reelected in 2014. Reelected in 2016. Reelected in 2018. Retired.
Ronny Jackson (Amarillo)	Republican	January 3, 2021 – present	117th 118th 119th	Elected in 2020. Re-elected in 2022. Re-elected in 2024. Re-elected in 2026.

== Election results ==
Often in recent years, the incumbent has either run unopposed or has only a third/fourth party candidate who is opposing them. Generally, the incumbent gets over 70% of the vote, even during years with huge opposition party pickups.

Texas 13th congressional district 1994
Party	Candidate	Votes	%
Republican	Mac Thornberry	79,466	55.42
Democratic	Bill Sarpalius (incumbent)	63,923	44.58
Total votes		143,389	100.00

Texas 13th congressional district 1996
Party	Candidate	Votes	%
Republican	Mac Thornberry (incumbent)	116,098	66.87
Democratic	Samuel Brown Silverman	56,066	32.29
Independent	Don Harkey	1,463	0.84
Total votes		173,627	100.00

Texas 13th congressional district 1998
Party	Candidate	Votes	%
Republican	Mac Thornberry (incumbent)	81,141	67.92
Democratic	Mark Harmon	37,027	30.99
Libertarian	Georganne Baker Payne	1,298	1.09
Total votes		119,466	100.00

Texas 13th congressional district 2000
Party	Candidate	Votes	%
Republican	Mac Thornberry (incumbent)	117,995	67.63
Democratic	Curtis Clinesmith	54,343	31.15
Libertarian	Brad Clardy	2,137	1.22
Total votes		174,475	100.00

Texas 13th congressional district 2002
Party	Candidate	Votes	%
Republican	Mac Thornberry (incumbent)	119,401	79.27
Democratic	Zane Reese	31,218	20.73
Total votes		150,619	100.00

Texas 13th congressional district 2004
Party	Candidate	Votes	%
Republican	Mac Thornberry (incumbent)	189,448	92.31
Libertarian	John Robert Deek	15,793	7.69
Total votes		205,241	100.00

Texas 13th congressional district 2006
Party	Candidate	Votes	%
Republican	Mac Thornberry (incumbent)	108,107	74.35
Democratic	Roger J. Waun	33,460	23.01
Libertarian	Keith Dyer	3,829	2.63
Total votes		145,396	100.00

Texas 13th congressional district 2008
Party	Candidate	Votes	%
Republican	Mac Thornberry (incumbent)	180,078	77.65
Democratic	Roger James Waun	51,841	22.35
Total votes		231,919	100.00

Texas 13th congressional district 2010
Party	Candidate	Votes	%
Republican	Mac Thornberry (incumbent)	113,201	87.05
Independent	Keith Dyer	11,192	8.61
Libertarian	John T. Burwell Jr.	5,650	4.34
Total votes		130,043	100.00

Texas 13th congressional district 2012
Party	Candidate	Votes	%
Republican	Mac Thornberry (incumbent)	187,775	90.98
Libertarian	John Robert Deek	12,701	6.15
Green	Keith F. Houston	5,912	2.86
Total votes		206,388	100.00

Texas 13th congressional district 2014
Party	Candidate	Votes	%
Republican	Mac Thornberry (incumbent)	110,842	84.3
Democratic	Mike Minter	16,822	12.8
Libertarian	Emily Pivoda	2,863	2.2
Green	Don Cook	924	0.7
Total votes		131,451	100

Texas 13th congressional district 2016
Party	Candidate	Votes	%
Republican	Mac Thornberry (incumbent)	199,050	90.0
Libertarian	Calvin DeWeese	14,725	6.7
Green	H.F. "Rusty" Tomlinson	7,467	3.4
Total votes		221,242	100

Texas 13th congressional district 2018
Party	Candidate	Votes	%
Republican	Mac Thornberry (incumbent)	168,090	81.6
Democratic	Greg Sagan	34,859	16.9
Libertarian	Calvin DeWeese	3,144	1.5
Total votes		206,093	100

Texas 13th congressional district 2020
Party	Candidate	Votes	%
Republican	Ronny Jackson	217,124	79.4
Democratic	Gus Trujillo	50,477	18.5
Libertarian	Jack B. Westbrook	5,907	2.1
Total votes		273,508	100

Texas's 13th congressional district 2022
Party	Candidate	Votes	%
Republican	Ronny Jackson (incumbent)	161,767	75.3
Democratic	Kathleen Brown	52,910	24.6
Total votes		214,677	100

Texas's 13th congressional district 2024
Party	Candidate	Votes	%
Republican	Ronny Jackson (incumbent)	240,622	100.0
Total votes		240,622	100.0
Republican hold			

== Historical district boundaries ==
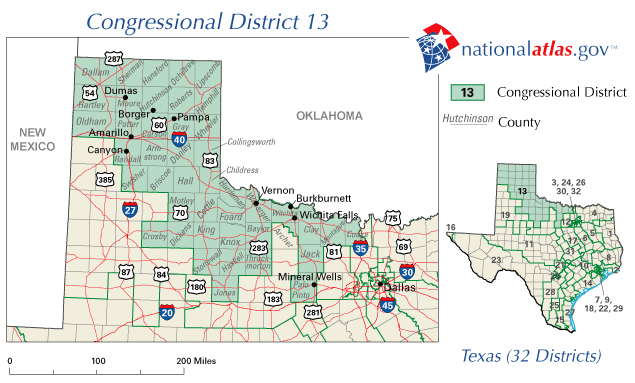
2007–2013

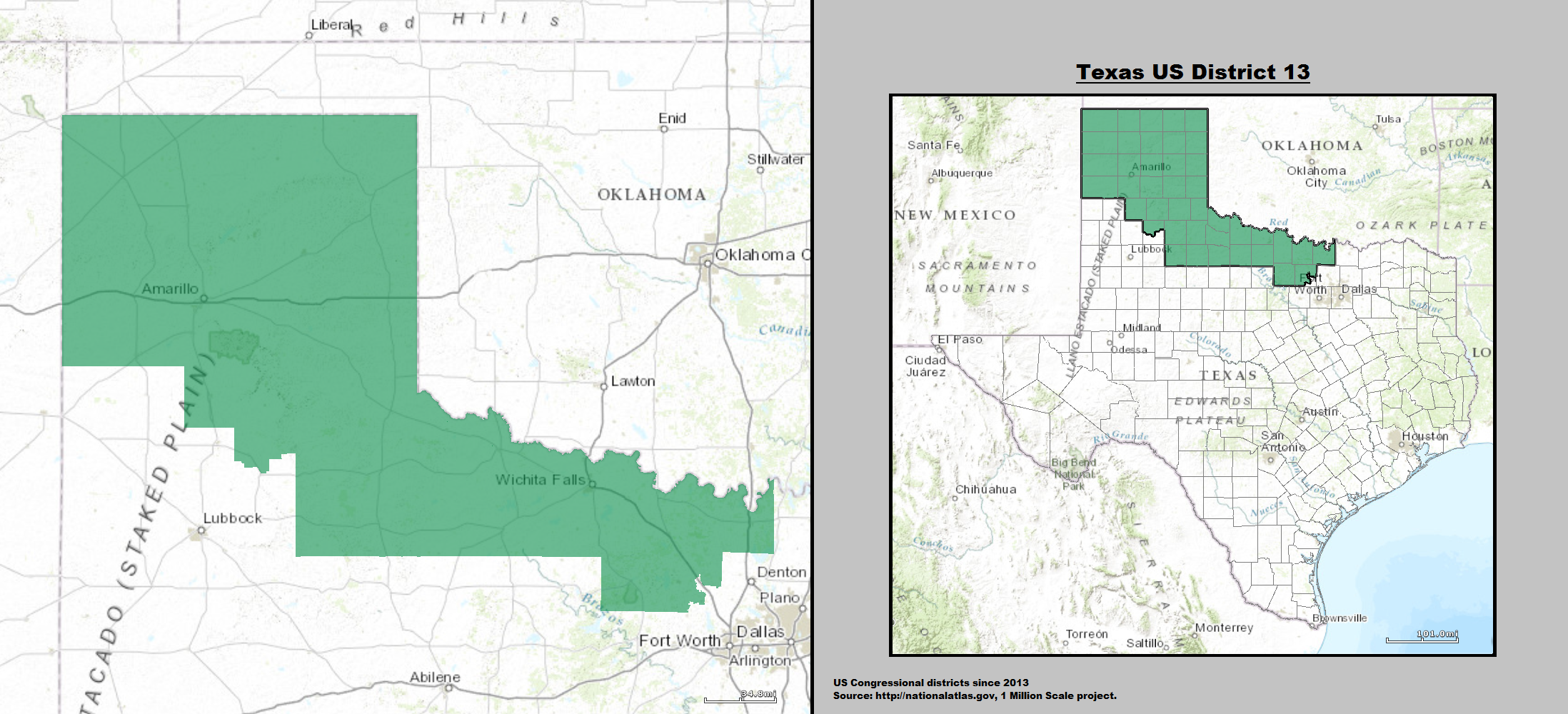
2013–2023

== See also ==
- List of United States congressional districts
