= Mac Thornberry =

American politician (born 1958)

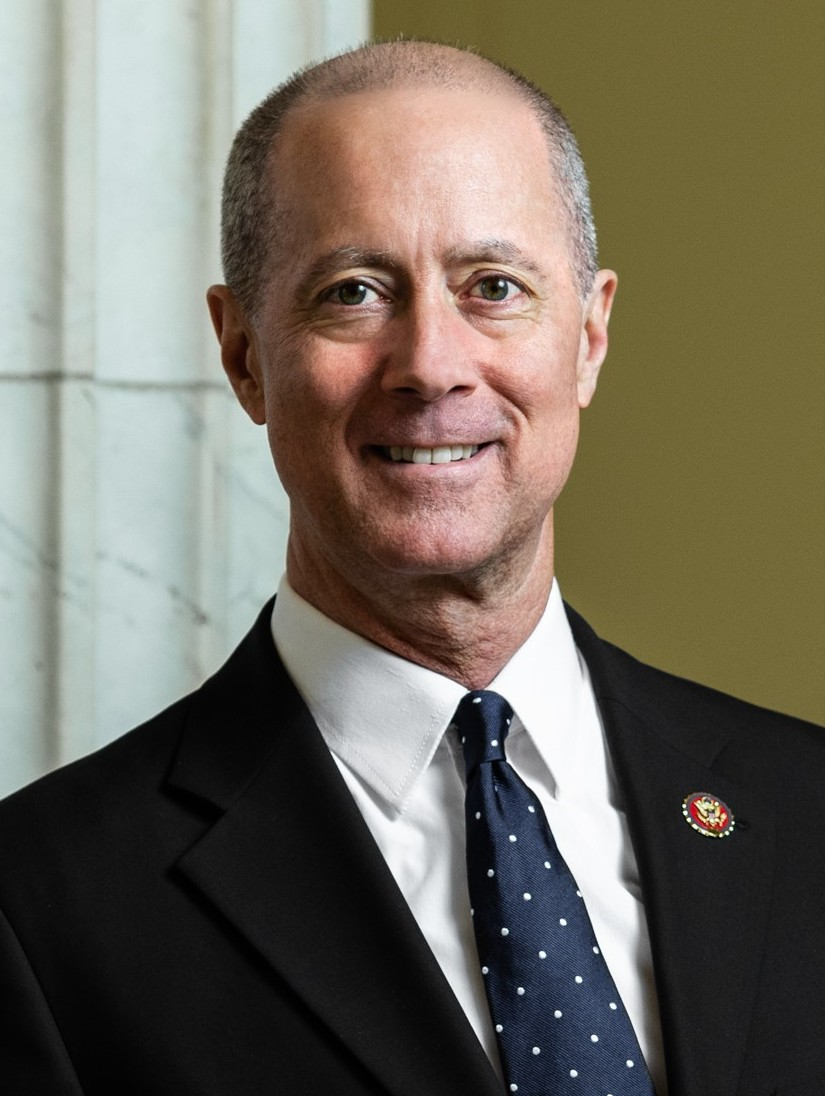
- Official portrait, 2020

Ranking Member of the House Armed Services Committee
- In office January 3, 2019 – January 3, 2021
- Preceded by: Adam Smith
- Succeeded by: Mike Rogers

Chair of the House Armed Services Committee
- In office January 3, 2015 – January 3, 2019
- Preceded by: Buck McKeon
- Succeeded by: Adam Smith

Member of the U.S. House of Representatives from Texas's 13th district
- In office January 3, 1995 – January 3, 2021
- Preceded by: Bill Sarpalius
- Succeeded by: Ronny Jackson

Personal details
- Born: William McClellan Thornberry; July 15, 1958 (age 68) Clarendon, Texas, U.S.
- Party: Republican
- Spouse: Sally Thornberry
- Education: Texas Tech University (BA); University of Texas, Austin (JD)
- Thornberry's voice Thornberry opposing a proposed Yemen war powers resolution. Recorded February 13, 2019

William McClellan "Mac" Thornberry (born July 15, 1958) is an American politician who served as the U.S. representative for Texas's 13th congressional district from 1995 to 2021. A member of the Republican Party, Thornberry represented the most Republican district in the United States by partisan voting index. The district covers the Texas Panhandle and stretched between the Oklahoma and New Mexico borders.

In September 2019, Thornberry announced that he would not run for reelection in 2020, and former Physician to the President Ronny Jackson was elected to succeed him.

== Early life, education, and career ==
In the 1880s, Thornberry's great-great-grandfather Amos Thornberry, a Union Army veteran, moved to Clay County, just east of Wichita Falls.

Thornberry is a lifelong resident of Clarendon, 60 miles (97 km) east of Amarillo in the heart of the 13th. His family has operated a ranch in the area since 1881. He received his Bachelor of Arts in history from Texas Tech University in Lubbock. He then obtained his Juris Doctor from the University of Texas School of Law in Austin.

He served as a staffer to two other Texas Republican congressmen, Tom Loeffler and Larry Combest, and as deputy assistant Secretary of State for Legislative Affairs under Ronald Reagan before joining his brothers on the family ranch. Thornberry has called President Reagan "...a great man and a great president, ranking in the top tier of all of our chief executives." He also practiced law in Amarillo.

Thornberry is a member of the Council on Foreign Relations.

== U.S. House of Representatives ==
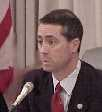
Thornberry in 2000

=== Committee assignments ===
Committee on Armed Services (Ranking Member)

Republican Study Committee

From 2015 to 2019, Thornberry served as chairman of the House Armed Services Committee, the first Texan of either party to hold this position. The committee oversees the Pentagon, all military services, and all Department of Defense agencies, including agency budgets and policies.

Thornberry lost his 2009 bid to chair the full Armed Services Committee to Buck McKeon, R-Calif., who had more seniority. He served as vice chair of the full committee during McKeon's time as chairman. After taking the committee gavel at the beginning of the 114th Congress, Thornberry spearheaded a major Department of Defense acquisition reform effort that received bipartisan and bicameral support from House Armed Services Committee Ranking Member Adam Smith (D-Wash.) and Senate Armed Services Committee Chairman John McCain (R-AZ).

Thornberry previously served on the United States House Permanent Select Committee on Intelligence.

On September 30, 2019, it was announced that Thornberry would not seek reelection in 2020.

== Tenure and political positions ==
According to the National Journal Congressional Almanac, "In the House, Thornberry has compiled a solidly conservative voting record, though he has a pragmatic streak and is hardly the most ideological Republican in the Texas delegation. In keeping with his scholarly nature, his official website includes an essay explaining his philosophy and explaining his interest 'in continuing to push government to work smarter and more efficiently.'"

From January 1995 to July 2017, Thornberry missed 140 of 15,276 roll call votes, or 0.9%, fewer than the median of 2.2% among the lifetime records of representatives currently serving.

=== Foreign policy ===
Thornberry was critical of President Barack Obama's 2010 arms control deal with Russia for precluding the use of nuclear weapons against non-nuclear nations. But he has been more pragmatic than other defense hawks. He served on a bipartisan commission in 2007 that drew up recommendations for winning the war in Iraq with both lethal and non-lethal approaches, such as diplomacy and foreign aid.

=== Taxation ===
On domestic issues, Thornberry pressed for repeal of the estate tax and for tax credits to encourage production of oil in marginal wells.

=== Other ===
In 2010 Thornberry sponsored a bill to expand access to state veterans' homes to parents whose children died while serving in the military. That bill became law. In January 2011 he introduced a bill to help states set up special health care courts staffed by judges with expertise in the subject. The judges would serve as an alternative to juries that Republicans say are inclined to award unnecessarily large damage amounts in malpractice cases.

=== Term limits ===
Thornberry consistently voted for term limits for U.S. Representatives, but did not intend to term-limit himself unless a constitutional amendment imposing term limits on all members of Congress had passed.

=== Agriculture and farm bill ===
Thornberry pressed the House to pass a farm bill every five years in order to give farmers and ranchers more stability. In 2013 he voted for the five-year Farm Bill, which included annual cuts of $2 billion from food stamps, which would have been the largest change to food policy since 1996. The House did not pass the bill.

=== Smith-Mundt Modernization Act of 2012 ===
In 2012 Thornberry introduced the Smith-Mundt Modernization Act of 2012 to amend the 1948 Smith-Mundt Act allowing the domestic dissemination of propaganda produced for domestic audiences, Americans.

=== Energy and climate change ===
In 2013 Thornberry introduced H.R. 2081, legislation to encourage production of all forms of domestic energy, including oil and gas, nuclear, and alternative energy and fuels.

Thornberry voted to open the Outer Continental Shelf to oil drilling. He voted to bar the EPA from regulating greenhouse gases, and voted against tax credits for renewable electricity.

In July 2015, President Obama signed highway funding extension legislation into law. It included a provision based on a liquefied natural gas (LNG) excise tax bill, H.R. 905, that Thornberry introduced with Rep. John Larson (D-CT). The federal excise tax on LNG and diesel has been set at 24.3 cents per gallon. Because it takes 1.7 gallons of LNG to produce the same amount of energy as a gallon of diesel fuel, LNG is being taxed 70 percent higher than diesel. The new law "levels the playing field" by applying the excise tax to LNG and diesel based on the amount of energy each produces, which is how it is applied to compressed natural gas and gasoline.

=== Defense reform ===
"In 2013, Thornberry led a long term effort to reform the Pentagon's acquisition programs. In 2016, he set acquisition reform as a key feature of the annual defense spending bill, including steps such as more experimentation with technology, encouragement of competition and clarification of intellectual property rights of Pentagon contractors."

=== Cybersecurity ===
In 2011, House Speaker John Boehner selected Thornberry to lead an initiative on cybersecurity to combat the growing national security and economic threat. The task force was composed of representatives from nine committees with jurisdiction over cyber issues. The panel recommended reforming a range of current laws, including the 2002 Federal Information Security Management Act, which governs government security programs.

In a 2012 column for Federal News Radio, Thornberry wrote, "If we can get an information sharing bill to the President, however, Congress should not consider their work done. We still have larger issues to grapple with, such as the role of the Department of Homeland Security and whether some industries will require a regulatory nudge to improve their network standards." That year, the House passed comprehensive cybersecurity legislation, but the Senate failed to act on any of it.

=== Drugs ===
In 2015, Thornberry introduced H.R. 1186, the Synthetic Abuse and Labeling Toxic Substances (SALTS) Act, which would make it easier for law enforcement officials to take action against synthetic drug manufacturers, distributors, and sellers by closing a loophole that makes it difficult to prosecute them if they label packages as "not intended for human consumption."

=== Interest group ratings ===
- In 2012, the American Conservative Union Ratings of Congress gave Thornberry a 96% rating for the year. He has a lifetime score of 95%.
- The National Right to Life Committee consistently scored Thornberry at 100%.
- The American Family Association, Christian Coalition of America, and Family Research Council all consistently gave Thornberry a 100% rating on family and marriage issues.
- The National Rifle Association gave Thornberry a lifetime rating of 92% on 2nd Amendment and gun rights issues.
- Gun Owners of America gave Thornberry a score of 90% on 2nd Amendment and gun rights issues.
- The Disabled American Veterans and Vietnam Veterans of America both gave Thornberry a 100% score on veterans' issues.
- Both the Fleet Reserve Association and Non Commissioned Officers Association gave Thornberry a 100% score on military issues.

== Political campaigns ==
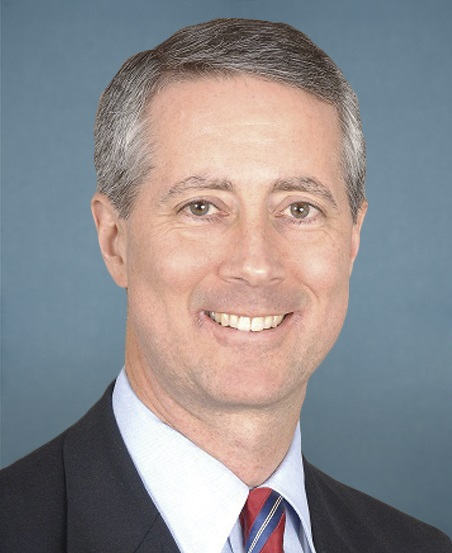
Thornberry during the 110th Congress

Thornberry defeated Democratic Congressman Bill Sarpalius in the 1994 general election, a heavily Republican year nationwide. He polled 79,416 votes (55 percent) to Sarpalius's 63,923 votes (44 percent). Two years earlier in a much higher-turnout election, Sarpalius received nearly double the votes that he did in 1994. The 13th has always been a somewhat conservative district, but on paper had been made somewhat less Republican in the 1990s redistricting. For this reason, Thornberry's victory was regarded as an upset.

Thornberry would never face another contest nearly as close as his initial one, and was reelected 10 times with at least 67 percent of the vote. While voters in this region began splitting their tickets as early as the 1940s, Democrats continued to hold most local offices well into the 1990s. Thornberry's win began a wave of Republican victories in this region, and it is now reckoned as one of the most Republican districts in the nation. In 2013 the Cook Partisan Voting Index rated it the most Republican district in the country (R+32).

Thornberry is only the third Republican to represent the district for a full term since Reconstruction. The previous Republican representatives were Robert D. "Bob" Price of Pampa (1967–75) and Beau Boulter of Amarillo (1985–89).

In the 2006 and 2008 elections, Thornberry handily defeated former intelligence officer and professor Roger Waun.

In the 2012 Republican primary, Thornberry overwhelmed his lone opponent, Pamela Lee Barlow, 47,251 votes (78 percent) to 13,643 (22 percent). In the general election, Thornberry bested (91 percent) Libertarian John Robert Deek of Denton and Green Party candidate Keith F. Houston of Canyon (there was no Democratic candidate).

In the 2014 Republican primary, Thornberry easily won re-nomination, with 45,097 votes (68 percent) to challengers Pamela Barlow's 12,438 (19 percent) and Elaine Hays's 8,860 (13 percent).

=== General election results ===
Texas 13th Congressional District 1994
Party	Candidate	Votes	%
Republican	Mac Thornberry	79,466	55
Democratic	Bill Sarpalius (Incumbent)	63,923	45
Total votes		143,389	100

Texas 13th Congressional District 1996
Party	Candidate	Votes	%
Republican	Mac Thornberry (Incumbent)	116,098	67
Democratic	Samuel Brown Silverman	56,066	32
Independent	Don Harkey	1,463	1
Total votes		173,627	100

Texas 13th Congressional District 1998
Party	Candidate	Votes	%
Republican	Mac Thornberry (Incumbent)	81,141	68
Democratic	Mark Harmon	37,027	31
Libertarian	Georganne Baker Payne	1,298	1
Total votes		119,466	100

Texas 13th Congressional District 2000
Party	Candidate	Votes	%
Republican	Mac Thornberry (Incumbent)	117,995	68
Democratic	Curtis Clinesmith	54,343	31
Libertarian	Brad Clardy	2,137	1
Total votes		174,475	100

Texas 13th Congressional District 2002
Party	Candidate	Votes	%
Republican	Mac Thornberry (Incumbent)	119,401	79
Democratic	Zane Reese	31,218	21
Total votes		150,619	100

Texas 13th Congressional District 2004
Party	Candidate	Votes	%
Republican	Mac Thornberry (Incumbent)	189,448	92
Libertarian	John Robert Deek	15,793	8
Total votes		205,241	100

Texas 13th Congressional District 2006
Party	Candidate	Votes	%
Republican	Mac Thornberry (Incumbent)	108,107	74
Democratic	Roger J. Waun	33,460	23
Libertarian	Keith Dyer	3,829	3
Total votes		145,396	100

Texas 13th Congressional District 2008
Party	Candidate	Votes	%
Republican	Mac Thornberry (Incumbent)	180,078	78
Democratic	Roger James Waun	51,841	22
Total votes		231,919	100

Texas 13th Congressional District 2010
Party	Candidate	Votes	%
Republican	Mac Thornberry (Incumbent)	113,201	87
Libertarian	John T. Burwell, Jr.	5,650	4
Independent	Keith Dyer	11,192	9
Total votes		130,043	100

Texas 13th Congressional District 2012
Party	Candidate	Votes	%
Republican	Mac Thornberry (Incumbent)	187,775	91
Libertarian	John Robert Deek	12,701	6
Green	Keith F. Houston	5,912	3
Total votes		206,388	100

Texas 13th Congressional District 2014
Party	Candidate	Votes	%
Republican	Mac Thornberry (Incumbent)	110,842	84
Democratic	Mike Minter	16,822	13
Libertarian	Emily Pivoda	2,863	2
Green	Don Cook	924	.70
Total votes		131,451	100

Texas 13th Congressional District 2016
Party	Candidate	Votes	%
Republican	Mac Thornberry (Incumbent)	199,050	90
Libertarian	Calvin DeWeese	14,725	7
Green	H.F. "Rusty" Tomlinson	7,467	3
Total votes		221,242	100

Texas 13th Congressional District 2018
Party	Candidate	Votes	%
Republican	Mac Thornberry (Incumbent)	168,090	81.6
Democratic	Greg Sagan	34,859	16.9
Libertarian	Calvin DeWeese	3,144	1.5
Total votes		206,093	100

== Later career ==
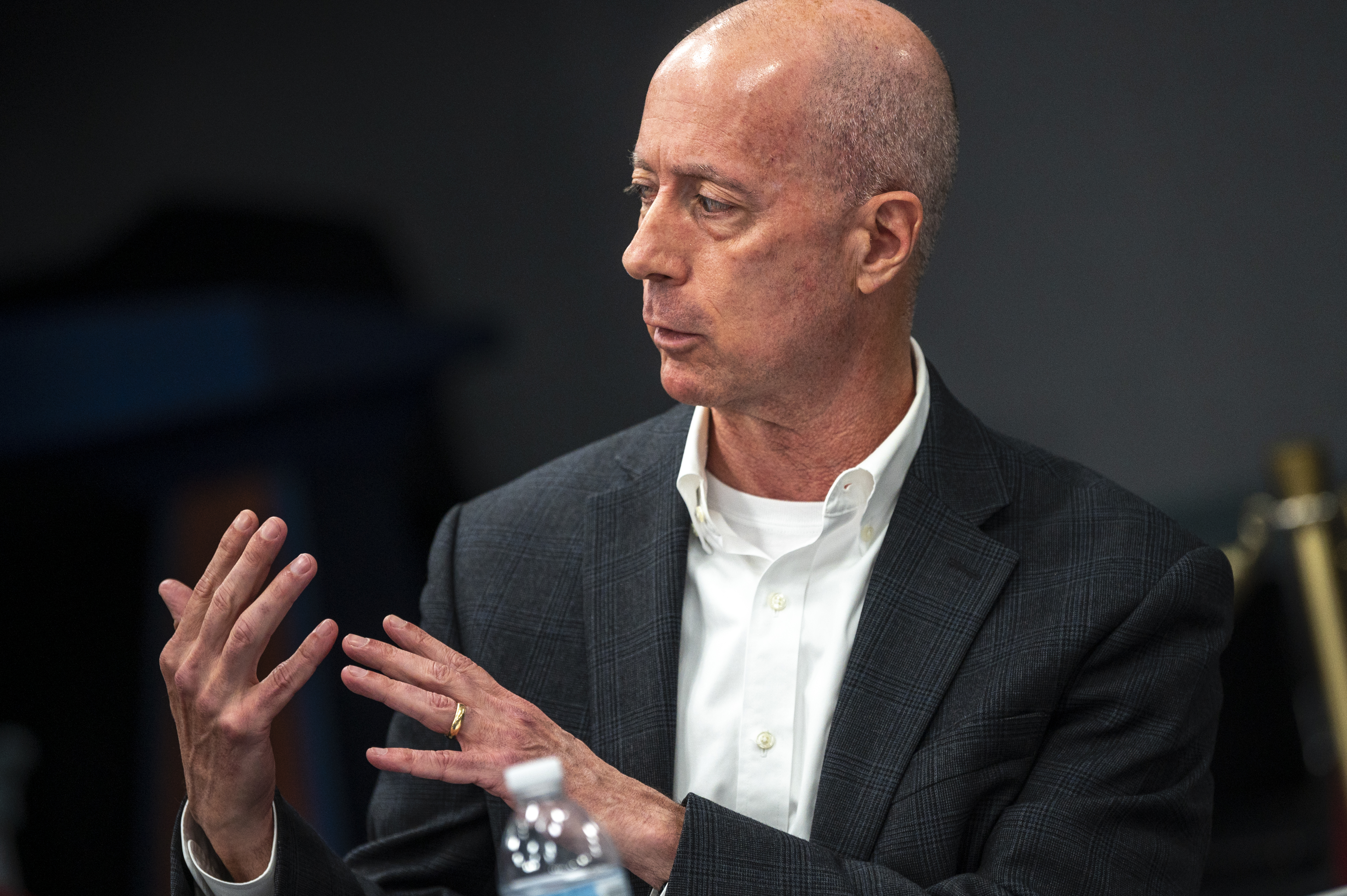
Thornberry in October 2022

=== Business ===
Thornberry joined the CAE USA board of directors, the National Defense Industrial Association Emerging Technologies Institute advisory board, and the Potomac Institute's board of regents after retiring from government service. In October 2022, Thornberry was appointed to the Defense Innovation Board. As of October 2023, he serves on the Special Competitive Studies Project's board of advisors. In March 2024, Thornberry was appointed to the board of directors at Booz Allen Hamilton.

U.S. House of Representatives
Preceded by Bill Sarpalius	Member of the U.S. House of Representatives from Texas's 13th congressional district 1995–2021	Succeeded by Ronny Jackson
Preceded by Buck McKeon	Chair of the House Armed Services Committee; 2015–2019	Succeeded by Adam Smith
Preceded by Adam Smith	Ranking Member of the House Armed Services Committee; 2019–2021	Succeeded by Mike Rogers
U.S. order of precedence (ceremonial)
Preceded by Gene Green as Former U.S. Representative	Order of precedence of the United States as Former U.S. Representative	Succeeded by Kevin Brady as Former U.S. Representative
