= 1988 United States Senate election in Texas =

- November 8, 1988
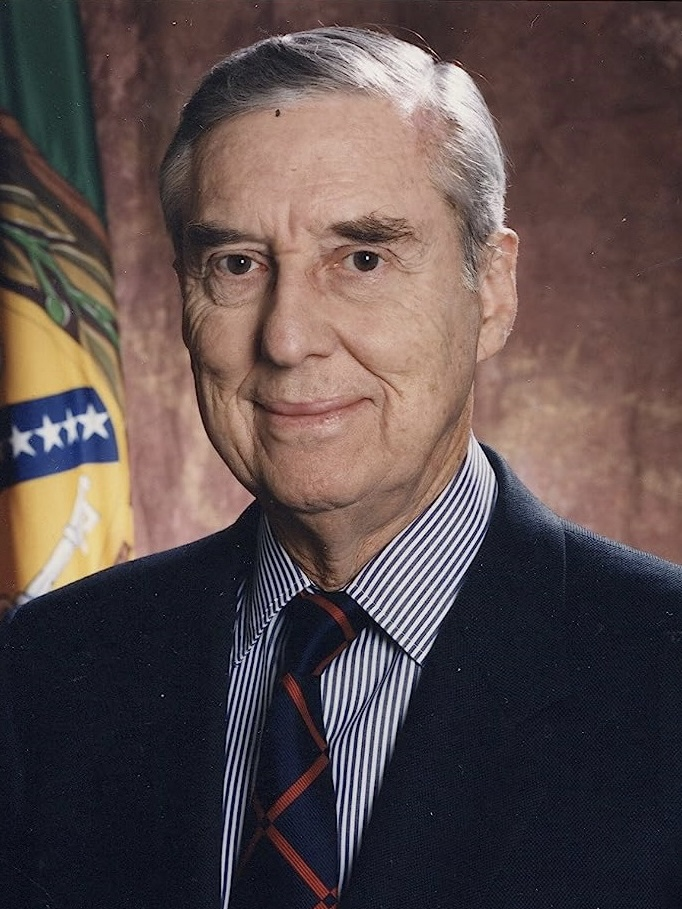

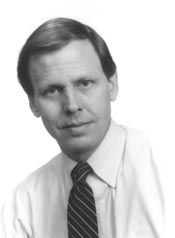
Nominee	Lloyd Bentsen	Beau Boulter
Party	Democratic	Republican
Popular vote	3,149,806	2,129,228
Percentage	59.17%	40.00%
- Bentsen: 50–60% 60–70% 70–80% 80–90% >90% Boulter: 50–60% 60–70%
U.S. senator before election
Lloyd Bentsen
Democratic
Elected U.S. Senator
Lloyd Bentsen
Democratic

The 1988 United States Senate election in Texas was held on November 8, 1988. Incumbent Democratic U.S. Senator Lloyd Bentsen won re-election to a fourth term, defeating Republican U.S. Representative Beau Boulter.

Bentsen easily won the Democratic nomination for another term, while Boulter came through a run-off in the Republican primary defeating Wes Gilbreath. After winning renomination, Bentsen was chosen by Democratic presidential nominee Michael Dukakis as his vice-presidential running mate and therefore ran for both the Senate and the vice-presidency at the same time. Although the Dukakis/Bentsen presidential ticket lost the general election by 7 points and the election in Texas by 12.6 points, Bentsen was always the favorite for the Senate election and defeated Boulter by 19.2 points.

This was the last time a Democrat won a U.S. Senate election in Texas until James Talarico did so in 2026 and remains the last time a Democrat has won the state's Class 1 Senate seat.

== Primaries ==
=== Democratic primary ===
In the Democratic primary, Senator Lloyd Bentsen defeated the same opponent he had beaten in 1982, Joe Sullivan, a psychology professor from San Antonio.

Bentsen had been a senator from Texas since first winning election in 1970 and had been re-elected in 1976 and 1982. He was also Chairman of the Senate Finance Committee and the clear favorite for re-election in 1988. Sullivan stood on a platform calling for reduced spending by the federal government, but had been easily defeated by Bentsen in the 1982 Democratic primary. This was repeated in 1988 with Bentsen winning the primary with over 80% of the vote.

March 8 Democratic primary results
Party	Candidate	Votes	%
Democratic	Lloyd Bentsen (incumbent)	1,365,736	84.8
Democratic	Joe Sullivan	244,805	15.2
Total votes		1,610,541	100

=== Republican primary ===
Four candidates competed for the Republican nomination; U.S. representative Beau Boulter, former state representative Milton Fox, millionaire Houston businessman Wes Gilbreath and businessman Ned Snead. Boulter was a two-term representative for the 13th district, while Gilbreath was competing in his first election, but spent $500,000 on the primary.

Wes Gilbreath led in the March primary with 36.7%, but as no candidate won a majority, went into a run-off election against Beau Boulter who came second with 30.5%.

March 8 Republican primary results
Party	Candidate	Votes	%
Republican	Wes Gilbreath	275,080	36.7
Republican	Beau Boulter	228,676	30.5
Republican	Milton Fox	138,031	18.4
Republican	Ned Snead	107,560	14.4
Total votes		749,347	100

There were few policy differences between Boulter and Gilbreath, with both candidates being conservatives who opposed abortion and called for reduced government spending. Gilbreath spent about one million dollars of his money in his contest for the primary, while Boulter spent about $250,000. However Boulter won endorsements from many Texas Republican leaders, including the candidates who had come third and fourth in the March primary, as well as from anti-abortion groups.

Boulter won the April run-off for the Republican nomination with just over 60% of the vote.

April 12 Republican run-off results
Party	Candidate	Votes	%
Republican	Beau Boulter	111,134	60.2
Republican	Wes Gilbreath	73,573	39.8
Total votes		184,707	100

== Vice-presidential candidate ==
In July 1988, Democratic presidential nominee Michael Dukakis chose Lloyd Bentsen to be his vice-presidential running mate. As the Texas Democrats had already nominated Bentsen for the Senate, he could not be replaced on the ballot. Bentsen was able to run both for the Senate and for vice president as Lyndon Johnson had gotten Texas to change the law in 1960 to allow him to do the same in the 1960 election.

However, Beau Boulter attacked Bentsen for running for both the Senate and vice presidency, calling it arrogant, unethical and possibly illegal. Boulter and the National Republican Senatorial Committee filed a complaint with the Federal Election Commission (FEC) claiming that the dual candidacy violated federal campaign finance laws as any spending in one race would unfairly affect the other campaign, however the FEC rejected the complaint and this decision was confirmed by the United States courts of appeals. Boulter continued to attack Bentsen over the dual candidacy running a campaign ad in August 1988 mocking Bentsen for trying to ride two horses at the same time.

== Campaign ==
Lloyd Bentsen was always the favorite for the election, with a large cash advantage over Beau Boulter. Filings with the FEC at the beginning of August showed Bentsen had $3.9 million compared to only $14,000 for Boulter. The financial advantage for Bentsen continued through the campaign and by the beginning of November Bentsen had raised $7.5 million for the senate election, while Boulter had raised $2.7 million.

Boulter's campaign receive little or no official Republican support, with the Republican presidential campaign giving a not very subtle endorsement of a "Texas Ticket", which was George Bush for president and Bentsen for the Senate. However Boulter hoped to benefit from Bush's coattails and ran campaign ads pointing to his links with Bush and Ronald Reagan. Boulter also ran ads attacking Bentsen for supporting giving benefit to illegal immigrants, but this was denied by the Bentsen campaign. Meanwhile, Bentsen ran ads showing things they said he had done for Texas such as passing a trade bill, catastrophic coverage legislation, repealing the windfall profit tax and preserving local bus services.

At the beginning of October 1988, Democratic polls showed Bentsen at least 20 points ahead of Boulter, with Bentsen spending much of his time campaigning for the presidential election and very little time on the Senate election.

== Results ==
Bentsen won the election by a wide margin over Boulter on the same ballot that he and Michael Dukakis lost the presidential race, with George Bush winning his home state of Texas with 56% of the vote compared to 43% for Dukakis. Bentsen's vote total in the Senate election was the highest vote total in any Texas statewide election. Boulter's showing was particularly embarrassing for the Texas GOP, given that Bush easily carried Texas by a margin nearly as large as Bentsen’s.

Bentsen received 93% of the black vote.

General election results
Party	Candidate	Votes	%	±%
Democratic	Lloyd Bentsen (incumbent)	3,149,806	59.17%	+0.58%
Republican	Beau Boulter	2,129,228	40.00%	−0.50%
Libertarian	Jeff Daiell	44,572	0.84%	+0.08%
Majority		1,020,578	19.17%	+1.08%
Turnout		5,323,606		
Democratic hold				

== See also ==
- 1988 United States Senate elections

== Works cited ==
- Black, Earl; Black, Merle (1992). The Vital South: How Presidents Are Elected. Harvard University Press. ISBN 0674941306.
