= Abraham Kazen =

American politician (1919–1987)

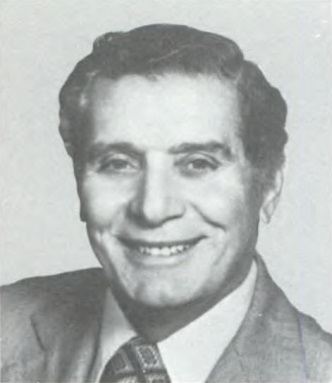

Member of the U.S. House of Representatives from Texas's 23rd district
- In office January 3, 1967 – January 3, 1985
- Preceded by: New established district
- Succeeded by: Albert Bustamante

Member of the Texas State Senate from the 21st district
- In office 1953–1967
- Preceded by: William A. Shofner
- Succeeded by: Wayne Connally

Member of the Texas House of Representatives from the 75th district
- In office 1947–1953

Personal details
- Born: January 17, 1919 Laredo, Texas, U.S.
- Died: November 29, 1987 (aged 68) Austin, Texas, U.S.
- Resting place: Calvary Catholic Cemetery in Laredo, Texas
- Party: Democratic
- Spouse: Connie Raymond
- Relations: George P. Kazen (nephew)
- Children: 5
- Education: University of Texas at Austin; Cumberland School of Law
- Occupation: Attorney

Military service
- Allegiance: United States
- Branch/service: Army Air Corps
- Rank: Captain
- Battles/wars: North Africa, Sicily, and Italy in World War II

Abraham Kazen Jr., usually known as Chick Kazen (January 17, 1919 – November 29, 1987), was a U.S. representative from Texas's 23rd congressional district, the first to serve in that particular position. Elected in 1966, Kazen served until 1985, having been defeated in the 1984 Democratic primary election by Albert G. Bustamante.

== Background ==
Kazen was of Maronite Lebanese descent, and was related to the powerful Khazen family. He was a lifelong resident of the border city of Laredo. He graduated in 1937 from Laredo High School, renamed Martin High School. He then attended the University of Texas at Austin from 1937 to 1940. In 1941, Kazen graduated from the Cumberland School of Law in Lebanon, Tennessee, since removed to Birmingham, Alabama.

== Military service ==
Kazen served in 1942 as a United States Army Air Corps pilot at the since closed Lubbock Air Force Base. During World War II, Kazen fought in North Africa, Sicily, and Italy as a pilot in Troop Carrier Command. He was discharged in 1953 with the rank of captain.

== Public service ==
In 1946, Kazen was elected to the Texas House of Representatives and served from 1947 to 1953. He then served in the Texas Senate from 1953 to 1967, and was elected president pro tempore of the State Senate in 1959. He served as acting governor of Texas on August 4, 1959. He was a member of the Texas Legislative Council for sixteen years.

He was elected to Congress as a Democrat in 1966 representing the newly created 23rd District. It was the largest congressional district in area in the nation (excluding at-large districts encompassing whole states), stretching across 800 miles from El Paso in the west to San Antonio in the east. It had been created when Texas' previous congressional map was thrown out by the United States Supreme Court in the case Wesberry v. Sanders. He was reelected eight more times with no substantive opposition.

In 1984, Kazen's opponent in the Democratic primary was Bexar County Circuit Court Judge Albert Bustamante. By this time, the 23rd had become a majority-Hispanic district. Due in part to the demographic changes in the district, Bustamante upset Kazen in the primary, ending Kazen's 39 years as an elected official. After Kazen's defeat, no non-Hispanic white Democrat represented a significant portion of San Antonio in the House until Lloyd Doggett had his Austin-based district redrawn to include a section of San Antonio.

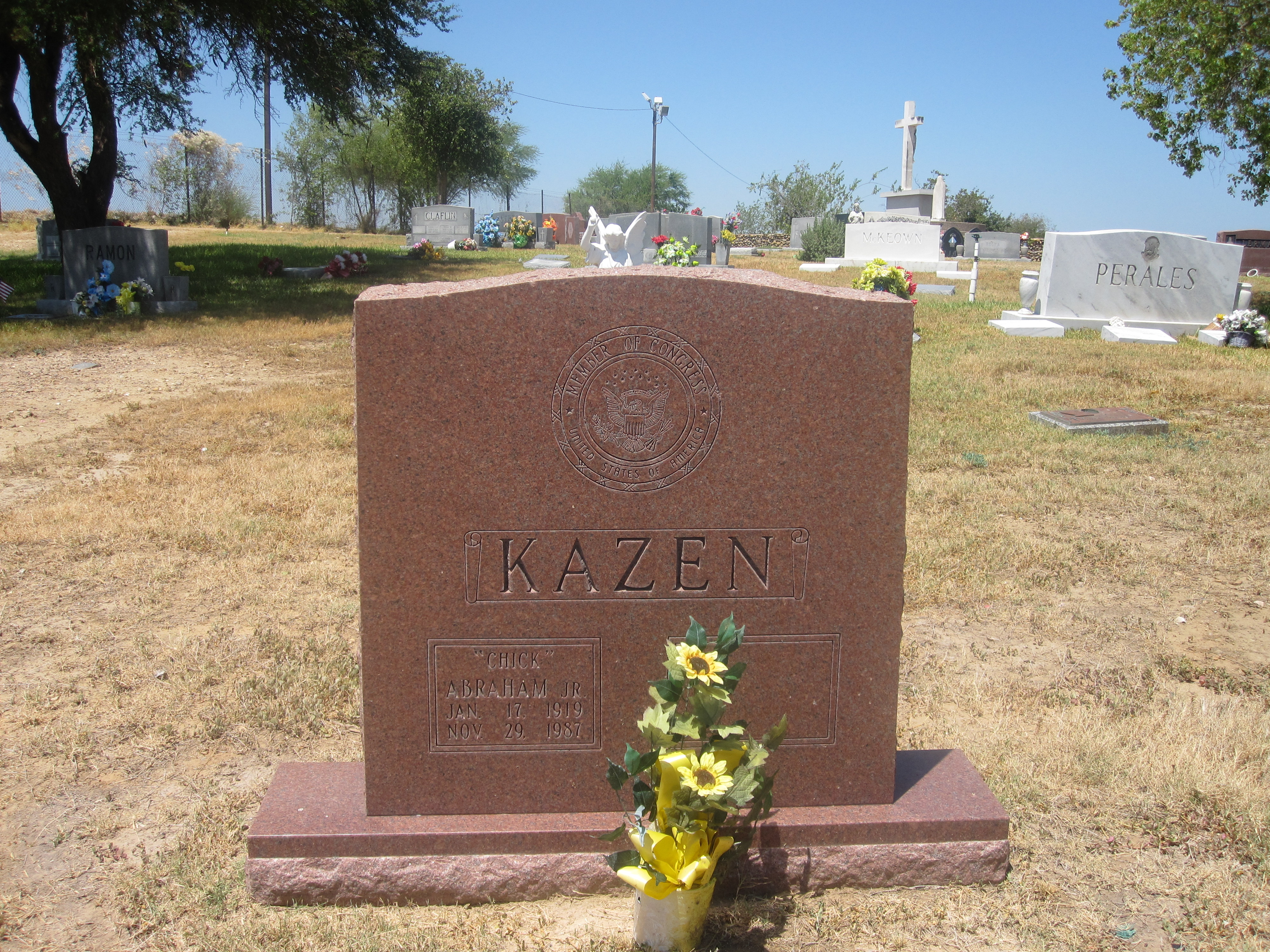
Kazen grave with congressional emblem on tombstone at Calvary Catholic Cemetery in Laredo, Texas

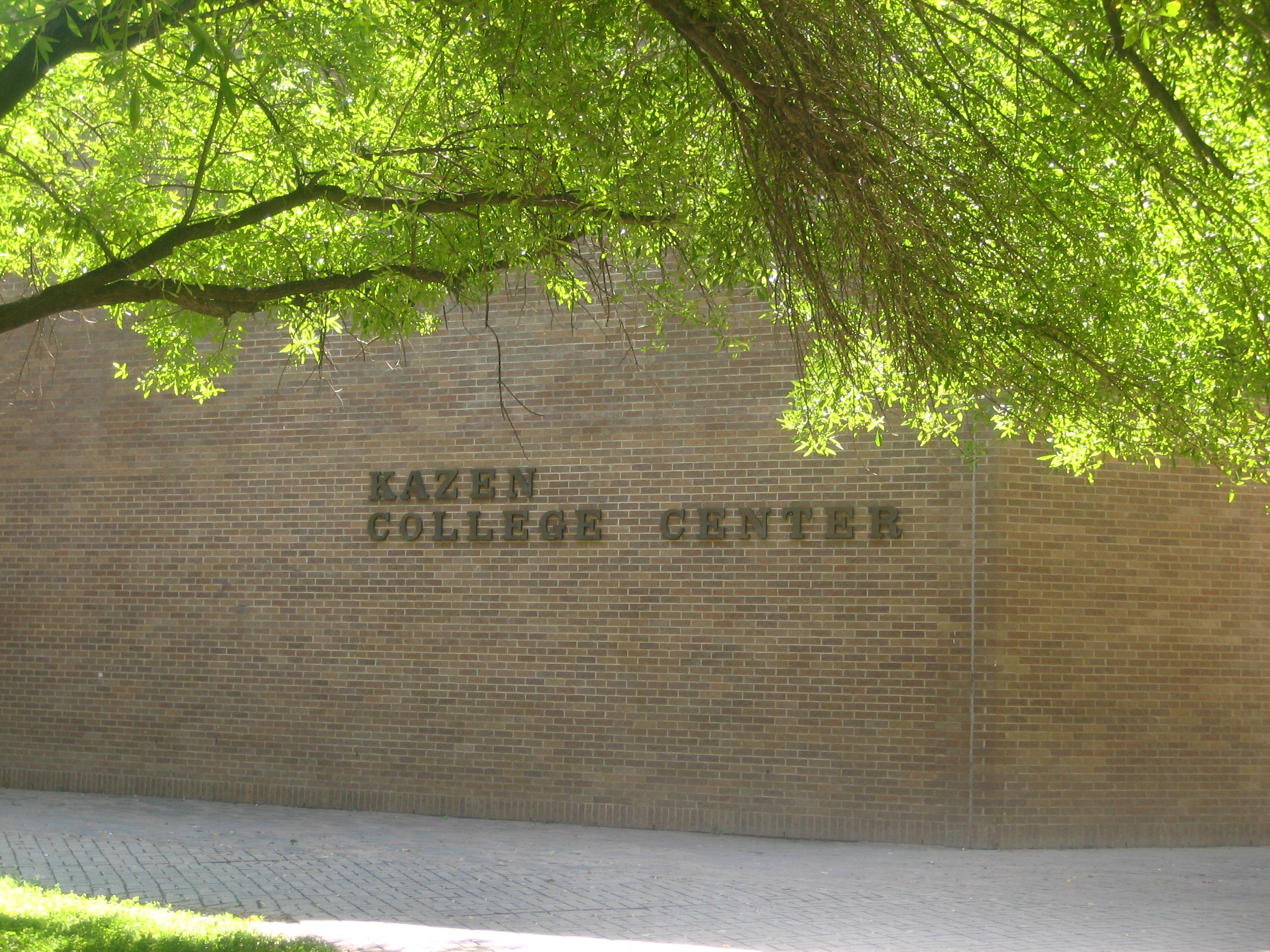
The Kazen College Center on the Laredo Community College campus

== See also ==
- List of Arab and Middle-Eastern Americans in the United States Congress

U.S. House of Representatives
Preceded by New District	Member of the U.S. House of Representatives from Texas's 23rd congressional district 1967–1985	Succeeded by Albert G. Bustamante
