= Albert Bustamante =

American politician (1935–2021)

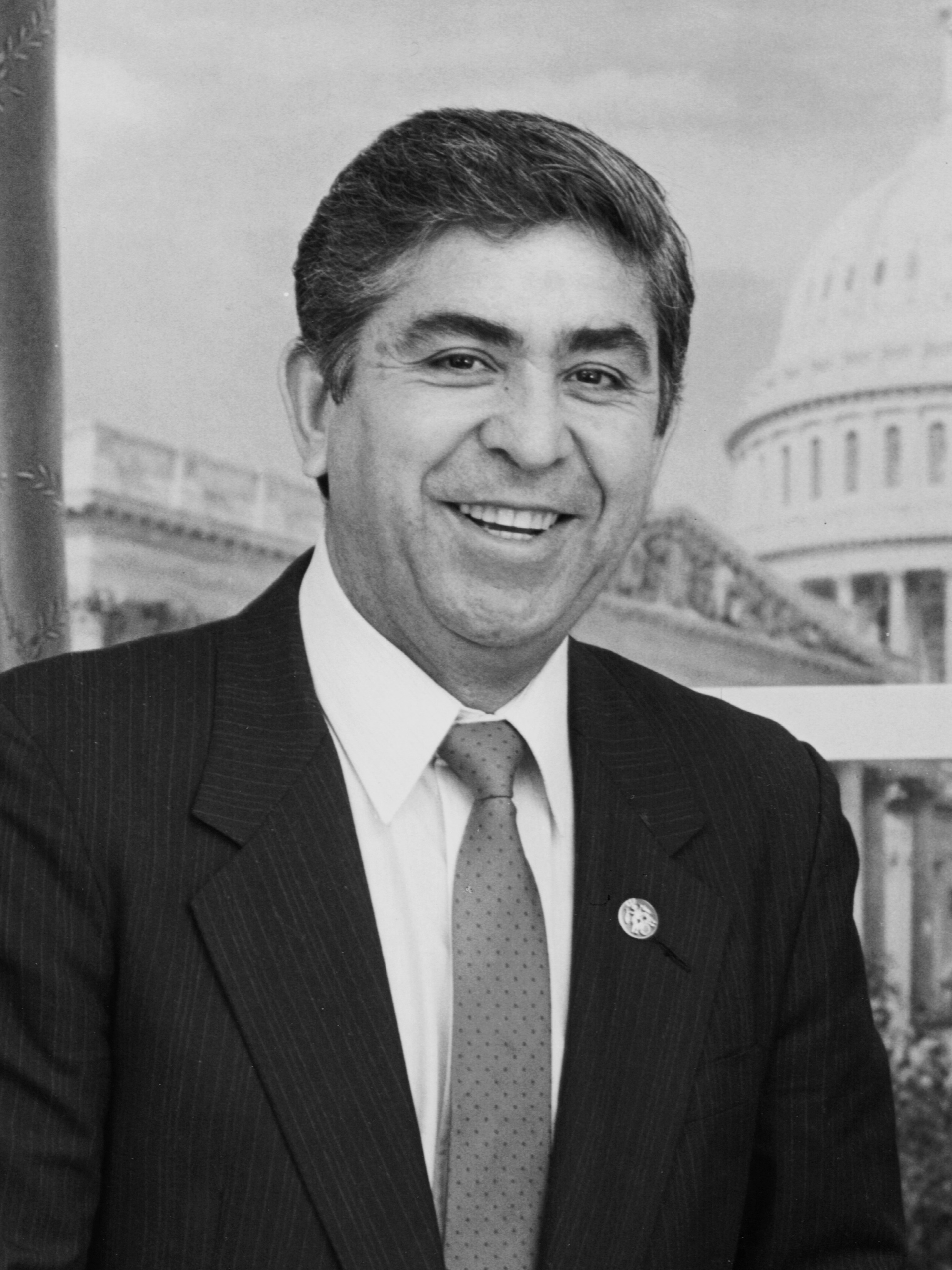

Member of the U.S. House of Representatives from Texas's 23rd district
- In office January 3, 1985 – January 3, 1993
- Preceded by: Abraham Kazen
- Succeeded by: Henry Bonilla

Personal details
- Born: Albert Garza Bustamante; April 8, 1935 Asherton, Texas, U.S.
- Died: November 30, 2021 (aged 86)
- Party: Democratic
- Spouse: Rebecca Bustamante
- Education: San Antonio College (attended); Sul Ross State University (BA)

Albert Garza Bustamante (April 8, 1935 – November 30, 2021) was an American politician who served as a member of the United States House of Representatives, representing Texas's 23rd district. A Democrat, he served as a member and one-time Chair of the Congressional Hispanic Caucus.

== Early life and education ==
Bustamante was born and raised in Asherton, Texas to a family of Mexican migrant workers. After graduating from high school, he enlisted in the United States Army, serving for two years as a paratrooper. In 1958, he enrolled in San Antonio College, earning an associate degree. Bustamante then earned a Bachelor of Arts degree in education from Sul Ross State University. After earning his degree, he was hired as a teacher at San Antonio's Cooper Jr. High School.

== Career ==
In 1968, Bustamante took a job as an aide to Congressman Henry B. González. In his first run for elective office in 1972, Bustamante was elected as a Bexar County, Texas, Commissioner. He then was elected as a county judge in 1978 and served on the state's Jail Standard Commission.

=== Congress ===
In 1984, Bustamante challenged nine-term incumbent Abraham Kazen in the Democratic primary for Texas's 23rd congressional district. No Republican had filed in the heavily Democratic, Hispanic-majority district. He defeated Kazen in an upset, all but assuring his election in November. He was reelected three times from this vast district, which spanned 800 miles from his home in San Antonio to El Paso.

While in Congress, he served on the Armed Services Committee. He served on the Procurement and Military Nuclear Systems Subcommittee, the Subcommittee on Energy, and the Natural Resources Subcommittee. In 1987 and 1988, he supported nuclear test ban amendments, and voiced concern for environmental and safety problems in the nation's nuclear production plants. He played an important role in delaying funding for a Special Isotope Separation project in Idaho.

In 1985, Bustamante was elected president of his Democratic freshman class in the U.S. House of Representatives and was assigned to the Committees on Armed Services and Government Operations.

Bustamante changed his support of the administration's policy toward Nicaragua. In 1986, he voted to authorize an aid package for the Contras, but in the following two years he voted against Contra aid.

In the 100th United States Congress, Bustamante was assigned to the Select Committee on Hunger. In December 1990, Bustamante became a member of the House Democratic Steering and Policy Committee.

He was also a member of the House Task Force on Drugs and Crime, in which he advocated for tighter border controls to keep out illegal drugs from Mexico. Bustamante called for deficit reduction, but also believed that more money should be spent on education and health care.

=== Investigation and conviction ===
In 1992, Bustamante filed for reelection even as he was investigated for fraud and racketeering. His reelection chances were further hampered by redistricting after the 1990 United States census, which carved the 28th district out of most of Bustamante's territory and left a heavily Republican section of western San Antonio in the 23rd. Bustamante's Republican opponent, popular newscaster Henry Bonilla, criticized Bustamante for neglecting the needs of his constituents, excessive junketeering, and writing 30 bad checks in the House banking scandal. Although Bill Clinton carried the district, Bustamante lost to Bonilla by a 21-point margin, the largest margin of defeat for an incumbent that year.

Bustamante was convicted of accepting bribes and racketeering in 1993 and was sentenced to 42 months in prison. Bustamante was released from prison on February 9, 1998.

== Personal life ==
Following his release from prison, Bustamante faded from politics. He lived in San Antonio with his wife, Rebecca.

Bustamante's son, John, a San Antonio-based patent attorney, was an unsuccessful candidate for Texas's 23rd congressional district in the 2012 elections.

Bustamante died following a long illness on November 30, 2021, at the age of 86.

== See also ==
- List of American federal politicians convicted of crimes
- List of federal political scandals in the United States
- List of Hispanic and Latino Americans in the United States Congress

U.S. House of Representatives
Preceded by Abraham Kazen	Member of the U.S. House of Representatives from Texas's 23rd congressional district 1985–1993	Succeeded by Henry Bonilla
Preceded by Esteban Edward Torres	Chair of the Congressional Hispanic Caucus; 1987–1988	Succeeded by Jaime Fuster
