= Bill Sarpalius =

American politician

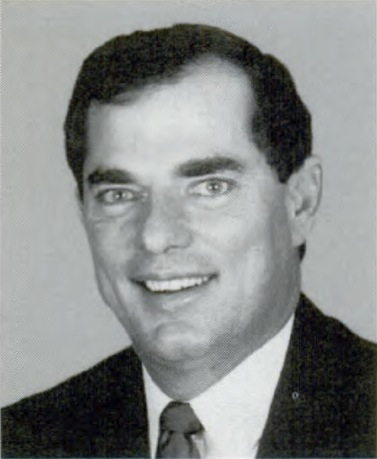

Member of the U.S. House of Representatives from Texas's 13th district
- In office January 3, 1989 – January 3, 1995
- Preceded by: Beau Boulter
- Succeeded by: Mac Thornberry

Member of the Texas Senate from the 31st district
- In office January 13, 1981 – January 3, 1989
- Preceded by: Bob Price
- Succeeded by: Teel Bivins

Personal details
- Born: William Clarence Sarpalius; January 10, 1948 (age 78) Los Angeles, California, U.S.
- Party: Democratic
- Spouse: Jenny Barnett
- Children: 1
- Education: Clarendon College; Texas Tech University (BS); West Texas A&M University (MBA)

William Clarence Sarpalius (/sɑːrˈpɔːləs/; born January 10, 1948) is an American politician and lobbyist who served in the United States House of Representatives from 1989 to 1995. A Democrat, he represented Texas's 13th congressional district, a large tract of land which stretched from the Texas Panhandle eastward to Wichita Falls.

== Biography ==
Born in Los Angeles, Sarpalius experienced homelessness as a young boy in Houston, along with his mother and two younger brothers. In 1961, when he was thirteen, he and his brothers were placed at Cal Farley's Boys Ranch near Amarillo. By the time he was nineteen, Sarpalius was the state president of the Future Farmers of America.

He first attended Clarendon College in Clarendon, Texas. He subsequently received a Bachelor of Science degree in agribusiness from Texas Tech University in Lubbock, from which he was later named a distinguished alumnus. In 1972, Sarpalius was hired by Cal Farley's Ranch as a vocational agriculture teacher at the school. In 1978, he left the ranch to return to school and received an M.B.A. from West Texas State University in Canyon, Texas. He then launched a career in agribusiness.

=== Congress ===
In 1980, Sarpalius successfully ran for a seat in the Texas State Senate, a body in which he served until 1989. He was elected in 1988 to the U.S. House of Representatives, where he was a member of the Agricultural Committee. Sarpalius was one of a number of congressmen involved in drafting the guidelines of the North American Free Trade Agreement. As a Lithuanian American, Sarpalius called for American aid to Lithuania, which was occupied by the Soviet Union and then reclaimed its independence at the end of the Cold War. In 1998, he was awarded the Order of the Lithuanian Grand Duke Gediminas, "the highest award and recognition that Lithuania could give to a noncitizen by the President of Lithuania."

"The president said some very nice things about my efforts in helping the Lithuanian people in their fight for freedom. He told the crowd about President Landsbergis's visit to my office that night in 1989 and the vision that he had shared with me. He acknowledged the members of Congress who had worked tirelessly to help the tiny Baltic states gain their freedom from the Soviet Union."

Sarpalius won a second term in the House in 1990, when he defeated Republican State Representative Richard A. Waterfield of Canadian in Hemphill County, who resigned from the legislature to make the congressional race. In 1992, Sarpalius faced a spirited challenge from his Republican predecessor, Beau Boulter of Amarillo, who vacated the House seat in 1988 to challenge Democratic U.S. Senator Lloyd Bentsen.

In 1994, however, Sarpalius was one of a large number of House Democrats unseated in the "Republican Revolution". He lost to former Reagan administration official Mac Thornberry, taking only 45 percent of the vote to Thornberry's 55 percent. Thornberry would go on to hold the seat for almost a quarter-century. To date, Sarpalius is the last Democrat to garner even 40 percent of the district's vote.

=== Later career ===
After leaving Congress, Sarpalius was appointed by U.S. President Bill Clinton as a top official in the U.S. Department of Agriculture. He is currently the chief executive officer of Advantage Associates, a powerful Washington consulting firm made up of former elected officials. After the success of his book The Grand Duke from Boys Ranch, he became a sought after motivational public speaker.

=== Personal ===
Sarpalius is Roman Catholic and affiliated with Lions International. He has a son, David William Sarpalius, from a former marriage.

U.S. House of Representatives
Preceded by Beau Boulter	Member of the U.S. House of Representatives from Texas's 13th congressional district 1989–1995	Succeeded by Mac Thornberry
U.S. order of precedence (ceremonial)
Preceded by Kent Hance as Former U.S. Representative	Order of precedence of the United States as Former U.S. Representative	Succeeded by Craig Washington as Former U.S. Representative
