= Beau Boulter =

American politician (born 1942)

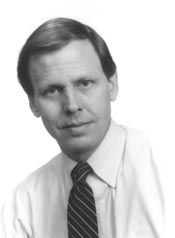

Member of the U.S. House of Representatives from Texas's 13th district
- In office January 3, 1985 – January 3, 1989
- Preceded by: Jack Hightower
- Succeeded by: Bill Sarpalius

Personal details
- Born: Eldon Beau Boulter; February 23, 1942 (age 84) El Paso, Texas, U.S.
- Party: Republican
- Education: University of Texas, Austin (BA); Baylor University (JD)

Eldon Beau Boulter (born February 23, 1942) is an American politician. From 1985 to 1989, he served two terms as a Republican member of the United States House of Representatives, representing the 13th district of Texas.

== Biography ==
Boulter was born in El Paso, Texas. He and his family moved to Levelland, Texas. He attended Levelland High School, graduating in 1960. Boulter attended the University of Texas at Austin, where he earned his bachelor's degree in government in 1965. He then attended Baylor Law School, graduating in 1968.

=== Career ===
Boulter practiced law in Amarillo, Texas. He served as a member of the Amarillo City Commission.

==== Congress ====
In 1984 Boulter was elected to represent the 13th district of Texas in the United States House of Representatives. Boulter defeated incumbent Jack Hightower, thus becoming one of six house seats that the Republicans gained in Texas, also known as the Texas Six Pack. Before the win, Boulter was interviewed and he made declarations based on abortion and also other issues.

In 1989, Boulter was succeeded by Bill Sarpalius after losing his campaign for the United States Senate in 1988.

U.S. House of Representatives
Preceded by Jack Hightower	Member of the U.S. House of Representatives from Texas's 13th congressional district 1985–1989	Succeeded by Bill Sarpalius
Party political offices
Preceded by James M. Collins	Republican nominee for U.S. Senator from Texas (Class 1); 1988	Succeeded by Kay Bailey Hutchison
U.S. order of precedence (ceremonial)
Preceded by Alan Steelman as Former U.S. Representative	Order of precedence of the United States as Former U.S. Representative	Succeeded by Steve Stockman as Former U.S. Representative
