= 2020 Texas Democratic presidential primary =

- March 3, 2020

260 delegates (228 pledged, 32 unpledged) to the Democratic National Convention The number of pledged delegates won is determined by the popular vote

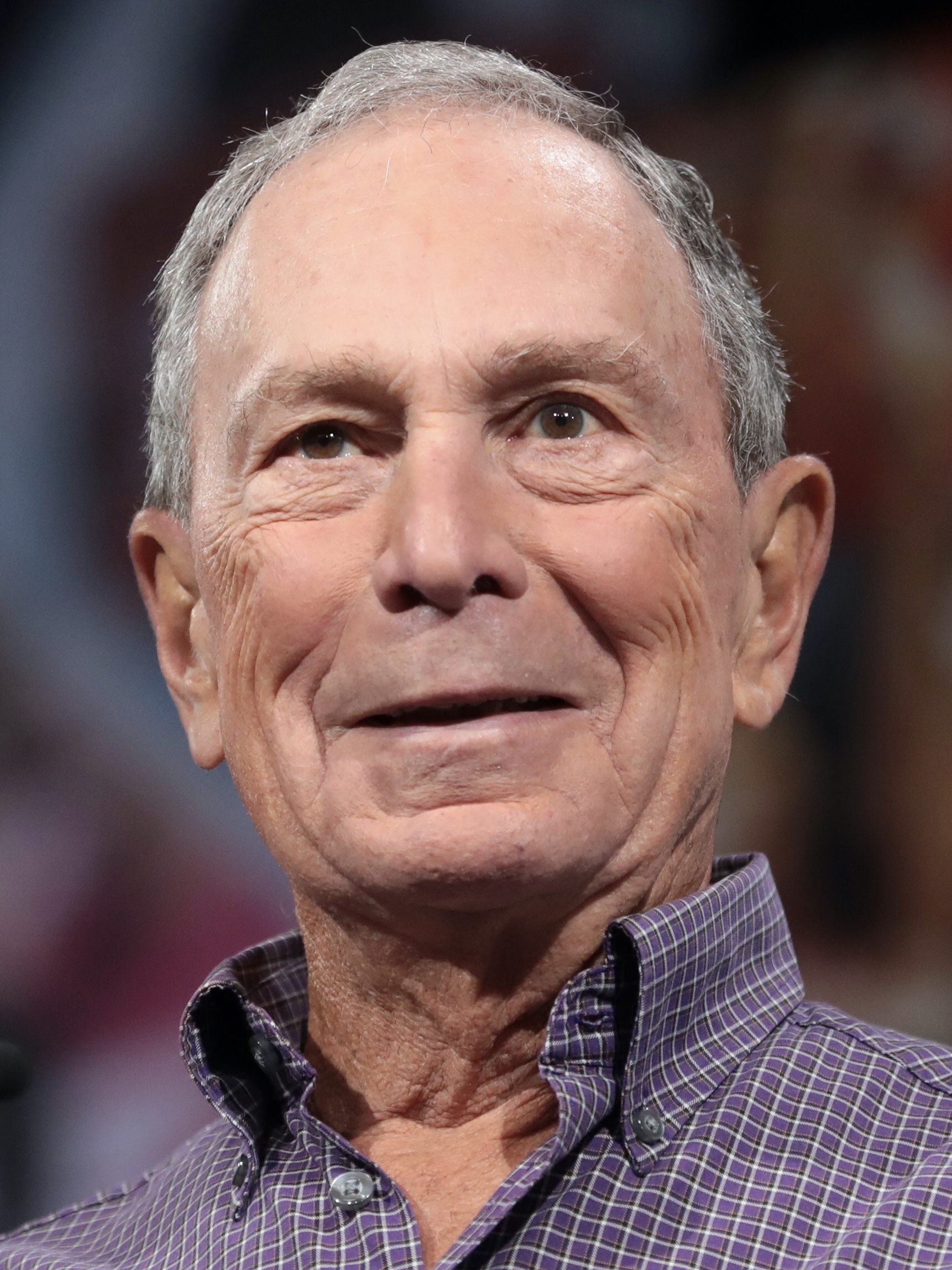

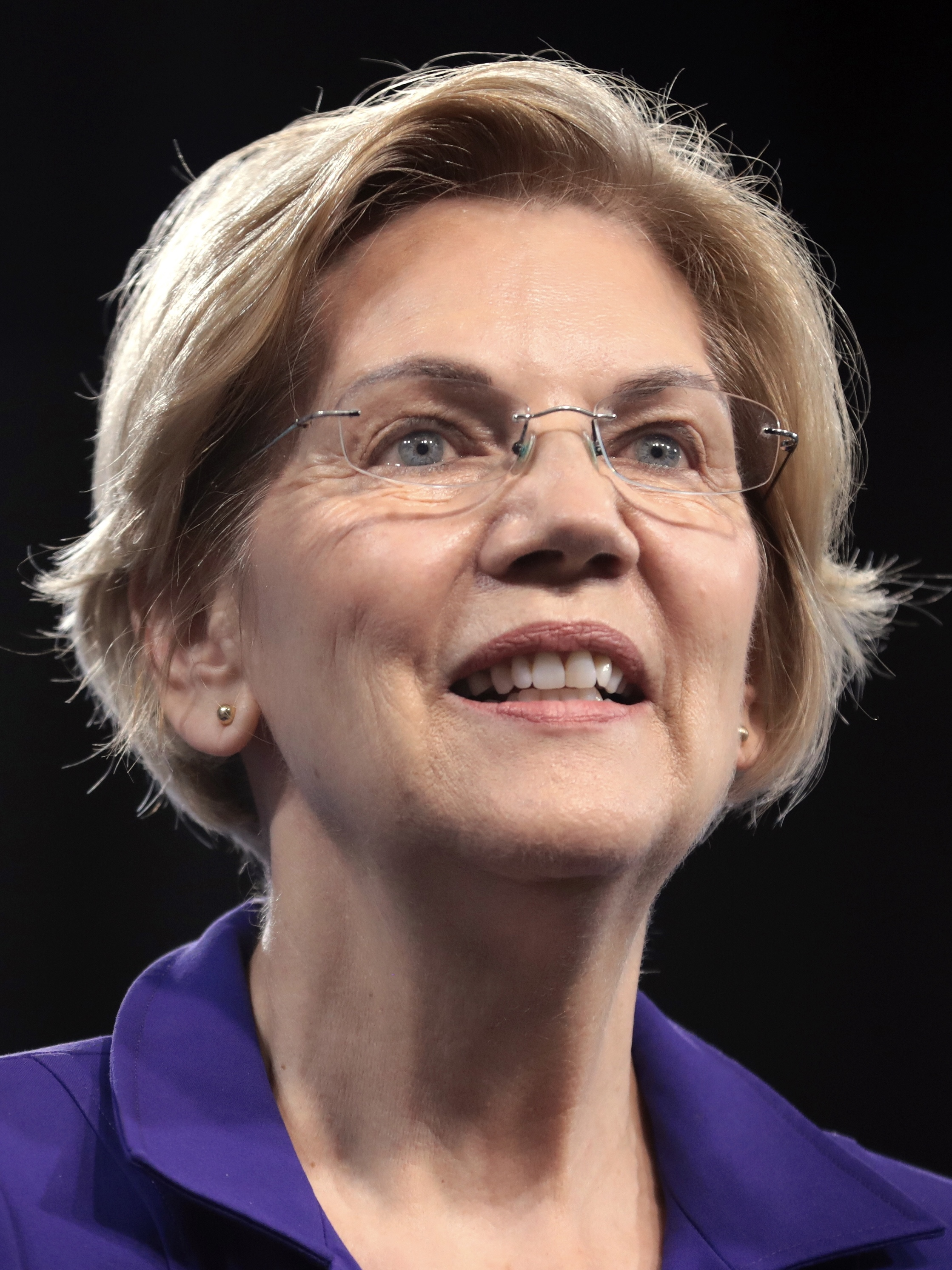
| Candidate | Joe Biden | Bernie Sanders |
| Home state | Delaware | Vermont |
| Delegate count | 113 | 99 |
| Popular vote | 725,562 | 626,339 |
| Percentage | 34.64% | 29.91% |
| Candidate | Michael Bloomberg | Elizabeth Warren |
| Home state | New York | Massachusetts |
| Delegate count | 11 | 5 |
| Popular vote | 300,608 | 239,237 |
| Percentage | 14.35% | 11.42% |
Biden
<30%
30–40%
40–50%
50–60%
60–70%
Sanders
<30%
30–40%
40–50%
50–60%
Bloomberg
<30%
30–40%
50–60%
Warren
<30%
Tie
Tie
Biden
<30%
30–40%
40–50%
50–60%
60–70%
70–80%
80–90%
90–100%
Sanders
<30%
30–40%
40–50%
50–60%
60–70%
70–80%
80–90%
90–100%
Warren
<30%
30–40%
40–50%
50–60%
60–70%
80–90%
90–100%
Bloomberg
<30%
30–40%
40–50%
50–60%
60–70%
70–80%
80–90%
90–100%
Klobuchar
40–50%
90–100%
Buttigieg
30–40%
40–50%
50–60%
90–100%
Others
Other candidates
Tie
No votes cast

The 2020 Texas Democratic presidential primary took place on March 3, 2020, as one of 15 contests scheduled on Super Tuesday in the Democratic Party primaries for the 2020 presidential election, following the South Carolina primary the weekend before. The Texas primary was an open primary, with the state awarding the second-largest amount of national convention delegates on Super Tuesday and third-largest amount overall: 260 delegates, of which 228 were pledged delegates allocated on the basis of the primary.

Prior to election day, senator Bernie Sanders had been ahead in Texas polling, even in spite of Joe Biden's powerful win in the South Carolina primary, and had hopes of establishing a commanding lead thanks to the high favorability Sanders had with the Latino electorate. With the support of several last-minute endorsements like those of Pete Buttigieg, Amy Klobuchar and Beto O'Rourke, in another "surprise win", former vice president Joe Biden topped the final results with 34.6% of the vote and 113 delegates, leading over Sanders (who got 99 delegates) by almost five points, and practically leveled his loss in California. Widely seen as a blow to Sanders, his failure to win Texas helped contribute to his depleting momentum and eventual loss of front-runner status after Super Tuesday. Former mayor Michael Bloomberg and senator Elizabeth Warren placed ahead in some counties and won several district delegates, but overall they missed the 15% threshold for statewide delegates.

== Procedure ==
Texas was one of 14 states and one territory holding primaries on March 3, 2020, also known as "Super Tuesday". Voting took place throughout the state from 7:00 a.m. until 7:00 p.m. local time. In the primary, candidates had to meet a threshold of 15 percent at the state senatorial district or statewide level in order to be considered viable (Texas was the only state to choose districts from state senate elections over congressional districts for delegate distribution). The 228 pledged delegates to the 2020 Democratic National Convention were allocated proportionally on the basis of the results of the primary. Of these, between 3 and 10 were allocated to each of the state's 31 state senatorial districts and another 30 allocated to party leaders and elected officials (PLEO delegates), in addition to 49 at-large delegates. The Super Tuesday primary as part of Stage I on the primary timetable received no bonus delegates, in order to disperse the primaries between more different date clusters and keep too many states from hoarding on the first shared date or on a March date in general.

After precinct, county, and senatorial district conventions on March 21, 2020, during which delegates to the state convention were nominated, the state convention was subsequently held between June 18 and June 20, 2020, to vote on the 49 at-large and 30 pledged PLEO delegates for the Democratic National Convention. The delegation also included 32 unpledged PLEO delegates: 19 members of the Democratic National Committee and 13 representatives from Congress.

Pledged national convention delegates
| Type | Del. | Type | Del. | Type | Del. |
|---|---|---|---|---|---|
| SD1 | 3 | SD12 | 5 | SD23 | 7 |
| SD2 | 4 | SD13 | 7 | SD24 | 3 |
| SD3 | 3 | SD14 | 10 | SD25 | 7 |
| SD4 | 4 | SD15 | 6 | SD26 | 6 |
| SD5 | 5 | SD16 | 6 | SD27 | 4 |
| SD6 | 4 | SD17 | 6 | SD28 | 2 |
| SD7 | 5 | SD18 | 4 | SD29 | 6 |
| SD8 | 6 | SD19 | 5 | SD30 | 3 |
| SD9 | 4 | SD20 | 4 | SD31 | 2 |
| SD10 | 6 | SD21 | 5 | PLEO | 30 |
| SD11 | 4 | SD22 | 3 | At-large | 49 |
| Total pledged delegates | | | | | 228 |

== Candidates ==
Filing for the primary began in early November 2019. The following candidates filed and were on the ballot in Texas:

Running

- Joe Biden
- Michael Bloomberg
- Roque "Rocky" De La Fuente III
- Tulsi Gabbard
- Bernie Sanders
- Elizabeth Warren
- Robby Wells

Withdrawn

- Michael Bennet
- Cory Booker
- Pete Buttigieg (Note: Candidate withdrew shortly before the primary after early voting had already started.)
- Julian Castro
- John Delaney
- Amy Klobuchar
- Deval Patrick
- Tom Steyer
- Marianne Williamson
- Andrew Yang

Kamala Harris had been accepted onto the ballot, but had withdrawn early so that she was not put on it.

== Polling ==
Polling Aggregation
| Source of poll aggregation | Date updated | Dates polled | Bernie Sanders | Joe Biden | Michael Bloomberg | Elizabeth Warren | Tulsi Gabbard | Other/ Undecided (Note: Calculated by taking the difference of 100% and all other candidates combined) |
|---|---|---|---|---|---|---|---|---|
| 270 to Win | Mar 2, 2020 | Feb 17-Mar 1, 2020 | 30.2% | 25.6% | 16.8% | 13.6% | 1.0% | 12.8% |
| RealClear Politics | Mar 2, 2020 | Feb 27-Mar 1, 2020 | 29.5% | 28.0% | 18.0% | 14.5% | 2.0% | 8.0% |
| FiveThirtyEight | March 3, 2020 | until March 2, 2020 (Note: FiveThirtyEight aggregates polls with a trendline regression of polls rather than a strict average of recent polls.) | 28.2% | 25.5% | 16.5% | 13.3% | 0.4% | 16.1% |
| Average | | | 29.0% | 26.5% | 17.1% | 13.8% | 0.9% | 12.6% |
| Texas primary results (March 3, 2020) | | | 30.0% | 34.5% | 14.4% | 11.4% | 0.4% | 9.3% |

Polling from January 1, 2020, to March 3, 2020
| Poll source | Date(s) administered | Sample size (Note: Key: A – all adults RV – registered voters LV – likely voters V – unclear) | Margin of error | Joe Biden | Michael Bloomberg | Pete Buttigieg | Amy Klobuchar | Bernie Sanders | Elizabeth Warren | Andrew Yang | Other | Undecided |
|---|---|---|---|---|---|---|---|---|---|---|---|---|
| | Mar 2, 2020 | Klobuchar withdraws from the race | | | | | | | | | | |
| Swayable | Mar 1–2, 2020 | 1,378 (LV) | ± 3.0% | 27% | 20% | 5% | 3% | 28% | 12% | – | 6% (Note: Steyer with 3%; Gabbard with no voters; "Other" with 3%) | – |
| Data for Progress | Feb 28–Mar 2, 2020 | 300 (LV) | ± 5.7% | 30% | 20% | 4% | 3% | 28% | 15% | – | 1% (Note: Gabbard with 1%) | – |
| AtlasIntel | Feb 24-Mar 2, 2020 | 486 (LV) | ± 4.0% | 25% | 16% | 5% | 3% | 35% | 9% | – | 3% (Note: Gabbard with 1%; "Other" with 2%) | 4% |
| | Mar 1, 2020 | Buttigieg withdraws from the race | | | | | | | | | | |
| Emerson College/Nexstar | Feb 29-Mar 1, 2020 | 450 (LV) | ± 4.6% | 26% | 16% | 5% | 4% | 31% | 14% | – | 5% (Note: Gabbard with 3%; Steyer with 2%) | – |
| Elucd | Feb 26-Mar 1, 2020 | 833 (LV) | ± 3.4% | 20% | 14% | 7% | 5% | 31% | 13% | – | – | 11% |
| YouGov/CBS News | Feb 27–29, 2020 | 635 (LV) | ± 6.2% | 26% | 13% | 6% | 6% | 30% | 17% | – | 2% (Note: Steyer with 1%; Gabbard with 0%; "Someone else" with 1%) | – |
| Marist College | Feb 23–27, 2020 | 556 (LV) | ± 5.3% | 19% | 15% | 8% | 3% | 34% | 10% | – | 2% (Note: Steyer and Gabbard with 1%; "Other" with <1%) | 9% |
| Marist College | Feb 23–27, 2020 | 1,050 (RV) | ± 3.7% | 18% | 16% | 8% | 3% | 35% | 8% | – | 3% (Note: Steyer with 2%; Gabbard with 1%; "Other" with <1%) | 9% |
| Data for Progress | Feb 23–27, 2020 | 513 (LV) | ± 4.3% | 21% | 21% | 9% | 5% | 30% | 13% | – | 2% (Note: Gabbard and Steyer with 1%) | – |
| CNN/SSRS | Feb 22–26, 2020 | 387 (LV) | ± 6.0% | 20% | 18% | 8% | 3% | 29% | 15% | – | 0% | 5% (Note: None/No one 1%; No opinion 4%) |
| Latino Decisions/Univision/ University of Houston | Feb 21–26, 2020 | 527 (LV) | ± 4.3% | 20% | 20% | 6% | 2% | 26% | 11% | – | 7% (Note: Steyer with 2%; Gabbard and Patrick with 1%; Bennet with 0%; "Other" with 3%) | 6% |
| University of Texas at Tyler | Feb 17–26, 2020 | 586 (LV) | ± 4.1% | 19% | 21% | 8% | 4% | 29% | 10% | – | 2% (Note: Gabbard and Steyer with 1%) | 5% |
| Public Policy Polling/Progress Texas | Feb 24–25, 2020 | 1,045 (LV) | ± 3.0% | 31% | – (Note: Respondents were asked who they would vote for if Bloomberg were not a candidate.) | 11% | 7% | 25% | 17% | – | 4% (Note: Steyer with 3%; Gabbard with 1%) | 5% (Note: Reported as "Someone else/Undecided") |
| Public Policy Polling/Progress Texas | Feb 24–25, 2020 | 1,045 (LV) | ± 3.0% | 24% | 17% | 10% | 4% | 24% | 14% | – | 2% (Note: Gabbard and Steyer with 1%) | 5% (Note: Reported as "Someone else/Undecided") |
| | Feb 22, 2020 | Nevada caucuses | | | | | | | | | | |
| University of Massachusetts Lowell | Feb 12–18, 2020 | 600 (LV) | ± 5.9% | 20% | 18% | 7% | 9% | 23% | 14% | – | 6% (Note: Gabbard with 4%; Steyer with 2%; "Another candidate" with 0%) | 3% |
| YouGov/University of Houston | Feb 6–18, 2020 | 1,352 (LV) | ± 2.7% | 20% | 12% | 11% | 7% | 20% | 17% | – | 8% (Note: Gabbard with 3%; Steyer with 1%; "No one/None of them" with 4%) | 5% |
| | Feb 11, 2020 | New Hampshire primary; Yang withdraws from the race | | | | | | | | | | |
| YouGov/University of Texas/Texas Tribune | Jan 31-Feb 9, 2020 | 575 (LV) | ± 4.09% | 22% | 10% | 7% | 3% | 24% | 15% | 6% | 13% (Note: Steyer with 3%; Gabbard with 2%; others with 8%) | – |
| University of Texas At Tyler/Dallas News | Jan 21–30, 2020 | 372 (LV) | ± 4.8% | 34% | 16% | 4% | 3% | 18% | 17% | 3% | 5% (Note: Steyer with 2%; Bennet, Delaney and Gabbard with 1%; Patrick with <1%) | – |
| Data for Progress (Note: By the time of the sampling period, Data for Progress had endorsed the Elizabeth Warren 2020 presidential campaign) | Jan 16–21, 2020 | 615 (LV) | ± 6.5% | 26% | 7% | 10% | 4% | 20% | 14% | 3% | 3% (Note: Steyer with 2%; Bennet with 1%; De La Fuente, Delaney, Gabbard and Patrick with 0%) | 12% |
| Texas Lyceum | Jan 10–19, 2020 | 401 (LV) | ± 4.89% | 28% | 9% | 6% | 4% | 26% | 13% | 0% | 5% (Note: Gabbard and Steyer with 2%; Booker with 1%; Bennet, Delaney, Patrick and Williamson with 0%; "none of the above" with 4%) | 7% |
| | Jan 13, 2020 | Booker withdraws from the race | | | | | | | | | | |
| | Jan 2, 2020 | Castro withdraws from the race | | | | | | | | | | |

Polling before January 2020
| Poll source | Date(s) administered | Sample size | Margin of error | Joe Biden | Cory Booker | Pete Buttigieg | Julian Castro | Kamala Harris | Amy Klobuchar | Beto O'Rourke | Bernie Sanders | Elizabeth Warren | Andrew Yang | Other | Undecided |
|---|---|---|---|---|---|---|---|---|---|---|---|---|---|---|---|
| CNN/SSRS | Dec 4–8, 2019 | 327 (LV) | ± 6.6% | 35% | 2% | 9% | 3% | – | 1% | – | 15% | 13% | 3% | 11% (Note: Bloomberg with 5%; Steyer with 2%; Bennet, Gabbard, and Patrick with 1%; Delaney and Williamson with 0%; "Someone else" with 1%) | 9% |
| | Dec 3, 2019 | Harris withdraws from the race | | | | | | | | | | | | | |
| | Nov 24, 2019 | Bloomberg announces his candidacy | | | | | | | | | | | | | |
| University of Texas at Tyler | Nov 5–14, 2019 | 427 (RV) | ± 4.7% | 28% | 1% | 8% | 3% | 5% | 2% | – | 18% | 19% | 2% | 4% (Note: Steyer with 2%; Gabbard, Sestak and Williamson with 1%; Delaney with 0; Bennet, Bullock, and Messam with no voters) | – |
| | Nov 1, 2019 | O'Rourke withdraws from the race | | | | | | | | | | | | | |
| University of Texas/ Texas Tribune | Oct 18–27, 2019 | 541 | ± 4.2% | 23% | 1% | 6% | 2% | 5% | 2% | 14% | 12% | 18% | 4% | 4% (Note: Gabbard with 2%; Steyer and Williamson with 1%; Bennet, Bullock, Delaney, Messam and Sestak with 0%) | 5% |
| University of Texas at Tyler | Sep 13–15, 2019 | 474 (RV) | ± 4.5% | 28% | 6% | 4% | 4% | 6% | 0% | 19% | 17% | 11% | 1% | 5% (Note: Bennet, Bullock, Delaney, Messam and Steyer with 1%; de Blasio, Gabbard, Ryan, Sestak, and Williamson with 0%) | – |
| Texas Tribune | Aug 29–Sep 15, 2019 | 550 | ± 4.2% | 26% | 1% | 4% | 3% | 5% | 1% | 14% | 12% | 18% | 3% | 4% (Note: Gabbard with 2%; Ryan and Williamson with 1%; rest with 0%) | 6% |
| Quinnipiac University | Sep 4–9, 2019 | 456 | ± 5.5% | 28% | 1% | 3% | 3% | 5% | 2% | 12% | 12% | 18% | 1 | 1% (Note: Delaney with 1%; Bennet, de Blasio, Bullock, Gabbard, Messam, Ryan, Sestak, Steyer and Williamson with 0%; would not vote with 1%) | 12% |
| Univision/University of Houston | Aug 31– Sep 6, 2019 | 1004 (RV) | ± 4.5% | 20% | 3% | 1% | 12% | 5% | – | 19% | 13% | 12% | 1% | 4% (Note: Steyer, Gabbard, Bennet, Delaney with 1%; Rest with 0%) | 10% |
| Ragnar Research | Sep 3–5, 2019 | 600 | ± 3.9% | 23% | 1% | 6% | 2% | 7% | – | 12% | 12% | 15% | – (Note: Not listed separately) | 7% (Note: Gabbard with 4%) | 18% |
| Climate Nexus | Aug 20–25, 2019 | 639 | – | 24% | 2% | 3% | 3% | 7% | – | 21% | 12% | 12% | 1% | 5% (Note: Gabbard, Ryan, Steyer, Delaney and Williamson with 1%; rest with 0%) | 9% |
| TEXAS LYCEUM | Aug 16–25, 2019 | 358 | ± 5.2% | 24% | 2% | 3% | 4% | 4% | 3% | 18% | 13% | 15% | 2% | 8% (Note: Bullock with 2%; Gabbard, Ryan, Bennet, McAuliffe, Moulton, Williamson with 1%; rest with 0%) | 2% |
| Emerson College | Aug 1–3, 2019 | 400 | ± 4.9% | 28% | 2% | 7% | 2% | 5% | <1% | 19% | 16% | 14% | 3% | 5% (Note: Bennet, Gabbard, Messam, Ryan with 1%; de Blasio, Gillibrand, Sestak, Steyer, and Williamson with <1%; "someone else" with 1%) | – |
| YouGov/CBS News | Jul 9–18, 2019 | 910 | ± 4.2% | 27% | 0% | 4% | 4% | 12% | 1% | 17% | 12% | 16% | 1% | 6% (Note: Delaney, Gabbard, Gillibrand, and Ryan with 1%; Bennet, Bullock, de Blasio, Gravel, Hickenlooper, Inslee, Messam, Moulton, Sestak, Steyer, and Williamson with 0%) | – |
| YouGov/University of Texas | May 31 – Jun 9, 2019 | 483 | ± 5.0% | 23% | 1% | 8% | 3% | 5% | 1% | 15% | 12% | 14% | 0% | 8% (Note: Gabbard with 3%; Delaney, Gillibrand, Inslee, and Swalwell with 1%; Bennet, Bullock, de Blasio, Hickenlooper, Messam, Moulton, Ryan and Williamson with 0%; others with 1%) | 7% |
| Quinnipiac University | May 29 – Jun 4, 2019 | 407 | ± 5.8% | 30% | 1% | 3% | 4% | 4% | <1% | 16% | 15% | 11% | 1% | 5% (Note: Delaney with 2%; Hickenlooper, Ryan, and Williamson with 1%; Bennet, Bullock, de Blasio, Gabbard, Gillibrand, Inslee, Messam, Moulton, and Swalwell with <1%) | 8% |
| Change Research | May 30 – Jun 3, 2019 | 1,218 | ± 2.8% | 24% | 1% | 8% | 2% | 8% | 1% | 27% | 13% | 12% | 1% | 2% (Note: Abrams with 2%; Bennet, de Blasio, Delaney, Gabbard, Gravel, Hickenlooper, Inslee, McAuliffe, Swalwell, and Williamson with 0%) | – |
| Emerson College | Apr 25–28, 2019 | 342 | ± 5.3% | 23% | 1% | 8% | 4% | 3% | 3% | 22% | 17% | 7% | 3% | 11% (Note: Delaney, Gillibrand, Gravel and Hickenlooper with 1%; Messam, Ryan, Swalwell and Williamson with 0%; "someone else" with 7%) | – |
| | Apr 25, 2019 | Biden announces his candidacy | | | | | | | | | | | | | |
| Change Research | Apr 18–22, 2019 | 1,578 | ± 2.5% | 20% | 2% | 15% | 4% | 5% | 1% | 25% | 19% | 5% | 1% | 2% (Note: Abrams and Swalwell with 1%; Gabbard, Gillibrand, Hickenlooper, Inslee, and Ryan with 0%) | – |
| Change Research | Apr 18–22, 2019 | 1,578 | ± 2.5% | – | 4% | 21% | 5% | 8% | 1% | 33% | 23% | 5% | 0% | 0% (Note: Delaney, Gabbard, Gillibrand, Gravel, Hickenlooper, Inslee, Ryan and Williamson with 0%) | – |

== Results ==
Results by county, showing the candidate receiving the most votes in each county. Joe Biden Bernie Sanders Michael Bloomberg Elizabeth Warren Tie

2020 Texas Democratic presidential primary
| Candidate | Votes | % | Delegates |
|---|---|---|---|
| Joe Biden | 725,562 | 34.64 | 113 |
| Bernie Sanders | 626,339 | 29.91 | 99 |
| Michael Bloomberg | 300,608 | 14.35 | 11 |
| Elizabeth Warren | 239,237 | 11.42 | 5 |
| Pete Buttigieg (withdrawn) | 82,671 | 3.95 | |
| Amy Klobuchar (withdrawn) | 43,291 | 2.07 | |
| Julian Castro (withdrawn) | 16,688 | 0.80 | |
| Tom Steyer (withdrawn) | 13,929 | 0.67 | |
| Michael Bennet (withdrawn) | 10,324 | 0.49 | |
| Tulsi Gabbard | 8,688 | 0.41 | |
| Andrew Yang (withdrawn) | 6,674 | 0.32 | |
| Cory Booker (withdrawn) | 4,941 | 0.24 | |
| Marianne Williamson (withdrawn) | 3,918 | 0.19 | |
| John Delaney (withdrawn) | 3,280 | 0.16 | |
| Deval Patrick (withdrawn) | 1,304 | 0.06 | |
| Other candidates | 6,974 | 0.33 | |
| Total | 2,094,428 | 100% | 228 |

=== Results by county ===
† - candidates who withdrew prior to early voting, but appeared on the ballot
‡ - candidates who withdrew after early voting had started

The winner in each county is denoted by bold.

| County | Biden | % | Bloomberg | % | Buttigieg‡ | % | Gabbard | % | Klobuchar‡ | % | Sanders | % | Steyer‡ | % | Warren | % | Others† | % | Total votes | Turnout in % |
|---|---|---|---|---|---|---|---|---|---|---|---|---|---|---|---|---|---|---|---|---|
| Anderson | 753 | 47.96 | 295 | 18.79 | 41 | 2.61 | 5 | 0.32 | 21 | 1.34 | 333 | 21.21 | 21 | 1.34 | 69 | 4.39 | 32 (Note: Bennet - 1 Booker - 8 Castro - 7 De La Fuente - 6 Wells - 6 Williamson - 1 Yang - 3) | 2.03 (Note: Bennet - 0.06 Booker - 0.51 Castro - 0.45 De La Fuente - 0.38 Wells - 0.38 Williamson - 0.06 Yang - 0.19) | 1,570 | 5.57 |
| Andrews | 81 | 35.06 | 33 | 14.29 | 3 | 1.30 | 0 | 0.00 | 2 | 0.87 | 84 | 36.36 | 2 | 0.87 | 22 | 9.52 | 4 (Note: Booker - 1 Castro - 2 Yang - 1) | 1.73 (Note: Booker - 0.43 Castro - 0.87 Yang - 0.43) | 231 | 2.32 |
| Angelina | 1,632 | 50.57 | 465 | 14.41 | 80 | 2.48 | 13 | 0.40 | 73 | 2.26 | 648 | 20.08 | 16 | 0.50 | 213 | 6.60 | 87 (Note: Bennet - 10 Booker - 3 Castro - 17 De La Fuente - 11 Delaney - 8 Patrick - 9 Wells - 5 Williamson - 15 Yang - 9) | 2.69 (Note: Bennet - 0.31 Booker - 0.09 Castro - 0.53 De La Fuente - 0.34 Delaney - 0.25 Patrick - 0.28 Wells - 0.15 Williamson - 0.46 Yang - 0.28) | 3,227 | 6.25 |
| Aransas | 502 | 42.65 | 176 | 14.95 | 67 | 5.69 | 5 | 0.42 | 55 | 4.67 | 222 | 18.86 | 3 | 0.25 | 128 | 10.88 | 19 (Note: Castro - 1 De La Fuente - 7 Patrick - 3 Wells - 1 Williamson - 2 Yang - 5) | 1.59 (Note: Castro - 0.08 De La Fuente - 0.59 Patrick - 0.25 Wells - 0.08 Williamson - 0.17 Yang - 0.42) | 1,177 | 6.78 |
| Archer | 92 | 42.01 | 38 | 17.35 | 13 | 5.94 | 1 | 0.46 | 15 | 6.85 | 36 | 16.44 | 1 | 0.46 | 21 | 9.59 | 2 (Note: Booker - 1 De La Fuente - 1) | 0.92 (Note: Booker - 0.46 De La Fuente - 0.46) | 219 | 3.46 |
| Armstrong | 11 | 39.29 | 4 | 14.29 | 0 | 0.00 | 1 | 3.57 | 1 | 3.57 | 10 | 35.71 | 1 | 3.57 | 0 | 0.00 | 0 | 0.00 | 28 | 1.94 |
| Atascosa | 800 | 29.38 | 585 | 21.48 | 76 | 2.79 | 10 | 0.37 | 41 | 1.51 | 736 | 27.03 | 51 | 1.87 | 207 | 7.60 | 217 (Note: Bennet - 14 Booker - 2 Castro - 142 De La Fuente - 25 Delaney - 6 Patrick - 3 Wells - 5 Williamson - 9 Yang - 11) | 7.95 (Note: Bennet - 0.51 Booker - 0.07 Castro - 5.21 De La Fuente - 0.92 Delaney - 0.22 Patrick - 0.11 Wells - 0.18 Williamson - 0.33 Yang - 0.40) | 2,723 | 9.69 |
| Austin | 460 | 44.9 | 205 | 19.96 | 33 | 3.21 | 4 | 0.39 | 22 | 2.14 | 214 | 20.84 | 18 | 1.75 | 54 | 5.26 | 17 (Note: Bennet - 1 Booker - 2 Castro - 3 De La Fuente - 0 Delaney - 2 Patrick - 2 Wells - 3 Williamson - 2 Yang - 2) | 1.63 (Note: Bennet - 0.10 Booker - 0.19 Castro - 0.29 De La Fuente - 0.00 Delaney - 0.19 Patrick - 0.19 Wells - 0.29 Williamson - 0.19 Yang - 0.19) | 1,027 | 5.22 |
| Bailey | 47 | 40.17 | 15 | 12.82 | 4 | 3.42 | 1 | 0.85 | 0 | 0.00 | 34 | 29.06 | 2 | 1.71 | 11 | 9.40 | 3 (Note: De La Fuente - 2 Delaney - 1) | 2.56 (Note: De La Fuente - 1.71 Delaney - 0.85) | 117 | 3.34 |
| Bandera | 443 | 38.72 | 170 | 14.86 | 60 | 5.24 | 1 | 0.09 | 42 | 3.67 | 281 | 24.56 | 10 | 0.87 | 123 | 10.75 | 14 (Note: Castro - 1 De La Fuente - 1 Wells - 1 Williamson - 7 Yang - 4) | 1.23 (Note: Castro - 0.09 De La Fuente - 0.09 Wells - 0.09 Williamson - 0.61 Yang - 0.35) | 1,144 | 7.03 |
| Bastrop | 2,365 | 32.13 | 1,000 | 13.59 | 323 | 4.39 | 27 | 0.37 | 223 | 3.03 | 2,274 | 30.89 | 85 | 1.15 | 998 | 13.56 | 66 (Note: Bennet - 7 Booker - 9 Castro - 14 De La Fuente - 5 Delaney - 8 Patrick - 5 Wells - 2 Williamson - 1 Yang - 15) | 0.90 (Note: Bennet - 0.10 Booker - 0.12 Castro - 0.19 De La Fuente - 0.07 Delaney - 0.11 Patrick - 0.07 Wells - 0.03 Williamson - 0.01 Yang - 0.20) | 7,361 | 15.04 |
| Baylor | 27 | 41.54 | 19 | 29.23 | 0 | 0.00 | 2 | 3.08 | 2 | 3.08 | 5 | 7.69 | 2 | 3.08 | 6 | 9.23 | 2 (Note: Wells - 1 Yang - 1) | 3.08 (Note: Wells - 1.54 Yang - 1.54) | 65 | 2.80 |
| Bee | 490 | 44.26 | 173 | 15.63 | 20 | 1.81 | 8 | 0.72 | 19 | 1.72 | 238 | 21.50 | 17 | 1.54 | 81 | 7.32 | 61 (Note: Bennet - 10 Castro - 31 De La Fuente - 6 Delaney - 3 Patrick - 1 Williamson - 6 Yang - 4) | 5.50 (Note: Bennet - 0.90 Castro - 2.80 De La Fuente - 0.54 Delaney - 0.27 Patrick - 0.09 Williamson - 0.54 Yang - 0.36) | 1,107 | 7.07 |
| Bell | 7,793 | 43.04 | 2,434 | 13.44 | 652 | 3.60 | 74 | 0.41 | 338 | 1.87 | 4,774 | 26.37 | 76 | 0.42 | 1,693 | 9.35 | 271 (Note: Bennet - 31 Booker - 34 Castro - 43 De La Fuente - 16 Delaney - 21 Patrick - 8 Wells - 12 Williamson - 39 Yang - 67) | 1.51 (Note: Bennet - 0.17 Booker - 0.19 Castro - 0.24 De La Fuente - 0.09 Delaney - 0.12 Patrick - 0.04 Wells - 0.07 Williamson - 0.22 Yang - 0.37) | 18,105 | 8.99 |
| Bexar | 48,923 | 28.65 | 26,031 | 15.24 | 7,432 | 4.35 | 566 | 0.33 | 4,112 | 2.41 | 56,763 | 33.24 | 1,261 | 0.74 | 21,046 | 12.32 | 4,628 (Note: Bennet - 231 Booker - 190 Castro - 3,258 De La Fuente - 193 Delaney - 80 Patrick - 43 Wells - 63 Williamson - 98 Yang - 472) | 2.73 (Note: Bennet - 0.14 Booker - 0.11 Castro - 1.91 De La Fuente - 0.11 Delaney - 0.05 Patrick - 0.03 Wells - 0.04 Williamson - 0.06 Yang - 0.28) | 170,762 | 15.09 |
| Blanco | 375 | 36.06 | 142 | 13.65 | 65 | 6.25 | 2 | 0.19 | 39 | 3.75 | 240 | 23.08 | 10 | 0.96 | 164 | 15.77 | 3 (Note: Bennet - 1 Castro - 1 Yang - 1) | 0.30 (Note: Bennet - 0.10 Castro - 0.10 Yang - 0.10) | 1,040 | 11.89 |
| Borden | 2 | 33.33 | 2 | 33.33 | 0 | 0.00 | 0 | 0.00 | 1 | 16.67 | 1 | 16.67 | 0 | 0.00 | 0 | 0.00 | 0 | 0 | 6 | 1.24 |
| Bosque | 293 | 40.98 | 114 | 15.94 | 17 | 2.38 | 3 | 0.42 | 25 | 3.50 | 172 | 24.06 | 12 | 1.68 | 69 | 9.65 | 10 (Note: Bennet - 2 Castro - 1 De La Fuente - 1 Delaney - 4 Wells - 1 Williamson - 1) | 1.40 (Note: Bennet - 0.28 Castro - 0.14 De La Fuente - 0.14 Delaney - 0.56 Wells - 0.14 Williamson - 0.14) | 715 | 5.86 |
| Bowie | 2,066 | 56.00 | 487 | 13.20 | 70 | 1.90 | 10 | 0.27 | 46 | 1.25 | 700 | 18.98 | 27 | 0.73 | 215 | 5.83 | 68 (Note: Bennet - 15 Booker - 11 Castro - 2 Delaney - 7 Patrick - 3 Wells - 4 Williamson - 19 Yang - 7) | 1.85 (Note: Bennet - 0.41 Booker - 0.30 Castro - 0.05 Delaney - 0.19 Patrick - 0.08 Wells - 0.11 Williamson - 0.52 Yang - 0.19) | 3,689 | 6.21 |
| Brazoria | 8,839 | 40.81 | 3,119 | 14.40 | 759 | 3.50 | 101 | 0.47 | 488 | 2.25 | 5,840 | 26.96 | 123 | 0.57 | 2,159 | 9.97 | 2.33 (Note: Bennet - 68 Booker - 21 Castro - 21 De La Fuente - 30 Delaney - 5 Patrick - 4 Wells - 3 Williamson - 10 Yang - 71) | 1.08 (Note: Bennet - 0.31 Booker - 0.10 Castro - 0.10 De La Fuente - 0.14 Delaney - 0.02 Patrick - 0.02 Wells - 0.01 Williamson - 0.05 Yang - 0.33) | 21,661 | 10.16 |
| Brazos | 4,090 | 31.59 | 998 | 7.71 | 439 | 3.39 | 64 | 0.49 | 304 | 2.35 | 4,740 | 36.61 | 82 | 0.63 | 1,976 | 15.26 | 253 (Note: Bennet - 60 Booker - 61 Castro - 14 De La Fuente - 6 Delaney - 1 Patrick - 1 Wells - 23 Williamson - 6 Yang - 81) | 1.97 (Note: Bennet - 0.46 Booker - 0.47 Castro - 0.11 De La Fuente - 0.05 Delaney - 0.01 Patrick - 0.01 Wells - 0.18 Williamson - 0.05 Yang - 0.63) | 12,946 | 11.06 |
| Brewster | 343 | 26.18 | 156 | 11.91 | 57 | 4.35 | 14 | 1.07 | 41 | 3.13 | 410 | 31.30 | 5 | 0.38 | 245 | 18.70 | 39 (Note: Bennet - 4 Booker - 4 Castro - 10 De La Fuente - 6 Delaney - 3 Patrick - 2 Wells - 1 Williamson - 3 Yang - 6) | 2.99 (Note: Bennet - 0.31 Booker - 0.31 Castro - 0.76 De La Fuente - 0.46 Delaney - 0.23 Patrick - 0.15 Wells - 0.08 Williamson - 0.23 Yang - 0.46) | 1,310 | 18.18 |
| Briscoe | 9 | 26.47 | 5 | 14.71 | 3 | 8.82 | 0 | 0.00 | 2 | 5.88 | 4 | 11.76 | 1 | 2.94 | 7 | 20.59 | 3 (Note: Castro - 1 De La Fuente - 2) | 8.82 (Note: Castro - 2.94 De La Fuente - 5.88) | 34 | 3.32 |
| Brooks | 289 | 18.63 | 424 | 27.34 | 41 | 2.64 | 21 | 1.35 | 25 | 1.61 | 522 | 33.66 | 10 | 0.64 | 65 | 4.19 | 154 (Note: Bennet - 18 Booker - 3 Castro - 46 De La Fuente - 52 Delaney - 10 Patrick - 2 Wells - 12 Williamson - 7 Yang - 4) | 9.92 (Note: Bennet - 1.16 Booker - 0.19 Castro - 2.97 De La Fuente - 3.35 Delaney - 0.64 Patrick - 0.13 Wells - 0.77 Williamson - 0.45 Yang - 0.26) | 1,551 | 28.03 |
| Brown | 366 | 48.16 | 69 | 9.08 | 38 | 5.00 | 3 | 0.39 | 14 | 1.84 | 183 | 24.08 | 12 | 1.58 | 66 | 8.68 | 9 (Note: Bennet - 1 Booker - 2 Castro - 2 De La Fuente - 1 Patrick - 1 Williamson - 2) | 1.17 (Note: Bennet - 0.13 Booker - 0.26 Castro - 0.26 De La Fuente - 0.13 Patrick - 0.13 Williamson - 0.26) | 760 | 3.26 |
| Burleson | 378 | 50.53 | 149 | 19.92 | 18 | 2.41 | 2 | 0.27 | 17 | 2.27 | 122 | 16.31 | 2 | 0.27 | 44 | 5.88 | 16 (Note: Bennet - 2 Booker - 2 Castro - 1 De La Fuente - 1 Delaney - 4 Patrick - 1 Williamson - 3 Yang - 2) | 2.13 (Note: Bennet - 0.27 Booker - 0.27 Castro - 0.13 De La Fuente - 0.13 Delaney - 0.53 Patrick - 0.13 Williamson - 0.40 Yang - 0.27) | 748 | 6.29 |
| Burnet | 1,021 | 39.54 | 429 | 16.62 | 117 | 4.53 | 13 | 0.50 | 90 | 3.49 | 575 | 22.27 | 21 | 0.81 | 287 | 11.12 | 29 (Note: Bennet - 2 Booker - 2 Castro - 7 De La Fuente - 1 Delaney - 8 Patrick - 1 Wells - 3 Williamson - 2 Yang - 3) | 1.14 (Note: Bennet - 0.08 Booker - 0.08 Castro - 0.27 De La Fuente - 0.04 Delaney - 0.31 Patrick - 0.04 Wells - 0.12 Williamson - 0.08 Yang - 0.12) | 2,582 | 8.11 |
| Caldwell | 978 | 32.73 | 431 | 14.42 | 111 | 3.71 | 10 | 0.33 | 70 | 2.34 | 955 | 31.96 | 32 | 1.07 | 320 | 10.71 | 81 (Note: Bennet - 8 Booker - 2 Castro - 38 De La Fuente - 7 Delaney - 4 Patrick - 4 Wells - 3 Williamson - 3 Yang - 12) | 2.70 (Note: Bennet - 0.27 Booker - 0.07 Castro - 1.27 De La Fuente - 0.23 Delaney - 0.13 Patrick - 0.13 Wells - 0.10 Williamson - 0.10 Yang - 0.40) | 2,988 | 11.90 |
| Calhoun | 427 | 46.01 | 159 | 17.13 | 26 | 2.80 | 6 | 0.65 | 15 | 1.62 | 191 | 20.58 | 12 | 1.29 | 71 | 7.65 | 21 (Note: Bennet - 3 Booker - 5 Castro - 5 De La Fuente - 3 Delaney - 2 Williamson - 1 Yang - 2) | 2.27 (Note: Bennet - 0.32 Booker - 0.54 Castro - 0.54 De La Fuente - 0.32 Delaney - 0.22 Williamson - 0.11 Yang - 0.22) | 928 | 7.30 |
| Callahan | 119 | 47.22 | 14 | 5.56 | 8 | 3.17 | 0 | 0.00 | 5 | 1.98 | 74 | 29.37 | 5 | 1.98 | 20 | 7.94 | 7 (Note: Bennet - 1 Castro - 1 De La Fuente - 3 Delaney - Wells - 1 Williamson - 1) | 2.79 (Note: Bennet - 0.40 Castro - 0.40 De La Fuente - 1.19 Wells - 0.40 Williamson - 0.40) | 252 | 2.67 |
| Cameron | 7,508 | 23.95 | 6,355 | 20.27 | 1,154 | 3.68 | 325 | 1.04 | 593 | 1.89 | 10,470 | 33.39 | 255 | 0.81 | 1,947 | 6.21 | 2,735 (Note: Bennet - 285 Booker - 74 Castro - 962 De La Fuente - 604 Delaney - 339 Patrick - 108 Wells - 73 Williamson - 85 Yang - 205) | 8.75 (Note: Bennet - 0.91 Booker - 0.24 Castro - 3.07 De La Fuente - 1.93 Delaney - 1.08 Patrick - 0.34 Wells - 0.23 Williamson - 0.30 Yang - 0.65) | 31,352 | 14.67 |
| Camp | 350 | 52.63 | 114 | 17.14 | 18 | 2.71 | 5 | 0.75 | 12 | 1.80 | 120 | 18.05 | 5 | 0.75 | 31 | 4.66 | 10 (Note: Bennet - 5 Booker - 1 De La Fuente - 1 Delaney - 1 Wells - 1 Williamson - 1) | 1.50 (Note: Bennet - 0.75 Booker - 0.15 De La Fuente - 0.15 Delaney - 0.15 Wells - 0.15 Williamson - 0.15) | 665 | 8.66 |
| Carson | 66 | 49.62 | 18 | 13.53 | 4 | 3.01 | 2 | 1.50 | 1 | 0.75 | 25 | 18.80 | 0 | 0.00 | 14 | 10.53 | 3 (Note: Bennet - 1 De La Fuente - 1 Yang - 1) | 2.25 (Note: Bennet - 0.75 De La Fuente - 0.75 Yang - 0.75) | 133 | 3.11 |
| Cass | 620 | 53.3 | 150 | 13.00 | 17 | 1.47 | 52 | 4.51 | 17 | 1.47 | 202 | 17.50 | 21 | 1.82 | 48 | 4.18 | 27 (Note: Bennet - 6 Booker - 7 Castro - 3 Delaney - 4 Patrick - 1 Wells - 1 Williamson - 2 Yang - 3) | 2.35 (Note: Bennet - 0.52 Booker - 0.61 Castro - 0.26 Delaney - 0.35 Patrick - 0.09 Wells - 0.09 Williamson - 0.17 Yang - 0.26) | 1,154 | 5.70 |
| Castro | 51 | 30.18 | 60 | 35.50 | 1 | 0.59 | 5 | 2.96 | 4 | 2.37 | 32 | 18.93 | 0 | 0.00 | 10 | 5.92 | 6 (Note: Castro - 1 Delaney - 1 Patrick - 1 Wells - 2 Yang - 1) | 3.54 (Note: Castro - 0.59 Delaney - 0.59 Patrick - 0.59 Wells - 1.18 Yang - 0.59) | 169 | 4.43 |
| Chambers | 500 | 40.45 | 183 | 14.81 | 47 | 3.80 | 4 | 0.32 | 32 | 2.59 | 337 | 27.27 | 17 | 1.38 | 95 | 7.69 | 21 (Note: Bennet - 2 Booker - 4 Delaney - 6 Wells - 1 Williamson - 4 Yang - 4) | 1.69 (Note: Bennet - 0.16 Booker - 0.32 Delaney - 0.49 Wells - 0.08 Williamson - 0.32 Yang - 0.32) | 1,236 | 4.23 |
| Cherokee | 836 | 51.35 | 268 | 16.46 | 36 | 2.21 | 5 | 0.31 | 46 | 2.83 | 299 | 18.23 | 10 | 0.61 | 108 | 6.63 | 22 (Note: Bennet - 5 Booker - 1 Castro - 8 De La Fuente - 1 Patrick - 2 Wells - 2 Williamson - 1 Yang - 2) | 1.34 (Note: Bennet - 0.31 Booker - 0.06 Castro - 0.49 De La Fuente - 0.06 Patrick - 0.12 Wells - 0.12 Williamson - 0.06 Yang - 0.12) | 1,640 | 5.81 |
| Childress | 52 | 42.62 | 15 | 12.30 | 3 | 2.46 | 0 | 0.00 | 2 | 1.64 | 32 | 25.23 | 3 | 2.46 | 11 | 9.02 | 4 (Note: Bennet - 1 Castro - 1 Wells - 1 Yang - 1) | 3.28 (Note: Bennet - 0.82 Castro - 0.82 Wells - 0.82 Yang - 0.82) | 122 | 3.42 |
| Clay | 133 | 49.63 | 34 | 12.69 | 14 | 5.22 | 1 | 0.37 | 8 | 2.99 | 43 | 16.04 | 1 | 0.37 | 29 | 10.82 | 5 (Note: Bennet - 1 De La Fuente - 2 Williamson - 2) | 1.87 (Note: Bennet - 0.37 De La Fuente - 0.75 Williamson - 0.75) | 268 | 3.48 |
| Cochran | 17 | 53.12 | 4 | 12.50 | 0 | 0.00 | 0 | 0.00 | 0 | 0.00 | 8 | 25.00 | 0 | 0.00 | 3 | 9.38 | 0 | 0 | 32 | 1.82 |
| Coke | 26 | 36.62 | 14 | 19.72 | 6 | 8.45 | 0 | 0.00 | 3 | 4.23 | 12 | 16.90 | 2 | 2.82 | 5 | 7.05 | 3 (Note: Bennet - 1 Booker - 1 Yang - 1) | 4.23 (Note: Bennet - 1.41 Booker - 1.41 Yang - 1.41) | 71 | 3.09 |
| Coleman | 70 | 42.94 | 16 | 9.82 | 9 | 5.52 | 1 | 0.61 | 12 | 7.36 | 36 | 22.09 | 2 | 1.23 | 15 | 9.20 | 2 (Note: Bennet - 1 Booker - 1) | 1.22 (Note: Bennet - 0.61 Booker - 0.61) | 163 | 2.80 |
| Collin | 29,960 | 35.52 | 11,229 | 13.31 | 4,496 | 5.33 | 264 | 0.31 | 2,122 | 2.52 | 25,548 | 30.29 | 514 | 0.61 | 9,585 | 11.36 | 632 (Note: Bennet - 45 Booker - 74 Castro - 71 De La Fuente - 19 Delaney - 26 Patrick - 18 Wells - 11 Williamson - 31 Yang - 337) | 0.74 (Note: Bennet - 0.05 Booker - 0.09 Castro - 0.08 De La Fuente - 0.02 Delaney - 0.03 Patrick - 0.02 Wells - 0.01 Williamson - 0.04 Yang - 0.40) | 84,350 | 13.97 |
| Collingsworth | 22 | 34.92 | 15 | 23.81 | 1 | 1.59 | 0 | 0.00 | 3 | 4.76 | 11 | 17.46 | 0 | 0.00 | 8 | 12.70 | 3 (Note: Booker - 1 Castro - 2) | 4.76 (Note: Booker - 1.59 Castro - 3.17) | 63 | 3.31 |
| Colorado | 427 | 46.16 | 142 | 15.35 | 36 | 3.89 | 8 | 0.86 | 25 | 2.70 | 167 | 18.05 | 11 | 1.19 | 57 | 6.16 | 52 (Note: Bennet - 9 Booker - 7 Castro - 6 De La Fuente - 5 Delaney - 9 Patrick - 4 Wells - 3 Williamson - 6 Yang - 3) | 5.61 (Note: Bennet - 0.97 Booker - 0.76 Castro - 0.65 De La Fuente - 0.54 Delaney - 0.97 Patrick - 0.43 Wells - 0.32 Williamson - 0.65 Yang - 0.32) | 925 | 6.62 |
| Comal | 3,620 | 36.15 | 1,393 | 13.91 | 683 | 6.82 | 52 | 0.52 | 396 | 3.95 | 2,411 | 24.08 | 60 | 0.60 | 1,296 | 12.94 | 102 (Note: Bennet - 4 Booker - 12 Castro - 31 De La Fuente - 8 Delaney - 17 Patrick - 1 Wells - 2 Williamson - 7 Yang - 20) | 1.02 (Note: Bennet - 0.04 Booker - 0.12 Castro - 0.31 De La Fuente - 0.08 Delaney - 0.17 Patrick - 0.01 Wells - 0.02 Williamson - 0.07 Yang - 0.20) | 10,013 | 9.40 |
| Comanche | 145 | 36.52 | 84 | 21.16 | 12 | 3.02 | 0 | 0.00 | 12 | 3.02 | 102 | 25.69 | 7 | 1.76 | 26 | 6.55 | 9 (Note: Castro - 4 De La Fuente - 1 Delaney - 1 Wells - 1 Williamson - 2) | 2.26 (Note: Castro - 1.01 De La Fuente - 0.25 Delaney - 0.25 Wells - 0.25 Williamson - 0.50) | 397 | 4.27 |
| Concho | 27 | 41.54 | 10 | 15.38 | 2 | 3.08 | 0 | 0.00 | 0 | 0.00 | 19 | 29.23 | 0 | 0.00 | 7 | 10.77 | 0 | 0.00 | 65 | 3.89 |
| Cooke | 498 | 40.79 | 230 | 18.84 | 35 | 2.87 | 3 | 0.25 | 22 | 1.80 | 308 | 25.23 | 16 | 1.31 | 94 | 7.70 | 15 (Note: Bennet - 3 Booker - 2 Castro - 1 Delaney - 3 Williamson - 3 Yang - 3) | 1.24 (Note: Bennet - 0.25 Booker - 0.16 Castro - 0.08 Delaney - 0.25 Williamson - 0.25 Yang - 0.25) | 1,221 | 4.69 |
| Coryell | 977 | 40.11 | 335 | 13.75 | 86 | 3.53 | 12 | 0.49 | 61 | 2.50 | 698 | 28.65 | 7 | 0.29 | 215 | 8.83 | 45 (Note: Bennet - 1 Booker - 12 Castro - 4 De La Fuente - 3 Patrick - 2 Wells - 2 Williamson - 6 Yang - 15) | 1.84 (Note: Bennet - 0.04 Booker - 0.49 Castro - 0.16 De La Fuente - 0.12 Patrick - 0.08 Wells - 0.08 Williamson - 0.25 Yang - 0.62) | 2,436 | 6.24 |
| Cottle | 20 | 32.79 | 8 | 13.11 | 3 | 4.92 | 0 | 0.00 | 0 | 0.00 | 18 | 29.51 | 1 | 1.64 | 6 | 9.84 | 5 (Note: Booker - 2 Castro - 1 De La Fuente - 1 Delaney - 1) | 8.20 (Note: Booker - 3.28 Castro - 1.64 De La Fuente - 1.64 Delaney - 1.64) | 61 | 5.93 |
| Crane | 24 | 32.43 | 12 | 16.22 | 3 | 4.05 | 1 | 1.35 | 0 | 0.00 | 25 | 33.78 | 1 | 1.35 | 4 | 5.41 | 4 (Note: Booker - 1 Castro - 2 De La Fuente - 1) | 5.40 (Note: Booker - 1.35 Castro - 2.70 De La Fuente - 1.35) | 74 | 2.80 |
| Crockett | 84 | 26.84 | 42 | 13.42 | 6 | 1.92 | 14 | 4.47 | 19 | 6.07 | 77 | 24.60 | 6 | 1.28 | 26 | 8.31 | 39 (Note: Bennet - 2 Booker - 1 Castro - 18 De La Fuente - 3 Delaney - 4 Patrick - 1 Wells - 1 Williamson - 5 Yang - 4) | 12.47 (Note: Bennet - 0.64 Booker - 0.32 Castro - 5.75 De La Fuente - 0.96 Delaney - 1.28 Patrick - 0.32 Wells - 0.32 Williamson - 1.60 Yang - 1.28) | 313 | 12.73 |
| Crosby | 83 | 43.23 | 33 | 17.19 | 4 | 2.08 | 1 | 0.52 | 4 | 2.08 | 55 | 28.65 | 0 | 0.00 | 9 | 4.69 | 3 (Note: Castro - 2 Delaney - 1) | 1.56 (Note: Castro - 1.04 Delaney - 0.52) | 192 | 5.45 |
| Culberson | 128 | 21.73 | 137 | 23.26 | 22 | 3.74 | 12 | 2.04 | 7 | 1.19 | 188 | 31.92 | 7 | 1.19 | 21 | 3.57 | 67 (Note: Bennet - 4 Booker - 6 Castro - 10 De La Fuente - 17 Delaney - 6 Patrick - 1 Wells - 7 Williamson - 6 Yang - 10) | 11.39 (Note: Bennet - 0.68 Booker - 1.02 Castro - 1.70 De La Fuente - 2.89 Delaney - 1.02 Patrick - 0.17 Wells - 1.19 Williamson - 1.02 Yang - 1.70) | 589 | 34.98 |
| Dallam | 20 | 29.85 | 9 | 13.43 | 5 | 7.46 | 0 | 0.00 | 0 | 0.00 | 26 | 38.81 | 0 | 0.00 | 3 | 4.48 | 4 (Note: Booker - 1 Castro - 1 De La Fuente - 1 Wells - 1) | 5.96 (Note: Booker - 1.49 Castro - 1.49 De La Fuente - 1.49 Wells - 1.49) | 67 | 2.23 |
| Dallas | 93,426 | 40.32 | 31,419 | 13.56 | 8,944 | 3.86 | 557 | 0.24 | 3,414 | 1.47 | 62,611 | 27.02 | 2,220 | 0.96 | 22,913 | 9.89 | 6,184 (Note: Bennet - 1,821 Booker - 1,281 Castro - 429 De La Fuente - 150 Delaney - 604 Patrick - 46 Wells - 60 Williamson - 1,344 Yang - 449) | 2.67 (Note: Bennet - 0.79 Booker - 0.55 Castro - 0.19 De La Fuente - 0.06 Delaney - 0.26 Patrick - 0.02 Wells - 0.03 Williamson - 0.58 Yang - 0.19) | 231,688 | 17.25 |
| Dawson | 101 | 30.42 | 89 | 26.81 | 13 | 3.92 | 1 | 0.30 | 0 | 0.00 | 71 | 21.39 | 3 | 0.90 | 19 | 5.72 | 34 (Note: Bennet - 1 Booker - 3 Castro - 10 De La Fuente - 5 Delaney - 11 Williamson - 1 Yang - 3) | 10.23 (Note: Bennet - 0.30 Booker - 0.90 Castro - 3.01 De La Fuente - 1.51 Delaney - 3.31 Williamson - 0.30 Yang - 0.90) | 332 | 4.71 |
| Deaf Smith | 133 | 36.44 | 84 | 23.01 | 6 | 1.64 | 1 | 0.27 | 7 | 1.92 | 85 | 23.29 | 3 | 0.82 | 24 | 6.58 | 22 (Note: Bennet - 2 Booker - 1 Castro - 8 De La Fuente - 2 Patrick - 2 Williamson - 2 Yang - 5) | 6.03 (Note: Bennet - 0.55 Booker - 0.27 Castro - 2.19 De La Fuente - 0.55 Patrick - 0.55 Williamson - 0.55 Yang - 1.37) | 365 | 4.14 |
| Delta | 30 | 28.04 | 23 | 21.50 | 6 | 5.61 | 0 | 0.00 | 1 | 0.93 | 33 | 30.84 | 0 | 0.00 | 8 | 7.48 | 6 (Note: Booker - 2 Castro - 1 De La Fuente - 1 Williamson - 2) | 5.60 (Note: Booker - 1.87 Castro - 0.93 De La Fuente - 0.93 Williamson - 1.87) | 107 | 2.78 |
| Denton | 21,936 | 32.70 | 8,126 | 12.11 | 3,621 | 5.40 | 244 | 0.36 | 1,648 | 2.46 | 22,238 | 33.15 | 444 | 0.66 | 8,343 | 12.44 | 492 (Note: Bennet - 62 Booker - 74 Castro - 57 De La Fuente - 19 Delaney - 20 Patrick - 17 Wells - 13 Williamson - 36 Yang - 194) | 0.73 (Note: Bennet - 0.09 Booker - 0.11 Castro - 0.08 De La Fuente - 0.03 Delaney - 0.03 Patrick - 0.03 Wells - 0.02 Williamson - 0.05 Yang - 0.29) | 67,092 | 12.77 |
| DeWitt | 235 | 45.45 | 89 | 17.21 | 15 | 2.90 | 0 | 0.00 | 15 | 2.90 | 108 | 20.89 | 6 | 1.16 | 39 | 7.54 | 10 (Note: Bennet - 2 Castro - 5 De La Fuente - 2 Yang - 1) | 1.94 (Note: Bennet - 0.39 Castro - 0.97 De La Fuente - 0.39 Yang - 0.19) | 517 | 4.41 |
| Dickens | 15 | 26.79 | 18 | 32.14 | 2 | 3.57 | 0 | 0.00 | 2 | 3.57 | 8 | 14.29 | 0 | 0.00 | 10 | 17.86 | 0 | 0.00 | 56 | 4.34 |
| Dimmit | 660 | 16.75 | 907 | 23.01 | 93 | 2.36 | 31 | 0.79 | 47 | 1.19 | 1,159 | 29.41 | 66 | 1.67 | 145 | 3.68 | 833 (Note: Bennet - 146 Booker - 10 Castro - 347 De La Fuente - 198 Delaney - 25 Patrick - 12 Wells - 24 Williamson - 21 Yang - 50) | 21.11 (Note: Bennet - 3.70 Booker - 0.25 Castro - 8.80 De La Fuente - 5.02 Delaney - 0.63 Patrick - 0.30 Wells - 0.61 Williamson - 0.53 Yang - 1.27) | 3,941 | 53.97 |
| Donley | 22 | 33.67 | 12 | 20.00 | 0 | 0.00 | 1 | 1.67 | 4 | 6.67 | 14 | 23.33 | 0 | 0.00 | 5 | 8.33 | 2 (Note: Bennet - 2) | 3.33 (Note: Bennet - 3.33) | 60 | 2.69 |
| Duval | 511 | 22.21 | 505 | 21.95 | 56 | 2.43 | 21 | 0.91 | 41 | 1.78 | 820 | 35.64 | 30 | 1.30 | 109 | 4.74 | 208 (Note: Bennet - 20 Booker - 2 Castro - 54 De La Fuente - 82 Delaney - 14 Patrick - 4 Wells - 8 Williamson - 6 Yang - 18) | 9.04 (Note: Bennet - 0.87 Booker - 0.09 Castro - 2.35 De La Fuente - 3.56 Delaney - 0.61 Patrick - 0.17 Wells - 0.35 Williamson - 0.26 Yang - 0.78) | 2,301 | 28.14 |
| Eastland | 152 | 38.78 | 50 | 12.76 | 13 | 3.32 | 1 | 0.26 | 8 | 2.04 | 124 | 31.63 | 5 | 1.28 | 28 | 7.14 | 11 (Note: Bennet - 1 Castro - 1 De La Fuente - 2 Delaney - 2 Patrick - 1 Wells - 2 Yang - 2) | 2.82 (Note: Bennet - 0.26 Castro - 0.26 De La Fuente - 0.51 Delaney - 0.51 Patrick - 0.26 Wells - 0.51 Yang - 0.51) | 392 | 3.35 |
| Ector | 1,172 | 34.30 | 570 | 16.68 | 102 | 2.99 | 12 | 0.35 | 56 | 1.64 | 1,017 | 29.76 | 23 | 0.67 | 344 | 10.07 | 121 (Note: Bennet - 16 Booker - 8 Castro - 35 De La Fuente - 16 Delaney - 27 Patrick - 1 Wells - 1 Williamson - 5 Yang - 12) | 3.54 (Note: Bennet - 0.47 Booker - 0.23 Castro - 1.02 De La Fuente - 0.47 Delaney - 0.79 Patrick - 0.03 Wells - 0.03 Williamson - 0.15 Yang - 0.35) | 3,417 | 4.40 |
| Edwards | 3 | 8.57 | 4 | 11.43 | 0 | 0.00 | 0 | 0.00 | 2 | 5.71 | 11 | 31.43 | 2 | 5.71 | 9 | 25.71 | 4 (Note: Bennet - 1 Castro - 3) | 11.43 (Note: Bennet - 2.86 Castro - 8.57) | 35 | 2.42 |
| Ellis | 4,456 | 45.93 | 1,393 | 14.36 | 309 | 3.19 | 24 | 0.25 | 162 | 1.67 | 2,382 | 24.55 | 81 | 0.83 | 745 | 7.68 | 149 (Note: Bennet - 10 Booker - 42 Castro - 36 De La Fuente - 9 Delaney - 2 Patrick - 9 Wells - 12 Williamson - 7 Yang - 22) | 1.52 (Note: Bennet - 0.10 Booker - 0.43 Castro - 0.37 De La Fuente - 0.09 Delaney - 0.02 Patrick - 0.09 Wells - 0.12 Williamson - 0.07 Yang - 0.23) | 9,701 | 8.58 |
| El Paso | 19,237 | 28.23 | 13,994 | 20.54 | 2,321 | 3.41 | 368 | 0.54 | 1,125 | 1.65 | 24,738 | 36.31 | 217 | 0.32 | 4,165 | 6.11 | 1,967 (Note: Bennet - 303 Booker - 88 Castro - 589 De La Fuente - 211 Delaney - 259 Patrick - 85 Wells - 77 Williamson - 133 Yang - 222) | 2.88 (Note: Bennet - 0.44 Booker - 0.13 Castro - 0.86 De La Fuente - 0.31 Delaney - 0.38 Patrick - 0.12 Wells - 0.11 Williamson - 0.20 Yang - 0.33) | 68,132 | 14.46 |
| Erath | 375 | 33.81 | 154 | 13.89 | 57 | 5.14 | 1 | 0.09 | 31 | 2.80 | 325 | 29.31 | 11 | 0.99 | 142 | 12.80 | 13 (Note: Bennet - 1 Castro - 6 De La Fuente - 1 Delaney - 2 Wells - 1 Yang - 2) | 1.17 (Note: Bennet - 0.09 Castro - 0.54 De La Fuente - 0.09 Delaney - 0.18 Wells - 0.09 Yang - 0.18) | 1,109 | 4.83 |
| Falls | 349 | 48.14 | 156 | 21.52 | 11 | 1.52 | 3 | 0.41 | 4 | 0.55 | 139 | 19.17 | 3 | 0.41 | 43 | 5.93 | 17 (Note: Bennet - 1 Booker - 3 De La Fuente - 2 Delaney - 8 Williamson - 2 Yang - 1) | 2.35 (Note: Bennet - 0.14 Booker - 0.41 De La Fuente - 0.28 Delaney - 1.10 Williamson - 0.28 Yang - 0.14) | 725 | 7.16 |
| Fannin | 411 | 42.28 | 180 | 18.52 | 52 | 5.35 | 5 | 0.51 | 23 | 2.37 | 188 | 19.34 | 17 | 1.75 | 79 | 8.13 | 17 (Note: Castro - 2 De La Fuente - 3 Delaney - 3 Patrick - 1 Wells - 5 Williamson - 1 Yang - 2) | 1.75 (Note: Castro - 0.21 De La Fuente - 0.31 Delaney - 0.31 Patrick - 0.10 Wells - 0.51 Williamson - 0.10 Yang - 0.21) | 972 | 4.67 |
| Fayette | 529 | 43.01 | 235 | 19.11 | 41 | 3.33 | 6 | 0.49 | 39 | 3.17 | 228 | 18.54 | 13 | 1.06 | 117 | 9.51 | 22 (Note: Bennet - 11 Booker - 1 Castro - 4 De La Fuente - 1 Patrick - 1 Williamson - 2 Yang - 2) | 1.78 (Note: Bennet - 0.89 Booker - 0.08 Castro - 0.33 De La Fuente - 0.08 Patrick - 0.08 Williamson - 0.16 Yang - 0.16) | 1,230 | 7.32 |
| Fisher | 81 | 50.31 | 18 | 11.18 | 6 | 3.73 | 2 | 1.24 | 8 | 4.97 | 29 | 18.01 | 6 | 3.73 | 10 | 6.21 | 1 (Note: Patrick - 1) | 0.62 (Note: Bennet - Patrick - 0.62) | 161 | 6.23 |
| Floyd | 53 | 46.90 | 17 | 15.04 | 5 | 4.42 | 0 | 0.00 | 2 | 1.77 | 22 | 19.47 | 1 | 0.88 | 7 | 6.19 | 6 (Note: Bennet - 3 Castro - 1 De La Fuente - 1 Delaney - 1) | 5.29 (Note: Bennet - 2.65 Castro - 0.88 De La Fuente - 0.88 Delaney - 0.88) | 113 | 2.93 |
| Foard | 15 | 50.00 | 2 | 6.67 | 0 | 0.00 | 0 | 0.00 | 2 | 6.67 | 7 | 23.33 | 0 | 0.00 | 4 | 13.33 | 0 | 0.00 | 30 | 3.46 |
| Fort Bend | 29,189 | 41.97 | 10,459 | 15.04 | 2,227 | 3.20 | 397 | 0.57 | 1,203 | 1.73 | 18,285 | 26.29 | 452 | 0.65 | 6,060 | 8.71 | 1,268 (Note: Bennet - 91 Booker - 489 Castro - 152 De La Fuente - 51 Delaney - 49 Patrick - 36 Wells - 22 Williamson - 44 Yang - 334) | 1.81 (Note: Bennet - 0.13 Booker - 0.70 Castro - 0.22 De La Fuente - 0.07 Delaney - 0.07 Patrick - 0.05 Wells - 0.03 Williamson - 0.06 Yang - 0.48) | 69,540 | 15.25 |
| Franklin | 187 | 50.54 | 69 | 18.65 | 17 | 4.59 | 1 | 0.27 | 10 | 2.70 | 57 | 15.41 | 0 | 0.00 | 22 | 5.95 | 7 (Note: Bennet - 3 Patrick - 1 Wells - 1 Williamson - 2) | 1.89 (Note: Bennet - 0.81 Patrick - 0.27 Wells - 0.27 Williamson - 0.54) | 370 | 5.45 |
| Freestone | 329 | 48.10 | 106 | 15.50 | 10 | 1.46 | 1 | 0.15 | 11 | 1.61 | 167 | 24.42 | 8 | 1.17 | 38 | 5.56 | 14 (Note: Bennet - 3 Booker - 1 Castro - 2 De La Fuente - 1 Delaney - 1 Wells - 2 Williamson - 1 Yang - 3) | 2.06 (Note: Bennet - 0.44 Booker - 0.15 Castro - 0.29 De La Fuente - 0.15 Delaney - 0.15 Wells - 0.29 Williamson - 0.15 Yang - 0.44) | 684 | 5.68 |
| Frio | 515 | 20.32 | 540 | 21.30 | 44 | 1.74 | 33 | 1.30 | 74 | 2.92 | 695 | 27.42 | 57 | 2.25 | 153 | 6.04 | 424 (Note: Bennet - 13 Booker - 19 Castro - 265 De La Fuente - 44 Delaney - 19 Patrick - 9 Wells - 19 Williamson - 9 Yang - 27) | 16.74 (Note: Bennet - 0.51 Booker - 0.75 Castro - 10.45 De La Fuente - 1.74 Delaney - 0.75 Patrick - 0.36 Wells - 0.75 Williamson - 0.36 Yang - 1.07) | 2,535 | 29.18 |
| Gaines | 71 | 39.44 | 31 | 17.22 | 2 | 1.11 | 1 | 0.56 | 1 | 0.56 | 46 | 25.56 | 0 | 0.00 | 14 | 7.78 | 14 (Note: Bennet - 1 Booker - 1 Castro - 4 De La Fuente - 5 Williamson - 2 Yang - 1) | 7.79 (Note: Bennet - 0.56 Booker - 0.56 Castro - 2.22 De La Fuente - 2.78 Williamson - 1.11 Yang - 0.56) | 180 | 1.95 |
| Galveston | 9,120 | 41.37 | 2,911 | 13.21 | 1,022 | 4.64 | 77 | 0.35 | 537 | 2.44 | 5,418 | 24.58 | 185 | 0.84 | 2,425 | 11.00 | 349 (Note: Bennet - 114 Booker - 31 Castro - 101 De La Fuente - 5 Delaney - 10 Patrick - 12 Wells - 8 Williamson - 18 Yang - 50) | 1.59 (Note: Bennet - 0.52 Booker - 0.14 Castro - 0.46 De La Fuente - 0.02 Delaney - 0.05 Patrick - 0.05 Wells - 0.04 Williamson - 0.08 Yang - 0.23) | 22,044 | 10.11 |
| Garza | 40 | 42.11 | 20 | 21.05 | 4 | 4.21 | 0 | 0.00 | 2 | 2.11 | 21 | 22.11 | 0 | 0.00 | 8 | 8.42 | 0 | 0.00 | 95 | 3.66 |
| Gillespie | 616 | 40.90 | 258 | 17.13 | 79 | 5.25 | 4 | 0.27 | 88 | 5.84 | 265 | 17.60 | 14 | 0.93 | 170 | 11.29 | 12 (Note: Bennet - 4 Castro - 1 De La Fuente - 1 Patrick - 1 Wells - 1 Williamson - 2 Yang - 2) | 0.81 (Note: Bennet - 0.27 Castro - 0.07 De La Fuente - 0.07 Patrick - 0.07 Wells - 0.07 Williamson - 0.13 Yang - 0.13) | 1,506 | 7.71 |
| Glasscock | 3 | 23.08 | 4 | 30.77 | 0 | 0.00 | 0 | 0.00 | 0 | 0.00 | 6 | 46.15 | 0 | 0.00 | 0 | 0.00 | 0 | 0.00 | 13 | 1.64 |
| Goliad | 187 | 49.21 | 66 | 17.37 | 14 | 3.68 | 1 | 0.26 | 6 | 1.58 | 633 | 16.58 | 3 | 0.79 | 26 | 6.84 | 14 (Note: Bennet - 3 Castro - 7 De La Fuente - 1 Wells - 2 Williamson - 1) | 3.68 (Note: Bennet - 0.79 Castro - 1.84 De La Fuente - 0.26 Wells - 0.53 Williamson - 0.26) | 380 | 6.83 |
| Gonzales | 239 | 38.00 | 135 | 21.46 | 26 | 4.13 | 3 | 0.48 | 8 | 1.27 | 129 | 20.51 | 9 | 1.43 | 40 | 6.36 | 40 (Note: Bennet - 3 Booker - 2 Castro - 14 De La Fuente - 1 Delaney - 2 Patrick - 4 Wells - 2 Williamson - 9 Yang - 3) | 6.38 (Note: Bennet - 0.48 Booker - 0.32 Castro - 2.23 De La Fuente - 0.16 Delaney - 0.32 Patrick - 0.64 Wells - 0.32 Williamson - 1.43 Yang - 0.48) | 629 | 5.12 |
| Gray | 117 | 42.55 | 38 | 13.82 | 7 | 2.55 | 1 | 0.36 | 8 | 2.91 | 79 | 28.73 | 1 | 0.36 | 20 | 7.27 | 4 (Note: Booker - 1 Castro - 1 De La Fuente - 1 Williamson - 1) | 1.44 (Note: Booker - 0.36 Castro - 0.36 De La Fuente - 0.36 Williamson - 0.36) | 275 | 2.26 |
| Grayson | 2,365 | 40.00 | 1,015 | 17.17 | 237 | 4.01 | 20 | 0.34 | 141 | 2.38 | 1,542 | 26.08 | 28 | 0.47 | 510 | 8.63 | 54 (Note: Bennet - 5 Booker - 9 Castro - 6 De La Fuente - 3 Delaney - 5 Patrick - 3 Wells - 4 Williamson - 5 Yang - 14) | 0.90 (Note: Bennet - 0.08 Booker - 0.15 Castro - 0.10 De La Fuente - 0.05 Delaney - 0.08 Patrick - 0.05 Wells - 0.07 Williamson - 0.08 Yang - 0.24) | 5,912 | 7.18 |
| Gregg | 2,856 | 52.12 | 785 | 14.32 | 161 | 2.94 | 23 | 0.42 | 98 | 1.79 | 1,089 | 19.87 | 24 | 0.44 | 343 | 6.26 | 101 (Note: Bennet - 27 Booker - 18 Castro - 12 De La Fuente - 5 Delaney - 5 Patrick - 1 Wells - 9 Williamson - 13 Yang - 11) | 1.84 (Note: Bennet - 0.49 Booker - 0.33 Castro - 0.22 De La Fuente - 0.09 Delaney - 0.09 Patrick - 0.02 Wells - 0.16 Williamson - 0.24 Yang - 0.20) | 5,480 | 7.80 |
| Grimes | 503 | 45.36 | 177 | 15.96 | 22 | 1.98 | 2 | 0.18 | 11 | 0.99 | 246 | 22.18 | 16 | 1.44 | 90 | 8.12 | 42 (Note: Bennet - 2 Booker - 4 Castro - 3 De La Fuente - 6 Delaney - 1 Patrick - 10 Wells - 5 Williamson - 2 Yang - 9) | 3.78 (Note: Bennet - 0.18 Booker - 0.36 Castro - 0.27 De La Fuente - 0.54 Delaney - 0.09 Patrick - 0.90 Wells - 0.45 Williamson - 0.18 Yang - 0.81) | 1,109 | 6.62 |
| Guadalupe | 3,799 | 37.88 | 1,397 | 13.93 | 400 | 3.99 | 37 | 0.37 | 247 | 2.46 | 2,833 | 28.25 | 87 | 0.87 | 1,085 | 10.82 | 145 (Note: Bennet - 15 Booker - 8 Castro - 65 De La Fuente - 3 Delaney - 7 Patrick - 1 Wells - 12 Williamson - 9 Yang - 25) | 1.45 (Note: Bennet - 0.15 Booker - 0.08 Castro - 0.65 De La Fuente - 0.03 Delaney - 0.07 Patrick - 0.01 Wells - 0.12 Williamson - 0.09 Yang - 0.25) | 10,030 | 9.60 |
| Hale | 242 | 37.52 | 111 | 17.21 | 25 | 3.88 | 3 | 0.47 | 18 | 2.79 | 169 | 26.20 | 3 | 0.47 | 47 | 7.29 | 27 (Note: Bennet - 7 Booker - 2 Castro - 10 De La Fuente - 2 Williamson - 3 Yang - 3) | 4.20 (Note: Bennet - 1.09 Booker - 0.31 Castro - 1.55 De La Fuente - 0.31 Williamson - 0.47 Yang - 0.47) | 645 | 3.43 |
| Hall | 41 | 48.81 | 20 | 23.81 | 1 | 1.19 | 1 | 1.19 | 0 | 0.00 | 18 | 21.43 | 1 | 1.19 | 0 | 0.00 | 2 (Note: Castro - 1 Williamson - 1) | 2.38 (Note: Castro - 1.19 Williamson - 1.19) | 84 | 4.33 |
| Hamilton | 118 | 49.17 | 41 | 17.08 | 6 | 2.50 | 0 | 0.00 | 9 | 3.75 | 42 | 17.50 | 1 | 0.42 | 23 | 9.58 | 0 | 0.00 | 240 | 4.23 |
| Hansford | 8 | 34.78 | 0 | 0.00 | 0 | 0.00 | 0 | 0.00 | 0 | 0.00 | 12 | 52.17 | 0 | 0.00 | 0 | 0.00 | 3 (Note: Bennet - 1 Castro - 2) | 13.05 (Note: Bennet - 4.35 Castro - 8.70) | 23 | 0.77 |
| Hardeman | 688 | 48.83 | 222 | 15.76 | 48 | 3.41 | 4 | 0.28 | 28 | 1.99 | 282 | 20.01 | 3 | 0.21 | 88 | 6.25 | 37 (Note: Bennet - 4 Booker - 2 De La Fuente - 1 Delaney - 19 Wells - 2 Williamson - 2 Yang - 7) | 2.62 (Note: Bennet - 0.28 Booker - 0.14 De La Fuente - 0.07 Delaney - 1.35 Wells - 0.14 Williamson - 0.14 Yang - 0.50) | 1,409 | 3.66 |
| Hardin | 688 | 48.83 | 222 | 15.76 | 48 | 3.41 | 4 | 0.28 | 28 | 1.99 | 282 | 20.01 | 3 | 0.21 | 88 | 6.25 | 46 (Note: Bennet - 4 Booker - 2 Castro - 9 De La Fuente - 1 Delaney - 19 Wells - 2 Williamson - 2 Yang - 7) | 3.26 (Note: Bennet - 0.28 Booker - 0.14 Castro - 0.64 De La Fuente - 0.07 Delaney - 1.35 Wells - 0.14 Williamson - 0.14 Yang - 0.50) | 1,409 | 3.66 |
| Harris | 121,211 | 37.65 | 47,200 | 14.66 | 10,458 | 3.25 | 997 | 0.31 | 6,054 | 1.88 | 91,900 | 28.55 | 2,057 | 0.64 | 35,761 | 11.11 | 6,265 (Note: Bennet - 2,629 Booker - 591 Castro - 695 De La Fuente - 276 Delaney - 379 Patrick - 309 Wells - 130 Williamson - 341 Yang - 915) | 1.96 (Note: Bennet - 0.82 Booker - 0.18 Castro - 0.22 De La Fuente - 0.09 Delaney - 0.12 Patrick - 0.10 Wells - 0.04 Williamson - 0.11 Yang - 0.28) | 321,903 | 13.49 |
| Harrison | 1,657 | 49.91 | 608 | 18.31 | 80 | 2.41 | 13 | 0.39 | 74 | 2.23 | 615 | 18.52 | 16 | 0.48 | 202 | 6.08 | 56 (Note: Bennet - 8 Booker - 14 Castro - 4 De La Fuente - 6 Delaney - 7 Patrick - 3 Wells - 3 Williamson - 9 Yang - 2) | 1.65 (Note: Bennet - 0.21 Booker - 0.42 Castro - 0.12 De La Fuente - 0.18 Delaney - 0.21 Patrick - 0.09 Wells - 0.09 Williamson - 0.27 Yang - 0.06) | 3,320 | 7.43 |
| Hartley | 36 | 52.94 | 12 | 17.65 | 1 | 1.47 | 0 | 0.00 | 0 | 0.00 | 11 | 16.18 | 0 | 0.00 | 7 | 10.29 | 1 (Note: Castro - 1) | 1.47 (Note: Castro - 1.47) | 68 | 2.43 |
| Haskell | 104 | 59.77 | 15 | 8.62 | 3 | 1.72 | 0 | 0.00 | 8 | 4.60 | 20 | 11.49 | 5 | 2.87 | 12 | 6.90 | 7 (Note: Bennet - 1 Booker - 1 Castro - 5) | 4.01 (Note: Bennet - 0.57 Booker - 0.57 Castro - 2.87) | 174 | 5.33 |
| Hays | 7,028 | 27.85 | 2,119 | 8.40 | 1,228 | 4.87 | 111 | 0.44 | 724 | 2.87 | 9,772 | 38.72 | 199 | 0.79 | 3,852 | 15.26 | 203 (Note: Bennet - 12 Booker - 11 Castro - 102 De La Fuente - 8 Delaney - 3 Patrick - 4 Wells - 8 Williamson - 9 Yang - 46) | 0.80 (Note: Bennet - 0.05 Booker - 0.04 Castro - 0.40 De La Fuente - 0.03 Delaney - 0.01 Patrick - 0.02 Wells - 0.03 Williamson - 0.04 Yang - 0.18) | 25,236 | 17.75 |
| Hemphill | 39 | 52.70 | 14 | 18.92 | 3 | 4.05 | 2 | 2.70 | 2 | 2.70 | 8 | 10.81 | 0 | 0.00 | 6 | 8.11 | 0 | 0.00 | 74 | 3.21 |
| Henderson | 1,378 | 45.90 | 529 | 17.62 | 126 | 4.20 | 15 | 0.50 | 64 | 2.13 | 589 | 19.62 | 41 | 1.37 | 221 | 7.36 | 39 (Note: Bennet - 10 Booker - 3 Castro - 1 De La Fuente - 4 Delaney - 8 Patrick - 2 Wells - 1 Williamson - 8 Yang - 2) | 1.30 (Note: Bennet - 0.33 Booker - 0.10 Castro - 0.03 De La Fuente - 0.13 Delaney - 0.27 Patrick - 0.07 Wells - 0.03 Williamson - 0.27 Yang - 0.07) | 3,002 | 5.71 |
| Hidalgo | 15,744 | 26.47 | 15,682 | 26.36 | 1,734 | 2.91 | 719 | 1.21 | 595 | 1.00 | 16,560 | 27.84 | 163 | 0.27 | 3,840 | 6.46 | 4,449 (Note: Bennet - 765 Booker - 246 Castro - 2,387 De La Fuente - 421 Delaney - 59 Patrick - 76 Wells - 70 Williamson - 120 Yang - 305) | 7.48 (Note: Bennet - 1.29 Booker - 0.41 Castro - 4.01 De La Fuente - 0.71 Delaney - 0.10 Patrick - 0.13 Wells - 0.12 Williamson - 0.20 Yang - 0.51) | 59,486 | 15.69 |
| Hill | 559 | 43.77 | 248 | 19.42 | 53 | 4.15 | 3 | 0.23 | 22 | 1.72 | 284 | 22.24 | 10 | 0.78 | 88 | 6.89 | 10 (Note: Bennet - 3 Castro - 2 Delaney - 3 Yang - 2) | 0.78 (Note: Bennet - 0.23 Castro - 0.16 Delaney - 0.23 Yang - 0.16) | 1,277 | 5.63 |
| Hockley | 160 | 40.92 | 72 | 18.41 | 8 | 2.05 | 2 | 0.51 | 5 | 1.28 | 110 | 28.13 | 1 | 0.26 | 30 | 7.67 | 3 (Note: Castro - 1 Delaney - 1 Yang - 1) | 0.78 (Note: Castro - 0.26 Delaney - 0.26 Yang - 0.26) | 391 | 2.90 |
| Hood | 943 | 39.44 | 453 | 18.95 | 134 | 5.60 | 7 | 0.29 | 85 | 3.55 | 508 | 21.25 | 26 | 1.09 | 214 | 8.95 | 22 (Note: Bennet - 8 Booker - 1 Castro - 4 De La Fuente - 1 Delaney - 1 Wells - 1 Williamson - 4 Yang - 2) | 0.87 (Note: Bennet - 0.33 Booker - 0.04 Castro - 0.17 De La Fuente - 0.04 Delaney - 0.04 Wells - 0.04 Williamson - 0.13 Yang - 0.08) | 2,391 | 5.66 |
| Hopkins | 563 | 46.03 | 204 | 16.68 | 30 | 2.45 | 4 | 0.33 | 22 | 1.80 | 271 | 22.16 | 16 | 1.31 | 93 | 7.60 | 20 (Note: Bennet - 1 Booker - 4 Castro - 2 De La Fuente - 1 Delaney - 1 Patrick - 4 Wells - 2 Williamson - 3 Yang - 2) | 1.63 (Note: Bennet - 0.08 Booker - 0.33 Castro - 0.16 De La Fuente - 0.08 Delaney - 0.08 Patrick - 0.33 Wells - 0.16 Williamson - 0.25 Yang - 0.16) | 1,223 | 5.25 |
| Houston | 496 | 55.30 | 132 | 14.72 | 16 | 1.78 | 3 | 0.33 | 19 | 2.12 | 157 | 17.50 | 5 | 0.56 | 45 | 5.02 | 24 (Note: Bennet - 13 Booker - 5 Castro - 2 De La Fuente - 1 Delaney - 1 Patrick - 1 Williamson - 1) | 2.67 (Note: Bennet - 1.45 Booker - 0.56 Castro - 0.22 De La Fuente - 0.11 Delaney - 0.11 Patrick - 0.11 Williamson - 0.11) | 897 | 6.80 |
| Howard | 299 | 38.28 | 173 | 22.15 | 36 | 4.61 | 3 | 0.38 | 13 | 1.66 | 166 | 21.25 | 4 | 0.51 | 71 | 9.09 | 16 (Note: Castro - 4 De La Fuente - 6 Delaney - 1 Williamson - 1 Yang - 4) | 2.05 (Note: Castro - 0.51 De La Fuente - 0.77 Delaney - 0.13 Williamson - 0.13 Yang - 0.51) | 781 | 4.60 |
| Hudspeth | 89 | 25.07 | 52 | 14.65 | 12 | 3.38 | 16 | 4.51 | 7 | 1.97 | 103 | 29.01 | 3 | 0.85 | 12 | 3.38 | 61 (Note: Bennet - 8 Booker - 3 Castro - 11 De La Fuente - 17 Delaney - 2 Patrick - 2 Wells - 6 Williamson - 3 Yang - 9) | 17.19 (Note: Bennet - 2.25 Booker - 0.85 Castro - 3.10 De La Fuente - 4.79 Delaney - 0.56 Patrick - 0.56 Wells - 1.69 Williamson - 0.85 Yang - 2.54) | 355 | 17.66 |
| Hunt | 1,287 | 39.32 | 468 | 14.30 | 91 | 2.78 | 9 | 0.27 | 65 | 1.99 | 1,019 | 31.13 | 27 | 0.82 | 266 | 8.13 | 41 (Note: Bennet - 6 Booker - 6 Castro - 9 De La Fuente - 2 Delaney - 6 Patrick - 1 Williamson - 4 Yang - 7) | 1.23 (Note: Bennet - 0.18 Booker - 0.18 Castro - 0.27 De La Fuente - 0.06 Delaney - 0.18 Patrick - 0.03 Williamson - 0.12 Yang - 0.21) | 3,273 | 5.82 |
| Hutchinson | 130 | 36.72 | 75 | 21.19 | 16 | 4.52 | 1 | 0.28 | 2 | 0.56 | 89 | 25.14 | 4 | 1.13 | 30 | 8.47 | 7 (Note: Booker - 2 Castro - 1 Delaney - 1 Wells - 1 Yang - 2) | 1.96 (Note: Booker - 0.56 Castro - 0.28 Delaney - 0.28 Wells - 0.28 Yang - 0.56) | 354 | 2.65 |
| Irion | 22 | 39.29 | 6 | 10.71 | 2 | 3.57 | 0 | 0.00 | 1 | 1.79 | 16 | 28.57 | 0 | 0.00 | 5 | 8.93 | 4 (Note: Bennet - 2 Wells - 1 Williamson - 1) | 7.15 (Note: Bennet - 3.57 Wells - 1.79 Williamson - 1.79) | 56 | 4.40 |
| Jack | 80 | 45.45 | 35 | 19.89 | 4 | 2.27 | 1 | 0.57 | 6 | 3.41 | 33 | 18.75 | 3 | 1.70 | 11 | 6.25 | 3 (Note: Bennet - 2 Williamson - 1) | 1.71 (Note: Bennet - 1.14 Williamson - 0.57) | 176 | 3.44 |
| Jackson | 192 | 52.03 | 55 | 14.91 | 7 | 1.90 | 4 | 1.08 | 9 | 2.44 | 60 | 16.26 | 5 | 1.36 | 23 | 6.23 | 14 (Note: Bennet - 4 Booker - 1 Castro - 3 Delaney - 1 Williamson - 2 Yang - 3) | 3.78 (Note: Bennet - 1.08 Booker - 0.27 Castro - 0.81 Delaney - 0.27 Williamson - 0.54 Yang - 0.81) | 369 | 4.00 |
| Jasper | 669 | 51.23 | 262 | 20.06 | 31 | 2.37 | 3 | 0.23 | 21 | 1.61 | 220 | 16.85 | 6 | 0.46 | 61 | 4.67 | 33 (Note: Bennet - 15 Booker - 7 De La Fuente - 1 Delaney - 1 Patrick - 2 Wells - 2 Williamson - 1 Yang - 4) | 2.54 (Note: Bennet - 1.15 Booker - 0.54 De La Fuente - 0.08 Delaney - 0.08 Patrick - 0.15 Wells - 0.15 Williamson - 0.08 Yang - 0.31) | 1,306 | 5.76 |
| Jeff Davis | 119 | 36.06 | 35 | 10.61 | 15 | 4.55 | 3 | 0.91 | 12 | 3.64 | 81 | 24.55 | 0 | 0.00 | 58 | 17.58 | 7 (Note: Castro - 2 De La Fuente - 1 Delaney - 1 Wells - 3) | 2.12 (Note: Castro - 0.61 De La Fuente - 0.30 Delaney - 0.30 Wells - 0.91) | 330 | 20.31 |
| Jefferson | 9,815 | 48.47 | 3,800 | 18.77 | 473 | 2.34 | 55 | 0.27 | 249 | 1.23 | 3,981 | 19.66 | 101 | 0.50 | 1,080 | 5.33 | 694 (Note: Bennet - 241 Booker - 155 Castro - 46 De La Fuente - 39 Delaney - 28 Patrick - 16 Wells - 28 Williamson - 45 Yang - 96) | 3.43 (Note: Bennet - 1.19 Booker - 0.77 Castro - 0.23 De La Fuente - 0.19 Delaney - 0.14 Patrick - 0.08 Wells - 0.14 Williamson - 0.22 Yang - 0.47) | 20,248 | 13.76 |
| Jim Hogg | 288 | 23.40 | 299 | 24.29 | 37 | 3.01 | 15 | 1.22 | 24 | 1.95 | 343 | 27.86 | 14 | 1.14 | 60 | 4.87 | 151 (Note: Bennet - 44 Booker - 3 Castro - 42 De La Fuente - 46 Delaney - 3 Wells - 4 Williamson - 1 Yang - 8) | 12.25 (Note: Bennet - 3.57 Booker - 0.24 Castro - 3.41 De La Fuente - 3.74 Delaney - 0.24 Wells - 0.32 Williamson - 0.08 Yang - 0.65) | 1,231 | 32.26 |
| Jim Wells | 1,619 | 34.40 | 1,021 | 21.70 | 141 | 3.00 | 43 | 0.91 | 82 | 1.74 | 1,044 | 22.18 | 48 | 1.02 | 267 | 5.67 | 441 (Note: Bennet - 46 Booker - 7 Castro - 146 De La Fuente - 118 Delaney - 16 Patrick - 3 Wells - 42 Williamson - 30 Yang - 33) | 9.37 (Note: Bennet - 0.98 Booker - 0.15 Castro - 3.10 De La Fuente - 2.51 Delaney - 0.34 Patrick - 0.06 Wells - 0.89 Williamson - 0.64 Yang - 0.70) | 4,706 | 17.88 |
| Johnson | 2,326 | 37.50 | 943 | 15.20 | 277 | 4.47 | 31 | 0.50 | 125 | 2.02 | 1,790 | 28.86 | 87 | 1.40 | 576 | 9.29 | 48 (Note: Bennet - 7 Booker - 7 Castro - 9 De La Fuente - 4 Delaney - 4 Patrick - 2 Williamson - 1 Yang - 14) | 0.77 (Note: Bennet - 0.11 Booker - 0.11 Castro - 0.15 De La Fuente - 0.06 Delaney - 0.06 Patrick - 0.03 Williamson - 0.02 Yang - 0.23) | 6,203 | 6.18 |
| Jones | 160 | 46.92 | 43 | 12.61 | 10 | 2.93 | 1 | 0.29 | 8 | 2.35 | 83 | 24.34 | 1 | 0.29 | 29 | 8.50 | 6 (Note: Bennet - 1 Castro - 1 Delaney - 2 Williamson - 1 Yang - 1) | 1.75 (Note: Bennet - 0.29 Castro - 0.29 Delaney - 0.59 Williamson - 0.29 Yang - 0.29) | 341 | 3.67 |
| Karnes | 210 | 33.87 | 129 | 20.81 | 12 | 1.94 | 6 | 0.97 | 12 | 1.94 | 147 | 23.71 | 12 | 1.94 | 31 | 5.00 | 61 (Note: Bennet - 3 Booker - 4 Castro - 31 De La Fuente - 7 Delaney - 4 Wells - 2 Williamson - 1 Yang - 9) | 9.84 (Note: Bennet - 0.48 Booker - 0.65 Castro - 5.00 De La Fuente - 1.13 Delaney - 0.65 Wells - 0.32 Williamson - 0.16 Yang - 1.45) | 620 | 7.60 |
| Kaufman | 2,351 | 42.39 | 819 | 14.77 | 182 | 3.28 | 19 | 0.34 | 74 | 1.33 | 1,485 | 26.78 | 57 | 1.03 | 432 | 7.79 | 127 (Note: Bennet - 53 Booker - 7 Castro - 6 De La Fuente - 13 Delaney - 3 Patrick - 4 Wells - 3 Williamson - 30 Yang - 8) | 2.28 (Note: Bennet - 0.96 Booker - 0.13 Castro - 0.11 De La Fuente - 0.23 Delaney - 0.05 Patrick - 0.07 Wells - 0.05 Williamson - 0.54 Yang - 0.14) | 5,546 | 7.28 |
| Kendall | 924 | 35.79 | 432 | 16.73 | 169 | 6.55 | 15 | 0.58 | 123 | 4.76 | 554 | 21.46 | 20 | 0.77 | 309 | 11.97 | 36 (Note: Bennet - 4 Castro - 17 De La Fuente - 1 Patrick - 1 Wells - 1 Williamson - 3 Yang - 9) | 1.40 (Note: Bennet - 0.15 Castro - 0.66 De La Fuente - 0.04 Patrick - 0.04 Wells - 0.04 Williamson - 0.12 Yang - 0.35) | 2,582 | 8.11 |
| Kenedy | 30 | 24.79 | 23 | 19.01 | 5 | 4.13 | 1 | 0.83 | 4 | 3.31 | 22 | 18.18 | 1 | 0.83 | 7 | 5.79 | 28 (Note: Bennet - 6 Castro - 6 De La Fuente - 6 Delaney - 6 Williamson - 3 Yang - 1) | 23.15 (Note: Bennet - 4.96 Castro - 4.96 De La Fuente - 4.96 Delaney - 4.96 Williamson - 2.48 Yang - 0.83) | 121 | 40.60 |
| Kent | 14 | 33.33 | 14 | 33.33 | 2 | 4.76 | 0 | 0.00 | 6 | 14.29 | 4 | 9.52 | 0 | 0.00 | 2 | 4.76 | 0 | 0.00 | 42 | 7.12 |
| Kerr | 1,054 | 37.55 | 453 | 16.14 | 136 | 4.85 | 17 | 0.61 | 107 | 3.81 | 628 | 22.37 | 33 | 1.18 | 349 | 12.43 | 30 (Note: Bennet - 1 Booker - 2 Castro - 15 De La Fuente - 2 Williamson - 3 Yang - 7) | 1.07 (Note: Bennet - 0.04 Booker - 0.07 Castro - 0.53 De La Fuente - 0.07 Williamson - 0.11 Yang - 0.25) | 2,807 | 7.73 |
| Kimble | 41 | 40.20 | 14 | 13.73 | 5 | 4.90 | 0 | 0.00 | 3 | 2.94 | 27 | 26.47 | 0 | 0.00 | 10 | 9.80 | 2 (Note: Castro - 1 De La Fuente - 1) | 1.96 (Note: Castro - 0.98 De La Fuente - 0.98) | 102 | 3.40 |
| King | 0 | 0.00 | 1 | 50.00 | 0 | 0.00 | 0 | 0.00 | 0 | 0.00 | 1 | 50.00 | 0 | 0.00 | 0 | 0.00 | 0 | 0.00 | 2 | 1.14 |
| Kinney | 58 | 40.00 | 29 | 20.00 | 4 | 2.76 | 0 | 0.00 | 4 | 2.76 | 23 | 15.86 | 1 | 0.69 | 13 | 8.97 | 13 (Note: Castro - 3 De La Fuente - 3 Wells - 2 Williamson - 1 Yang - 4) | 8.97 (Note: Castro - 2.07 De La Fuente - 2.07 Wells - 1.38 Williamson - 0.69 Yang - 2.76) | 145 | 6.56 |
| Kleberg | 950 | 38.24 | 454 | 18.28 | 84 | 3.38 | 17 | 0.68 | 36 | 1.45 | 629 | 25.32 | 8 | 0.32 | 167 | 6.72 | 139 (Note: Bennet - 26 Booker - 4 Castro - 61 De La Fuente - 26 Delaney - 1 Patrick - 1 Wells - 2 Williamson - 6 Yang - 12) | 5.60 (Note: Bennet - 1.05 Booker - 0.16 Castro - 2.46 De La Fuente - 1.05 Delaney - 0.04 Patrick - 0.04 Wells - 0.08 Williamson - 0.24 Yang - 0.48) | 2,484 | 13.70 |
| Knox | 53 | 63.86 | 6 | 7.23 | 3 | 3.61 | 0 | 0.00 | 0 | 0.00 | 14 | 16.87 | 0 | 0.00 | 7 | 8.43 | 0 | 0.00 | 83 | 3.49 |
| Lamar | 864 | 46.80 | 303 | 16.41 | 72 | 3.90 | 9 | 0.49 | 31 | 1.68 | 389 | 21.07 | 18 | 0.98 | 137 | 7.42 | 23 (Note: Bennet - 1 Booker - 3 Castro - 1 De La Fuente - 3 Delaney - 2 Patrick - 2 Wells - 2 Williamson - 4 Yang - 5) | 1.24 (Note: Bennet - 0.05 Booker - 0.16 Castro - 0.05 De La Fuente - 0.16 Delaney - 0.11 Patrick - 0.11 Wells - 0.11 Williamson - 0.22 Yang - 0.27) | 1,846 | 5.86 |
| Lamb | 117 | 39.80 | 71 | 24.15 | 7 | 2.38 | 1 | 0.34 | 4 | 1.36 | 75 | 25.51 | 1 | 0.34 | 13 | 4.42 | 5 (Note: Bennet - 1 De La Fuente - 2 Yang - 2) | 1.70 (Note: Bennet - 0.34 De La Fuente - 0.68 Yang - 0.68) | 294 | 3.70 |
| Lampasas | 359 | 40.61 | 130 | 14.71 | 36 | 4.07 | 4 | 0.45 | 34 | 3.85 | 182 | 20.59 | 5 | 0.57 | 115 | 13.01 | 19 (Note: Booker - 5 De La Fuente - 4 Patrick - 2 Williamson - 3 Yang - 5) | 2.16 (Note: Booker - 0.57 De La Fuente - 0.45 Patrick - 0.23 Williamson - 0.34 Yang - 0.57) | 884 | 6.06 |
| La Salle | 262 | 21.34 | 248 | 20.20 | 20 | 1.63 | 35 | 2.85 | 13 | 1.06 | 291 | 23.70 | 18 | 1.47 | 91 | 7.41 | 250 (Note: Bennet - 14 Booker - 13 Castro - 143 De La Fuente - 41 Delaney - 3 Patrick - 3 Wells - 11 Williamson - 13 Yang - 9) | 20.35 (Note: Bennet - 1.14 Booker - 1.06 Castro - 11.64 De La Fuente - 3.34 Delaney - 0.24 Patrick - 0.24 Wells - 0.90 Williamson - 1.06 Yang - 0.73) | 1,228 | 28.12 |
| Lavaca | 234 | 41.86 | 97 | 17.35 | 26 | 4.65 | 4 | 0.72 | 16 | 2.86 | 103 | 18.43 | 8 | 1.43 | 55 | 9.84 | 16 (Note: Bennet - 5 Booker - 3 Castro - 3 Delaney - 3 Wells - 1 Williamson - 1) | 2.87 (Note: Bennet - 0.89 Booker - 0.54 Castro - 0.54 Delaney - 0.54 Wells - 0.18 Williamson - 0.18) | 559 | 4.19 |
| Lee | 338 | 47.74 | 114 | 16.10 | 20 | 2.82 | 0 | 0.00 | 13 | 1.84 | 153 | 21.61 | 6 | 0.85 | 55 | 7.77 | 9 (Note: Bennet - 1 Booker - 1 De La Fuente - 1 Delaney - 2 Wells - 2 Yang - 2) | 1.26 (Note: Bennet - 0.14 Booker - 0.14 De La Fuente - 0.14 Delaney - 0.28 Wells - 0.28 Yang - 0.28) | 708 | 6.61 |
| Leon | 247 | 55.88 | 69 | 15.61 | 16 | 3.62 | 0 | 0.00 | 9 | 2.04 | 67 | 15.16 | 2 | 0.45 | 24 | 5.43 | 8 (Note: De La Fuente - 2 Delaney - 2 Wells - 1 Williamson - 2 Yang - 1) | 1.81 (Note: De La Fuente - 0.45 Delaney - 0.45 Wells - 0.23 Williamson - 0.45 Yang - 0.23) | 442 | 3.89 |
| Liberty | 804 | 43.70 | 325 | 17.66 | 44 | 2.39 | 3 | 0.16 | 24 | 1.30 | 471 | 25.60 | 28 | 1.52 | 121 | 6.58 | 20 (Note: Bennet - 3 Booker - 2 Castro - 2 De La Fuente - 4 Delaney - 2 Williamson - 4 Yang - 3) | 1.09 (Note: Bennet - 0.16 Booker - 0.11 Castro - 0.11 De La Fuente - 0.22 Delaney - 0.11 Williamson - 0.22 Yang - 0.16) | 1,840 | 4.09 |
| Limestone | 354 | 45.74 | 153 | 19.77 | 24 | 3.10 | 1 | 0.13 | 19 | 2.45 | 163 | 21.06 | 4 | 0.52 | 41 | 5.30 | 15 (Note: Bennet - 6 Booker - 1 Castro - 1 De La Fuente - 1 Delaney - 2 Patrick - 2 Williamson - 2) | 1.95 (Note: Bennet - 0.78 Booker - 0.13 Castro - 0.13 De La Fuente - 0.13 Delaney - 0.26 Patrick - 0.26 Williamson - 0.26) | 774 | 5.72 |
| Lipscomb | 18 | 36.73 | 7 | 14.29 | 3 | 6.12 | 0 | 0.00 | 3 | 6.12 | 9 | 18.37 | 0 | 0.00 | 7 | 14.29 | 2 (Note: Booker - 1 Delaney - 1) | 4.08 (Note: Booker - 2.04 Delaney - 2.04) | 49 | 2.49 |
| Live Oak | 164 | 51.57 | 57 | 17.92 | 5 | 1.57 | 3 | 0.94 | 6 | 1.89 | 48 | 15.09 | 4 | 1.26 | 18 | 5.66 | 13 (Note: Booker - 1 Castro - 6 De La Fuente - 1 Patrick - 4 Yang - 1) | 4.08 (Note: Booker - 0.31 Castro - 1.89 De La Fuente - 0.31 Patrick - 1.26 Yang - 0.31) | 318 | 4.33 |
| Llano | 544 | 40.57 | 248 | 18.49 | 79 | 5.89 | 4 | 0.30 | 64 | 4.77 | 245 | 18.27 | 27 | 2.01 | 122 | 9.10 | 8 (Note: Booker - 3 Delaney - 2 Patrick - 1 Wells - 1 Yang - 1) | 0.58 (Note: Booker - 0.22 Delaney - 0.15 Patrick - 0.07 Wells - 0.07 Yang - 0.07) | 1,341 | 8.47 |
| Loving | 1 | 11.11 | 2 | 22.22 | 2 | 22.22 | 1 | 11.11 | 0 | 0.00 | 3 | 33.33 | 0 | 0.00 | 0 | 0.00 | 0 | 0.00 | 9 | 8.04 |
| Lubbock | 4,481 | 30.63 | 1,801 | 12.31 | 700 | 4.79 | 93 | 0.64 | 517 | 3.53 | 4,577 | 31.29 | 43 | 0.29 | 1,778 | 12.15 | 639 (Note: Bennet - 15 Booker - 94 Castro - 307 De La Fuente - 9 Delaney - 93 Patrick - 7 Wells - 22 Williamson - 48 Yang - 44) | 4.37 (Note: Bennet - 0.10 Booker - 0.64 Castro - 2.10 De La Fuente - 0.06 Delaney - 0.64 Patrick - 0.05 Wells - 0.15 Williamson - 0.33 Yang - 0.30) | 14,629 | 8.23 |
| Lynn | 36 | 49.32 | 17 | 23.29 | 2 | 2.74 | 0 | 0.00 | 1 | 1.37 | 14 | 19.18 | 0 | 0.00 | 2 | 2.74 | 1 (Note: Delaney - 1) | 1.37 (Note: Delaney - 1.37) | 73 | 1.86 |
| Madison | 10 | 51.45 | 32 | 10.29 | 8 | 2.57 | 1 | 0.32 | 2 | 0.64 | 79 | 25.40 | 2 | 0.64 | 20 | 6.43 | 7 (Note: Bennet - 1 Booker - 1 De La Fuente - 1 Delaney - 1 Patrick - 1 Williamson - 1 Yang - 1) | 2.24 (Note: Bennet - 0.32 Booker - 0.32 De La Fuente - 0.32 Delaney - 0.32 Patrick - 0.32 Williamson - 0.32 Yang - 0.32) | 311 | 4.11 |
| Marion | 373 | 59.97 | 83 | 13.34 | 3 | 0.48 | 0 | 0.00 | 7 | 1.13 | 106 | 17.04 | 6 | 0.96 | 32 | 5.14 | 12 (Note: Bennet - 4 Booker - 2 Delaney - 1 Patrick - 1 Wells - 1 Williamson - 2 Yang - 1) | 1.92 (Note: Bennet - 0.64 Booker - 0.32 Delaney - 0.16 Patrick - 0.16 Wells - 0.16 Williamson - 0.32 Yang - 0.16) | 622 | 8.44 |
| Martin | 16 | 30.77 | 4 | 7.69 | 5 | 9.62 | 0 | 0.00 | 1 | 1.92 | 20 | 38.46 | 0 | 0.00 | 3 | 5.77 | 3 (Note: Booker - 1 Castro - 1 Patrick - 1) | 5.76 (Note: Booker - 1.92 Castro - 1.92 Patrick - 1.92) | 52 | 1.56 |
| Mason | 86 | 40.95 | 34 | 16.19 | 11 | 5.24 | 1 | 0.48 | 12 | 5.71 | 35 | 16.67 | 11 | 5.24 | 15 | 7.14 | 5 (Note: Castro - 2 Wells - 2 Yang - 1) | 2.38 (Note: Castro - 0.95 Wells - 0.95 Yang - 0.48) | 210 | 6.89 |
| Matagorda | 680 | 48.33 | 217 | 15.42 | 38 | 2.70 | 4 | 0.28 | 27 | 1.92 | 295 | 20.97 | 17 | 1.21 | 89 | 6.33 | 40 (Note: Bennet - 6 Booker - 6 Castro - 6 De La Fuente - 7 Delaney - 6 Patrick - 5 Wells - 1 Yang - 3) | 2.86 (Note: Bennet - 0.43 Booker - 0.43 Castro - 0.43 De La Fuente - 0.50 Delaney - 0.43 Patrick - 0.36 Wells - 0.07 Yang - 0.21) | 1,407 | 6.56 |
| Maverick | 1,150 | 14.39 | 1,419 | 17.75 | 171 | 2.14 | 122 | 1.53 | 103 | 1.29 | 2,726 | 34.10 | 144 | 1.80 | 425 | 5.32 | 1,733 (Note: Bennet - 151 Booker - 37 Castro - 979 De La Fuente - 334 Delaney - 41 Patrick - 20 Wells - 43 Williamson - 42 Yang - 86) | 21.69 (Note: Bennet - 1.89 Booker - 0.46 Castro - 12.25 De La Fuente - 4.18 Delaney - 0.51 Patrick - 0.25 Wells - 0.54 Williamson - 0.53 Yang - 1.08) | 7,993 | 24.51 |
| McCulloch | 69 | 44.23 | 27 | 17.31 | 2 | 1.28 | 0 | 0.00 | 3 | 1.92 | 31 | 19.87 | 1 | 0.64 | 15 | 9.62 | 8 (Note: Castro - 5 De La Fuente - 3) | 5.13 (Note: Castro - 3.21 De La Fuente - 1.92) | 156 | 2.97 |
| McLennan | 5,384 | 41.68 | 1,687 | 13.06 | 436 | 3.38 | 39 | 0.30 | 286 | 2.21 | 3,086 | 23.89 | 49 | 0.38 | 1,660 | 12.85 | 290 (Note: Bennet - 22 Booker - 28 Castro - 136 De La Fuente - 16 Delaney - 20 Patrick - 5 Williamson - 30 Yang - 33) | 2.24 (Note: Bennet - 0.17 Booker - 0.22 Castro - 1.05 De La Fuente - 0.12 Delaney - 0.15 Patrick - 0.04 Williamson - 0.23 Yang - 0.26) | 12,917 | 8.99 |
| McMullen | 8 | 42.11 | 10 | 52.63 | 1 | 5.26 | 0 | 0.00 | 0 | 0.00 | 0 | 0.00 | 0 | 0.00 | 0 | 0.00 | 0 | 0.00 | 19 | 2.72 |
| Medina | 881 | 38.09 | 300 | 12.97 | 133 | 5.75 | 6 | 0.26 | 70 | 3.03 | 561 | 24.25 | 37 | 1.60 | 231 | 9.99 | 94 (Note: Bennet - 3 Booker - 2 Castro - 53 De La Fuente - 1 Delaney - 8 Patrick - 2 Wells - 3 Williamson - 13 Yang - 9) | 4.07 (Note: Bennet - 0.13 Booker - 0.09 Castro - 2.29 De La Fuente - 0.04 Delaney - 0.35 Patrick - 0.09 Wells - 0.13 Williamson - 0.56 Yang - 0.39) | 2,313 | 7.17 |
| Menard | 26 | 42.62 | 7 | 11.48 | 3 | 4.92 | 0 | 0.00 | 0 | 0.00 | 18 | 29.51 | 0 | 0.00 | 7 | 11.48 | 0 | 0.00 | 61 | 4.32 |
| Midland | 1,507 | 38.50 | 599 | 15.30 | 158 | 4.04 | 23 | 0.59 | 88 | 2.25 | 994 | 25.40 | 5 | 0.13 | 422 | 10.78 | 118 (Note: Bennet - 8 Booker - 16 Castro - 40 De La Fuente - 13 Delaney - 10 Patrick - 2 Wells - 3 Williamson - 12 Yang - 14) | 3.02 (Note: Bennet - 0.20 Booker - 0.41 Castro - 1.02 De La Fuente - 0.33 Delaney - 0.26 Patrick - 0.05 Wells - 0.08 Williamson - 0.31 Yang - 0.36) | 3,914 | 4.49 |
| Milam | 428 | 40.42 | 179 | 16.90 | 37 | 3.49 | 3 | 0.28 | 20 | 1.89 | 270 | 25.50 | 16 | 1.51 | 86 | 8.12 | 20 (Note: Bennet - 3 Booker - 1 Castro - 1 De La Fuente - 2 Delaney - 3 Patrick - 1 Wells - 1 Williamson - 1 Yang - 7) | 1.86 (Note: Bennet - 0.28 Booker - 0.09 Castro - 0.09 De La Fuente - 0.19 Delaney - 0.28 Patrick - 0.09 Wells - 0.09 Williamson - 0.09 Yang - 0.66) | 1,059 | 7.00 |
| Mills | 30 | 31.37 | 19 | 18.63 | 9 | 8.82 | 0 | 0.00 | 4 | 3.92 | 32 | 31.37 | 0 | 0.00 | 8 | 7.84 | 0 | 0.00 | 102 | 3.04 |
| Mitchell | 69 | 51.49 | 21 | 15.67 | 4 | 2.99 | 0 | 0.00 | 3 | 2.24 | 25 | 18.66 | 1 | 0.75 | 5 | 3.73 | 6 (Note: Castro - 2 Delaney - 1 Wells - 2 Williamson - 1) | 4.48 (Note: Castro - 1.49 Delaney - 0.75 Wells - 1.49 Williamson - 0.75) | 134 | 3.03 |
| Montague | 211 | 43.96 | 77 | 16.04 | 14 | 2.92 | 2 | 0.42 | 19 | 3.96 | 112 | 23.33 | 4 | 0.83 | 33 | 6.88 | 8 (Note: Bennet - 2 Booker - 2 Delaney - 3 Yang - 1) | 1.67 (Note: Bennet - 0.42 Booker - 0.42 Delaney - 0.62 Yang - 0.21) | 480 | 3.54 |
| Montgomery | 9,995 | 39.02 | 3,749 | 14.64 | 1,312 | 5.12 | 123 | 0.48 | 795 | 3.10 | 6,483 | 25.31 | 141 | 0.55 | 2,839 | 11.08 | 175 (Note: Bennet - 26 Booker - 21 Castro - 27 De La Fuente - 6 Delaney - 2 Patrick - 8 Wells - 7 Williamson - 12 Yang - 66) | 0.69 (Note: Bennet - 0.10 Booker - 0.08 Castro - 0.11 De La Fuente - 0.02 Delaney - 0.01 Patrick - 0.03 Wells - 0.03 Williamson - 0.05 Yang - 0.26) | 25,612 | 7.32 |
| Moore | 119 | 41.32 | 38 | 13.19 | 11 | 3.82 | 3 | 1.04 | 2 | 0.69 | 77 | 26.74 | 1 | 0.35 | 20 | 6.94 | 17 (Note: Bennet - 5 Booker - 2 Castro - 2 De La Fuente - 2 Patrick - 1 Wells - 2 Williamson - 1 Yang - 2) | 5.89 (Note: Bennet - 1.74 Booker - 0.69 Castro - 0.69 De La Fuente - 0.69 Patrick - 0.35 Wells - 0.69 Williamson - 0.35 Yang - 0.69) | 288 | 2.93 |
| Morris | 328 | 52.99 | 109 | 17.61 | 5 | 0.81 | 5 | 0.81 | 3 | 0.48 | 120 | 19.39 | 7 | 1.13 | 30 | 4.85 | 12 (Note: Bennet - 1 Booker - 4 De La Fuente - 2 Delaney - 3 Williamson - 1 Yang - 1) | 1.93 (Note: Bennet - 0.16 Booker - 0.65 De La Fuente - 0.32 Delaney - 0.48 Williamson - 0.16 Yang - 0.16) | 619 | 7.41 |
| Motley | 8 | 44.44 | 4 | 22.22 | 0 | 0.00 | 0 | 0.00 | 0 | 0.00 | 3 | 16.67 | 0 | 0.00 | 3 | 16.67 | 0 | 0.00 | 18 | 2.16 |
| Nacogdoches | 1,370 | 40.38 | 404 | 11.91 | 93 | 2.74 | 14 | 0.41 | 66 | 1.95 | 988 | 29.12 | 12 | 0.35 | 405 | 11.94 | 41 (Note: Bennet - 8 Booker - 5 Castro - 1 De La Fuente - 1 Delaney - 5 Patrick - 2 Williamson - 2 Yang - 17) | 1.22 (Note: Bennet - 0.24 Booker - 0.15 Castro - 0.03 De La Fuente - 0.03 Delaney - 0.15 Patrick - 0.06 Williamson - 0.06 Yang - 0.50) | 3,393 | 9.03 |
| Nevarro | 891 | 46.87 | 343 | 18.04 | 45 | 2.37 | 3 | 0.16 | 29 | 1.53 | 423 | 22.25 | 15 | 0.79 | 112 | 5.89 | 40 (Note: Bennet - 7 Booker - 9 Castro - 5 De La Fuente - 1 Delaney - 7 Wells - 3 Williamson - 3 Yang - 5) | 2.10 (Note: Bennet - 0.37 Booker - 0.47 Castro - 0.26 De La Fuente - 0.05 Delaney - 0.37 Wells - 0.16 Williamson - 0.16 Yang - 0.26) | 1,901 | 6.52 |
| Newton | 196 | 55.21 | 67 | 18.87 | 3 | 0.85 | 2 | 0.56 | 2 | 0.56 | 62 | 17.46 | 4 | 1.13 | 11 | 3.10 | 8 (Note: Bennet - 1 Booker - 2 Delaney - 2 Williamson - 2 Yang - 1) | 2.24 (Note: Bennet - 0.28 Booker - 0.56 Delaney - 0.56 Williamson - 0.56 Yang - 0.28) | 355 | 3.86 |
| Nolan | 171 | 43.62 | 46 | 11.73 | 11 | 2.81 | 1 | 0.26 | 9 | 2.30 | 107 | 27.30 | 6 | 1.53 | 34 | 8.67 | 7 (Note: Castro - 3 De La Fuente - 1 Delaney - 1 Patrick - 1 Williamson - 1) | 1.81 (Note: Castro - 0.77 De La Fuente - 0.26 Delaney - 0.26 Patrick - 0.26 Williamson - 0.26) | 392 | 4.49 |
| Nueces | 8,588 | 37.92 | 4,268 | 18.84 | 835 | 3.69 | 70 | 0.31 | 549 | 2.42 | 5,661 | 24.99 | 104 | 0.46 | 1,994 | 8.80 | 581 (Note: Bennet - 115 Booker - 49 Castro - 107 De La Fuente - 139 Delaney - 93 Patrick - 8 Wells - 2 Williamson - 10 Yang - 58) | 2.57 (Note: Bennet - 0.51 Booker - 0.22 Castro - 0.47 De La Fuente - 0.61 Delaney - 0.41 Patrick - 0.04 Wells - 0.01 Williamson - 0.04 Yang - 0.26) | 22,650 | 11.11 |
| Ochiltree | 33 | 38.82 | 14 | 16.47 | 3 | 3.53 | 1 | 1.18 | 0 | 0.00 | 21 | 24.71 | 1 | 1.18 | 9 | 10.59 | 3 (Note: Bennet - 1 Williamson - 2) | 3.53 (Note: Bennet - 1.18 Williamson - 2.35) | 85 | 1.66 |
| Oldham | 16 | 40.00 | 8 | 20.00 | 1 | 2.50 | 0 | 0.00 | 1 | 2.50 | 9 | 22.50 | 0 | 0.00 | 5 | 12.50 | 0 | 0.00 | 40 | 2.88 |
| Orange | 1,163 | 44.02 | 495 | 18.74 | 88 | 3.33 | 11 | 0.42 | 58 | 2.20 | 574 | 21.73 | 16 | 0.61 | 185 | 7.00 | 52 (Note: Bennet - 20 Booker - 2 Castro - 5 De La Fuente - 4 Delaney - 5 Patrick - 2 Wells - 2 Williamson - 4 Yang - 8) | 1.98 (Note: Bennet - 0.76 Booker - 0.08 Castro - 0.19 De La Fuente - 0.15 Delaney - 0.19 Patrick - 0.08 Wells - 0.08 Williamson - 0.15 Yang - 0.30) | 2,642 | 5.01 |
| Palo Pinto | 347 | 39.08 | 170 | 19.14 | 35 | 3.94 | 5 | 0.56 | 25 | 2.82 | 205 | 23.09 | 10 | 1.13 | 59 | 6.64 | 32 (Note: Bennet - 11 Booker - 4 Castro - 2 De La Fuente - 4 Delaney - 4 Patrick - 1 Wells - 3 Williamson - 1 Yang - 2) | 3.61 (Note: Bennet - 1.24 Booker - 0.45 Castro - 0.23 De La Fuente - 0.45 Delaney - 0.45 Patrick - 0.11 Wells - 0.34 Williamson - 0.11 Yang - 0.23) | 888 | 4.84 |
| Panola | 493 | 58.69 | 117 | 13.93 | 18 | 2.14 | 4 | 0.48 | 11 | 1.31 | 129 | 15.36 | 3 | 0.36 | 48 | 5.71 | 17 (Note: Bennet - 7 Booker - 2 Delaney - 3 Wells - 2 Williamson - 2 Yang - 1) | 2.03 (Note: Bennet - 0.83 Booker - 0.24 Delaney - 0.36 Wells - 0.24 Williamson - 0.24 Yang - 0.12) | 840 | 5.12 |
| Parker | 2,064 | 38.74 | 809 | 15.18 | 266 | 4.99 | 13 | 0.24 | 181 | 3.40 | 1,348 | 25.30 | 41 | 0.77 | 544 | 10.21 | 62 (Note: Bennet - 2 Booker - 4 Castro - 7 De La Fuente - 7 Delaney - 21 Wells - 4 Williamson - 7 Yang - 10) | 1.17 (Note: Bennet - 0.04 Booker - 0.08 Castro - 0.13 De La Fuente - 0.13 Delaney - 0.39 Wells - 0.08 Williamson - 0.13 Yang - 0.19) | 5,328 | 5.49 |
| Parmer | 48 | 42.11 | 19 | 16.67 | 0 | 0.00 | 1 | 0.88 | 2 | 1.75 | 31 | 27.19 | 2 | 1.75 | 8 | 7.02 | 3 (Note: Castro - 3) | 2.63 (Note: Castro - 2.63) | 114 | 2.57 |
| Pecos | 222 | 25.61 | 219 | 25.26 | 39 | 4.50 | 8 | 0.92 | 14 | 1.61 | 218 | 25.14 | 10 | 1.15 | 60 | 6.92 | 77 (Note: Bennet - 6 Booker - 8 Castro - 27 De La Fuente - 14 Delaney - 5 Patrick - 2 Wells - 5 Williamson - 3 Yang - 7) | 8.88 (Note: Bennet - 0.69 Booker - 0.92 Castro - 3.11 De La Fuente - 1.61 Delaney - 0.58 Patrick - 0.23 Wells - 0.58 Williamson - 0.35 Yang - 0.81) | 867 | 10.59 |
| Polk | 580 | 35.41 | 315 | 19.23 | 106 | 6.47 | 6 | 0.37 | 73 | 4.46 | 334 | 20.39 | 28 | 1.71 | 181 | 11.05 | 15 (Note: Bennet - 1 Castro - 2 De La Fuente - 1 Delaney - 3 Patrick - 1 Wells - 2 Williamson - 3 Yang - 2) | 0.90 (Note: Bennet - 0.06 Castro - 0.12 De La Fuente - 0.06 Delaney - 0.18 Patrick - 0.06 Wells - 0.12 Williamson - 0.18 Yang - 0.12) | 1,638 | 4.21 |
| Potter | 1,215 | 34.64 | 520 | 14.82 | 184 | 5.25 | 13 | 0.37 | 85 | 2.42 | 1,055 | 30.07 | 38 | 1.08 | 308 | 8.78 | 90 (Note: Bennet - 12 Booker - 7 Castro - 27 De La Fuente - 9 Delaney - 8 Patrick - 1 Wells - 3 Williamson - 8 Yang - 15) | 2.58 (Note: Bennet - 0.34 Booker - 0.20 Castro - 0.77 De La Fuente - 0.26 Delaney - 0.23 Patrick - 0.03 Wells - 0.09 Williamson - 0.23 Yang - 0.43) | 3,508 | 6.28 |
| Presidio | 168 | 16.63 | 137 | 13.56 | 22 | 2.18 | 5 | 0.50 | 22 | 2.18 | 415 | 41.09 | 10 | 0.99 | 103 | 10.20 | 128 (Note: Bennet - 20 Booker - 5 Castro - 53 De La Fuente - 26 Delaney - 10 Patrick - 2 Wells - 4 Williamson - 3 Yang - 5) | 12.69 (Note: Bennet - 1.98 Booker - 0.50 Castro - 5.25 De La Fuente - 2.57 Delaney - 0.99 Patrick - 0.20 Wells - 0.40 Williamson - 0.30 Yang - 0.50) | 1,010 | 21.21 |
| Rains | 176 | 43.35 | 81 | 19.95 | 13 | 3.20 | 4 | 0.99 | 13 | 3.20 | 71 | 17.49 | 7 | 1.72 | 26 | 6.40 | 15 (Note: Bennet - 5 Booker - 3 Castro - 2 De La Fuente - 2 Delaney - 1 Williamson - 1 Yang - 1) | 3.70 (Note: Bennet - 1.23 Booker - 0.74 Castro - 0.49 De La Fuente - 0.49 Delaney - 0.25 Williamson - 0.25 Yang - 0.25) | 406 | 5.18 |
| Randall | 1,591 | 33.62 | 623 | 13.16 | 267 | 5.64 | 34 | 0.72 | 124 | 2.62 | 1,414 | 29.88 | 48 | 1.01 | 577 | 12.19 | 55 (Note: Bennet - 5 Booker - 3 Castro - 14 De La Fuente - 3 Wells - 9 Yang - 21) | 1.16 (Note: Bennet - 0.11 Booker - 0.06 Castro - 0.30 De La Fuente - 0.06 Wells - 0.19 Yang - 0.44) | 4,733 | 5.31 |
| Reagan | 9 | 33.33 | 8 | 29.63 | 3 | 11.11 | 0 | 0.00 | 0 | 0.00 | 7 | 25.93 | 0 | 0.00 | 0 | 0.00 | 0 | 0.00 | 27 | 1.46 |
| Real | 47 | 34.81 | 15 | 11.11 | 5 | 3.70 | 1 | 0.74 | 7 | 5.19 | 39 | 28.89 | 2 | 1.48 | 15 | 11.11 | 4 (Note: Bennet - 3 Castro - 1) | 2.96 (Note: Bennet - 2.22 Castro - 0.74) | 135 | 5.21 |
| Red River | 273 | 51.22 | 83 | 15.57 | 9 | 1.69 | 1 | 0.19 | 9 | 1.69 | 114 | 21.39 | 8 | 1.50 | 26 | 4.88 | 10 (Note: Bennet - 1 Booker - 2 Castro - 2 Delaney - 1 Patrick - 1 Yang - 3) | 1.89 (Note: Bennet - 0.19 Booker - 0.38 Castro - 0.38 Delaney - 0.19 Patrick - 0.19 Yang - 0.56) | 533 | 6.47 |
| Reeves | 328 | 22.45 | 345 | 23.61 | 52 | 3.56 | 30 | 2.05 | 26 | 1.78 | 313 | 21.42 | 10 | 0.68 | 80 | 5.48 | 277 (Note: Bennet - 31 Booker - 19 Castro - 113 De La Fuente - 46 Delaney - 9 Patrick - 9 Wells - 13 Williamson - 8 Yang - 29) | 18.96 (Note: Bennet - 2.12 Booker - 1.30 Castro - 7.73 De La Fuente - 3.15 Delaney - 0.62 Patrick - 0.62 Wells - 0.89 Williamson - 0.55 Yang - 1.98) | 1,461 | 19.65 |
| Refugio | 158 | 35.35 | 127 | 28.41 | 18 | 4.03 | 2 | 0.45 | 4 | 0.89 | 67 | 14.99 | 10 | 2.24 | 25 | 5.59 | 36 (Note: Bennet - 5 Booker - 3 Castro - 12 De La Fuente - 2 Delaney - 3 Williamson - 9 Yang - 2) | 8.05 (Note: Bennet - 1.12 Booker - 0.67 Castro - 2.68 De La Fuente - 0.45 Delaney - 0.67 Williamson - 2.01 Yang - 0.45) | 447 | 9.16 |
| Roberts | 1 | 9.09 | 6 | 54.55 | 2 | 18.18 | 0 | 0.00 | 1 | 9.09 | 0 | 0.00 | 0 | 0.00 | 1 | 9.09 | 0 | 0.00 | 11 | 1.55 |
| Robertson | 479 | 52.70 | 160 | 17.60 | 24 | 2.64 | 2 | 0.22 | 18 | 1.98 | 159 | 17.49 | 6 | 0.66 | 41 | 4.51 | 20 (Note: Bennet - 4 Booker - 6 Castro - 1 De La Fuente - 1 Delaney - 4 Williamson - 1 Yang - 3) | 2.20 (Note: Bennet - 0.44 Booker - 0.66 Castro - 0.11 De La Fuente - 0.11 Delaney - 0.44 Williamson - 0.11 Yang - 0.33) | 909 | 7.89 |
| Rockwall | 2,407 | 40.53 | 789 | 13.29 | 306 | 5.15 | 22 | 0.37 | 166 | 2.80 | 1,507 | 25.37 | 52 | 0.88 | 625 | 10.52 | 55 (Note: Bennet - 7 Booker - 8 Castro - 8 De La Fuente - 2 Patrick - 3 Wells - 2 Williamson - 1 Yang - 24) | 1.08 (Note: Bennet - 0.12 Booker - 0.13 Castro - 0.13 De La Fuente - 0.03 Patrick - 0.05 Wells - 0.03 Williamson - 0.02 Yang - 0.57) | 5,939 | 8.97 |
| Runnels | 77 | 46.11 | 18 | 10.78 | 14 | 8.38 | 0 | 0.00 | 8 | 4.79 | 28 | 16.77 | 1 | 0.60 | 15 | 8.98 | 6 (Note: Booker - 1 Castro - 3 Patrick - 2) | 3.60 (Note: Booker - 0.60 Castro - 1.80 Patrick - 1.20) | 167 | 2.43 |
| Rusk | 1,016 | 55.25 | 326 | 17.73 | 3 | 1.96 | 8 | 0.44 | 32 | 1.74 | 282 | 15.33 | 8 | 0.44 | 93 | 5.06 | 38 (Note: Bennet - 13 Booker - 1 Castro - 5 De La Fuente - 4 Delaney - 3 Patrick - 1 Wells - 5 Williamson - 1 Yang - 5) | 2.05 (Note: Bennet - 0.71 Booker - 0.05 Castro - 0.27 De La Fuente - 0.22 Delaney - 0.16 Patrick - 0.05 Wells - 0.27 Williamson - 0.05 Yang - 0.27) | 1,839 | 5.88 |
| Sabine | 167 | 50.45 | 64 | 19.34 | 7 | 2.11 | 2 | 0.60 | 8 | 2.42 | 46 | 13.90 | 2 | 0.60 | 22 | 6.65 | 13 (Note: Booker - 1 Castro - 2 De La Fuente - 2 Delaney - 6 Yang - 2) | 3.91 (Note: Booker - 0.30 Castro - 0.60 De La Fuente - 0.60 Delaney - 1.81 Yang - 0.60) | 331 | 4.20 |
| San Augustine | 274 | 57.44 | 91 | 19.08 | 6 | 1.26 | 0 | 0.00 | 2 | 0.42 | 67 | 14.05 | 2 | 0.42 | 19 | 3.98 | 17 (Note: Bennet - 5 Booker - 2 Castro - 1 De La Fuente - 2 Delaney - 3 Wells - 2 Williamson - 2) | 3.36 (Note: Bennet - 1.05 Booker - 0.42 Castro - 0.21 De La Fuente - 0.42 Delaney - 0.63 Wells - 0.21 Williamson - 0.42) | 477 | 7.98 |
| San Jacinto | 456 | 52.66 | 125 | 14.43 | 21 | 2.42 | 2 | 0.23 | 12 | 1.39 | 169 | 19.52 | 12 | 1.39 | 57 | 6.58 | 12 (Note: Bennet - 1 De La Fuente - 1 Delaney - 1 Patrick - 1 Wells - 1 Williamson - 3 Yang - 4) | 1.41 (Note: Bennet - 0.12 De La Fuente - 0.12 Delaney - 0.12 Patrick - 0.12 Wells - 0.12 Williamson - 0.35 Yang - 0.46) | 866 | 4.75 |
| San Patricio | 1,825 | 43.04 | 646 | 15.24 | 102 | 2.41 | 20 | 0.47 | 74 | 1.75 | 1,077 | 25.40 | 19 | 0.45 | 330 | 7.78 | 147 (Note: Bennet - 15 Booker - 8 Castro - 76 De La Fuente - 23 Delaney - 5 Patrick - 8 Wells - 4 Yang - 8) | 3.46 (Note: Bennet - 0.35 Booker - 0.19 Castro - 1.79 De La Fuente - 0.54 Delaney - 0.12 Patrick - 0.19 Wells - 0.09 Yang - 0.19) | 4,240 | 10.15 |
| San Saba | 22 | 21.15 | 19 | 18.27 | 13 | 12.50 | 1 | 0.96 | 6 | 5.77 | 10 | 9.62 | 0 | 0.00 | 29 | 27.88 | 4 (Note: Castro - 1 Patrick - 1 Wells - 2) | 3.84 (Note: Castro - 0.96 Patrick - 0.96 Wells - 1.92) | 104 | 2.84 |
| Schleicher | 45 | 36.89 | 21 | 17.21 | 0 | 0.00 | 0 | 0.00 | 7 | 5.74 | 29 | 23.77 | 1 | 0.82 | 11 | 9.02 | 8 (Note: Booker - 1 Castro - 4 De La Fuente - 1 Delaney - 2) | 6.56 (Note: Booker - 0.82 Castro - 3.28 De La Fuente - 0.82 Delaney - 1.64) | 122 | 7.32 |
| Scurry | 98 | 38.28 | 31 | 12.11 | 10 | 3.91 | 2 | 0.78 | 8 | 3.12 | 77 | 30.08 | 1 | 0.39 | 23 | 8.98 | 6 (Note: Bennet - 1 Castro - 1 Delaney - 1 Wells - 1 Yang - 2) | 2.34 (Note: Bennet - 0.39 Castro - 0.39 Delaney - 0.39 Wells - 0.39 Yang - 0.78) | 256 | 2.74 |
| Shackelford | 27 | 50.00 | 3 | 5.56 | 5 | 9.26 | 0 | 0.00 | 2 | 3.70 | 13 | 24.07 | 1 | 1.85 | 2 | 3.70 | 1 (Note: Williamson - 1) | 1.85 (Note: Williamson - 1.85) | 54 | 2.35 |
| Shelby | 261 | 57.24 | 72 | 15.79 | 4 | 0.88 | 0 | 0.00 | 11 | 2.41 | 80 | 17.54 | 2 | 0.44 | 20 | 4.39 | 6 (Note: Bennet - 4 Booker - 1 Delaney - 1) | 1.32 (Note: Bennet - 0.88 Booker - 0.22 Delaney - 0.22) | 456 | 2.97 |
| Sherman | 18 | 42.86 | 5 | 11.90 | 1 | 2.38 | 2 | 4.76 | 0 | 0.00 | 10 | 23.81 | 0 | 0.00 | 2 | 4.76 | 4 (Note: Bennet - 1 De La Fuente - 1 Wells - 2) | 9.48 (Note: Bennet - 2.38 De La Fuente - 2.38 Wells - 4.76) | 42 | 2.84 |
| Smith | 5,378 | 45.92 | 1,827 | 15.60 | 394 | 3.36 | 57 | 0.49 | 196 | 1.67 | 2,636 | 22.51 | 81 | 0.69 | 817 | 6.98 | 325 (Note: Bennet - 24 Booker - 22 Castro - 81 De La Fuente - 7 Delaney - 4 Patrick - 5 Wells - 6 Williamson - 122 Yang - 54) | 2.76 (Note: Bennet - 0.20 Booker - 0.19 Castro - 0.69 De La Fuente - 0.06 Delaney - 0.03 Patrick - 0.04 Wells - 0.05 Williamson - 1.04 Yang - 0.46) | 11,711 | 8.32 |
| Somervell | 94 | 29.56 | 56 | 17.61 | 13 | 4.09 | 2 | 0.63 | 11 | 3.46 | 95 | 29.87 | 4 | 1.26 | 36 | 11.32 | 7 (Note: Booker - 1 Castro - 3 Wells - 2 Yang - 1) | 2.19 (Note: Booker - 0.31 Castro - 0.94 Wells - 0.63 Yang - 0.31) | 318 | 4.91 |
| Starr | 1,048 | 13.77 | 1,258 | 16.53 | 188 | 2.47 | 55 | 0.72 | 90 | 1.18 | 3,167 | 41.61 | 61 | 0.80 | 326 | 4.28 | 1,419 (Note: Bennet - 167 Booker - 45 Castro - 430 De La Fuente - 437 Delaney - 45 Patrick - 24 Wells - 120 Williamson - 63 Yang - 88) | 18.65 (Note: Bennet - 2.19 Booker - 0.59 Castro - 5.65 De La Fuente - 5.74 Delaney - 0.59 Patrick - 0.32 Wells - 1.58 Williamson - 0.83 Yang - 1.16) | 7,612 | 22.70 |
| Stephens | 69 | 47.59 | 18 | 12.41 | 9 | 6.21 | 0 | 0.00 | 6 | 4.14 | 24 | 16.55 | 0 | 0.00 | 15 | 10.34 | 4 (Note: Bennet - 3 Booker - 1) | 2.76 (Note: Bennet - 2.07 Booker - 0.69) | 145 | 2.62 |
| Sterling | 5 | 27.78 | 1 | 5.56 | 0 | 0.00 | 0 | 0.00 | 3 | 16.67 | 7 | 38.89 | 0 | 0.00 | 2 | 11.11 | 0 | 0.00 | 18 | 2.01 |
| Stonewall | 35 | 47.30 | 14 | 18.92 | 3 | 4.05 | 0 | 0.00 | 3 | 4.05 | 6 | 8.11 | 3 | 4.05 | 9 | 12.16 | 1 (Note: Wells - 1) | 1.35 (Note: Wells - 1.35) | 74 | 7.88 |
| Sutton | 28 | 36.36 | 11 | 14.29 | 3 | 3.90 | 0 | 0.00 | 0 | 0.00 | 20 | 25.97 | 0 | 0.00 | 11 | 14.29 | 4 (Note: Castro - 3 Yang - 1) | 5.20 (Note: Castro - 3.90 Yang - 1.30) | 77 | 3.19 |
| Swisher | 94 | 45.63 | 52 | 25.24 | 2 | 0.97 | 0 | 0.00 | 3 | 1.46 | 24 | 11.65 | 2 | 0.97 | 20 | 9.71 | 9 (Note: Bennet - 1 Booker - 1 Castro - 3 Delaney - 1 Patrick - 1 Wells - 1 Williamson - 1) | 4.40 (Note: Bennet - 0.49 Booker - 0.49 Castro - 1.46 Delaney - 0.49 Patrick - 0.49 Wells - 0.49 Williamson - 0.49) | 206 | 5.31 |
| Tarrant | 59,267 | 38.21 | 19,273 | 12.43 | 6,316 | 4.07 | 389 | 0.25 | 3,011 | 1.94 | 47,506 | 30.63 | 958 | 0.62 | 15,158 | 9.77 | 3,235 (Note: Bennet - 1,265 Booker - 237 Castro - 562 De La Fuente - 32 Delaney - 243 Patrick - 125 Wells - 106 Williamson - 330 Yang - 335) | 2.09 (Note: Bennet - 0.82 Booker - 0.15 Castro - 0.36 De La Fuente - 0.02 Delaney - 0.16 Patrick - 0.08 Wells - 0.07 Williamson - 0.21 Yang - 0.22) | 155,113 | 13.30 |
| Taylor | 1,939 | 39.92 | 384 | 7.91 | 219 | 4.51 | 20 | 0.41 | 158 | 3.25 | 1,388 | 28.58 | 28 | 0.58 | 601 | 12.37 | 120 (Note: Bennet - 6 Booker - 16 Castro - 50 De La Fuente - 4 Delaney - 11 Patrick - 3 Williamson - 4 Yang - 26) | 2.47 (Note: Bennet - 0.12 Booker - 0.33 Castro - 1.03 De La Fuente - 0.08 Delaney - 0.23 Patrick - 0.06 Williamson - 0.08 Yang - 0.54) | 4,857 | 6.05 |
| Terrell | 36 | 20.93 | 28 | 16.28 | 11 | 6.40 | 13 | 7.56 | 9 | 5.23 | 23 | 13.37 | 3 | 1.74 | 11 | 6.40 | 38 (Note: Bennet - 1 Booker - 2 Castro - 16 De La Fuente - 9 Delaney - 2 Patrick - 2 Wells - 2 Yang - 4) | 22.08 (Note: Bennet - 0.58 Booker - 1.16 Castro - 9.30 De La Fuente - 5.23 Delaney - 1.16 Patrick - 1.16 Wells - 1.16 Yang - 2.33) | 172 | 25.48 |
| Terry | 75 | 31.65 | 60 | 25.32 | 8 | 3.38 | 1 | 0.42 | 5 | 2.11 | 63 | 26.58 | 3 | 1.27 | 16 | 6.75 | 6 (Note: Castro - 3 Delaney - 1 Wells - 1 Yang - 1) | 2.53 (Note: Castro - 1.27 Delaney - 0.42 Wells - 0.42 Yang - 0.42) | 237 | 3.63 |
| Throckmorton | 18 | 69.23 | 4 | 15.38 | 0 | 0.00 | 0 | 0.00 | 0 | 0.00 | 4 | 15.38 | 0 | 0.00 | 0 | 0.00 | 0 | 0.00 | 26 | 2.23 |
| Titus | 436 | 46.88 | 166 | 17.85 | 17 | 1.83 | 6 | 0.65 | 22 | 2.37 | 205 | 22.04 | 1 | 0.11 | 46 | 4.95 | 31 (Note: Bennet - 7 Booker - 2 Castro - 3 De La Fuente - 4 Delaney - 3 Patrick - 5 Wells - 4 Williamson - 1 Yang - 2) | 3.34 (Note: Bennet - 0.75 Booker - 0.22 Castro - 0.32 De La Fuente - 0.43 Delaney - 0.32 Patrick - 0.54 Wells - 0.43 Williamson - 0.11 Yang - 0.22) | 930 | 5.35 |
| Tom Green | 1,769 | 39.28 | 559 | 12.41 | 211 | 4.68 | 17 | 0.38 | 117 | 2.60 | 1,309 | 29.06 | 30 | 0.67 | 416 | 9.24 | 76 (Note: Bennet - 1 Booker - 8 Castro - 18 De La Fuente - 3 Delaney - 20 Patrick - 2 Wells - 6 Williamson - 2 Yang - 16) | 1.68 (Note: Bennet - 0.02 Booker - 0.18 Castro - 0.40 De La Fuente - 0.07 Delaney - 0.44 Patrick - 0.04 Wells - 0.13 Williamson - 0.04 Yang - 0.36) | 4,504 | 6.66 |
| Travis | 53,297 | 23.71 | 18,759 | 8.35 | 10,421 | 4.64 | 787 | 0.35 | 5,196 | 2.31 | 84,224 | 37.47 | 801 | 0.36 | 50,012 | 22.25 | 1,249 (Note: Bennet - 125 Booker - 136 Castro - 212 De La Fuente - 40 Delaney - 20 Patrick - 16 Wells - 25 Williamson - 85 Yang - 590) | 0.56 (Note: Bennet - 0.06 Booker - 0.06 Castro - 0.09 De La Fuente - 0.02 Delaney - 0.01 Patrick - 0.01 Wells - 0.01 Williamson - 0.04 Yang - 0.26) | 224,756 | 27.23 |
| Trinity | 260 | 45.45 | 117 | 20.45 | 21 | 3.67 | 0 | 0.00 | 14 | 2.45 | 101 | 17.66 | 10 | 1.75 | 35 | 6.12 | 14 (Note: Bennet - 1 Booker - 1 Castro - 2 Delaney - 3 Wells - 3 Yang - 4) | 2.43 (Note: Bennet - 0.17 Booker - 0.17 Castro - 0.35 Delaney - 0.52 Wells - 0.52 Yang - 0.70) | 572 | 5.11 |
| Tyler | 300 | 47.77 | 131 | 20.86 | 12 | 1.91 | 3 | 0.48 | 15 | 2.39 | 104 | 16.56 | 5 | 0.80 | 42 | 6.69 | 16 (Note: Bennet - 2 Booker - 3 Castro - 1 De La Fuente - 2 Delaney - 1 Wells - 3 Williamson - 2 Yang - 2) | 2.56 (Note: Bennet - 0.32 Booker - 0.48 Castro - 0.16 De La Fuente - 0.32 Delaney - 0.16 Wells - 0.48 Williamson - 0.32 Yang - 0.32) | 628 | 4.47 |
| Upshur | 705 | 53.01 | 180 | 13.53 | 35 | 2.63 | 10 | 0.75 | 22 | 1.45 | 254 | 19.10 | 6 | 0.45 | 72 | 5.41 | 46 (Note: Bennet - 21 Booker - 10 Castro - 1 De La Fuente - 1 Delaney - 4 Patrick - 1 Wells - 5 Williamson - 2 Yang - 1) | 3.48 (Note: Bennet - 1.58 Booker - 0.75 Castro - 0.08 De La Fuente - 0.08 Delaney - 0.30 Patrick - 0.08 Wells - 0.38 Williamson - 0.15 Yang - 0.08) | 1,330 | 4.78 |
| Upton | 19 | 20.21 | 23 | 24.47 | 1 | 1.06 | 0 | 0.00 | 1 | 1.06 | 28 | 29.79 | 2 | 2.13 | 13 | 13.83 | 7 (Note: Booker - 3 Castro - 2 Williamson - 2) | 7.45 (Note: Booker - 3.19 Castro - 2.13 Williamson - 2.13) | 94 | 4.36 |
| Uvalde | 631 | 24.81 | 593 | 23.32 | 88 | 3.46 | 37 | 1.45 | 44 | 1.73 | 633 | 24.89 | 32 | 1.26 | 116 | 4.56 | 369 (Note: Bennet - 17 Booker - 5 Castro - 233 De La Fuente - 46 Delaney - 32 Patrick - 6 Wells - 2 Williamson - 5 Yang - 23) | 14.52 (Note: Bennet - 0.67 Booker - 0.20 Castro - 9.16 De La Fuente - 1.81 Delaney - 1.26 Patrick - 0.24 Wells - 0.08 Williamson - 0.20 Yang - 0.90) | 2,543 | 14.93 |
| Val Verde | 832 | 26.21 | 674 | 21.24 | 101 | 3.18 | 17 | 0.54 | 49 | 1.54 | 856 | 26.97 | 44 | 1.39 | 238 | 7.50 | 363 (Note: Bennet - 18 Booker - 7 Castro - 257 De La Fuente - 42 Delaney - 4 Patrick - 3 Wells - 7 Williamson - 9 Yang - 16) | 11.43 (Note: Bennet - 0.57 Booker - 0.22 Castro - 8.10 De La Fuente - 1.32 Delaney - 0.13 Patrick - 0.09 Wells - 0.22 Williamson - 0.28 Yang - 0.50) | 3,174 | 11.33 |
| Van Zandt | 725 | 47.70 | 261 | 17.17 | 35 | 2.30 | 0 | 0.00 | 26 | 1.71 | 340 | 22.37 | 15 | 0.99 | 101 | 6.64 | 17 (Note: Bennet - 5 Booker - 3 Castro - 2 Delaney - 1 Wells - 2 Williamson - 2 Yang - 2) | 1.12 (Note: Bennet - 0.33 Booker - 0.20 Castro - 0.13 Delaney - 0.07 Wells - 0.13 Williamson - 0.13 Yang - 0.13) | 1,520 | 4.07 |
| Victoria | 1,763 | 44.75 | 461 | 11.70 | 147 | 3.73 | 18 | 0.46 | 84 | 2.13 | 974 | 24.72 | 13 | 0.33 | 359 | 9.11 | 121 (Note: Bennet - 18 Booker - 8 Castro - 50 De La Fuente - 12 Delaney - 6 Patrick - 5 Wells - 3 Williamson - 7 Yang - 12) | 3.07 (Note: Bennet - 0.46 Booker - 0.20 Castro - 1.27 De La Fuente - 0.30 Delaney - 0.15 Patrick - 0.13 Wells - 0.08 Williamson - 0.18 Yang - 0.30) | 3,940 | 7.12 |
| Walker | 1,164 | 43.16 | 347 | 12.87 | 97 | 3.60 | 11 | 0.41 | 47 | 1.74 | 692 | 25.66 | 33 | 1.22 | 269 | 9.97 | 37 (Note: Bennet - 6 Booker - 8 Castro - 3 De La Fuente - 2 Delaney - 5 Wells - 3 Williamson - 2 Yang - 8) | 1.37 (Note: Bennet - 0.22 Booker - 0.30 Castro - 0.11 De La Fuente - 0.07 Delaney - 0.19 Wells - 0.11 Williamson - 0.07 Yang - 0.30) | 2,697 | 7.95 |
| Waller | 1,014 | 38.70 | 346 | 13.21 | 56 | 2.14 | 8 | 0.31 | 32 | 1.22 | 869 | 33.17 | 9 | 0.34 | 195 | 7.44 | 91 (Note: Bennet - 34 Booker - 23 Castro - 13 De La Fuente - 1 Delaney - 2 Patrick - 4 Williamson - 10 Yang - 4) | 3.48 (Note: Bennet - 1.30 Booker - 0.88 Castro - 0.50 De La Fuente - 0.04 Delaney - 0.08 Patrick - 0.15 Williamson - 0.38 Yang - 0.15) | 2,620 | 7.81 |
| Ward | 112 | 28.21 | 111 | 27.96 | 3 | 0.76 | 2 | 0.50 | 4 | 1.01 | 98 | 24.69 | 5 | 1.26 | 24 | 6.05 | 38 (Note: Bennet - 5 Booker - 1 Castro - 16 De La Fuente - 7 Delaney - 1 Patrick - 2 Wells - 3 Williamson - 1 Yang - 2) | 9.56 (Note: Bennet - 1.26 Booker - 0.25 Castro - 4.03 De La Fuente - 1.76 Delaney - 0.25 Patrick - 0.50 Wells - 0.76 Williamson - 0.25 Yang - 0.50) | 397 | 5.94 |
| Washington | 676 | 41.86 | 280 | 17.34 | 91 | 5.63 | 5 | 0.31 | 52 | 3.22 | 323 | 20.00 | 22 | 1.36 | 137 | 8.48 | 29 (Note: Bennet - 3 Booker - 4 Castro - 8 Delaney - 2 Wells - 1 Williamson - 5 Yang - 6) | 1.80 (Note: Bennet - 0.19 Booker - 0.25 Castro - 0.50 Delaney - 0.12 Wells - 0.06 Williamson - 0.31 Yang - 0.37) | 1,615 | 6.91 |
| Webb | 5,372 | 19.93 | 5,903 | 21.90 | 784 | 2.91 | 247 | 0.92 | 364 | 1.35 | 9,446 | 35.05 | 116 | 0.43 | 1,486 | 5.51 | 3,234 (Note: Bennet - 347 Booker - 93 Castro - 1,369 De La Fuente - 839 Delaney - 94 Patrick - 34 Wells - 83 Williamson - 137 Yang - 238) | 12.01 (Note: Bennet - 1.29 Booker - 0.35 Castro - 5.08 De La Fuente - 3.11 Delaney - 0.35 Patrick - 0.13 Wells - 0.31 Williamson - 0.51 Yang - 0.88) | 26,952 | 19.87 |
| Wharton | 612 | 41.32 | 303 | 20.46 | 32 | 2.16 | 1 | 0.07 | 30 | 2.03 | 364 | 24.58 | 18 | 1.22 | 80 | 5.40 | 41 (Note: Bennet - 4 Booker - 5 Castro - 7 De La Fuente - 6 Delaney - 5 Patrick - 1 Wells - 5 Williamson - 2 Yang - 6) | 2.79 (Note: Bennet - 0.27 Booker - 0.34 Castro - 0.47 De La Fuente - 0.41 Delaney - 0.34 Patrick - 0.07 Wells - 0.34 Williamson - 0.14 Yang - 0.41) | 1,481 | 5.90 |
| Wheeler | 31 | 46.27 | 13 | 19.40 | 2 | 2.99 | 1 | 1.49 | 3 | 4.48 | 14 | 20.90 | 0 | 0.00 | 3 | 4.48 | 0 | 0.00 | 67 | 1.96 |
| Wichita | 1,707 | 37.54 | 606 | 13.33 | 244 | 5.37 | 18 | 0.40 | 124 | 2.73 | 1,300 | 28.59 | 30 | 0.66 | 439 | 9.65 | 79 (Note: Bennet - 14 Booker - 6 Castro - 8 De La Fuente - 2 Delaney - 10 Patrick - 1 Wells - 5 Williamson - 7 Yang - 26) | 1.73 (Note: Bennet - 0.31 Booker - 0.13 Castro - 0.18 De La Fuente - 0.04 Delaney - 0.22 Patrick - 0.02 Wells - 0.11 Williamson - 0.15 Yang - 0.57) | 4,547 | 5.59 |
| Wilbarger | 120 | 42.40 | 45 | 15.90 | 14 | 4.95 | 0 | 0.00 | 14 | 4.95 | 59 | 20.85 | 0 | 0.00 | 18 | 6.36 | 13 (Note: Bennet - 1 Castro - 1 Delaney - 7 Wells - 1 Williamson - 2 Yang - 1) | 4.58 (Note: Bennet - 0.35 Castro - 0.35 Delaney - 2.47 Wells - 0.35 Williamson - 0.71 Yang - 0.35) | 283 | 3.41 |
| Willacy | 682 | 22.71 | 684 | 22.78 | 68 | 2.26 | 43 | 1.43 | 67 | 2.23 | 903 | 30.07 | 28 | 0.93 | 134 | 4.46 | 394 (Note: Bennet - 51 Booker - 12 Castro - 113 De La Fuente - 118 Delaney - 11 Patrick - 6 Wells - 15 Williamson - 21 Yang - 47) | 13.13 (Note: Bennet - 1.70 Booker - 0.40 Castro - 3.76 De La Fuente - 3.93 Delaney - 0.37 Patrick - 0.20 Wells - 0.50 Williamson - 0.70 Yang - 1.57) | 3,003 | 23.85 |
| Williamson | 18,198 | 29.87 | 6,852 | 11.25 | 3,376 | 5.54 | 311 | 0.51 | 1,785 | 2.93 | 19,322 | 31.71 | 334 | 0.55 | 10,324 | 16.94 | 431 (Note: Bennet - 36 Booker - 44 Castro - 93 De La Fuente - 17 Delaney - 29 Patrick - 11 Wells - 15 Williamson - 27 Yang - 159) | 0.70 (Note: Bennet - 0.06 Booker - 0.07 Castro - 0.15 De La Fuente - 0.03 Delaney - 0.05 Patrick - 0.02 Wells - 0.02 Williamson - 0.04 Yang - 0.26) | 60,933 | 17.18 |
| Wilson | 848 | 36.54 | 429 | 18.48 | 77 | 3.32 | 6 | 0.26 | 48 | 2.07 | 587 | 25.29 | 25 | 1.08 | 225 | 9.69 | 76 (Note: Bennet - 8 Booker - 2 Castro - 55 De La Fuente - 3 Delaney - 1 Williamson - 2 Yang - 5) | 3.28 (Note: Bennet - 0.34 Booker - 0.09 Castro - 2.37 De La Fuente - 0.13 Delaney - 0.04 Williamson - 0.09 Yang - 0.22) | 2,321 | 6.95 |
| Winkler | 40 | 46.51 | 13 | 15.12 | 2 | 2.33 | 0 | 0.00 | 2 | 2.33 | 17 | 19.77 | 1 | 1.16 | 10 | 11.63 | 1 (Note: Castro - 1) | 1.16 (Note: Castro - 1.16) | 86 | 2.22 |
| Wise | 645 | 35.19 | 335 | 18.28 | 86 | 4.69 | 8 | 0.44 | 52 | 2.84 | 491 | 26.79 | 39 | 2.13 | 155 | 8.46 | 22 (Note: Bennet - 4 Booker - 2 Castro - 3 De La Fuente - 1 Delaney - 2 Wells - 1 Williamson - 6 Yang - 3) | 1.19 (Note: Bennet - 0.22 Booker - 0.11 Castro - 0.16 De La Fuente - 0.05 Delaney - 0.11 Wells - 0.05 Williamson - 0.33 Yang - 0.16) | 1,833 | 4.25 |
| Wood | 753 | 51.22 | 218 | 14.83 | 54 | 3.67 | 3 | 0.20 | 35 | 2.38 | 256 | 17.41 | 6 | 0.41 | 124 | 8.44 | 21 (Note: Bennet - 3 Booker - 4 Castro - 3 Delaney - 1 Wells - 2 Williamson - 1 Yang - 7) | 1.43 (Note: Bennet - 0.20 Booker - 0.27 Castro - 0.20 Delaney - 0.07 Wells - 0.14 Williamson - 0.07 Yang - 0.48) | 1,470 | 4.78 |
| Yoakum | 33 | 37.50 | 16 | 18.18 | 3 | 3.41 | 1 | 1.14 | 0 | 0.00 | 30 | 34.09 | 0 | 0.00 | 4 | 4.55 | 1 (Note: Bennet - 1) | 1.14 (Note: Bennet - 1.14) | 88 | 2.03 |
| Young | 185 | 43.33 | 61 | 14.29 | 21 | 4.92 | 7 | 1.64 | 20 | 4.68 | 82 | 19.20 | 4 | 0.94 | 39 | 9.13 | 8 (Note: Booker - 1 Castro - 2 Yang - 5) | 1.87 (Note: Booker - 0.23 Castro - 0.47 Yang - 1.17) | 427 | 3.66 |
| Zapata | 823 | 26.55 | 677 | 21.84 | 62 | 2.00 | 38 | 1.23 | 60 | 1.94 | 814 | 26.26 | 45 | 1.45 | 134 | 4.32 | 447 (Note: Bennet - 39 Booker - 11 Castro - 114 De La Fuente - 160 Delaney - 18 Patrick - 15 Wells - 25 Williamson - 23 Yang - 42) | 14.41 (Note: Bennet - 1.26 Booker - 0.35 Castro - 3.68 De La Fuente - 5.16 Delaney - 0.58 Patrick - 0.48 Wells - 0.81 Williamson - 0.74 Yang - 1.35) | 3,100 | 39.04 |
| Zavala | 721 | 26.13 | 706 | 25.59 | 40 | 1.45 | 16 | 0.58 | 28 | 1.01 | 779 | 28.23 | 25 | 0.91 | 86 | 3.12 | 358 (Note: Bennet - 40 Booker - 14 Castro - 168 De La Fuente - 82 Delaney - 20 Patrick - 3 Wells - 7 Williamson - 10 Yang - 14) | 12.97 (Note: Bennet - 1.45 Booker - 0.51 Castro - 6.09 De La Fuente - 2.97 Delaney - 0.72 Patrick - 0.11 Wells - 0.25 Williamson - 0.36 Yang - 0.51) | 2,759 | 34.15 |

== Analysis ==
Exit polls indicated Sanders winning an overwhelming share of the Latino vote, exemplifying his strong efforts at outreach to Texas's Latino community carrying with that almost every counties in the Mexican–American border as well as cities like El Paso, San Antonio and Austin. He also won the voters under 50 of all races. Biden's strength was overwhelmingly among older people, especially whites and African-Americans in cities such as Dallas and Houston.

== See also ==
- 2020 Texas Republican presidential primary

== Notes ==
Additional candidates

General

Withdrawn candidates votes by county

Withdrawn candidates percentages by county
