= Monte Lee (American football) =

American football player (1938–)

- Lee, circa 1962

No. 33, 52, 67
- Position: Linebacker

Personal information
- Born: July 11, 1938; Ballinger, Texas, U.S.
- Died: August 24, 2021 (aged 83); Texas, U.S.
- Listed height: 6 ft 4 in (1.93 m)
- Listed weight: 225 lb (102 kg)

Career information
- High school: Hale Center (Hale Center, Texas)
- College: Texas
- NFL draft: 1960: 8th round, 92nd overall pick

Career history
- Philadelphia Eagles (1961)*; St. Louis Cardinals (1961); Detroit Lions (1963–1964); Mobile Tarpons (1965); Baltimore Colts (1965); Atlanta Falcons (1966)*
- * Offseason or practice squad member only

Awards and highlights
- 2× First-team All-Southwest (1959, 1960)
- Stats at Pro Football Reference

Monte Vern Lee (July 11, 1938 – August 24, 2021) was an American professional football linebacker who played in the National Football League (NFL) with the St. Louis Cardinals, Detroit Lions, and Baltimore Colts. He played college football for the Texas Longhorns and was selected by the Philadelphia Eagles in the eighth round of the 1960 NFL draft.

== Early life ==
Monte Vern Lee was born on July 11, 1938, in Ballinger, Texas. He attended Hale Center High School in Hale Center, Texas.

== College career ==
Lee enrolled at The University of Texas to play college football for the Longhorns. He sat out the 1956 season as a freshman. He became a starter at end for the Longhorns on October 12, 1957, against the Oklahoma Sooners. Lee was redshirted in 1958 due to injury. He returned to action in 1959, earning Associated Press (AP) and United Press (UP) first-team All-Southwest Conference honors at end. As a senior in 1960, he garnered AP and UP first-team All-Southwest Conference recognition at guard while also serving as a linebacker on defense. Overall, Lee was a varsity letterman in 1957, 1959, and 1960. He caught six career passes for 119 yards and one touchdown. He was the first player in school history to be a team captain for two years. Lee was inducted into the school's athletics hall of fame in 2005.

== Professional career ==
Lee was selected by the Philadelphia Eagles in the eighth round, with the 92nd overall pick, of the 1960 NFL draft and by the Houston Oilers in the fifth round, with the 40th overall pick, of the 1961 AFL draft. At the conclusion of his college career, he signed with the Eagles on January 26, 1961. He was released on September 12, 1961, before the start of the 1961 season.

On September 18, 1961, it was reported that Lee had been signed by the St. Louis Cardinals. He played in 12 games, starting one, for the Cardinals in 1961, recording one interception for seven yards and one kick return for 12 yards. He missed the 1962 season while serving in the United States Army.

Lee signed with the Detroit Lions on October 25, 1963. He appeared in eight games as a reserve linebacker during the 1963 season. In 1964, he played in all 14 games, starting one, and returned one kick for 25 yards. Lee was waived by the Lions on September 15, 1965.

On September 22, 1965, Lee signed a futures contract with the expansion Atlanta Falcons for their inaugural 1966 season. He then played for the Mobile Tarpons of the North American Football League (NAFL) during the 1965 season, earning All-NAFL honors. On November 11, 1965, after Don Shinnick suffered a broken arm, the Baltimore Colts purchased Lee's contract from the Tarpons. He played in five games for the Colts as a backup linebacker before being released on December 15, 1965. In 1966, Lee's previously signed futures contract with the Falcons went into effect. He was released by Atlanta on August 11, 1966, after the second preseason game.

== Personal life ==
Lee coached six-man football at Cotton Center High School. He was later the superintendent of the Olton Independent School District. He died on August 24, 2021.
