= Seth Ward =

Seth Ward may refer to:

- Seth Ward, Texas, an unincorporated community
  - Jimmy Dean (1928–2010), entertainer, mistakenly identified with the birth name of Seth Ward, which was actually the above town in Texas where he grew up
- Seth Ward (bishop of Salisbury) (1617–1689), English astronomer and mathematician, and the Bishop of Exeter and Salisbury
- Seth Ward (priest) (1645–1690), English clergyman, Archdeacon of Wilts
- Seth Ward (businessman) (1820–1903), parlayed an Oregon Trail supply business into large Kansas City real estate holdings including the Country Club Plaza and for whom Ward Parkway is named
- Seth Ward (Methodist bishop) (1858–1909), American bishop of the Methodist Episcopal Church, South
- Seth Ward (Whitewater), Arkansas businessman
