= Ken King (politician) =

Texas state legislator and businessman

Member of the Texas House of Representatives from the 88th district
- Incumbent
- Assumed office January 8, 2013
- Preceded by: Jim Landtroop (redistricted)

Personal details
- Born: Kenneth Paul King; December 28, 1971 (age 54) Canadian, Texas, U.S.
- Party: Republican
- Spouse: Robin Renell King
- Occupation: Businessman

Kenneth Paul King (born December 28, 1971) is an American businessman and politician. He is a Republican member of the Texas House of Representatives from District 88 in the Texas Panhandle. King is a businessman engaged in the oil and natural gas industry.

== Career ==
=== Politics ===
On July 31, 2012, King defeated first-term incumbent Republican Jim Landtroop, an insurance agent from Plainview, in a runoff election. King received 7,541 votes (54 percent) to Landtroop's 6,426 ballots (46 percent). The runoff was required because of the unsuccessful candidacy of a third candidate, former State Representative Gary Walker.

King serves on the Judiciary & Civil Jurisprudence and Public Education committees. He was elected to his second term in office on November 4, 2014, with a margin of 91.2 percent over a Libertarian opponent.

In 2016, King was unopposed in both the primary and general elections.

According to a report by conservative activist Luke Macias, during the 89th Texas Legislature, Ken King killed over 100 conservative bills as chairman of the State Affairs committee. Macias highlighted several, including bills to ban taxpayer-funded lobbying and enact mandatory e-verify that had both passed the Texas Senate.

=== Ratings ===
Empower Texans/Texans for Fiscal Responsibility gave King a rating of 56% in 2015 and 39% in 2013. The National Rifle Association of America gave King a score of 93% in 2016 and a score of 86% in 2012. In 2015 the American Conservative Union gave King a lifetime score of 60%. Additionally, the Young Conservatives of Texas gave King a score of 37% in 2015 and 50% in 2013.

== Personal life ==
King resides with his wife, Robin Renell King, in his native Canadian, Texas, the county seat of Hemphill County. The son of Willard L. and Paulette King, he is United Methodist.

Texas House of Representatives
Preceded by Jim Landtroop	Texas State Representative from District 88 (Panhandle and South Plains); 2013–	Succeeded by Incumbent in reconfigured district
