= National Register of Historic Places listings in Hale County, Texas =

Location of Hale County in Texas

This is a list of the National Register of Historic Places listings in Hale County, Texas.

This is intended to be a complete list of properties and districts listed on the National Register of Historic Places in Hale County, Texas. There are one National Historic Landmark and one district listed on the National Register in the county. The district includes one Recorded Texas Historic Landmark.

This National Park Service list is complete through NPS recent listings posted March 21, 2025.

== Current listings ==
The publicly disclosed locations of National Register properties and districts may be seen in a mapping service provided.

	Name on the Register	Image	Date listed	Location	City or town	Description
1	Plainview Commercial Historic District	Plainview Commercial Historic District	December 2, 1982 (#82004855)	Roughly bounded by E. 4th, Austin, E. 9th, and Ash Sts. (both sides); 34°11′08″N 101°42′11″W	Plainview	Includes one Recorded Texas Historic Landmark
2	Plainview Site	Plainview Site	October 15, 1966 (#66000814)	Address restricted	Plainview	

== See also ==
- National Register of Historic Places listings in Texas
- Recorded Texas Historic Landmarks in Hale County
