= Plainview High School =

Plainview High School may refer to:

- Plainview High School in Rainsville, Alabama
- Plainview High School in Plainview, Minnesota
- Plainview High School in Plainview, Nebraska
- Plainview High School in Ardmore, Oklahoma
- Plainview High School (Texas) in Plainview, Texas
