= Abernathy, Texas =

- City
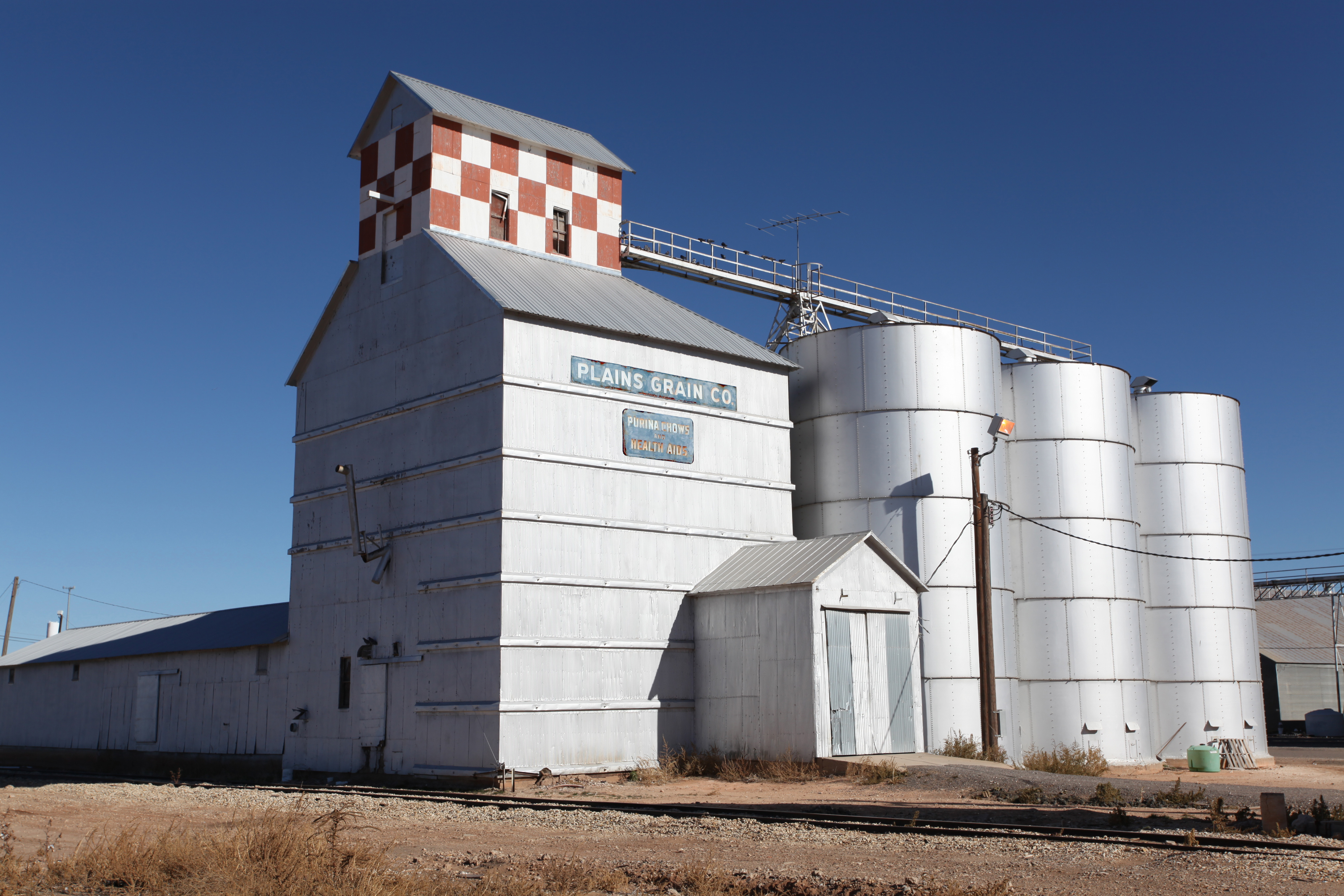
- Plains Grain Company elevator near the tracks
- Interactive map of Abernathy, Texas
- Location of Abernathy in Texas
- Coordinates: 33°49′56″N 101°50′35″W
- Country: United States
- State: Texas
- Counties: Lubbock and Hale
- Region: Llano Estacado
- Established: 1909

Area
  - Total: 3.21 sq mi (8.31 km^{2})
  - Land: 3.20 sq mi (8.29 km^{2})
  - Water: 0.0039 sq mi (0.01 km^{2})
- Elevation: 3,360 ft (1,020 m)

Population (2020)
  - Total: 2,865
  - Estimate (2021): 2,804
  - Density: 845.0/sq mi (326.26/km^{2})
- Time zone: UTC-6 (CST)
- ZIP code: 79311
- Area code: 806
- FIPS code: 48-00160
- Website: cityofabernathy.org

Abernathy is a city in Hale and Lubbock Counties in the U.S. state of Texas. As of the 2020 census, Abernathy had a population of 2,865.

The Hale County portion of Abernathy is part of the Plainview micropolitan statistical area, while the Lubbock County portion is part of the Lubbock metropolitan area.

== History ==
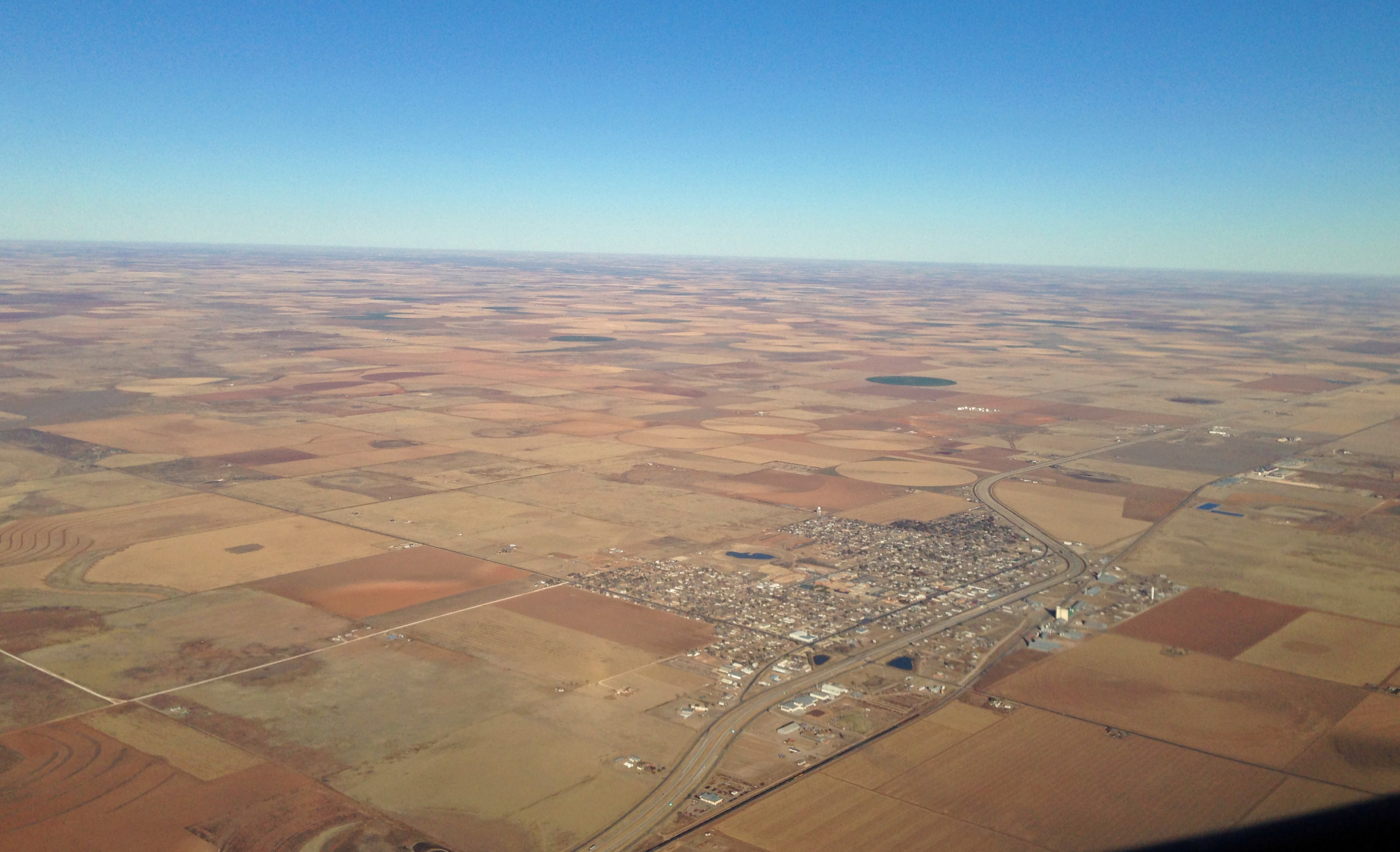
Abernathy from above

The Santa Fe Railroad wanted to follow a straight line from Plainview to Lubbock. A straight-line survey was run, and it went east of the present site of Abernathy. This route did not please the residents of Hale Center, which had been established since the 1890s. They influenced the Santa Fe to come southwest out of Plainview to serve them, and from there the Santa Fe followed an approximate straight line into Lubbock.

The developers of the town sites along the new railroad wanted to organize a town on a section 4 miles (6 km) north of the present town of Abernathy. The owners, who lived in Wisconsin, were contacted. They thought gold might be on the land and refused to sell. Therefore, the last section south in Hale County was chosen as the town site.

Originally owned by John Y. Ligon, the section that was to become the Abernathy town site was purchased by J.C. Roberds from E.S. and W.L. Stanfield. When the South Plains Investment Company was formed by Roberds, Dr. M.C. Overton, and Monroe Abernathy, Mr. Roberds deeded the section to the firm and became the president of the firm. Dr. Overton was secretary and Mr. Abernathy was treasurer.

On June 18, 1909, the official survey of the town site was recognized by Gov. T.M. Campbell. The town site was platted on July 8, 1909, and was named for M.C. Abernathy. Mr. Monk was the resident agent for the company, and a small frame office building was built. Lots and blocks were sold from there.

Since several buildings were already in Bartonsite and none in Abernathy, the founding fathers here contracted with J.J. Barton to move some of the buildings to Abernathy. In the late summer of 1909, the move began. Buildings were placed on rollers. The latest equipment, steam-driven tractors, were hooked on. The exodus began to huff and puff toward the new town. The tractors did not move but about three or four miles per hour, so it was a long trip. A two-story yellow hotel, a lumberyard, a blacksmith shop, and three or four residences were some of the roughly 10 buildings moved.

The first train came to Abernathy in the early fall of 1909. This was not a regular train, but some cars added to the work train. The depot was constructed in 1909. C.E. Stout was the first local agent for the Santa Fe.

The section where the town of Abernathy was being developed was fenced, and gates had to be opened when entering and leaving town. The streets and block corners were laid off with lumber stubs, which denoted streets for the next few years, until a grader finally came in to run ditches.

Town residents had free range on the section, and their milk cows and horses and mules were turned loose to graze. The stock would stray out of the section, and range cattle would come into town, when someone happened to leave the gates open. The ladies had to stand guard at their clotheslines to keep the livestock from ruining their laundry. When a load of feed was brought to town, the cattle and horses had to be chased away until it was unloaded in stack lots or barns. Trains running through the town section frequently hit the livestock.

Behind most of the houses were outhouses, barns, and windmills. Nearly every home had its own windmill, although a few families hauled water. Generally, gardens and cow lots were integral parts of each household.

Although the City of Abernathy was founded in 1909, it was not incorporated until 1924. An election was called for September 12, 1924. The first mayor was F.W. Struve, and aldermen elected were R.M. Hardesty, N.C. Hix, Sam W. Smith, T.B. Stone, and E.B. Lindsey.

== Geography ==
Most of the city is located in Hale County; roughly 25% of the city extends southward into Lubbock County.

According to the United States Census Bureau, the city has a total area of 1.2 square miles (3.2 km^{2}), all land.

=== Climate ===
Climate data for Abernathy, Texas
Month	Jan	Feb	Mar	Apr	May	Jun	Jul	Aug	Sep	Oct	Nov	Dec	Year
Mean daily maximum °F (°C)	55.1 (12.8)	57.2 (14.0)	65.0 (18.3)	72.4 (22.4)	81.3 (27.4)	89.1 (31.7)	88.7 (31.5)	89.5 (31.9)	82.9 (28.3)	73.9 (23.3)	63.7 (17.6)	55.3 (12.9)	72.9 (22.7)
Mean daily minimum °F (°C)	24.2 (−4.3)	26.3 (−3.2)	34.0 (1.1)	41.4 (5.2)	52.1 (11.2)	62.7 (17.1)	64.8 (18.2)	64.6 (18.1)	57.4 (14.1)	44.8 (7.1)	32.4 (0.2)	24.3 (−4.3)	44.1 (6.7)
Average precipitation inches (mm)	0.6 (15)	0.7 (18)	0.9 (23)	1.2 (30)	2.5 (64)	2.9 (74)	2.4 (61)	2.3 (58)	2.5 (64)	1.8 (46)	0.8 (20)	0.7 (18)	19.4 (490)
Source: Weatherbase

== Demographics ==
Historical population
Census	Pop.	Note	%±
1930	858		—
1940	847		−1.3%
1950	1,692		99.8%
1960	2,491		47.2%
1970	2,625		5.4%
1980	2,904		10.6%
1990	2,720		−6.3%
2000	2,839		4.4%
2010	2,805		−1.2%
2020	2,865		2.1%
2021 (est.)	2,804		−2.1%
1930-2000

=== 2020 census ===
As of the 2020 census, Abernathy had a population of 2,865. The median age was 37.1 years. 28.0% of residents were under the age of 18 and 16.8% of residents were 65 years of age or older. For every 100 females there were 94.0 males, and for every 100 females age 18 and over there were 92.4 males age 18 and over. There were 865 families residing in the city.

0% of residents lived in urban areas, while 100.0% lived in rural areas.

There were 1,050 households in Abernathy, of which 39.1% had children under the age of 18 living in them. Of all households, 52.7% were married-couple households, 16.8% were households with a male householder and no spouse or partner present, and 25.2% were households with a female householder and no spouse or partner present. About 22.6% of all households were made up of individuals and 11.9% had someone living alone who was 65 years of age or older.

There were 1,178 housing units, of which 10.9% were vacant. Among occupied housing units, 73.6% were owner-occupied and 26.4% were renter-occupied. The homeowner vacancy rate was 2.0% and the rental vacancy rate was 8.3%.

Racial composition as of the 2020 census
Race	Percent
White	61.9%
Black or African American	2.4%
American Indian and Alaska Native	0.7%
Asian	0.2%
Native Hawaiian and Other Pacific Islander	0%
Some other race	15.7%
Two or more races	19.0%
Hispanic or Latino (of any race)	49.2%

=== 2000 census ===
As of the 2000 census, 2,839 people, 996 households, and 800 families resided in the city. The population density was 2,402.0 inhabitants per square mile (927.4/km^{2}). The 1,081 housing units had an average density of 914.6 per square mile (353.1/km^{2}). The racial makeup of the city was 76.15% White, 2.47% African American, 0.77% Native American, 0.14% Asian, 18.63% from other races, and 1.83% from two or more races. Hispanics or Latinos of any race were 43.15% of the population.

Of the 996 households, 38.8% had children under 18 living with them, 65.5% were married couples living together, 10.9% had a female householder with no husband present, and 19.6% were not families. About 18.2% of all households were made up of individuals, and 11.5% had someone living alone who was 65 or older. The average household size was 2.85 and the average family size was 3.23.

In the city, the population was distributed as 30.1% under the age of 18, 8.0% from 18 to 24, 25.5% from 25 to 44, 21.4% from 45 to 64, and 15.1% who were 65 years of age or older. The median age was 35 years. For every 100 females, there were 95.9 males. For every 100 females age 18 and over, there were 88.5 males.

The median income for a household in the city was $31,377, and for a family was $35,399. Males had a median income of $25,635 versus $21,198 for females. The per capita income for the city was $13,919. About 9.6% of families and 9.3% of the population were below the poverty line, including 8.3% of those under age 18 and 9.4% of those age 65 or over.

== Education ==
The Abernathy Independent School District has an elementary school, middle school, and high school, with a district-wide enrollment of 768 students in 2009, and 812 for the 2025-6 school year.

== See also ==
- Abernathy Advocate newspaper
- Llano Estacado
- BNSF Railway
