= KRIA (FM) =

- Plainview, Texas; United States
- Frequency: 103.9 MHz
- Branding: 103.9 The Pulse

Programming
- Format: Hot adult contemporary

Ownership
- Owner: Monty Spearman and Gentry Todd Spearman; (High Plains Radio Network, LLC LMA with RAMAR Communications of Lubbock)
- Sister stations: KKYN-FM, KREW, KVOP

History
- First air date: 1988 (as KKYN-FM)
- Former call signs: KPMB (1986–1988, CP); KKYN-FM (1988–2002); KVOP-FM (7/2002-9/2002)

Technical information
- Licensing authority: FCC
- Facility ID: 54682
- Class: C2
- ERP: 25,000 watts
- HAAT: 112 meters (367 feet)
- Transmitter coordinates: 34°15′47.30″N 101°40′31.60″W

Links
- Public license information: Public file; LMS
- Website: www.hpr.network/texas

KRIA (103.9 FM, "The Pulse") is a hot adult contemporary formatted radio station licensed to serve Plainview, Texas. The station is owned by Monty Spearman and Gentry Todd Spearman, through High Plains Radio Network, LLC. There is an LMA with RAMAR Communications of Lubbock to re-broadcast Magic 106.5 KXTQ from Lubbock.

== History ==
The station used the call sign KPMB from 1986 to 1988, KKYN-FM from 1988 to 2002, KVOP-FM for two months in 2002, before becoming KRIA on September 16, 2002.

The station was owned by Equicom until a 2004 sale of 12 Texas radio stations to Rhattigan Broadcasting for a reported total of $3 million.

KRIA-FM is part of High Plains Radio's Plainview cluster of radio stations, which includes KKYN-FM (106.9 FM), KVOP (1090 AM) and KREW (1400 AM). High Plains Radio purchased the stations from Rhattigan Broadcasting effective March 2, 2015, at a price of $450,000.

On July 19, 2017 KRIA changed format from tejano to hot adult contemporary, branded as "The Pulse". (info taken from stationintel.com)
