= Michael Egnew =

American football player (born 1989)

No. 84
- Position: Tight end

Personal information
- Born: November 1, 1989 (age 37); Lubbock, Texas, U.S.
- Listed height: 6 ft 5 in (1.96 m)
- Listed weight: 252 lb (114 kg)

Career information
- High school: Plainview (Plainview, Texas)
- College: Missouri (2008–2011)
- NFL draft: 2012: 3rd round, 78th overall pick

Career history
- Miami Dolphins (2012–2013); Detroit Lions (2014)*; Jacksonville Jaguars (2014)*; Pittsburgh Steelers (2015)*; New Orleans Saints (2015)*
- * Offseason or practice squad member only

Awards and highlights
- Ozzie Newsome Award (2010); Consensus All-American (2010); 2× First-team All-Big 12 (2010, 2011)

Career NFL statistics
- Receptions: 7
- Receiving yards: 69
- Stats at Pro Football Reference

Michael Egnew (born November 1, 1989) is an American former professional football player who was a tight end for the Miami Dolphins of the National Football League (NFL). He played college football for the Missouri Tigers, earning consensus All-American honors in 2010. He was selected by Miami in the third round of the 2012 NFL draft.

== Early life ==
Egnew was born in Lubbock, Texas. He attended Plainview High School, and was a standout tight end for the Plainview Bulldogs high school football team. He was also a member of the Bulldogs basketball and track and field teams, and placed first in the state track championships in the long jump.

== College career ==
Egnew attended the University of Missouri, where he played for coach Gary Pinkel's Missouri Tigers football team from 2008 to 2011. He was a finalist for the John Mackey Award in 2010. Following his junior season in 2010, Egnew was named a first-team All-Big 12 selection and was recognized as a consensus first-team All-American. As a senior in 2011, he was named a first-team All-Big 12 selection for the second consecutive year.

== Professional career ==
Pre-draft measurables
| Height | Weight | 40-yard dash | 20-yard shuttle | Three-cone drill | Vertical jump | Broad jump | Bench press |
|---|---|---|---|---|---|---|---|
| 6 ft 5 in (1.96 m) | 252 lb (114 kg) | 4.54 s | 4.32 s | 7.03 s | 38 1/2 in (0.98 m) | 11.4 ft 4 in (3.58 m) | 21 reps |
Broad jump and vertical from Mizzou Pro Day, other values from NFL Combine

Regarded as one of the best tight ends in the 2012 NFL draft, Egnew was selected in the third round (78th pick overall) by the Miami Dolphins. He was the third tight end chosen in the 2012 draft.

On July 26, 2012, Egnew signed a four-year contract with the Miami Dolphins. On August 22, 2014, Egnew was released.

On August 25, 2014, Egnew was picked up off waivers by the Detroit Lions. He was waived on August 30, 2014.

On September 9, 2014, he was signed to the Jacksonville Jaguars practice squad. He was released from the practice squad on September 24.

== Personal life ==
Michael Egnew was chosen to be the head coach for Father Tolton Regional Catholic High School in Columbia Missouri starting in the 2019-2020 season. He was previously an assistant coach at the same school for four seasons.
