= Plainview Commercial Historic District =

Area in Plainview, Texas, USA

- U.S. National Register of Historic Places
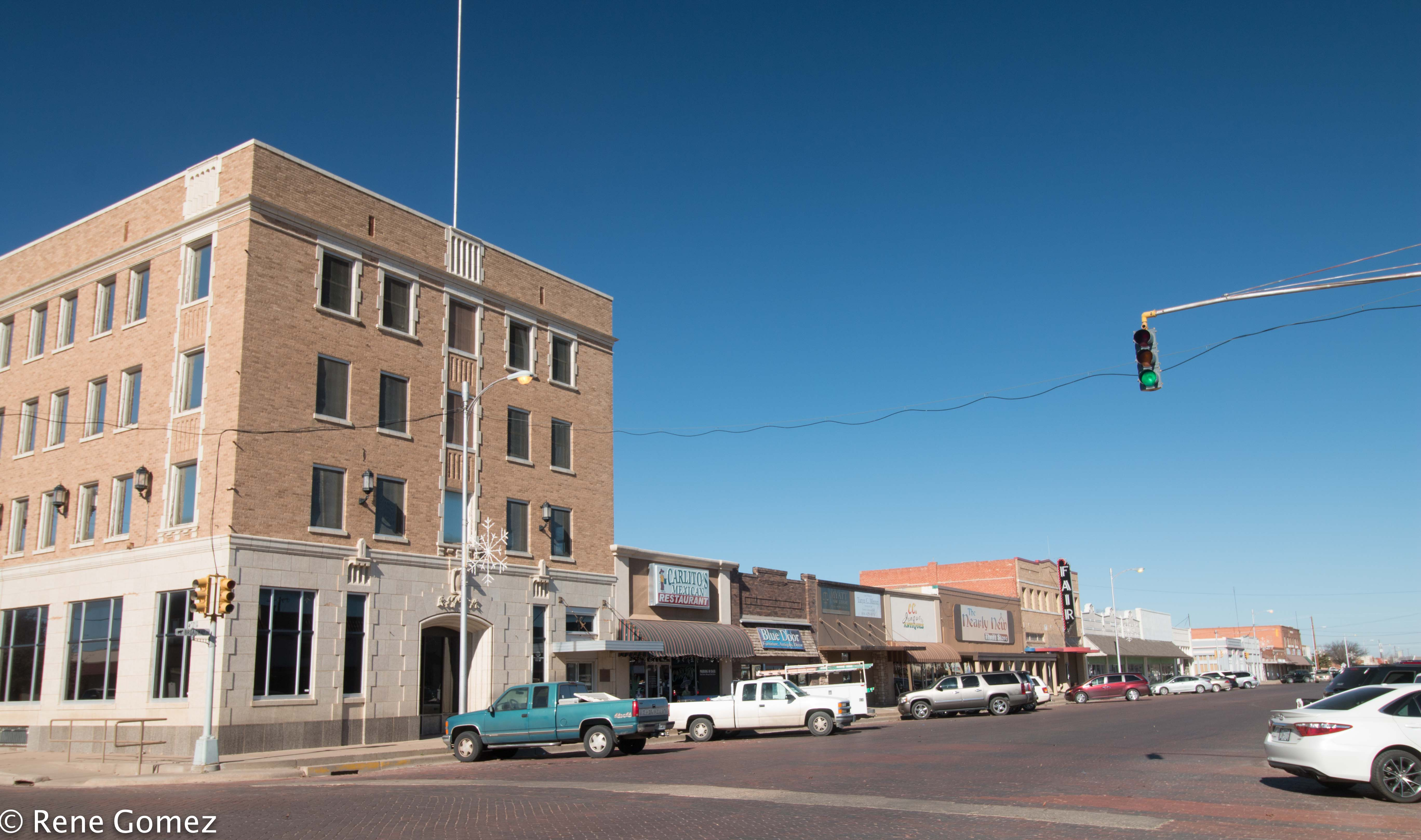

- Location within Texas Location within the United States
- Location: Roughly bounded by E. 4th, Austin, E. 9th, and Ash Sts. (both sides), Plainview, Texas
- Coordinates: 34.185556°N 101.703056°W
- Area: 40 acres (16 ha)
- Built: 1910
- Architectural style: Classical Revival, Moderne
- NRHP reference No.: 82004855
- Added to NRHP: December 2, 1982

The Plainview Commercial Historic District is a historic district listed on the National Register of Historic Places in 1982 in Plainview, Texas. In Hale County, Texas in the High Plains region of Texas, it is roughly bounded by East 4th, Austin, East 9th, and Ash Streets. The district includes at least one Recorded Texas Historic Landmark.

The district has buildings dated to 1909 and 1910, and includes Classical Revival and Moderne architecture. Buildings included were categorized as government; Recreation And Culture; and Commerce/trade with "Historic subfunction": Professional; Theater; Financial Institution; and Business. The listing included 82 contributing buildings on 40 acres (16 ha). In 2012, buildings were described as follows:

The former First National Bank (1909) at 601 Broadway is distinguished from its numerous counterparts by the light-courts at the second-floor office level on the building’s long side along W. 6th Street. Ornamental brickwork includes a stepped cornice, piers, and pilasters. The ground floor has been modified for retail space. The four-story Skaggs Building (1928) at 703 Broadway, a reinforced concrete-framed office building, has a granite base, a first story faced in white terra-cotta, and upper walls of a tawny brick, with stone trim. It was designed by Amarillo-based Kerr and Walsh, as was the former Plainview Herald Building (now offices for Harvest Christian Fellowship) of 1925 at 801 Broadway. The institutional rather than commercial character of this office testifies to the rising cultural aspirations of Plainview in the 1920s. The one-story brick building is richly detailed with paired pilasters at the outer corners and pilasters framing the arched entrance. The recessed glazing between the pilasters gives the impression of an open pavilion.

== See also ==
- Plainview Site
