= KKYN-FM =

- Plainview, Texas; United States
- Frequency: 106.9 MHz
- Branding: Kickin' Kountry

Programming
- Format: Country

Ownership
- Owner: Monte Spearman and Gentry Todd Spearman; (High Plains Radio Network, LLC)
- Sister stations: KRIA, KREW, KVOP

History
- First air date: July 28, 1995 (as KHDY)
- Former call signs: KHDY (1995–1999); KVOP-FM (1999–2002)

Technical information
- Licensing authority: FCC
- Facility ID: 57462
- Class: C2
- ERP: 50,000 watts
- HAAT: 143 meters (469 feet)
- Transmitter coordinates: 34°15′47.3″N 101°40′31.6″W

Links
- Public license information: Public file; LMS
- Website: www.hpr.network/texas

KKYN-FM is a radio station licensed to Plainview, Texas, broadcasting on 106.9 MHz. The station airs a country music format, and is owned by Monte Spearman and Gentry Todd Spearman, through licensee High Plains Radio Network, LLC.
