= Cotton Center, Texas =

- Unincorporated community
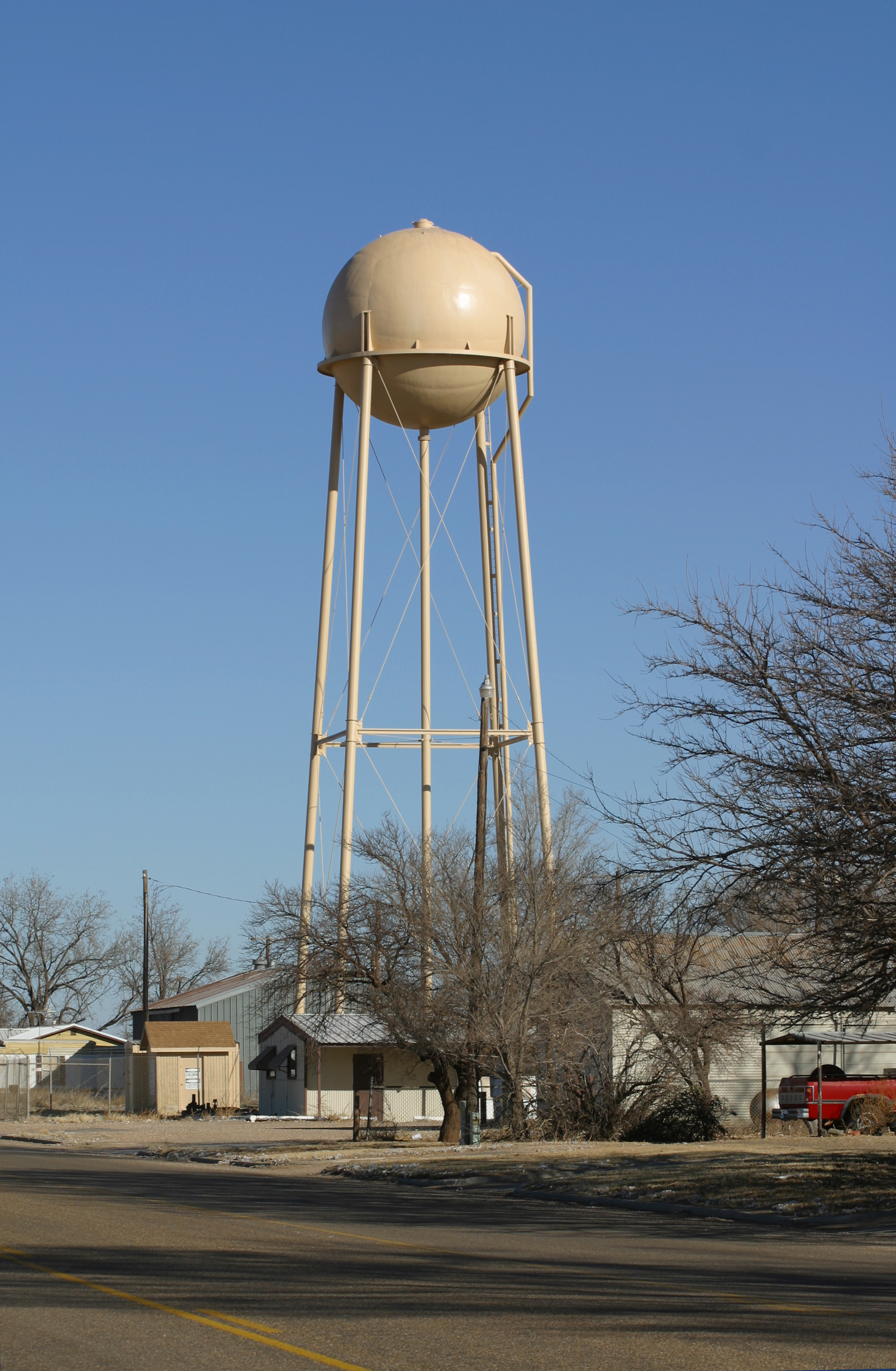

- Location within Texas Location within the United States
- Coordinates: 33°59′35″N 101°59′35″W
- Country: United States
- State: Texas
- County: Hale
- Region: Llano Estacado
- Established: 1925
- Elevation: 3,474 ft (1,059 m)

Population (2000)
  - Total: 174
- Time zone: UTC-6 (CST)
- ZIP code: 79021
- Area code: 806
- Website: Handbook of Texas

Cotton Center is an unincorporated community in western Hale County, Texas, United States, located about 12 miles southwest of Hale Center. Until the late 19th century, the Comanche tribe of Native Americans occupied the area. In 1907, with the coming of a branch of the Santa Fe Railroad, a number of farming operations were established. Cotton Center was originally created in 1925 as a consolidated school district, with a small unincorporated community site, containing the school, cotton gins, and various businesses to support the surrounding farms. In 1935, a local post office opened, and the first irrigation well was drilled. By the late 1940s, irrigation wells proliferated, pumping water from the Ogallala Aquifer. The community revolves around farming and is tied together by the school, which as of 2005 had 140 students in prekindergarten through grade 12.

== Education ==
The community of Cotton Center is served by the Cotton Center Independent School District and home to the Cotton Center High School Elks.

== See also ==
- Spade Ranch (Texas)
- Llano Estacado
- Blackwater Draw
- Yellow House Draw
