= Bob Bryant (end) =

American football player (1937–1999)

No. 89
- Position: End

Personal information
- Born: May 19, 1937; United States
- Died: June 29, 1999 (aged 62); Bastrop, Texas, U.S.
- Listed height: 6 ft 5 in (1.96 m)
- Listed weight: 230 lb (104 kg)

Career information
- High school: Plainview (Plainview, Texas)
- College: Texas (1955–1958)

Career history
- Toronto Argonauts (1959)*; Dallas Texans (1960)
- * Offseason or practice squad member only

Awards and highlights
- 2× Second-team All-SWC (1956, 1958)
- Stats at Pro Football Reference

Robert Earl Bryant (May 19, 1937 – June 29, 1999) was an American professional football end who played one season in the American Football League (AFL) with the Dallas Texans. He played college football at the University of Texas.

== Early life and college ==
Robert Earl Bryant was born on May 19, 1937. He attended Plainview High School in Plainview, Texas.

He was a member of the Texas Longhorns football team from 1955 to 1958 and a three-year letterman from 1956 to 1958. He caught 24 passes for a team-high 301 yards and four touchdowns in 1956, earning United Press International (UPI) second-team All-Southwest Conference (SWC) honors and leading the SWC in receptions that season. l He recorded eight receptions for 134 yards in 1957 and helped the team to the 1958 Sugar Bowl and a #11 ranking in Darrell Royal's first season.

In 1958 Bryant, then a team captain in his senior year, led the team in receiving yards again, catching 14 passes for 233 yards and two touchdowns, garnering Associated Press and UPI second-team All-SWC recognition again. That year he was named the team's MVP.

== Professional career ==
Coming out of college, Bryant was signed by the Toronto Argonauts in 1959, but was cut before the first exhibition game.

Bryant was later signed by the Dallas Texans (now Kansas City Chiefs) of the American Football League on June 18, 1960. He played in ten games for the Texans during the team's inaugural season in 1960, catching five passes for 43 yards. He became a free agent in May of 1961 but never signed on with another team.

== Death ==
Bryant died in Bastrop, Texas on June 29, 1999, at the age of 62.
