= South Dakota Open and Clean Government Act =

The South Dakota Open and Clean Government Act, or Initiated Measure 10, was a South Dakota initiative that would ban taxpayer-funded lobbying, stop the exchange of campaign donations for state contracts, and open a website with information on state contracts. The Open and Clean Government Act was proposed as a citizen-initiated state statute and appeared on the November 4, 2008 ballot.

== 2008 election results ==
Results by county: No: 50–60%; 60–70%; 70–80%

These results are based on the Elections Division of South Dakota.

Open and Clean Government
Yes or no	Votes	Percentage
Yes	127,042	35.3%
No	232,631	64.7%
Total votes	359,673	100%

== Petition Drive Management Company ==
National Ballot Access was the signature vendor for this petition drive.

== Specific provisions ==
The text of the initiative reads:

No public body, public officer, person in the employ of the state or any of its political subdivisions, or candidate for public office may, directly or indirectly, direct, permit, receive, require, or facilitate the use of tax revenues or any other public resources for campaign, lobbying, or partisan purposes, including payment of dues or membership fees of any kind to any person, league, or association which, directly or indirectly engages in lobbying, campaigns or partisan activity.

Anyone who would violate the law would be charged with a misdemeanor.

== Arguments ==
=== Pro ===
- The measure would reduce or eliminate trading government contracts for campaign contributions.
- It would put an end to "taxpayer-funded lobbying", that is, the practice of organizations supported by tax dollars lobbying for more taxes.
- The measure requires a website be made available so that anyone can search through and review state contracts.
- The opposition Yes on 10 has made many claims about Initiated Measure 10. Among these claims is that this law applies to employment contracts and individual employees. A read of the measure shows that Section 10(2) limits the effect of the law references by these criticisms to only contracts over $500 and completely exempts employment contracts:
  - "(2) "Government contract," includes any contract awarded by an agency or department of this state or any public body receiving state subsidy or authorized to levy taxes, for the purchase of goods or services for amounts greater than five hundred dollars, indexed for inflation per the Consumer Price Index after the year 2010. A contract for services includes collective bargaining agreements with a labor organization representing employees but not employment contracts with individual employees;"
  - Section 10(3) defines who is a "Holder of a government contract" - the only people whose ability to donate is restricted by accepting a government contract, under the Open and Clean Government Act:
  - (3) "Holder of the government contract," includes any party to the contract, including partners, owners of five percent or more interest, officers, administrators or trustees of any person who is a party to the contract, or, in the case of collective bargaining agreements, the labor organization and any political committees created or controlled by the labor organization;
  - While it is true that family members of holders of a government contract cannot give campaign contributions to the elected official ultimately responsible for the award of that contract, proponents of Initiated Measure 10 argue that this is a common sense step to close a gaping loophole that otherwise would allow contractors to contributions through their family members. It also protects the family members from being pressured by politicians to make campaign donations to ensure the continuation of their family member's government contract. Additionally, in the case of a special no-bid contracts, employees CAN give donations to any candidate they wish, but they cannot be used as a conduit through which the holders of that contract (the company's owners) pass money through them to the political candidates.

=== Con ===
- The measure is not clear.
- It goes too far in limiting political contributions from holders of no-bid governmental contracts.
- South Dakota already provides a website showing government spending.
- Since anyone could file a complaint with the Attorney General if they believe the measure's provisions have been violated, the courts might get bogged down.

== Support ==
South Dakotans for Open and Clean Government sponsored the initiative and formed as a Ballot Question Committee (BQC) to promote the issue.

The committee believed that the initiative would have made government contracts more accessible and apply stiffer regulations that would protect taxpayers. Tonchi Weaver, one of the board members, thinks that too many elected officials become state-funded contractors after leaving the legislature and that the initiative would have been a way to combat that cronyism.

In January, 2008, South Dakotans for Open and Clean Government announced that they had received $10,000 to support their efforts from Americans for Tax Reform, a national taxpayer advocacy group.

=== Donors to Measure 10 ===
The most recent financial reporting filings shows South Dakotans for Open and Clean Government reported donations in the amount of $175,800. South Dakota Conservative Action Council, a 501(c)(4) tax-exempt organization gave $175,000. The campaign report lists all donors.

Opponents of Initiated Measure 10 have said that the South Dakota Conservative Action Council must release its donor list because it made a donation to the ballot committee. A complaint or lawsuit to substantiate this has not been filed. Supporters of 10 say that it is hypocritical for opponents to attack it on this issue because they are not calling for other 501c nonprofit groups that have given to other statewide ballot campaigns ("VoteYesForLife.com," Yes on 11; "Healthy Families," No on 11, and "NO on 10") to release their donor lists.

The National Taxpayers Union supports government spending transparency on their ShowMeTheSpending.org web site, including online databases of grant and contract spending.

=== Supporters file lawsuit ===
Supporters of Measure 10 filed a lawsuit in late October alleging that the Brown County Commission acting illegally when it passed a resolution in opposition to 10. They say that Brown County broke a law that forbids governments from spending money to influence elections. The state's attorney general disagrees with this interpretation of the law, and says that local governments in South Dakota are free to take positions on ballot measures.

=== Path to the ballot ===
On March 21, 2008, South Dakotans for Open and Clean Government announced that they had submitted more than 26,500 signatures to the South Dakota Secretary of State—nearly 10,000 more than the minimum requirement. On April 3, South Dakota Secretary of State Chris Nelson certified the measure for the fall ballot after a random sample of 5% of the submitted signatures indicated a sufficiently high validity rate.

== Opposition ==
Governor Mike Rounds came out in opposition to the measure, saying that it is not well thought out and has the potential to interfere with the political rights of South Dakota citizens. Critics of the governor were not surprised by his position, considering that he is one of the "recipient(s) of tens of thousands of dollars of campaign contributions from holders of no-bid contractors, contractors who received tens of millions of dollars back".

The state Retirement System opposed the measure and has participated in sending a mailing to its 70,000 members urging them to vote "no" on election day. The legality of such a letter is questionable, but upon the advice of Attorney General Larry Long they moved forward with the mailing.

Groups like the South Dakota Association of County Commissioners, which collects tax-funded dues from all 66 counties, did not agree with the measure, saying that it is too far-reaching. Both of the state's major political parties have also announced their opposition to it.,

The Boards of Directors of the S.D. Cattlemen's Association and the S.D. Farm Bureau voted to oppose Measure 10 calling the ballot language "poorly written".
