= KREW =

- Plainview, Texas; United States
- Frequency: 1400 kHz
- Branding: Hometown Radio 1400 KREW

Programming
- Format: News/Talk/Sports
- Affiliations: SportsMap

Ownership
- Owner: Monte Spearman and Gentry Todd Spearman; (High Plains Radio Network, LLC)
- Sister stations: KKYN-FM, KRIA, KVOP

History
- First air date: August 14, 1944; 82 years ago (as KVCP)
- Former call signs: KVCP (1944-2002)

Technical information
- Licensing authority: FCC
- Facility ID: 54683
- Class: C
- Power: 1,000 watts
- Transmitter coordinates: 34°12′55.00″N 101°43′25.00″W

Links
- Public license information: Public file; LMS

KREW (1400 AM) is a radio station licensed in Plainview, Texas. The station airs a news/talk/sports format and is owned by Monte Spearman and Gentry Todd Spearman, through licensee High Plains Radio Network, LLC. It also does simulcasts with station KKYN-FM and plays classic country music.

The station initially joined the Mutual Broadcasting System but is now a member of the Texas High Plains Radio Network.

== Station history ==
In 1944, Plainview, Texas radio began, after the FCC granted a license for a station with the callsign KVOP to broadcast as a 250-watt station. Over time, other stations were added, and now the Plainview sister stations consists of KVOP, KKYN-FM, KREW and KRIA.
