= Plainview High School (Texas) =

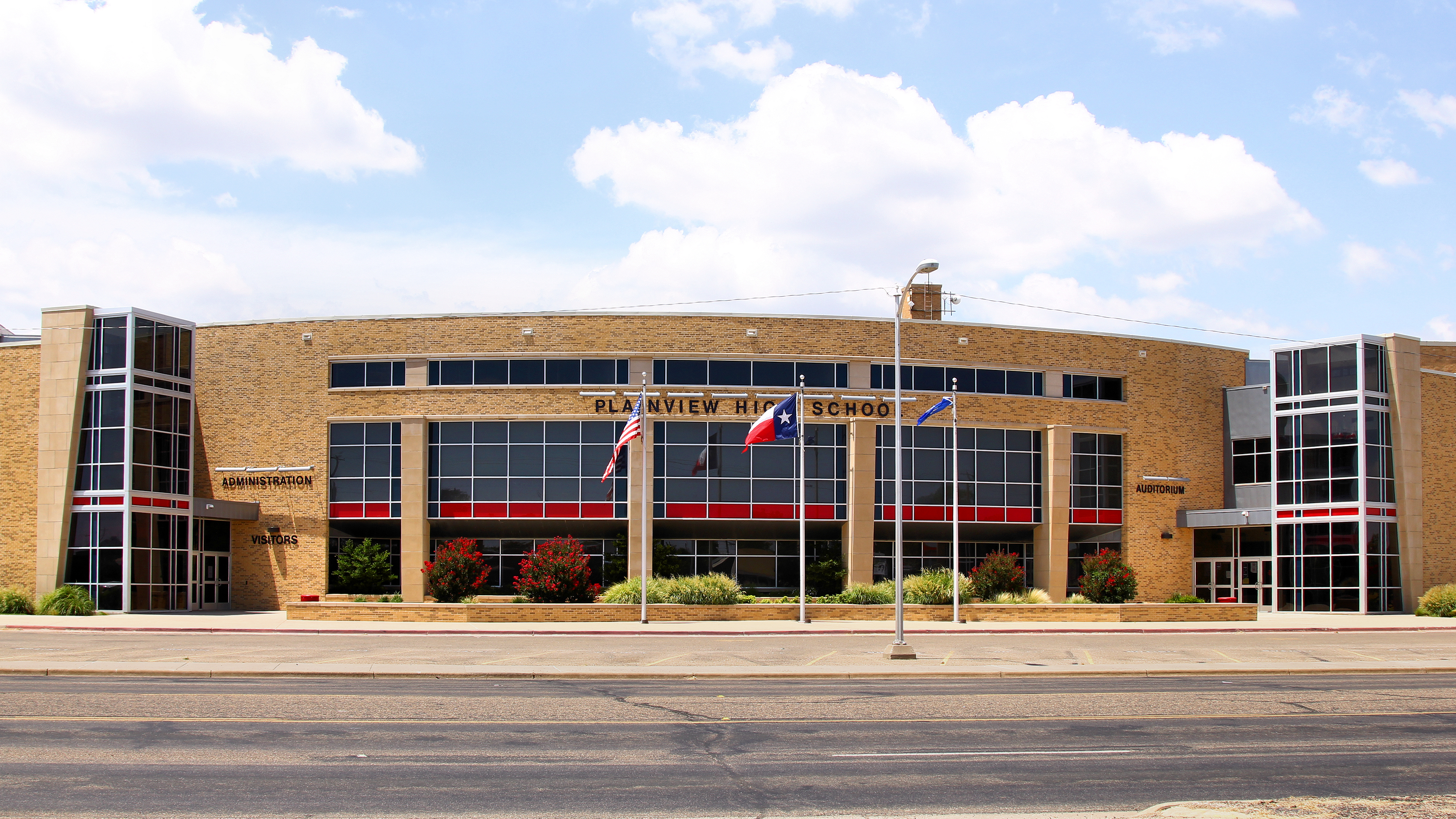

Location
- 1501 Quincy St. Plainview, Texas 79072-5099; United States; 34.1969°N 101.7258°W

Information
- School type: Public high school
- School district: Plainview Independent School District
- Principal: Brandt Reagan
- Teaching staff: 112.97 (FTE)
- Grades: 9-12
- Enrollment: 1,430 (2023–2024)
- Student to teacher ratio: 12.66
- Colors: Scarlet Red & Navy
- Athletics conference: UIL Class AAAAA
- Mascot: Bulldog
- Yearbook: Plain View
- Website: www.plainviewisd.org/o/phs/

Plainview High School is a public high school located in the city of Plainview, Texas, USA and classified as a 5A school by the UIL. It is a part of the Plainview Independent School District located in northeast Hale County. In 2015, the school was rated "Met Standard" by the Texas Education Agency.

== Athletics ==
The Plainview Bulldogs compete in these sports -

Volleyball, Cross Country, Football, Basketball, Powerlifting, Golf, Tennis, Track, Baseball & Softball

=== State Titles ===
Plainview (UIL)

- Boys Basketball -
  - 1994(4A)
- Girls Basketball -
  - 1987(5A), 2001(4A), 2002(4A), 2003(4A)

==== State Finalist ====
Plainview (UIL)

- Girls Basketball -
  - 2004(4A)

Plainview Washington (PVIL)

- Boys Basketball -
  - 1954(PVIL-B)

== Theater ==
- One Act Play -
  - 1928(All)

== Student performance ==
As of 2008 That year the four-year high school dropout rate of Plainview High was almost two times larger than the average in Texas. The head of the alternative high school Houston School, Tommy Chatham, stated in 2008 that there were multiple jobs in Plainview that did not require a high school diploma.

== Notable alumni ==
- Bob Bryant, American Football League player
- Michael Egnew, National Football League player
- Leonard Garcia, MMA artist
- Lawrence McCutcheon, running back for the Los Angeles Rams from 1972–1979, the Denver Broncos and Seattle Seahawks in 1980 and the Buffalo Bills in 1981.
- Lavern Roach, (1925-1950) boxer, who was Ring Magazine's Rookie-of-the-Year in 1947. He died of bleeding in the brain after being punched during a match on his 25th birthday.
- Jerry Sisemore, National Football League player
- Jamar Wall, National Football League and Canadian Football League player
