= Abernathy High School =

Location
- 505 7th St; Abernathy, Texas 79311; United States; 33°49′48″N 101°50′44″W

Information
- School type: Public high school
- School district: Abernathy Independent School District
- Principal: Ezra Chambers
- Teaching staff: 26.44 (FTE)
- Grades: 9-12
- Enrollment: 225 (2023–2024)
- Student to teacher ratio: 8.51
- Colors: Maroon and White
- Athletics conference: UIL Class 2A
- Mascot: Antelope/Lady Lope
- Website: Abernathy High School

Abernathy High School is a public high school located in Abernathy, Texas, United States. It is part of the Abernathy Independent School District located in central Hale County and classified as a 2A school by the UIL. In 2015, the school was rated "Met Standard" by the Texas Education Agency.

== Athletics ==
The Abernathy Antelopes compete in cross country, American football, basketball, powerlifting, tennis, track, golf, softball and baseball.

=== State titles ===
- Boys' basketball -
  - 1980(2A), 1991(2A)
- Girls' basketball -
  - 1958(2A), 1959(2A), 1981(3A), 1984(3A), 1986(2A), 1991(2A)
- Boys' cross country -
  - 1984(2A)
- Girls' cross country -
  - 1978(B), 1991(2A)

==== State finalists ====
- Girls' basketball -
  - 1985(2A), 1989(2A), 2003(2A)
