= Hale Center High School =

Location
- 411 Owl Dr. Hale Center, Texas 79041; United States
- Coordinates: 34.0537°N 101.8512°W

Information
- School type: Public high school
- School district: Hale Center Independent School District
- Principal: Misty McClurg
- Teaching staff: 16.48 (FTE)
- Grades: 9-12
- Enrollment: 173 (2023–2024)
- Student to teacher ratio: 10.50
- Colors: Blue & gold
- Athletics conference: UIL Class AA
- Mascot: Hootie
- Nickname: Owls
- Website: Hale Center High School

Hale Center High School is a public high school located in the city of Hale Center, Texas, USA and classified as a 2A school by the UIL. It is a part of the Hale Center Independent School District located in central Hale County. In 2015, the school was rated "Met Standard" by the Texas Education Agency.

== Athletics ==
The Hale Center Owls compete in these sports

Cross Country, Football, Basketball, Powerlifting, Tennis, Track, Baseball & Softball

=== State Titles ===
- Girls Basketball -
  - 1979(1A)

== Notable graduates ==
- Jo-Carroll Dennison (1940), Miss America 1942 and actress
