= Donna Hedgepath =

14th President of Wayland Baptist University
- Incumbent
- Assumed office July 1, 2024
- Preceded by: Bobby Hall

Personal details
- Children: 3
- Education: Campbellsville University; University of Kentucky

Donna Hedgepath is an American academic administrator serving as the fourteenth president of Wayland Baptist University since 2024. She was previously the provost at Campbellsville University.

== Life ==
Hedgepath completed a bachelor of music in music education (1992) and master of music in music education with core content for arts and humanities curriculum (1999) from Campbellsville University. She earned a Ph.D. in music education from the University of Kentucky in August 2006.

From 1993 to 2001, Hedgepath was a teacher in the Marion County School District. She was dean of the Campbellsville University School of Education for two years. She later served as the provost and vice president of academic affairs. In January 2024, Hedgepath was selected as the president-elect of Wayland Baptist University. On July 1, 2024, she succeeded Bobby Hall as its fourteenth president. She is the first woman to serve in the role.

Hedgepath is married and has three sons.
