= Plainview Site =

- U.S. National Register of Historic Places
- U.S. National Historic Landmark
- Location: Address restricted
- Nearest city: Plainview, Texas
- Area: 1 acre (0.40 ha)
- NRHP reference No.: 66000814

Significant dates
- Added to NRHP: October 15, 1966
- Designated NHL: January 20, 1961

The Plainview Site is a prehistoric Native American archeological site near Plainview, Texas, United States. Plainview point spear tips, commonly found in the Central Plains, were first described here, and date to 7800-5100 BC. The site was designated a National Historic Landmark in 1961.

== Description ==
The Plainview Site is located on the banks of Running Water Draw in Hale County, Texas. The site is that of a kill site, where hunters either drove the animals off a cliff or trapped them in a river bend. Fossil remnants of more than 100 animals (a prehistoric form of the American bison) have been found at the site, as were more than 20 projectile points and other stone artifacts. The site has been subjected to illegal digging and vandalism.

The site has long been known locally as a source of prehistoric artifacts, but was not formally investigated until the 1940s, after a gravel mining operation began in the area. In 1944, Glen L. Evans and Grayson Meade led a systematic investigation of the site. Although the remains of many animals were found, they were missing both skulls and tailbones, suggesting that these were removed to another location for further processing and use. They dug a pit to understand the site's stratigraphy which was enlarged in 1945 and followed by additional pits in subsequent years. The site was again investigated in the 1970s, at which time the extent of the kill bed was enlarged. Subsequent research into materials collected at the site suggests that it was repeatedly used as a kill site. The site's finds have also shed light on the butchering techniques of hunters.

== See also ==
- Plainview Commercial Historic District
- National Register of Historic Places listings in Hale County, Texas
- List of National Historic Landmarks in Texas
