= Seth Ward (Methodist bishop) =

Seth Ward (15 November 1858 – 20 September 1909) was an American bishop of the Methodist Episcopal Church, South, elected in 1906.

== Birth and family ==
He was born in a log cabin near Bryan, Texas, a son of Samuel Goode and Sara Ann Ward. His parents educated him at home. Seth married Margaret E. South of Bryan 5 January 1886. They had three children.

== Ordained ministry ==
Seth was ordained to the Methodist ministry in 1881. After serving as a junior preacher on the Corsicana Circuit, he was appointed successively to Centerville, Kosse, Calvert, the St. James Church of Galveston, Huntsville, the Houston Circuit, and the Shearn Church of Houston. He was Secretary of the Texas Annual Conference of the M.E. Church, South (1898–1900). He was appointed Conference Secretary of Education in 1900. As head of field work for the Twentieth Century Commission on Education, Rev. Ward succeeded in securing an average of a dollar per member for Methodist educational work. After the Galveston Hurricane of 1900, he united St. John and St. James churches into the First Methodist Church of Galveston. For four years he was also Assistant Missionary Secretary of his denomination.

== Episcopal ministry ==
The Rev. Seth Ward was elected to the episcopacy by the General Conference which met in Birmingham, Alabama. He was the first native Texan to become a bishop in the Methodist Church. As bishop he was twice elected to preside at missionary conferences in Japan, China, and Korea. On his second visit to the Orient, Bishop Ward died 20 September 1909 at Kobe, Japan. He was buried in Houston.

Seth Ward College in Seth Ward, Texas a suburb of Plainview, Texas, and Ward Memorial Church at Austin, Texas were named for him.

== Biographies ==
- Frontier Times, March 1942.
- Hotchkiss, O.T., Memoir of Bishop Seth Ward, Journal of the Seventieth Annual Session, Texas Conference of the Methodist Episcopal Church, South, 1909.
- Houston Post, 21 September 1909.
- History of Texas Methodism, 1900-1960, Austin, 1961.
- Who Was Who in America, Vol. 1.

== See also ==
- List of bishops of the United Methodist Church
