= Jim Landtroop =

American politician

Member of the Texas House of Representatives from the 85th district
- In office 2011–2013
- Preceded by: Joe Heflin
- Succeeded by: Ken King (district 88)

Personal details
- Born: James F. Landtroop Jr. January 18, 1968 (age 58) Fort Worth, Texas
- Party: Republican
- Spouse: Cathy Landtroop

James F. Landtroop Jr. (born January 18, 1968) is an American politician and insurance businessman. He has previously served in the Texas House of Representatives, serving District 85 for one term in the early 2010s.

== Political career ==
Landtroop first campaigned for the Texas House of Representatives in 2006, challenging Joe Heflin as both fought for the seat vacated by the retiring Pete Laney.

In 2010, Landtroop challenged Heflin again after defeating David Andrews in a partisan primary election. Landtroop won the election, garnering 62% of the vote. During his first term in the House, Landtroop was named vice chairman of the rural caucus.

After his first legislative term, Landtroop was redistricted in to District 88 and lost the Republican runoff to Ken King. Landtroop claimed the move was Republican leadership reprimanding him for not supporting House speaker Joe Straus. After that election, Landtroop and his family moved from Plainview, Texas to Lubbock, Texas.

In 2015, Landtroop announced his intentions to challenge incumbent John Frullo in a House District 84 election. Landtroop was defeated in the primary election.

== Personal life ==
Landtroop is an insurance agent affiliated with State Farm. He graduated from Keller High School, and after initially attending Texas Wesleyan University, graduated from Texas A&M University. Landtroop and his wife Cathy have three children.

== Electoral history ==
Texas House of Representatives, 85th District, 2006
Party	Candidate	Votes	%
General Election
Democratic	Joe Heflin	14,323	49.01%
Republican	Jim Landtroop	14,106	48.37%
Libertarian	David K. Schumacher	793	2.71%
Total votes		29,222	100.0%
Democratic hold			

Texas House of Representatives, 85th District, 2010
Party	Candidate	Votes	%
Primary Election
Republican	Jim Landtroop	7,409	65.50%
Republican	Mark Andrews	3,902	35.50%
Total votes		11,311	100.0%
General Election
Republican	Jim Landtroop	17,416	61.91%
Democratic	Joe Heflin	10,713	38.09%
Total votes		28,129	100.0%
Republican gain from Democratic			

Texas House of Representatives, District 88, 2012
Party	Candidate	Votes	%
Primary Election
Republican	Jim Landtroop	6,251	34.12%
Republican	Ken King	5,575	30.43%
Republican	Mac Smith	3,331	18.18%
Republican	Gary Walker	3.162	17.26%
Total votes		18,319	100.0%
Primary Runoff Election
Republican	Ken King	7.542	53.98%
Republican	Jim Landtroop	6,430	46.02%
Total votes		13,972	100.0%

Texas House of Representatives, District 84, 2016
Party	Candidate	Votes	%
Primary Election
Republican	John Frullo	9,895	55.20%
Republican	Jim Landtroop	8,032	44.80%
Total votes		17,927	100.0%
