= Cotton Center High School =

Location
- FM 79 & FM 37; Cotton Center, Texas 79021-0350; United States; 33.986003°N 101.992446°W

Information
- School type: Public high school
- School district: Cotton Center Independent School District
- Superintendent: Ryan Bobo
- Principal: Allen Keys
- Teaching staff: 15.17 (FTE)
- Grades: PK-12
- Enrollment: 105 (2023–2024)
- Student to teacher ratio: 6.92
- Colors: Black and gold
- Athletics conference: UIL Class A
- Mascot: Elk/Lady Elk
- Website: Cotton Center High School

Cotton Center High School or Cotton Center School is a public school located in unincorporated Cotton Center, Texas (USA), a small farming community in the southern panhandle portion of the state and classified as a 1A school by the UIL. The school is part of the Cotton Center Independent School District which encompasses west central Hale County. In 2015, the school was rated "Met Standard" by the Texas Education Agency.

== Athletics ==
The Cotton Center Elks compete in the following sports -

- Cross Country
- 6-Man Football
- Basketball
- Golf
- Tennis
- Track and Field

=== State finalists ===
- Girls Basketball -
  - 1955(B)
- Football -
  - 1978(6M), 1979(6M)
