= James Henry Wayland =

American physician

James Henry Wayland (1863–1948) was a physician and businessman who was the founder of Wayland Baptist University in Plainview, Texas.

He was born in Randolph County, Missouri studied at the Kentucky School of Medicine and then practiced in Fort Worth, Texas and Azle before moving to Plainview in 1888 where he developed a large medical practice and also served workers of the Santa Fe Railroad. He was known for providing extraordinary care for his patients offering home visits, providing the first X-ray machine in the town, and often for praying for his patients. He was also active in planting trees in and around Plainview. Wayland married Sarah Tucker and they had nine children. Wayland helped found the First Baptist Church in Plainview and was a local civic and church leader.

In 1906 Dr. and Mrs. Wayland offered $10,000 and 25 acres (10 ha) of land in Plainview, Texas for a Baptist college if the Staked Plains Baptist Association and the citizens of the city would raise an additional $40,000. In 1910, the school offered its first classes. Wayland served on the committee that brought the railroad to Plainview in 1907. He also operated a drugstore and the Wayland Hotel. Wayland died in 1948, and Sarah Wayland died in 1955.
