= Texas's 88th House of Representatives district =

Electoral district of Texas

Texas's 88th State House of Representatives district
Representative
Ken King; R–Canadian

District 88 is a district in the Texas House of Representatives. It has been represented by Republican Ken King since 2013.

== Geography ==
The district contains the counties of Andrews, Bailey, Briscoe, Castro, Childress, Cochran, Collingsworth, Donley, Gaines, Gray, Hale, Hall, Hansford, Hemphill, Hockley, Lamb, Roberts, Swisher, Wheeler, and Yoakum.

== Members ==
- Ken King (since 2013)
