= Abernathy Advocate =

Newspaper from Texas

- Founded: 2017
- Circulation: 998 (as of 2023)
- Website: cityofabernathy.org

Abernathy Advocate has been the local newspaper for Abernathy, Texas, since 2017. The newspaper is published weekly, and on 12 July 2021, the newspaper was designated the official newspaper of the city by the Abernathy City Council.
