= Seth Ward, Texas =

- Census-designated place
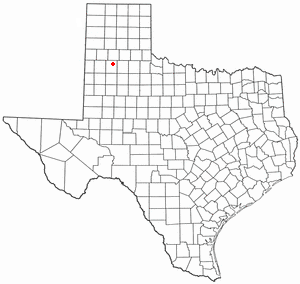
- Location of Seth Ward, Texas

- Coordinates: 34°12′45″N 101°41′46″W
- Country: United States
- State: Texas
- County: Hale

Area
  - Total: 2.2 sq mi (5.8 km^{2})
  - Land: 2.2 sq mi (5.8 km^{2})
  - Water: 0 sq mi (0.0 km^{2})
- Elevation: 3,373 ft (1,028 m)

Population (2020)
  - Total: 1,603
  - Density: 720/sq mi (280/km^{2})
- Time zone: UTC-6 (Central (CST))
  - Summer (DST): UTC-5 (CDT)
- FIPS code: 48-66848
- GNIS feature ID: 1367965

Seth Ward is an unincorporated community and census-designated place (CDP) in Hale County, Texas, United States. As of the 2020 census, Seth Ward had a population of 1,603.

== History ==
It is named for Seth Ward College, which was founded in 1910 by Methodist bishop Seth Ward, who took over Central Plains College and Conservatory of Music (founded in 1907) to form Seth Ward College. The school burned in 1916 and was not rebuilt.

Country singer Jimmy Dean was born in Seth Ward.

== Geography ==
Seth Ward is located in northeastern Hale County at 34°12′45″N 101°41′46″W (34.212421, -101.696088). It is bordered to the southwest by the city of Plainview, the county seat. Interstate 27 passes just north of Seth Ward, with access from Exit 53. I-27 leads north 74 miles (119 km) to Amarillo and south 50 miles (80 km) to Lubbock.

According to the United States Census Bureau, the CDP has a total area of 2.2 square miles (5.8 km^{2}), all of it land.

== Demographics ==
Historical population
Census	Pop.	Note	%±
1980	1,186		—
1990	1,402		18.2%
2000	1,926		37.4%
2010	2,025		5.1%
2020	1,603		−20.8%
U.S. Decennial Census; 1850–1900 1910; 1920 1930 1940; 1950 1960 1970; 1980 1990 2000; 2010

Seth Ward first appeared as a census designated place in the 1980 United States census.

=== 2020 census ===
Seth Ward CDP, Texas – Racial and ethnic composition Note: the US Census treats Hispanic/Latino as an ethnic category. This table excludes Latinos from the racial categories and assigns them to a separate category. Hispanics/Latinos may be of any race.
Race / Ethnicity (NH = Non-Hispanic)	Pop 2000	Pop 2010	Pop 2020	% 2000	% 2010	% 2020
White alone (NH)	602	451	294	31.26%	22.27%	18.34%
Black or African American alone (NH)	58	28	11	3.01%	1.38%	0.69%
Native American or Alaska Native alone (NH)	15	10	5	0.78%	0.49%	0.31%
Asian alone (NH)	1	2	0	0.05%	0.10%	0.00%
Native Hawaiian or Pacific Islander alone (NH)	0	0	1	0.00%	0.00%	0.06%
Other race alone (NH)	0	2	0	0.00%	0.10%	0.00%
Mixed race or Multiracial (NH)	16	25	18	0.83%	1.23%	1.12%
Hispanic or Latino (any race)	1,234	1,507	1,274	64.07%	74.42%	79.48%
Total	1,926	2,025	1,603	100.00%	100.00%	100.00%

As of the 2020 United States census, there were 1,603 people, 509 households, and 387 families residing in the CDP.

=== 2000 census ===
As of the census of 2000, there were 1,926 people, 586 households, and 467 families residing in the CDP. The population density was 1,198.7 inhabitants per square mile (462.8/km^{2}). There were 693 housing units at an average density of 431.3 per square mile (166.5/km^{2}). The racial makeup of the CDP was 60.02% White, 3.63% African American, 1.04% Native American, 0.05% Asian, 32.76% from other races, and 2.49% from two or more races. Hispanic or Latino of any race were 64.07% of the population.

There were 586 households, out of which 48.8% had children under the age of 18 living with them, 56.0% were married couples living together, 16.0% had a female householder with no husband present, and 20.3% were non-families. 16.7% of all households were made up of individuals, and 6.0% had someone living alone who was 65 years of age or older. The average household size was 3.29 and the average family size was 3.69.

In the CDP, the population was spread out, with 38.0% under the age of 18, 9.8% from 18 to 24, 27.9% from 25 to 44, 15.4% from 45 to 64, and 8.9% who were 65 years of age or older. The median age was 27 years. For every 100 females, there were 91.5 males. For every 100 females age 18 and over, there were 99.0 males.

The median income for a household in the CDP was $24,167, and the median income for a family was $28,000. Males had a median income of $22,152 versus $18,583 for females. The per capita income for the CDP was $9,663. About 19.2% of families and 25.7% of the population were below the poverty line, including 28.9% of those under age 18 and 44.5% of those age 65 or over.

== Education ==
Seth Ward is served by the Plainview Independent School District.
