= KVOP =

- Plainview, Texas; United States
- Frequency: 1090 kHz
- Branding: "AM 1090"

Programming
- Format: News/Talk

Ownership
- Owner: Monty Spearman and Gentry Todd Spearman; (High Plains Radio Network, LLC)
- Sister stations: KKYN-FM, KRIA, KREW

History
- First air date: 1976; 50 years ago
- Former call signs: KKYN (1976–2002)

Technical information
- Licensing authority: FCC
- Facility ID: 54681
- Class: B
- Power: 5,000 watts (day); 500 watts (night)
- Transmitter coordinates: 34°5′32.00″N 101°38′26.00″W

Links
- Public license information: Public file; LMS
- Website: www.hpr.network/texas

KVOP (1090 AM) is a radio station broadcasting a News/Talk format. KVOP is licensed to serve the community of Plainview, Texas, United States, but as of May 2024 it is silent.

In late-August 2015, 1090's talkshow schedule and network news affiliation was changed when a change of branding occurred to 1090/1590 The Hub, from the previous 'The Mighty 1090'. 1590 AM KDAV in Lubbock began simulcasting 1090 KVOP when "The Hub" branding was launched. Some of the talkshows previously airing 1090, like Rush Limbaugh, Lynn Wooley and Dave Ramsey, were moved to 1400 KREW.

The new weekday lineup launched in late-August 2015 included: 12a-5a Red Eye Radio (WBAP/Westwood One), 5a-8a VSA Ag Network, 8a-11a Glenn Beck, 11a-2p Dennis Prager, 2p-5p Michael Medved, 5p-8p Hugh Hewitt, 8p-10p Eric Metaxas.

In May 2018, KVOP made a filing with the FCC to go silent due to a failure of its transmitter.

The station is currently owned by Monty Spearman and Gentry Todd Spearman, through licensee High Plains Radio Network, LLC.
