= Plainview Herald =

Newspaper in Plainview, Texas

- Type: Daily newspaper
- Format: Broadsheet
- Owner: Hearst Communications
- Publisher: Robert C. Granfeldt
- Editor: Ellysa Harris
- Founded: 1889
- Headquarters: 820 Broadway St. Plainview, Texas 79072-7316
- Circulation: 1,289 (as of 2023)
- Website: www.myplainview.com

The Plainview Herald, originally published as the Plainview Daily Herald, is a daily newspaper in Plainview, Texas. The newspaper is published in the nation's largest cotton-growing region and on the edge of the nation's heaviest concentration of cattle-feeding and beef-packing operations.

== History ==
The newspaper is owned by Hearst Corporation, which also owns other magazines and media outlets, such as the San Francisco Chronicle and the Houston Chronicle. The newspaper was acquired by the corporation in 1979.

In 1994, the Herald became one of the first Texas newspapers of its size to be fully computer paginated, and shortly thereafter began delivering full-color front-page layouts daily.

== Awards ==
- Sweepstakes Award of the West Texas Press Association.
- Panhandle Press Association's General Excellence Award.
- Online edition, Myplainview.com, is three time first-place winner of Best Online Newspaper in its size category by Texas Associated Press Managing Editors
- A pioneer in the Internet business, the Herald established and hosted their own online edition about the same time they established precursor of the Internet company Texas Online, aka USA Online, in 1994. Though the newspaper sold the business in 1999, it was later expanded to include former ISPs in Midland, Odessa, El Paso, Arlington and Laredo, Texas, and Albuquerque, New Mexico, under the banner USA Online, Inc. These later merged and are operated by Whitehorse Communications of El Paso, Texas.

== Name Change ==
In 2011, the newspaper stopped delivery of its Monday edition, no longer making it a "daily" newspaper. The "daily" has been dropped from the name, making it now Plainview Herald.
