= Hale County, Texas =

County in Texas, United States

- County
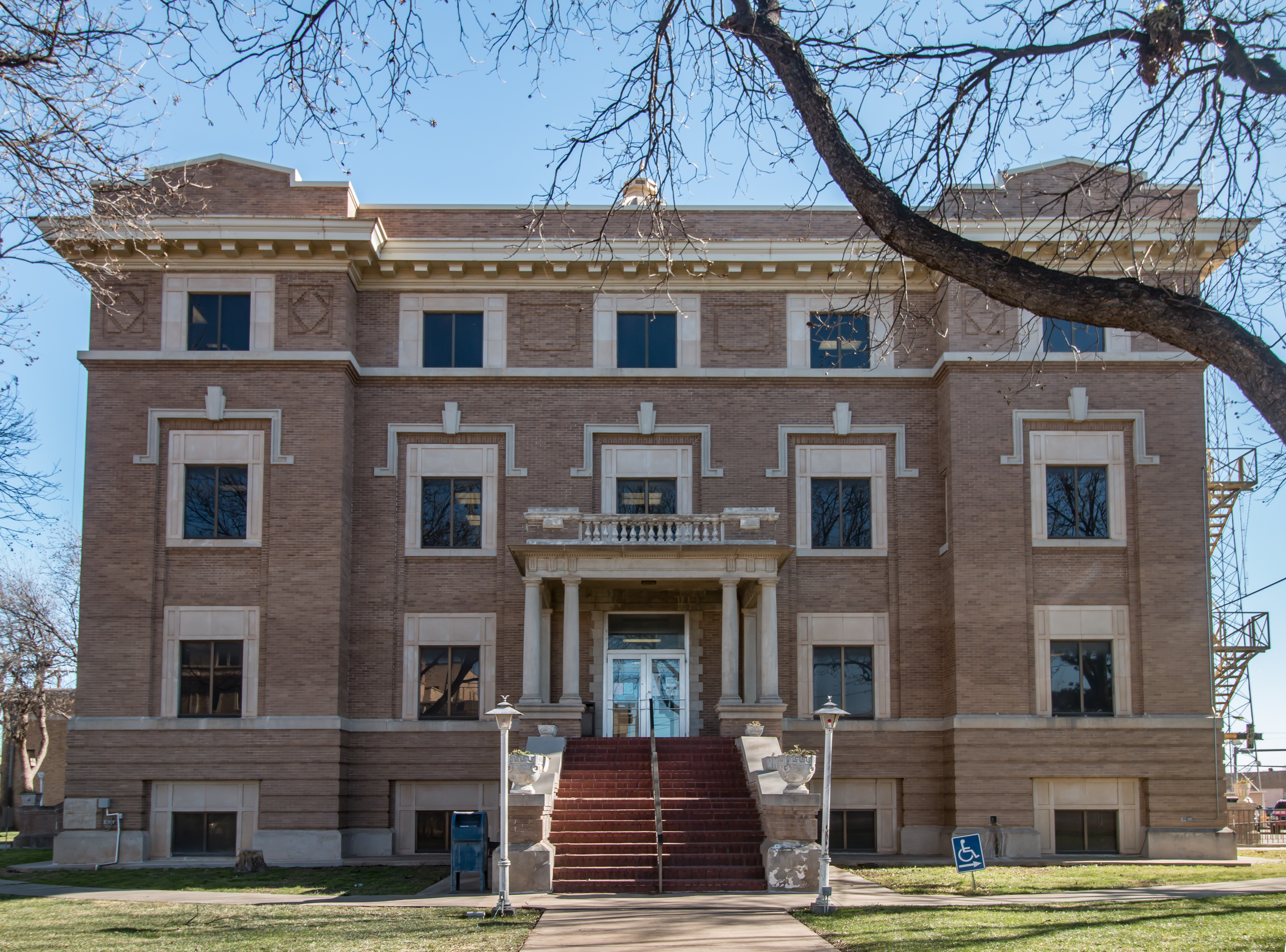
- The Hale County Courthouse in Plainview

- Location within the U.S. state of Texas
- Coordinates: 34°04′N 101°50′W
- Country: United States
- State: Texas
- Founded: 1888
- Seat: Plainview
- Largest city: Plainview

Area
  - Total: 1,005 sq mi (2,600 km^{2})
  - Land: 1,005 sq mi (2,600 km^{2})
  - Water: 0.1 sq mi (0.26 km^{2}) 0.01%

Population (2020)
  - Total: 32,522
  - Estimate (2025): 31,819 ▼
  - Density: 32.36/sq mi (12.49/km^{2})
- Time zone: UTC−6 (Central)
  - Summer (DST): UTC−5 (CDT)
- Congressional district: 19th
- Website: www.halecounty.org

Hale County is a county located in the U.S. state of Texas. As of the 2020 census, its population was 32,522. Its county seat is Plainview. The county was created in 1876 and organized in 1888. It is named for Lt. John C. Hale, a hero of the Battle of San Jacinto.

Hale County comprises the Plainview, Texas micropolitan statistical area.

== History ==
In 7000 BC, Paleo-Indians were the first county inhabitants. Later Native American inhabitants included the Comanche. The Texas Legislature formed Hale County from Bexar County in 1876. A few years later (1881), brothers T.W. and T.N. Morrison, and W.D. Johnson, established the Cross L Ranch and the XIT to raise cattle. In 1883, New York Methodist minister Horatio Graves became the first white permanent settler in the county.

The city of Plainview has its beginnings in 1886 when rancher Zachery Taylor Maxwell moved his family and 2,000 sheep from Floyd County to the site of two hackberry groves on the old military trail established by Col. Ranald S. Mackenzie. The city's name comes from the area's vista. The county was organized in 1888, with Plainview as the county seat. By 1900, the county had 259 farms and ranches, with a population of 1,680.

The Santa Fe Railway came to Plainview in 1906, and Wayland Baptist College was founded the same year. In 1909, businessman Levi Schick opened the Schick Opera House. The county's first motor-driven irrigation well was drilled five years later. The Texas Land and Development Company was organized in Plainview in 1912. Its purpose was to entice settlers by dividing a large tract of land into individual farms, and preparing each farm for occupancy.

The Plainview Site was discovered in 1944. In addition to bone and man-made artifacts, archeologists found the remains of 100 extinct bison about twice the size of modern "buffalo".

Oil was discovered in 1946 in the Anton-Irish field of Lamb and Hale Counties.

Country artist Jimmy Dean, his brother Don Dean, and cousin-in-law Troy Pritchard founded the Jimmy Dean Sausage Company and opened the Jimmy Dean Meat Company in 1969. As of 2010, Hale County was one of 62 counties in Texas still legally barring the sale of alcohol. As of March 7, 2008, Plainview has allowed the sale of packaged alcohol within the city limits.

== Geography ==
According to the U.S. Census Bureau, the county has a total area of 1,005 square miles (2,600 km^{2}), of which 0.1 square miles (0.26 km^{2}) (0.01%) is covered by water.

=== Major highways ===
- Interstate 27/U.S. Highway 87
  - Interstate 27 Business
- U.S. Highway 70
- State Highway 194
- State Loop 369

=== Adjacent counties ===
- Swisher County (north)
- Floyd County (east)
- Lubbock County (south)
- Lamb County (west)
- Castro County (northwest)
- Hockley County (southwest)
- Crosby County (southeast)

== Demographics ==
Historical population
Census	Pop.	Note	%±
1890	721		—
1900	1,680		133.0%
1910	7,566		350.4%
1920	10,104		33.5%
1930	20,189		99.8%
1940	18,813		−6.8%
1950	28,211		50.0%
1960	36,798		30.4%
1970	34,137		−7.2%
1980	37,592		10.1%
1990	34,671		−7.8%
2000	36,602		5.6%
2010	36,227		−1.0%
2020	32,522		−10.2%
2025 (est.)	31,819	▼	−2.2%
U.S. Decennial Census; 1790–1960 1900–1990; 1990–2000 2010–2020

Hale County, Texas – Racial and ethnic composition Note: the US Census treats Hispanic/Latino as an ethnic category. This table excludes Latinos from the racial categories and assigns them to a separate category. Hispanics/Latinos may be of any race.
Race / Ethnicity (NH = Non-Hispanic)	Pop 2000	Pop 2010	Pop 2020	% 2000	% 2010	% 2020
White alone (NH)	16,526	13,647	10,693	45.15%	37.62%	32.88%
Black or African American alone (NH)	2,044	1,803	1,381	5.58%	4.97%	4.25%
Native American or Alaska Native alone (NH)	139	103	99	0.38%	0.28%	0.30%
Asian alone (NH)	107	133	149	0.29%	0.37%	0.46%
Pacific Islander alone (NH)	7	19	30	0.02%	0.05%	0.09%
Other race alone (NH)	18	32	69	0.05%	0.09%	0.21%
Mixed race or Multiracial (NH)	229	267	612	0.63%	0.74%	1.88%
Hispanic or Latino (any race)	17,532	20,269	19,489	47.90%	55.88%	59.93%
Total	36,602	36,273	32,522	100.00%	100.00%	100.00%

=== 2020 census ===
As of the 2020 census, the county had a population of 32,522. The median age was 35.9 years. 25.8% of residents were under the age of 18 and 15.2% of residents were 65 years of age or older. For every 100 females there were 105.4 males, and for every 100 females age 18 and over there were 105.4 males age 18 and over.

The racial makeup of the county was 52.0% White, 4.6% Black or African American, 0.9% American Indian and Alaska Native, 0.5% Asian, 0.1% Native Hawaiian and Pacific Islander, 22.6% from some other race, and 19.2% from two or more races. Hispanic or Latino residents of any race comprised 59.9% of the population.

69.5% of residents lived in urban areas, while 30.5% lived in rural areas.

There were 11,396 households in the county, of which 35.7% had children under the age of 18 living in them. Of all households, 48.6% were married-couple households, 17.9% were households with a male householder and no spouse or partner present, and 28.0% were households with a female householder and no spouse or partner present. About 26.2% of all households were made up of individuals and 11.8% had someone living alone who was 65 years of age or older.

There were 13,396 housing units, of which 14.9% were vacant. Among occupied housing units, 64.9% were owner-occupied and 35.1% were renter-occupied. The homeowner vacancy rate was 1.8% and the rental vacancy rate was 11.6%.

=== 2000 census ===
As of the 2000 census, there were 36,602 people, 11,975 households, and 9,136 families residing in the county. The population density was 36 people/mi^{2} (14 people/km^{2}). The 13,526 housing units averaged 14 units per square mile (5.4/km^{2}). The racial makeup of the county was 66.77% White, 5.79% African American, 0.92% Native American, 0.30% Asian, 23.80% from other races, and 2.42% from two or more races. About 47.90% of the population was Hispanic or Latino of any race.

Of the 11,975 households, 40.40% had children under the age of 18 living with them, 60.30% were married couples living together, 11.60% had a female householder with no husband present, and 23.70% were not families. About 21% of all households were made up of individuals, and 10.7% had someone living alone who was 65 years of age or older. The average household size was 2.86 and the average family size was 3.32.

In the county, the population was distributed as 30.20% under the age of 18, 11.40% from 18 to 24, 27.20% from 25 to 44, 18.30% from 45 to 64, and 12.90% who were 65 years of age or older. The median age was 31 years. For every 100 females there were 102.40 males. For every 100 females age 18 and over, there were 101.30 males.

The median income for a household in the county was $31,280, and for a family was $35,250. Males had a median income of $26,007 versus $20,057 for females. The per capita income for the county was $13,655. About 14.30% of families and 18.00% of the population were below the poverty line, including 23.30% of those under age 18 and 14.80% of those age 65 or over.

== Communities ==
=== Cities ===
- Abernathy (small part in Lubbock County)
- Hale Center
- Petersburg
- Plainview (county seat)

=== Town ===
- Edmonson

=== Census-designated place ===
- Seth Ward

=== Unincorporated community ===
- Cotton Center

=== Ghost town ===
- Hale City

== Politics ==
Hale County is located within District 88 of the Texas House of Representatives. Hale County is located within District 28 of the Texas Senate.

United States presidential election results for Hale County, Texas
Year	Republican		Democratic		Third party(ies)	
Year	No.	%	No.	%	No.	%
1912	26	3.74%	554	79.71%	115	16.55%
1916	80	7.71%	908	87.48%	50	4.82%
1920	352	20.96%	1,279	76.18%	48	2.86%
1924	507	24.84%	1,446	70.85%	88	4.31%
1928	2,143	65.98%	1,098	33.81%	7	0.22%
1932	369	10.74%	3,029	88.13%	39	1.13%
1936	451	12.59%	3,109	86.80%	22	0.61%
1940	906	20.96%	3,405	78.76%	12	0.28%
1944	712	16.26%	3,066	70.02%	601	13.72%
1948	1,013	19.08%	3,995	75.24%	302	5.69%
1952	4,858	59.06%	3,351	40.74%	17	0.21%
1956	3,804	49.64%	3,848	50.22%	11	0.14%
1960	4,784	56.07%	3,695	43.31%	53	0.62%
1964	3,666	38.21%	5,910	61.60%	18	0.19%
1968	4,696	45.60%	3,293	31.98%	2,309	22.42%
1972	7,051	76.04%	2,135	23.02%	87	0.94%
1976	5,390	48.97%	5,580	50.70%	37	0.34%
1980	7,277	65.86%	3,610	32.67%	163	1.48%
1984	7,670	70.43%	3,202	29.40%	19	0.17%
1988	6,284	64.05%	3,502	35.69%	25	0.25%
1992	6,098	59.59%	2,761	26.98%	1,375	13.44%
1996	5,905	60.59%	3,204	32.88%	637	6.54%
2000	6,868	75.39%	2,158	23.69%	84	0.92%
2004	8,025	79.03%	2,078	20.46%	51	0.50%
2008	7,171	72.12%	2,708	27.24%	64	0.64%
2012	6,490	73.30%	2,243	25.33%	121	1.37%
2016	6,366	71.87%	2,101	23.72%	391	4.41%
2020	7,177	74.87%	2,279	23.77%	130	1.36%
2024	7,283	78.44%	1,903	20.50%	99	1.07%

United States Senate election results for County, Texas1
Year	Republican		Democratic		Third party(ies)	
Year	No.	%	No.	%	No.	%
2024	6,941	75.49%	2,013	21.89%	241	2.62%

United States Senate election results for Hale County, Texas2
Year	Republican		Democratic		Third party(ies)	
Year	No.	%	No.	%	No.	%
2020	6,999	74.65%	2,155	22.98%	222	2.37%

Texas Gubernatorial election results for Hale County
Year	Republican		Democratic		Third party(ies)	
Year	No.	%	No.	%	No.	%
2022	5,094	80.49%	1,165	18.41%	70	1.11%

== Education ==
School districts serving the county include:

- Abernathy Independent School District
- Cotton Center Independent School District
- Hale Center Independent School District
- Lockney Independent School District
- Olton Independent School District
- Petersburg Independent School District
- Plainview Independent School District

The county is in the service area of South Plains College.

== See also ==
- Dry counties
- National Register of Historic Places listings in Hale County, Texas
- Recorded Texas Historic Landmarks in Hale County
