= Hale Center Independent School District =

School district in Texas

Coordinates: 34.0641°N 101.8458°W

Hale Center Independent School District is a public school district based in Hale Center, Texas, (US).

In 2009, the school district was rated "recognized" by the Texas Education Agency.

The school's mascot is the Owls. The official mascot is known as "Hootie", and is played by the student who has successfully tried out for the role.

== Schools ==
- Hale Center High School (Grades 9–12)
- Carr Middle (Grades 5–8)
- Akin Elementary (Grades PK-4)
