= Cotton Center Independent School District =

School district in Texas

Coordinates: 33.96225°N 102.02480°W

Cotton Center Independent School District is a public school district based in the community of Cotton Center, Texas (USA).

The district has one school, Cotton Center School that serves students in grades pre-kindergarten through 12.

== Academic achievement ==
In 2009, the school district was rated "academically acceptable" by the Texas Education Agency.

== Special programs ==
=== Athletics ===
Cotton Center High School plays six-man football.

== Controversy ==
In July 2024, the ACLU of Texas sent Cotton Center Independent School District a letter, alleging that the district's 2023-2024 dress and grooming code appeared to violate the Creating a Respectful and Open World for Natural Hair (or CROWN) Act, a Texas law which prohibits racial discrimination based on hair texture or style, and asking the district to revise its policies for the 2024-2025 school year.

== See also ==
- List of school districts in Texas
