= Wayland Baptist University =

Baptist university in Plainview, Texas, US

Coordinates: 34.186796°N 101.72621°W

- Former names: Wayland Literary and Technical Institute (1908–1910); Wayland Baptist College (1910–1980s)
- Motto: Better Together / Let There Be Light
- Type: Private university
- Established: 1908
- Religious affiliation: Baptist General Convention of Texas
- Endowment: US$68.5 million
- President: Donna Hedgepath
- Administrative staff: 500
- Students: 9,341 (all campuses 2021); 2,586 (Plainview campus 2021)
- Undergraduates: 6,850 (2021)
- Postgraduates: 2,491 (2021)
- Location: Plainview, Texas, U.S.
- Campus: Suburban, 155 acres (63 ha)
- Colors: Blue and gold
- Nicknames: Pioneers; Flying Queens (women's basketball)
- Sporting affiliations: NAIA – Sooner
- Mascot: Pioneer Pete
- Website: wbu.edu

Wayland Baptist University (WBU) is a private Baptist university based in Plainview, Texas. It is affiliated with the Baptist General Convention of Texas. Wayland Baptist has 11 campuses in five Texas cities, six states, American Samoa, and Kenya. Chartered in 1908, it had about 4,000 students in 2021, including about 900 students on its main campus.

== History ==
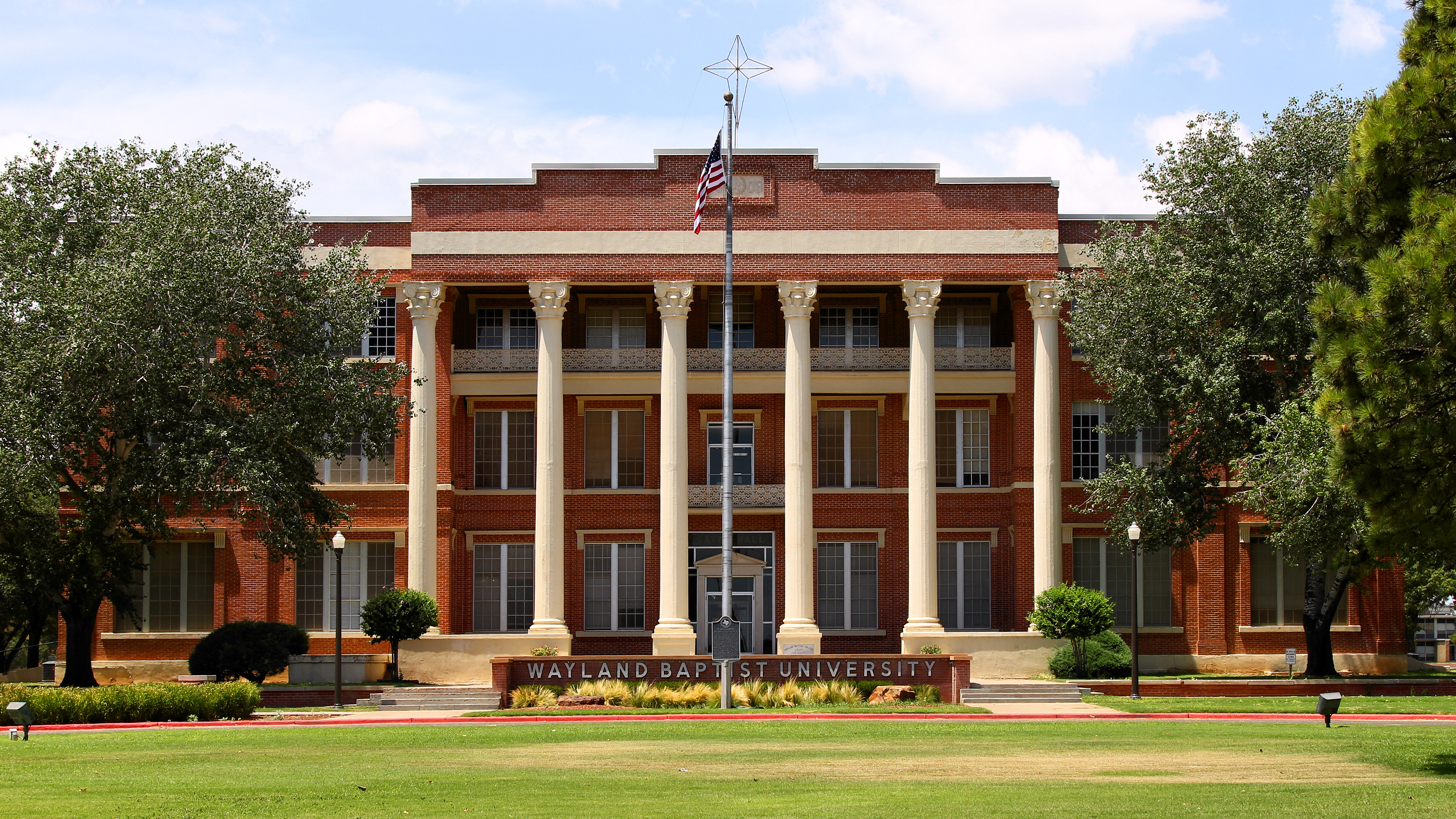
The main building at Wayland Baptist University

In 1906, James Henry Wayland and his wife offered US$10,000 and 25 acres (100,000 m^{2}) of land in Plainview if the Staked Plains Baptist Association and the citizens of the city would raise an additional $40,000. In 1910, the school offered its first classes, though the administration building was incomplete. During the school's first term, a total of 225 students were taking classes in primary education through junior college. After a public school system was well established in Plainview, the elementary grades were discontinued. Wayland Baptist was admitted to the American Association of Junior Colleges in 1926 and would later be approved as a senior college by the Texas Department of Education and the Southern Association of Colleges and Schools. The university is accredited by the Southern Association of Colleges and Schools and the Texas Education Agency for teacher education training.

The school is the oldest institution of higher education in continuous existence on the High Plains of Texas. When a run on the banks during the Great Depression threatened to close the school, George W. McDonald, the fifth president of the school, other administration officials, and faculty agreed to forgo pay to continue educating students, trusting God to supply their needs.

The school admitted no Black students until 1951, when a teacher, Annie Taylor of Floydada, Texas, asked the college whether she could fulfill continuing education requirements at the college. She enrolled with the consent of James W. "Bill" Marshall, the school's sixth president, making Wayland the first four-year liberal arts college in the former Confederate states to integrate voluntarily. This action came three years before the Supreme Court banned public school segregation in Brown v. Board of Education.

In 1979, Wayland opened its first campus outside Texas, in Hawaii. Ten satellite campuses are now located throughout the US.

In 2013, Wayland was ranked as the #72 university in the West Region by US News.

In 2015, Wayland applied for and was granted an exception to Title IX allowing the university to discriminate against LGBT students for religious reasons. In 2016, the organization Campus Pride ranked the college among the worst schools in Texas for LGBT students.

On July 1, 2024, Donna Hedgepath became the fourteenth president and the first woman to serve in the role.

== Schools ==
=== School of Math and Sciences ===
The School of Mathematics and Sciences at Wayland Baptist University administers all mathematics and science courses taught on the Plainview campus and also those taught online. Degrees are offered in math, math education, biology, molecular biology, chemistry, and geology, along with several preprofessional service course areas such as prenursing and pre-engineering. Currently, the school has 15 faculty members—6 math and 9 sciences, with three emeritus faculty. The School serves over 400 students each semester. On average, 20 to 30 students graduate with degrees from the school each year.

Initially, math and science courses were taught in several temporary locations on the WBU campus. Eventually, they, along with most other courses, were taught in Gates Hall, and later also in the library. The Division of Math and Science was formally designated in the 1940s. Science courses were moved to refurbished army barracks located on the north side of the campus in the 1960s. The Moody Science building was constructed in the early 1970s from a generous grant from the Moody Foundation. Several of the features in the new building were designed by faculty members. Since its completion, all Plainview campus math and science courses have been held there. In 2005, the university structure was reorganized, and the Division was redesignated as the School of Mathematics and Science. The School is housed in the Moody Science Building at 1900 W 7th Street, Plainview, Texas 79072.

=== List of schools ===
- School of Behavioral and Social Sciences
- School of Business
- School of Christian Studies
- School of Education
- School of Creative Arts
- School of Humanities and Leadership
- School of Mathematics and Sciences
- School of Nursing

== External campuses ==
- Amarillo, Texas
- Lubbock, Texas
- Kapolei, Hawaii
- Phoenix, Arizona
- San Antonio, Texas
- Sierra Vista, Arizona
- Wichita Falls, Texas
- American Samoa

== Athletics ==
The Wayland Baptist athletic teams are called the Pioneers. The university is a member of the National Association of Intercollegiate Athletics (NAIA), primarily competing in the Sooner Athletic Conference (SAC) since the 1994–95 academic year. The Pioneers previously competed as an NAIA Independent from 1978–79 to 1993–94; and in the Texoma Athletic Conference from 1970–71 to 1977–78.

Wayland Baptist compete in 17 intercollegiate varsity sports: Men's sports include baseball, basketball, cross country, football, golf, soccer, track and field and wrestling; women's sports include basketball, cross country, golf, soccer, track and field, volleyball and wrestling; and co-ed sports include cheerleading and eSports. Until 2018, Wayland Baptist was the only college in Texas to offer a wrestling program.

=== Football ===
On April 1, 2010, Wayland Baptist announced its intention to bring back the football program and join the Central States Football League (CSFL) in 2012. On December 8, 2010, the Pioneers introduced Jeff Lynn, former head coach of New Mexico Military Institute, as the first head coach in over 70 years. On April 24, 2011, Lynn stepped down from head coach because of family reasons. He would be replaced by former Lubbock Coronado High School coach Butch Henderson. The football team has competed in the Sooner Athletic Conference since the 2017–2018 season which was the first season the SAC added football. The Pioneers all-time record is 34–83, as of the 2023 season.

=== Cross country/track and field ===
The cross country and track and field program have won a total of 14 national championships. The programs compete at notable track meets and cross country events such as the Cowboy Jamboree, Texas Relays, Drake Relays, and the Michael Johnson Classic. In 2012, Wayland's men's track team won the NAIA National Championship by a margin of 38 points, which was the largest margin of victory in 23 years. Four Wayland athletes won individual championships, in addition to Wayland winning the 4x400 relay championship.

=== Women's basketball ===
Wayland's women's basketball program, The Hutcherson Flying Queens, has the distinction of being the winningest team in women's collegiate basketball history. On November 30, 2017, during the 2017–2018 season, the Flying Queens posted their 1,600th win, 300 plus more wins than any other women's collegiate basketball team in US history. By the end of the 2016–2017 season, Tennessee who leads all NCAA DI schools, had 1,252 wins, followed by Louisiana Tech with 1,199 and Connecticut with 1,118. Wayland had 1595.

The Wayland women's basketball team has also distinguished itself in the following ways:

- The Flying Queens are the only team in collegiate basketball history (men or women) to record a 131-game consecutive winning streak (1953–1958). In 2013, the 1953–58 teams were honored as "Trailblazers of the Game" by the Women's Basketball Hall of Fame for the 131 game-winning streak. The team is featured in a documentary entitled Flying Queens: A Basketball Dynasty, directed by Kellie Mitchell and produced by Aperture Art Productions.
- From the 1948–1949 season through 2017–2018 season the Flying Queens posted 1622 wins against 562 losses for a winning percentage of .743. In this 69-year period, the Wayland Team averaged 23 wins per season.
- The Wayland Team has won 19 National Championships.
- The Flying Queens' program has had eight individuals inducted into the Women's Basketball Hall of Fame in Knoxville, Tennessee.
- Members of the Wayland Hutcherson Flying Queens have received 212 All-American Awards from various organizations, excluding NAIA Scholar Athletes and a COSIDA Academic Award.

Since the 1948–1949 season, when Wayland began keeping official statistics on the Queens, the Wayland Team has had the following affiliations:

- AAU (Amateur Athletic Union): Between the 1948–1949 season through the 1976–1977 season, Wayland competed in AAU women's basketball and was one of only a few colleges to compete in this classification, as teams were primarily industrial and basically professional. The Wayland Team won 10 National AAU Championships, placed second nine times, and third three times. Wayland Team members received 88 AAU All-American Awards.
- NWIT (National Women's Invitational Tournament): The NWIT was initially sponsored by the Amarillo Chamber of Commerce. Wayland administrators had presented the idea to them because of Wayland's strong desire to have a national tournament limited to college teams. The NWIT was one of the first two national basketball tournaments for college women, coincidentally starting one day apart: the Commission on Intercollegiate Athletics for Women tournament held in West Chester, PA, March 20–24, 1969, and the NWIT in Amarillo, Texas, March 21–24, 1969. Wayland competed in the NWIT for 9 years (1969–1977), winning 9 consecutive NWIT National Championships and receiving 23 NWIT All-American Awards. The NWIT faded in prominence when the NCAA and NAIA assumed governance for women's basketball and was discontinued in 1996. In 1998, Triple Crown Sports resurrected the tournament as the Women's National Invitational Tournament (Women's NIT).
- AIAW (Association for Intercollegiate Athletics for Women): Wayland competed in the AIAW play-off structure for nine years, 1974–1982. During that period the team made it to the Final 4 three times finishing third in 1976 and fourth in 1978 and 1982. In both 1974 and 1975 they won the Consolation bracket.
- NAIA (National Association of Intercollegiate Athletics): The Wayland Team has competed in NAIA Division I basketball from 1983 through 2018. They have qualified for the National Tournament 25 times garnering 38 NAIA All-American Awards, one COSIDA Academic All American, and 39 NAIA Scholar-Athlete Awards.
- FIBA (International Basketball Federation): Between 1953 and 1975, Wayland was represented on all seven of FIBA's Women's World Championship Teams. Nineteen Flying Queens have played in FIBA World Championships.
- Pan American Games: Between 1955 and 1979, Wayland was represented on all seven USA Pan American teams. Twenty-seven Flying Queens competed in these games. Wayland coaches coached the USA's teams to first place victories in 1955 and 1959 and second place in 1971.
- USA All-Star Teams: Between 1958 and 1978, eighteen Flying Queens were selected for basketball tours that were part of the State Department's Intercultural Exchange Program to enhance relations between the United States and the Union of Soviet Socialist Republics. In 1959, eight Wayland players and a coach participated in the first women's basketball game ever to be played in Madison Square Garden. Russia won, 42–40. Also, to foster international goodwill, Wayland hosted national teams from Russia, The Republic of China, and Mexico on the Wayland's Plainview campus. Wayland teams made a number of trips to Mexico City to play both Mexican national teams and Mexican independent teams. Other Organizational Honors: In addition to the 149 All-American Awards previously mentioned, members of the Wayland Team garnered 63 other All-American Awards: Hanes Underalls (6); National Scouting Association (6); Street & Smith Preseason (9); Kodak (18); American Women's Sports Federation All Star Team (14); American Women's Sports Federation All American Freshman Team (7); and, JCPenney All-American Five (1).

The Wayland women's team has had 13 coaches:

1. Sam Allen (1947–1948 through 1950–1951; 1952–1953). Record: 71–28
2. Hank Garland (1951–1952). Record: 30–10
3. Caddo Matthews (1953–1954 through 1954–1955). Record: 52–0 (52 games of the 131 game winning streak)
4. Harley Redin (1955–1956 through 1972–1973). Record: 429–63 (79 games of the 131 game winning streak)
5. Dean Weese (1973–1974 through 1978–1979). Record: 190–30 (Left Wayland to coach the Dallas Diamonds in the Women's Professional Basketball League)
6. Cathy Wilson (1979–1980 through 1982–1983). Record: 80–50
7. Dave Ketterman (1983–1984 through December 1985–1986 season). Record: 65–17
8. Floyd Evans (January 1985 – 1986 through 1988–1989). Record: 106–21
9. Sheryl Estes (1989–1990 through 1995–1996). Record: 183–62
10. Johnna Pointer (1996–1997 through 2002–2003). Record: 151–84
11. Will Flemons (2003–2004 through 2006–2007). Record: 53–65
12. Tory Bryant (2007–2008 through 2012–2013). Record: 96–89
13. Alesha Robertson Ellis (2013–2014 through 2020–2021). Record: 187–52
14. Jason Cooper (2021-22 through present). Record: 54-15

The women's team also has a rich history. Wayland's first women's basketball game was in 1910–1911, the same year that Wayland opened for classes. Women played club sport basketball against high schools from the 1910–1911 season through the 1947–1948 season when the Wayland women's team played its first game against another college, beating Texas Tech. The Wayland Team played its first AAU competition in 1948–1949, which is also when Wayland began keeping official game statistics. The Wayland Team played its first International Competition in 1949–1950 against Mexico. Beginning with the 1950–1951 season, the Wayland Team became the first women's basketball team to fly to all away games, as Claude and Wilda Hutcherson, owners of Hutcherson Flying Service, picked up sponsorship of the team and flew the team to away games in Hutcherson Flying Service planes. This tradition of flying resulted in the team being named the "Hutcherson Flying Queens". In the early 1950s, Wayland became the first four-year collegiate program in history to provide 13 full scholarships annually to a women's collegiate team. [19, 20] The Wayland Team attracted 40 to 50 women to Plainview each year for tryouts.

The mascot for the women's team is the Flying Queens. The original team name was the Wayland Lassies, but in 1948, a local company, Harvest Queen Mill provided uniforms for the team, so they became the Harvest Queens. Before the 1950 season began, the team had a chance to play a game in Mexico City. A Wayland grad, Claude Hutcherson, was persuaded to fly the team to Mexico. Hutcherson became enamored with the team, and became a major sponsor, spending hundreds of thousands of dollars on the team. When Hutcherson Air Service became a full sponsor of the team, they began calling the team the Hutcherson Flying Queens. Hutcherson provided three sets of uniforms, plus traveling attire, and flew the team about 9,000 miles a year to games. To this day, Hutcherson Air Service continues to provide travel for the women's road games.

Ironically, the strong support of Claude Hutcherson created problems for the school. Wayland considered dropping the team because the scholarships threatened their accreditation. In 1961, the Wayland board of trustees voted unanimously to eliminate women's basketball. The school had difficulty funding the academic programs. The accrediting organization, the Southern Association of Colleges, was not interested in AAU championships. No plans were made to eliminate the men's scholarships, only the women's scholarships. The local citizens did not accept the decision. Local businessmen, under the leadership of Claude Hutcherson, raised money to privately fund scholarships for a year. The trustees voted to reverse their position.

The team was coached from 1955 to 1956 through 1972–1973 by Harley Redin. Redin served in the Marine Air Corp in WWII, logging 50 combat missions over the South Pacific. After the war, he became the athletic director of Wayland Baptist, and the coach of the men's basketball team. The men's teams were very successful, making the NAIA postseason tournament three separate years. However, he became the coach of the women's team in 1955, and was even more successful—in 1954, under Coach Caddo Matthews, they began a winning streak that would stretch to 131 games, including four consecutive AAU national championships. The winning streak would eclipse a prior winning streak of 102 games, held by Hanes Hosiery, which ended in 1954. For 18 years under the coaching leadership of Redin, the team won 431 games against only 66 losses. The team won six national AAU championships, and finished second six other times. Redin went on to coach the USA Women's Pan American Team in 1959 and 1971. He was inducted into the inaugural class of the Women's Basketball Hall of Fame in 1999. In 2018, the Naismith Basketball Hall of Fame presented Coach Redin the Bunn Lifetime Achievement award. Outside of enshrinement, this award is the most prestigious presented by the Hall of Fame. Wayland Baptist teams from 1946 to 1982 were later announced to receive enshrinement on April 6, 2019.

== Notable alumni ==
- Allison Black, U.S. Air Force officer
- Matt Brown, a football and track and field coach at Idalou High School, who is a gold and bronze winner in the Parapan American Games. He lost his left leg was amputated above the knee in an industrial accident in 2005.
- Michael E. Fortney, U.S. Air Force Major General
- Barry Loudermilk, U.S. Congressman for Georgia's 11th congressional district, 2015–present
- Tamyra Mensah-Stock, World Championship and Olympic gold medalist in freestyle wrestling.
- Devon Morris, former track and field athlete for Wayland Baptist University, ran for Jamaica in the 1988 Summer Olympics. Also, he won the IAAF indoor world championship with a 400 time of 45.49 sec.
- Marshall Nelson, basketball player
- Grady Nutt, Baptist preacher and humorist
- Lometa Odom, women's basketball player
- Brandon Schneider, current women's head basketball coach at The University of Kansas; previously at Stephen F. Austin State University and Emporia State University
- Marsha Sharp, former head coach of the Texas Tech Lady Raiders basketball team, graduated in 1974 from Wayland.

== See also ==
- Baptist General Convention of Texas
- List of state and other conventions associated with the Southern Baptist Convention
- List of Southern Baptist Convention affiliated people
