= Abernathy Independent School District =

School district in Texas

Location
- 505 7th St. Abernathy, Texas ESC Region 17 USA
- Coordinates: 33°49′49″N 101°50′43″W

District information
- Type: Independent school district
- Grades: Pre-K through 12
- Superintendent: Glen Teal
- Schools: 4 (2009-10)
- NCES District ID: 4807410

Students and staff
- Students: 785 (2010-11)
- Teachers: 68.85 (2009-10) (on full-time equivalent (FTE) basis)
- Student–teacher ratio: 11.75 (2009-10)
- Athletic conference: UIL Class 3A Football Division II
- District mascot: Antelopes
- Colors: Maroon, White

Other information
- TEA District Accountability Rating for 2011-12: Recognized
- Website: Abernathy ISD

The Abernathy Independent School District is a school district based in Abernathy, Texas (USA). The school operates three schools: Abernathy Elementary School, Abernathy Middle School, and Abernathy High School.

== Finances ==
As of the 2010–2011 school year, the appraised valuation of property in the district was $465,786,000. The maintenance tax rate was $0.116 and the bond tax rate was $0.034 per $100 of appraised valuation.

== Academic achievement ==
In 2011, the school district was rated "recognized" by the Texas Education Agency. Thirty-five percent of districts in Texas in 2011 received the same rating. No state accountability ratings will be given to districts in 2012. A school district in Texas can receive one of four possible rankings from the Texas Education Agency: Exemplary (the highest possible ranking), Recognized, Academically Acceptable, and Academically Unacceptable (the lowest possible ranking).

Historical district TEA accountability ratings

- 2011: Recognized
- 2010: Recognized
- 2009: Recognized
- 2008: Recognized
- 2007: Academically Acceptable
- 2006: Academically Acceptable
- 2005: Academically Acceptable
- 2004: Academically Acceptable

== Special programs ==
=== Athletics ===
Abernathy High School participates in the boys sports of baseball, basketball, football, and wrestling. The school participates in the girls sports of basketball and softball. Abernathy High School plays football in UIL Class 3A Division II.

== See also ==
- List of school districts in Texas
- List of high schools in Texas
