= Hale Center, Texas =

- City
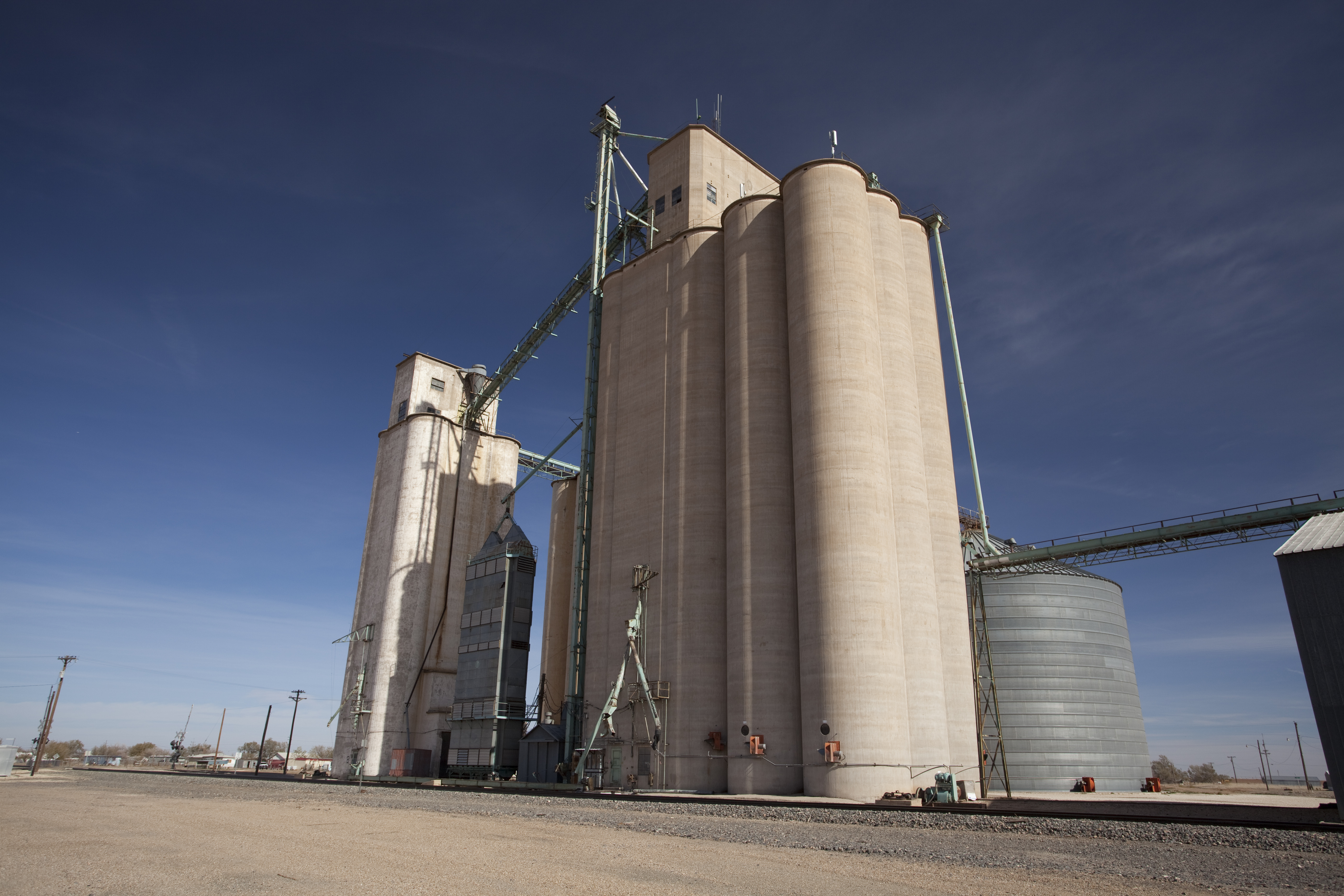
- Grain elevator in Hale Center

- Location within Texas
- Coordinates: 34°03′51″N 101°50′38″W
- Country: United States
- State: Texas
- County: Hale
- Region: Llano Estacado
- Established: 1893

Area
  - Total: 1.44 sq mi (3.72 km^{2})
  - Land: 1.44 sq mi (3.72 km^{2})
  - Water: 0 sq mi (0.00 km^{2})
- Elevation: 3,419 ft (1,042 m)

Population (2020)
  - Total: 2,062
  - Density: 1,429.8/sq mi (552.04/km^{2})
- Time zone: UTC-6 (CST)
- ZIP code: 79041
- Area code: 806
- FIPS code: 48-31820
- Website: www.cityofhalecenter.com

Hale Center is a city in Hale County, Texas, United States. The population was 2,062 at the 2020 census, down from 2,252 in 2010.

== History ==
Hale Center was founded in 1893 with the merger of two rival communities, Hale City and Epworth, both founded in 1891. Residents moved buildings to the new site. The new post office was named for the fact that the community is at the center of the county.

A tornado destroyed downtown Hale Center on June 2, 1965, including many businesses, city hall, and the fire station. Casualties included five dead and 60 injured, with $8 million in property damage.

== Geography ==
Hale Center lies on the high plains of the Llano Estacado at the intersection of Interstate 27 and Farm to Market Road 1914, in central Hale County. The community is located 11 mi (18 km) to the southwest of the county seat of Plainview and about 33 mi (53 km) north of Lubbock.

According to the United States Census Bureau, the city has a total area of 1.1 square miles (2.8 km^{2}), all land.

=== Climate ===
According to the Köppen climate classification system, Hale Center has a semiarid climate, BSk on climate maps.

== Demographics ==
Historical population
Census	Pop.	Note	%±
1930	1,007		—
1940	836		−17.0%
1950	1,626		94.5%
1960	2,196		35.1%
1970	1,964		−10.6%
1980	2,297		17.0%
1990	2,067		−10.0%
2000	2,263		9.5%
2010	2,252		−0.5%
2020	2,062		−8.4%
U.S. Decennial Census

=== 2020 census ===
As of the 2020 census, Hale Center had a population of 2,062, 733 households, and 529 families residing in the city. The median age was 36.7 years; 27.1% of residents were under the age of 18 and 15.7% of residents were 65 years of age or older. For every 100 females there were 100.4 males, and for every 100 females age 18 and over there were 94.1 males age 18 and over.

0.0% of residents lived in urban areas, while 100.0% lived in rural areas.

There were 733 households in Hale Center, of which 36.2% had children under the age of 18 living in them. Of all households, 47.3% were married-couple households, 18.8% were households with a male householder and no spouse or partner present, and 27.8% were households with a female householder and no spouse or partner present. About 24.0% of all households were made up of individuals and 10.9% had someone living alone who was 65 years of age or older.

There were 861 housing units, of which 14.9% were vacant. The homeowner vacancy rate was 1.2% and the rental vacancy rate was 8.1%.

Hale Center racial composition (NH = Non-Hispanic) (Note: Note: the US Census treats Hispanic/Latino as an ethnic category. This table excludes Latinos from the racial categories and assigns them to a separate category. Hispanics/Latinos can be of any race.)
Race	Number	Percentage
White (NH)	595	28.86%
Black or African American (NH)	29	1.41%
Native American or Alaska Native (NH)	9	0.44%
Asian (NH)	5	0.24%
Pacific Islander (NH)	1	0.05%
Some Other Race (NH)	3	0.15%
Mixed/Multi-Racial (NH)	49	2.38%
Hispanic or Latino	1,371	66.49%
Total	2,062	

=== 2010 census ===
At the 2010 census, 2,252 people, 763 households and 568 families resided in the city. The population density was 2,047.3 inhabitants per square mile (790.5/km^{2}). The 867 housing units averaged 788.2 per square mile (309.6/km^{2}). The racial makeup of the city was 69.9% White, 4.2% African American, 0.7% Native American, 0.0% Asian, 0.1% from other races, and 2.0% from two or more races. Hispanics or Latinos of any race were 63.2% of the population.

Of the 763 households, 34.5% had children under the age of 18 living with them, 54.5% were married couples living together, 14.3% had a female householder with no husband present, and 25.6% were not families. About 22.5% of all households were made up of individuals, and 12.5% had someone living alone who was 65 years of age or older. The average household size was 2.9 and the average family size was 3.41.

The population was distributed as 31.0% under the age of 18, 53.8% aged 18–64 years old, and 15.2% were 65 years of age and older. The median age was 33.9 years. The population is 48.5% male, and 51.5% female. The median household income was $30,337. The poverty rate was 25.7%.

== Education ==
Hale Center is served by the Hale Center Independent School District and is home to the Hale Center Owls.

== See also ==
- Llano Estacado
- List of ghost towns in Texas
- Running Water Draw
- Yellow House Draw
- Blackwater Draw
- White River (Texas)
