= Plainview Independent School District =

School district in Texas

Plainview Independent School District is a public school district based in Plainview, Texas (USA).

In addition to Plainview, the district also serves the town of Edmonson and the community of Seth Ward. Located mostly in Hale County, a small portion of the district extends into neighboring Floyd County.

In 2009, the school district was rated "academically acceptable" by the Texas Education Agency.

== Demographics ==
As of 2008 72% of the district's students were Hispanic and Latino. From 1980 to 2008 the population of Hispanics and Latinos, especially that of Hispanic and Latino children, had increased dramatically.

== Bilingual education ==
As of 2008 Plainview ISD stated that 9% of its students were limited English proficient (LEP); the school district made efforts to move students out of bilingual education in grades 1 and 2. School districts in Texas with demographics similar to that of Plainview often report 25% of their students are LEP. In 2006 27% of parents opted not to have bilingual services for their students. In the district two elementary schools have bilingual education for all grades; three offer bilingual education for some, but not all, grades; and one elementary school has no bilingual education at all; this means some students may have to attend a different elementary school in order to complete bilingual education. Superintendent Ron Miller stated that due to Plainview's rural location it was especially difficult for the district to hire bilingual-certified teachers.

== Dropout rate ==
In 2008 Hispanics and Latinos made up most of the high school dropouts in Plainview and the four-year high school dropout rate of Plainview High was almost two times larger than the average in Texas. Miller stated in 2008 that he did not believe that the setup of Plainview ISD bilingual programs in elementary grades contributed to the high school dropout rates.

== Schools ==
=== High Schools ===
- Plainview High School (Grades 9-12)
- Plainview Collegiate High School (Grades 9-12)
- Ash Program (Grades 10-12)

=== Middle Schools ===
- Plainview Intermediate (Grades 5-6)
- Plainview Junior High School (Grades 7-8)

=== Elementary schools ===
- Plainview Early Learning Center (Grades 3k- 1)
- Plainview North Elementary (Grades 2-4)
- Plainview Central Elementary (Grades 2-4)
