= Taxpayer-funded lobbying =

Taxpayer-funded lobbying is the practice of using funds that come directly or indirectly from taxpayers for political lobbying purposes. Taxpayer-funded lobbying is one government lobbying another. Essentially taxpayer-funded lobbying is when tax dollars are used to pay lobbyists to go to state or federal legislatures to ask for more tax dollars. "In other words, it's one arm of government trying to influence another arm of government, usually in a publicly funded quest for more money or power."

== United States ==
=== Variants ===
There are several variations of taxpayer-funded lobbying found in the United States. One variant is where state-level government agencies use public funds to retain lobbyists to lobby the state or federal legislature. Another form of taxpayer-funded lobbying occurs when local political subdivisions of the state use public funds to lobby the state or federal government.

==== State-level agency ====
Publicly funded lobbying by state-level agencies is the use of public funds by a state agency to represent the agency's interests to their legislature.

==== Local political subdivisions ====
Taxpayer-funded lobbying by local political subdivisions can take two main forms: direct and association. In the first type, local political subdivisions of the state, such as, cities, counties, and school districts, use public funds to contract directly with a lobbyist to lobby on their behalf at the state or federal legislature. The second and most common form of taxpayer-funded lobbying by local political subdivisions occurs through associations of similarly situated governmental entities such as the National League of Cities, National Association of Counties, or the National School Boards Association and the various state level affiliates of these types of associations, who collect tax-funded dues to lobby state and federal legislatures on behalf of their members.

=== Restrictions ===
Lobbyists on behalf of state and local governments who lobby the federal government are subject to the registration requirements under the Lobbyist Disclosure Act. Individual states issue their own rules that often restrict using state funds for lobbying purposes.

=== By state ===
==== California ====
In the 2007–2008 legislative season around $92 million, 17% of all lobbying dollars spent in California, were spent by taxpayer-funded entities.

In 2021 the City of San Diego allotted $840,000 for 4 years worth of lobbying on state and federal issues.

==== Texas ====
In 2017 around $41 million, 11% of all lobbying dollars spent in Texas, were spent by taxpayer-funded entities. In 2020, the City of Austin spent $435,000–$824,000 lobbying other governments for money. The people of Texas want to end taxpayer funded lobbying. They claim that the groups turn around and instead of using that money for schools and the Texas Municipal League, they use it for lobbying the legislature for more spending money.

The Texas GOP established the abolishment of taxpayer-funded lobbying as a legislative goal for the 2019 legislative session.

In a 2019 poll, 91% of Texans opposed taxpayer-funded lobbying. In the March 2020 primary election, 94% of Republican voters approved of a non-binding proposition to ban taxpayer-funded lobbying.

In 2025, just two weeks to go in the biennial session of the Texas Legislature, lawmakers in Austin still have much remaining business to tend to. Governor Greg Abbott (R) and many legislators, however, have already accomplished their top priority for the session by enacting legislation, which Governor Abbott signed last week, creating an education savings account (ESA) program that will provide an estimated 100,000 children with school choice next year.

===== Efforts to ban taxpayer-funded lobbying in Texas =====
====== Early efforts ======
A concerted legislative effort to ban taxpayer-funded Lobbying began as early as 2015. During the 84th Legislative Session, House Bill 1257, authored by State Representative Matt Shaheen, and Senate Bill 711 by State Senator Konni Burton, would have banned the use of public funds by political subdivisions of the state to directly or indirectly influence or attempt to influence the outcome of matters pending before the legislature. Neither bill advanced from either chamber of the Texas Legislature during that session. A similar measure did not advance during the following Legislative Session in 2017.

====== 2019 Legislative Session: Senate Bill 29/House Bill 281 ======
Measures to ban taxpayer-funded lobbying moved further through the legislative process during the 86th Legislative Session of the Texas Legislature. Senate Bill 29 authored by State Senator Bob Hall advanced from the Texas Senate and was sponsored in the Texas House of Representatives by State Representative Mayes Middleton. Senate Bill 29 failed to pass to Third Reading in the Texas House of Representatives by a vote of 58 Ayes, 85 Nays, and 2 Present Not Voting. Despite support from a majority of Republicans in the Texas House of Representatives, a minority of Republicans joined a majority of Democrats to defeat the bill in this vote.

====== 2021 Legislative Session ======
The latest iteration of this measure was introduced December 7, 2020 in the Texas House of Representatives by State Representative Mayes Middleton as House Bill 749. On December 8, 2020, State Senator Bob Hall filed an identical bill as Senate Bill 234 in the Texas Senate.

==== New Jersey ====
In 2010, Sussex, Warren, Morris, and Hunterdon counties all voted to withhold dues from the New Jersey Association of Counties, a taxpayer-funded lobbying ground, when it emerged that its employees had been included in the state's already troubled pension system.

==== Illinois ====
In 2009 Illinois taxpayers funded $6.4 million worth of lobbying other governments.

In 2020, the State-regulated near-monopoly utility ComEd was caught up in a federal investigation regarding the use of taxpayer funds to pay for no-show lobbying jobs for the allies of the previously all-power ex-State House Speaker Michael Madigan. Madigan's son-in-law was hired as the chief lobbyist by the Chicago metro's Regional Transportation Authority.

==== Oregon ====
Public agencies in Oregon used about $3.7 million in taxpayer money for government-to-government lobbying in 2009 and 2011.

== European Union ==
A large number of United Kingdom local governments have spent money lobbying Brussels for intervention and funding.

== See also ==
- Activism
- Advocacy group
- Bribery
- Campaign finance
- Client politics
- Fossil fuels lobby
- Issue versus express advocacy
- Lobby register
- Money loop
- Monetary influence of Jack Abramoff
- Outline of public affairs
- Pharmaceutical lobby
