= Plainview, Texas =

- City
- Main entrance of Plainview City Hall

- Location of Plainview, Texas

- Location in the United States
- Coordinates: 34°11′5.26″N 101°42′24.63″W
- Country: United States
- State: Texas
- County: Hale
- Founded: 1887
- Incorporated: January 1, 1907

Government
  - Type: Council-Manager
  - Mayor: Charles Starnes
  - City manager: Ted Chancellor
  - City Council: Dist 1 Rep: Mary Elizabeth Dickerson; Dist 2 Rep: Larry Williams; Dist 3 Rep: Gilbert Garcia; Dist 4 Rep: Gary House; Dist 5 Rep: Daniel Rascon; Dist 6 Rep: Evan Weiss; Dist 7 Rep: Lorie Rodriguez

Area
  - Total: 13.895 sq mi (35.988 km^{2})
  - Land: 13.895 sq mi (35.988 km^{2})
  - Water: 0 sq mi (0.000 km^{2})
- Elevation: 3,363 ft (1,025 m)

Population (2020)
  - Total: 20,187
  - Estimate (2023): 19,420
  - Density: 1,397.6/sq mi (539.61/km^{2})
- Time zone: UTC−6 (Central (CST))
  - Summer (DST): UTC−5 (CDT)
- ZIP Codes: 79072, 79073
- Area code: 806
- FIPS code: 48-57980
- GNIS feature ID: 1365375
- Sales tax: 8.25%
- Website: plainviewtx.org

Plainview is a city in and the county seat of Hale County, Texas, United States. The population was 20,187 at the 2020 census. The town is home to Wayland Baptist University. The Downtown Plainview Commercial Historic District is a business center for the high plains regions, with cafes and parks.

== History ==
Plainview began when Z. T. Maxwell and Edwin Lowden Lowe established a post office on March 18, 1887. The town received its name due to the vast treeless plain surrounding it. On July 3, 1888, the town received a charter, and it became the county seat in August the same year, when Hale County was organized.

In 1906, the Pecos and Northern Texas Railway reached Plainview, initiating an agricultural boom in the region. The city incorporated in 1907, and by 1910, it had almost 3,000 residents, earning the nickname "Athens of West Texas." Central Plains College and Conservatory of Music, later renamed Seth Ward College, was founded in 1907, and Wayland Baptist College (now Wayland Baptist University) was established in 1909.

In 1962, the Atomitat, an underground home and bunker, was built in Plainview.

In 1969, country singer Jimmy Dean opened the Jimmy Dean Meat Company, and in 1971, Missouri Beef Packers established a large beef-processing plant.

== Geography ==
Plainview is located at 34°11′5.26″N 101°42′24.63″W (34.1847936, -101.7068417) on the Llano Estacado.

According to the United States Census Bureau, the city has a total area of 13.895 square miles (35.99 km^{2}), all land.

=== Climate ===
According to the Köppen climate classification, Plainview has a semiarid climate, BSk on climate maps.

Climate data for Plainview, Texas (1991–2020 normals, extremes 1908–present)
Month	Jan	Feb	Mar	Apr	May	Jun	Jul	Aug	Sep	Oct	Nov	Dec	Year
Record high °F (°C)	84 (29)	89 (32)	98 (37)	102 (39)	108 (42)	112 (44)	110 (43)	108 (42)	102 (39)	99 (37)	90 (32)	82 (28)	112 (44)
Mean maximum °F (°C)	73.4 (23.0)	77.6 (25.3)	85.0 (29.4)	90.3 (32.4)	97.4 (36.3)	101.9 (38.8)	100.7 (38.2)	99.2 (37.3)	96.0 (35.6)	90.4 (32.4)	80.7 (27.1)	73.0 (22.8)	104.4 (40.2)
Mean daily maximum °F (°C)	52.3 (11.3)	56.7 (13.7)	65.1 (18.4)	73.4 (23.0)	81.8 (27.7)	90.2 (32.3)	92.4 (33.6)	91.0 (32.8)	83.8 (28.8)	74.0 (23.3)	61.8 (16.6)	52.8 (11.6)	72.9 (22.7)
Daily mean °F (°C)	39.2 (4.0)	42.8 (6.0)	50.7 (10.4)	58.7 (14.8)	68.3 (20.2)	77.1 (25.1)	80.1 (26.7)	78.7 (25.9)	71.3 (21.8)	60.3 (15.7)	48.5 (9.2)	40.2 (4.6)	59.7 (15.4)
Mean daily minimum °F (°C)	26.1 (−3.3)	28.9 (−1.7)	36.3 (2.4)	43.9 (6.6)	54.7 (12.6)	64.1 (17.8)	67.9 (19.9)	66.3 (19.1)	58.8 (14.9)	46.7 (8.2)	35.1 (1.7)	27.6 (−2.4)	46.4 (8.0)
Mean minimum °F (°C)	12.0 (−11.1)	14.8 (−9.6)	20.0 (−6.7)	30.2 (−1.0)	40.7 (4.8)	54.5 (12.5)	61.3 (16.3)	59.6 (15.3)	46.4 (8.0)	31.3 (−0.4)	19.8 (−6.8)	12.7 (−10.7)	7.2 (−13.8)
Record low °F (°C)	−7 (−22)	−8 (−22)	−2 (−19)	15 (−9)	24 (−4)	39 (4)	50 (10)	45 (7)	33 (1)	17 (−8)	3 (−16)	−5 (−21)	−8 (−22)
Average precipitation inches (mm)	0.68 (17)	0.60 (15)	1.25 (32)	1.52 (39)	2.86 (73)	2.74 (70)	2.38 (60)	2.12 (54)	1.99 (51)	1.63 (41)	0.83 (21)	0.73 (19)	19.33 (491)
Average snowfall inches (cm)	2.1 (5.3)	1.5 (3.8)	0.8 (2.0)	0.1 (0.25)	0.0 (0.0)	0.0 (0.0)	0.0 (0.0)	0.0 (0.0)	0.0 (0.0)	0.1 (0.25)	1.2 (3.0)	2.4 (6.1)	8.2 (21)
Average precipitation days (≥ 0.01 in)	3.3	3.7	4.5	4.7	7.1	7.5	5.9	6.7	6.1	5.3	3.6	3.7	62.1
Average snowy days (≥ 0.1 in)	1.3	1.3	0.7	0.1	0.0	0.0	0.0	0.0	0.0	0.1	0.6	1.3	5.4
Source: NOAA

== Demographics ==
Historical population
Census	Pop.	Note	%±
1910	2,829		—
1920	3,989		41.0%
1930	8,834		121.5%
1940	8,263		−6.5%
1950	14,044		70.0%
1960	18,735		33.4%
1970	19,096		1.9%
1980	22,187		16.2%
1990	21,700		−2.2%
2000	22,336		2.9%
2010	22,194		−0.6%
2020	20,187		−9.0%
2023 (est.)	19,420		−3.8%
U.S. Decennial Census; Texas Almanac: 1850-2000; 2020 Census

As of the 2023 American Community Survey, there are 6,998 estimated households in Plainview with an average of 2.75 persons per household. The city has a median household income of $45,991. Approximately 22.7% of the city's population lives at or below the poverty line. Plainview has an estimated 63.8% employment rate, with 15.7% of the population holding a bachelor's degree or higher and 74.8% holding a high school diploma.

The top five reported ancestries (people were allowed to report up to two ancestries, thus the figures will generally add to more than 100%) were English (61.8%), Spanish (36.9%), Indo-European (0.8%), Asian and Pacific Islander (0.1%), and Other (0.4%).

The median age in the city was 32.0 years.

=== Racial and ethnic composition ===
Plainview, Texas – racial and ethnic composition Note: the US Census treats Hispanic/Latino as an ethnic category. This table excludes Latinos from the racial categories and assigns them to a separate category. Hispanics/Latinos may be of any race.
Race / ethnicity (NH = non-Hispanic)	Pop. 2000	Pop. 2010	Pop. 2020	% 2000	% 2010	% 2020
White alone (NH)	9,580	7,513	5,579	42.89%	33.85%	27.64%
Black or African American alone (NH)	1,262	1,077	934	5.65%	4.85%	4.63%
Native American or Alaska Native alone (NH)	91	65	71	0.41%	0.29%	0.35%
Asian alone (NH)	93	107	115	0.42%	0.48%	0.57%
Pacific Islander alone (NH)	7	18	25	0.03%	0.08%	0.12%
Other race alone (NH)	14	24	40	0.06%	0.11%	0.20%
Mixed race or multiracial (NH)	158	169	377	0.71%	0.76%	1.87%
Hispanic or Latino (any race)	11,131	13,221	13,046	49.83%	59.57%	64.63%
Total	22,336	22,194	20,187	100.00%	100.00%	100.00%

=== 2020 census ===
As of the 2020 census, there were 20,187 people, 7,418 households, and 5,024 families residing in the city. The population density was 1,452.8 inhabitants per square mile (560.9/km^{2}), and there were 8,549 housing units at an average density of 615.3 per square mile (237.6/km^{2}).

The median age was 34.8 years, 27.5% of residents were under the age of 18, and 15.3% were 65 years of age or older. For every 100 females there were 93.3 males, and for every 100 females age 18 and over there were 89.7 males.

98.0% of residents lived in urban areas, while 2.0% lived in rural areas.

Of all households, 45.2% were married-couple households, 17.8% had a male householder with no spouse or partner present, and 30.9% had a female householder with no spouse or partner present; 36.2% had children under the age of 18 living in them. About 28.0% of all households were made up of individuals and 12.3% had someone living alone who was 65 years of age or older.

Of the 8,549 housing units, 13.2% were vacant. The homeowner vacancy rate was 2.2% and the rental vacancy rate was 12.0%.

Racial composition as of the 2020 census
Race	Number	Percent
White	9,852	48.8%
Black or African American	1,017	5.0%
American Indian and Alaska Native	225	1.1%
Asian	119	0.6%
Native Hawaiian and Other Pacific Islander	25	0.1%
Some other race	4,733	23.4%
Two or more races	4,216	20.9%
Hispanic or Latino (of any race)	13,046	64.6%

=== 2010 census ===
As of the 2010 census, there were 22,194 people, 7,605 households, and _ families residing in the city. The population density was 1,608.7 inhabitants per square mile (621.1/km^{2}). There were 8,536 housing units at an average density of 618.6 per square mile (238.8/km^{2}). The racial makeup of the city was 68.54% White, 5.19% African American, 1.07% Native American, 0.49% Asian, 0.09% Pacific Islander, 20.97% from some other races and 3.65% from two or more races. Hispanic or Latino people of any race were 59.57% of the population.

=== 2000 census ===
As of the 2000 census, there were 22,336 people, 7,626 households, and 5,666 families residing in the city. The population density was 1,621.0 inhabitants per square mile (625.9/km^{2}). There were 8,471 housing units at an average density of 614.8 per square mile (237.4/km^{2}). The racial makeup of the city was 63.21% White, 5.87% African American, 1.13% Native American, 0.43% Asian, 0.00% Pacific Islander, 26.59% from some other races and 2.77% from two or more races. Hispanic or Latino people of any race were 49.83% of the population.

Of the 7,626 households, 40.1% had children under 18 living with them, 57.2% were married couples living together, 13.0% had a female householder with no husband present, and 25.7% were not families. About 22.7% of all households were composed of single individuals, and 11.2% were households of persons 65 years of age or older living alone. The average household size was 2.82, and the average family size was four.

In the city, the age distribution was 31.0% under 18, 11.5% from 18 to 24, 26.0% from 25 to 44, 18.0% from 45 to 64, and 13.5% who were 65 older. The median age was 31 years. For every 100 females, there were 91.7 males. For every 100 females 18 and over, there were 86.7 males.

The median income per household was $31,551, and per family was $35,215. Males had a median income of $26,434 versus $19,888 for females. The per capita income for the city was $13,791. About 15.0% of families and 19.1% of the population were below the poverty line, including 25.1% of those under 18, and 14.8% of those 65 or over.

== Economy ==
The local economy has traditionally been very agricultural. The surrounding area is well known for its dominant cotton production. Additionally, Livestock is a significant contributor to farm sales. Major employers in the city include the Walmart Distribution Center, Azteca Corn Milling, Covenant Hospital, Wayland Baptist University and Plainview ISD.

In 2009, the Texas Department of State Health Services ordered the recall of all products produced by a processing facility near Plainview owned by Peanut Corporation of America. Rodents, excrement, and feathers in the plant had been found in the facility's products. The closure was not related to closures of PCA plants due to Salmonella concerns.

A Cargill beef processing plant, then the largest employer in the city, closed in 2013 due to lack of incoming animals, a result of the 2010–2012 drought. The closure created challenges for the city, as an estimated 2,300 employees and their families relocated.

== Government ==
The Texas Department of Criminal Justice Region V office is located in Plainview. The current Region V headquarters opened in 1996 in a former Bank of America building.

== Education ==
The city is served by the Plainview Independent School District, which enrolled 5,585 students as of 2018. The district attracts transfer students from surrounding school districts. Due to the PISD's size compared to surrounding districts, many of the district's schools provide extensive support for disabled students and students with special needs not available at other schools outside the district, in addition to more specialized courses. The mascot for the Plainview High School is a grey English Bulldog nicknamed "Big Red".

Wayland Baptist University, a private, four-year, coeducational, Baptist university, is based in the city. In 1908, when the school was founded, the campus was more than a mile from the city limit. The Museum of the Llano Estacado, now the Mabee Regional Heritage Center, opened in 1976, is located on the university grounds. The museum is home to a permanent exhibit featuring artifacts from the Plainview Site, and fossilized remains of a Columbian mammoth known as the "Imperial Mammoth". The Mabee Regional Heritage Center includes the Jimmy Dean, Llano of the Estacado and Flying Queens museums.

An extension of South Plains College serves the residents of the city.

== Media ==
The Plainview Herald, formerly the Plainview Daily Herald, is the city's only remaining newspaper. It was acquired from local owners by Hearst Communications in 1979. It is among the oldest newspapers in Texas still in publication, and became fully computer paginated in 1994, the same year it began publishing an online edition. Customers in the city are also served by the Lubbock Avalanche-Journal, which often reports on news from Plainview.

Eight radio stations broadcast from the city, including KVOP, among the oldest in the region. KVOP's call sign originally meant "Voice of Plainview".

The city is within the Lubbock television market. Due to the terrain, television stations based in Amarillo can be received over-the-air, either directly or via repeaters north of the city. Prior to 1993, virtually all stations broadcast from Lubbock and Amarillo markets were retransmitted by the local cable operator. After changes were made to must-carry rules by the Federal Communications Commission, only stations from Lubbock are available to cable and digital satellite customers in the city.

The Steve Martin film Leap of Faith (1992) was filmed in and around Plainview. Several residents were hired as extras for the film. Until 2016, a water tower east of downtown bore the name and mascot of the fictional town on which the movie was set: Rustwater Bengals.

An episode of Vice portrayed the city's plight as it faces the consequences of increasing drought caused by global warming in a documentary feature called "Deliver Us from Drought". The documentary featured numerous locations, many of which had been closed or abandoned for years prior, as examples of recent rural flight following a drought. The documentary followed the template of a similar short, "Dry and Drier in West Texas", which was broadcast on Showtime. Both documentaries portrayed residents of the city as excessively religious.

== Transportation ==
Plainview is at the intersection of Interstate Highway 27, U.S. highways 87 and 70, and State Highway 194.

== Notable people ==
- Jodey Arrington, U.S. representative for Texas
- James H. Clark, founder of Silicon Graphics, Netscape, and other companies
- Jimmy Dean, singer, actor, and entrepreneur, host of The Jimmy Dean Show
- Bob Dorough, bebop and cool jazz pianist
- Michael Egnew, former player for the Miami Dolphins
- Leonard Garcia, retired professional mixed martial artist.
- Todrick Hall, YouTube personality, singer, and Broadway actor
- Don January, professional golfer
- Harrison Keller, President of the University of North Texas since 2024
- Jim Landtroop, former member of Texas House of Representatives
- Pete Laney, former speaker of the Texas House of Representatives
- Emily Jones McCoy, former reporter for KCBD and Fox Sports Networks
- Lawrence McCutcheon, former player for the Los Angeles Rams
- Carl Nafzger, Thoroughbred trainer of Derby winner Unbridled and 1990 Breeders' Cup
- Ray Poage, former player for the Minnesota Vikings
- Lavern Roach, professional boxer
- Jerry Sisemore, American former professional football player who was an offensive lineman for 12 seasons in the National Football League (NFL) for the Philadelphia Eagles from 1973 to 1984.
- String-A-Longs, Popular group most famous for their hit recording of "Wheels"
- Julius Waring Walker, Jr., former U.S. ambassador to Burkina Faso
- Jamar Wall, player with Calgary Stampeders (CFL)
- James Henry Wayland, physician, founder of Wayland Baptist University
