= Lubbock–Plainview combined statistical area =

Lubbock metropolitan area
- Combined Statistical Area
- Lubbock–Plainview, TX CSA
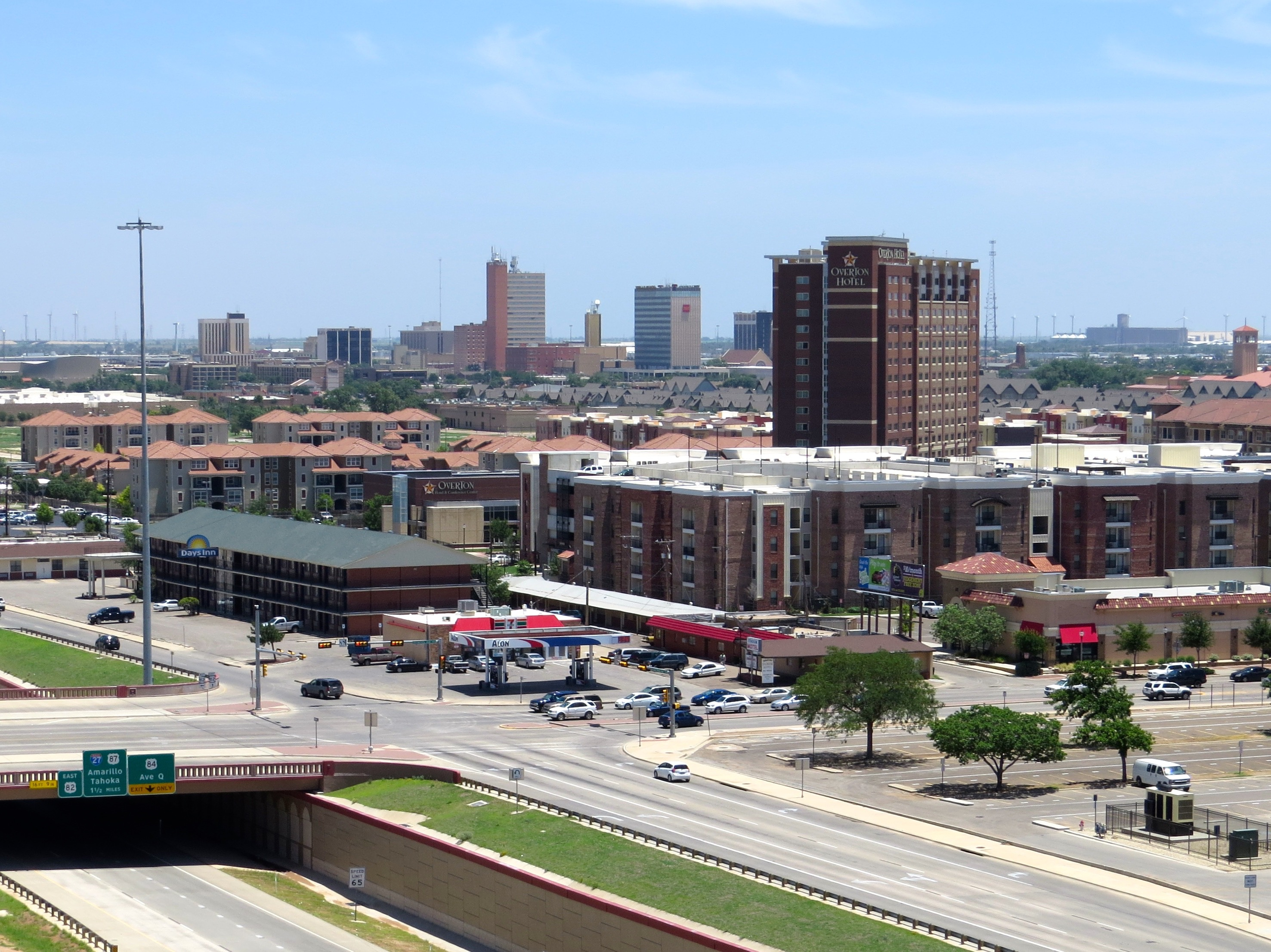
- Downtown Lubbock in 2013
Interactive map of Lubbock–Plainview, TX CSA
City of Lubbock
Lubbock, TX MSA
Plainview, TX µSA
- Country: United States
- State: Texas
- Largest city: Lubbock
- Other cities: Levelland; Slaton; Tahoka; Crosbyton; Plainview

Population
  - Total: 322,257
  - Rank: 157 in the U.S.
- Time zone: UTC-6 (CST)
  - Summer (DST): UTC-5 (CDT)

The Lubbock–Plainview Combined Statistical Area consists of the Lubbock Metropolitan Area and the Plainview Micropolitan Area and comprises eight counties: (Cochran, Crosby, Floyd, Garza, Hale, Hockley, Lynn, and Lubbock) in the South Plains region of west Texas. The Levelland Micropolitan Statistical Area was a separate statistical area within the CSA until 2023 when it was added to the Lubbock MSA. In the 2010 census, the CSA had a population of 350,013, though a July 1, 2019 estimate placed the population at 381,664. The CSA's principal city is Lubbock.

== Counties ==
- Cochran
- Crosby
- Floyd
- Garza
- Hale
- Hockley
- Lynn
- Lubbock

== Communities ==
=== Places with more than 150,000 people ===
- Lubbock (Principal city)

=== Places with 15,000 to 25,000 people ===
- Plainview

=== Places with 5,000 to 15,000 people ===
- Levelland
- Slaton
- Wolfforth

=== Places with 1,000 to 5,000 people ===
- Abernathy
- Anton
- Crosbyton
- Hale Center
- Idalou
- Lorenzo
- Petersburg
- Ralls
- Ransom Canyon
- Shallowater
- Sundown
- Tahoka

=== Places with less than 1,000 people ===
- Buffalo Springs
- New Deal
- New Home
- O'Donnell
- Opdyke West
- Reese Center
- Ropesville
- Smyer
- Wilson

=== Unincorporated places ===
- Acuff
- Cone
- Cotton Center
- Grassland
- Roosevelt
- Slide
- Wayside
- Whitharral
- Woodrow

=== Ghost town ===
- Hale City

== Demographics ==
As of the census of 2000, there were 272,416 people, 103,022 households, and 68,092 families residing within the CSA. The racial makeup of the CSA was 74.03% White, 7.24% African American, 0.60% Native American, 1.17% Asian, 0.04% Pacific Islander, 14.94% from other races, and 1.98% from two or more races. Hispanic or Latino of any race were 28.83% of the population.

The median income for a household in the CSA was $29,684 and the median income for a family was $35,415. Males had a median income of $27,824 versus $19,830 for females. The per capita income for the CSA was $15,597.

== See also ==
- List of cities in Texas
- Texas census statistical areas
- List of Texas metropolitan areas
