= Wayside =

Wayside may refer to:

- Wayobjects, trackside objects
- Wayside (band), an early version of As Friends Rust
- Wayside Restaurant, an eatery in Vermont, USA
- The Wayside School franchise:
  - Wayside (book), 1978 children's book written by Louis Sachar.
  - Wayside: The Movie, 2005 animated film loosely based on the original book.
  - Wayside (TV series), 2007 animated television series that follows up on the 2005 film.
- A rest area

== Places ==
United States

- Wayside, Georgia
- Wayside, Kansas
- Wayside, Mississippi
- Wayside, New Jersey
- The Wayside, Concord, Massachusetts
- In Texas:
  - Wayside, Lynn County, Texas
  - Wayside, Roberts County, Texas
  - Wayside, Armstrong County, Texas
- Wayside, West Virginia
- Wayside, Wisconsin

== See also ==
- Sideways (disambiguation)
- Wayside horns at railroad crossings
- Wayside marker
