= Wayside, Texas =

Wayside, Texas may refer to any of the following unincorporated communities:

- Wayside, Lynn County, Texas
- Wayside, Roberts County, Texas
- Wayside, Armstrong County, Texas
