= Pampa micropolitan area =

- Micropolitan Statistical Area
- Pampa, TX μSA
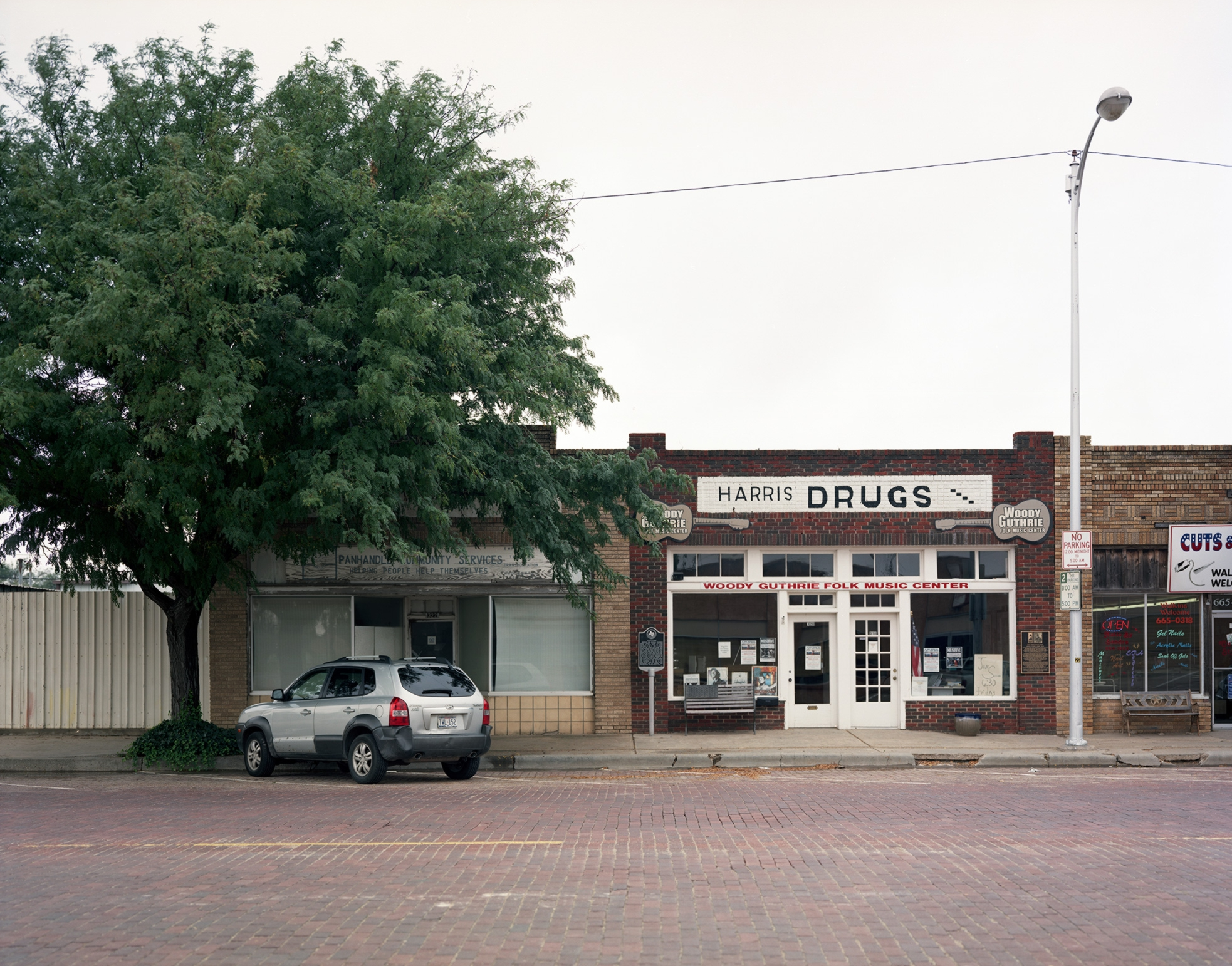
- Pampa business district
Interactive map of Pampa, TX μSA
City of Pampa
Pampa, TX μSA
- Coordinates: 35°37′11″N 100°48′47″W
- Country: United States
- State: Texas
- Largest city: Pampa
- Time zone: UTC-6 (CST)
  - Summer (DST): UTC-5 (CDT)

The Pampa micropolitan [statistical] area is a micropolitan area in the Texas Panhandle that covers two counties – Gray and Roberts. As of the 2000 census, the region had a population of 23,631 (though a July 1, 2009, estimate placed the population at 22,952).

== Counties ==
- Gray
- Roberts

== Communities ==
- Alanreed (unincorporated)
- Lefors
- McLean
- Miami
- Pampa (principal city)
- Hoover (unincorporated)
- Wayside (unincorporated)

== Demographics ==
As of the census of 2000, there were 23,631 people, 9,155 households, and 6,324 families residing around Pampa. The racial makeup of the area was 82.69% White, 5.64% African American, 0.93% Native American, 0.38% Asian, 0.02% Pacific Islander, 7.97% from other races, and 2.37% from two or more races. Hispanic or Latino of any race were 12.64% of the population.

The median income for a household in the region was $38,080 and the median income for a family was $45,210. Males had a median income of $32,763 versus $21,885 for females. The per capita income for the Pampa micropolitan area was $18,813.

== See also ==
- List of cities in Texas
- Texas census statistical areas
- List of Texas metropolitan areas
