= Lubbock metropolitan area =

- Metropolitan statistical area
- Lubbock, TX MSA
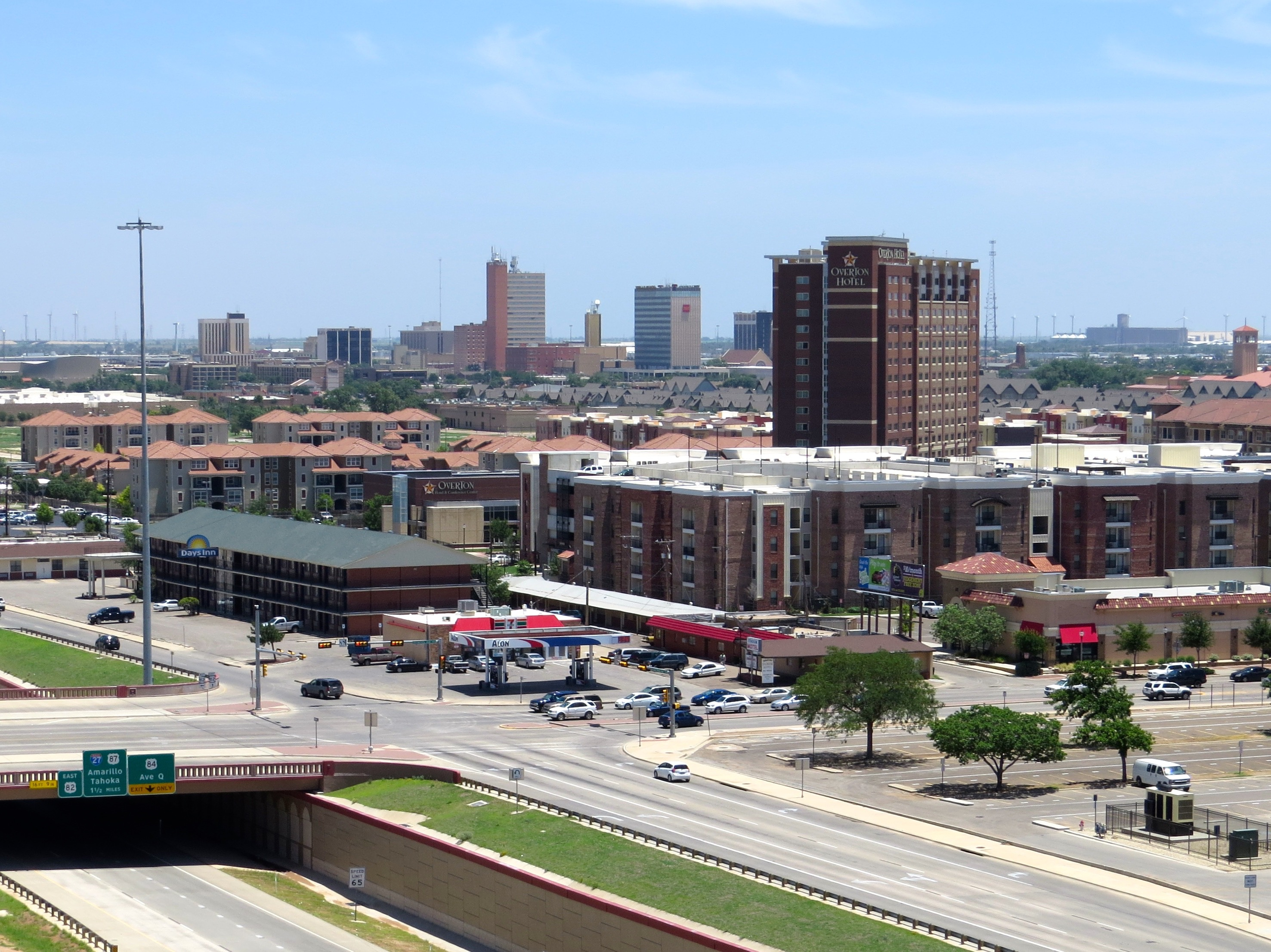
- Downtown Lubbock in 2013
Interactive Map of Lubbock–Plainview, TX CSA
City of Lubbock
Lubbock, TX MSA
Plainview, TX µSA
- Country: United States
- State: Texas
- Largest city: Lubbock
- Other cities: Levelland; Slaton; Tahoka; Crosbyton; Plainview

Area
  - Total: 2,560 sq mi (6,630 km^{2})

Population
  - Total: 322,257
  - Rank: 157 in the U.S.

GDP
  - Total: $18.116 billion (2022)
- Time zone: UTC-6 (CST)
  - Summer (DST): UTC-5 (CDT)

The Lubbock metropolitan area is a metropolitan statistical area (MSA) in the South Plains region of West Texas, United States, that covers six counties – Cochran, Crosby, Garza, Hockley, Lubbock, and Lynn. As of the 2020 census, the Lubbock MSA had a population of 351,268, though a 2025 estimate placed the population at 368,431, which ranks it the 154th-most populated MSA in the United States. The Lubbock MSA is a component of the larger Lubbock–Plainview combined statistical area.

== Communities ==
=== Places with more than 150,000 people ===
- Lubbock (Principal city)

=== Places with 15,000 to 25,000 people ===
- Plainview

=== Places with 5,000 to 15,000 people ===
- Levelland
- Slaton
- Wolfforth

=== Places with 1,000 to 5,000 people ===
- Abernathy
- Anton
- Crosbyton
- Hale Center
- Idalou
- Lorenzo
- Petersburg
- Ralls
- Ransom Canyon
- Shallowater
- Sundown
- Tahoka

=== Places with less than 1,000 people ===
- Buffalo Springs
- New Deal
- New Home
- O'Donnell
- Opdyke West
- Reese Center
- Ropesville
- Smyer
- Wilson

=== Unincorporated places ===
- Acuff
- Cone
- Cotton Center
- Grassland
- Roosevelt
- Slide
- Wayside
- Whitharral
- Woodrow

=== Ghost town ===
- Hale City

== Demographics ==
Historical populations
Census	Pop.	Note	%±
1900	1,098		—
1910	7,102		546.8%
1920	21,931		208.8%
1930	62,499		185.0%
1940	73,759		18.0%
1950	121,660		64.9%
1960	177,532		45.9%
1970	197,487		11.2%
1980	229,115		16.0%
1990	236,698		3.3%
2000	249,700		5.5%
2010	284,890		14.1%
2020	321,368		12.8%
U.S. Decennial Census 1900–1990

As of the census of 2020, 321,368 people, 120,841 households, and 73,302 families lived in the MSA. The racial makeup of the MSA was 61.8% White (49.8% non-Hispanic Whites), 8.1% African American, 1.0% Native American, 3.0% Asian, 11.68% from other races, and 13.9% from two or more races. Hispanics or Latinos of any race were 35.6% of the population.

In 2000, the median income for a household in the MSA was $28,984 and for a family was $35,479. Males had a median income of $26,868 versus $19,410 for females. The per capita income for the MSA was $15,884.

County	Seat	2025 estimate	2020 Census	Change	Area	Density
Lubbock	Lubbock	328,906	310,639	+5.88%	901 sq mi (2,330 km^{2})	365/sq mi (141/km^{2})
Hockley	Levelland	21,600	21,537	+0.29%	909 sq mi (2,350 km^{2})	24/sq mi (9/km^{2})
Lynn	Tahoka	6,017	5,596	+7.52%	893 sq mi (2,310 km^{2})	7/sq mi (3/km^{2})
Crosby	Crosbyton	4,852	5,133	−5.47%	902 sq mi (2,340 km^{2})	5/sq mi (2/km^{2})
Garza	Post	4,510	5,816	−22.46%	896 sq mi (2,320 km^{2})	5/sq mi (2/km^{2})
Cochran	Morton	2,546	2,547	−0.04%	775 sq mi (2,010 km^{2})	3/sq mi (1/km^{2})
Total		368,431	351,268	+4.89%	5,276 sq mi (13,660 km^{2})	70/sq mi (27/km^{2})

== See also ==
- List of cities in Texas
- List of museums in West Texas
- Texas census statistical areas
- List of Texas metropolitan areas
