= Roberts County Courthouse (Texas) =

- U.S. National Register of Historic Places
- Texas State Antiquities Landmark
- Recorded Texas Historic Landmark
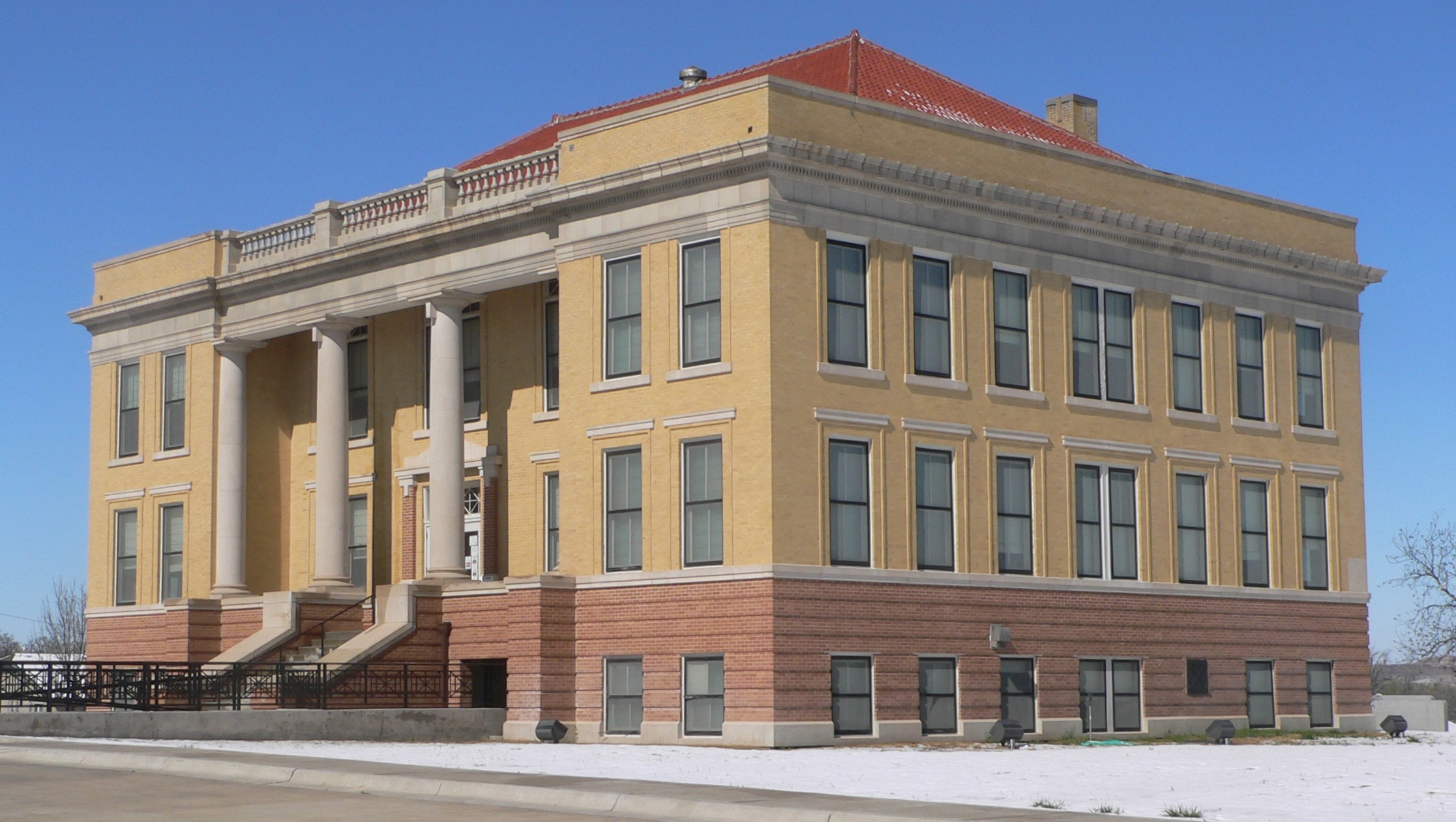
- Roberts County Courthouse in 2016

- Location within Texas Location within the United States
- Location: 301 E. Commercial St., Miami, Texas
- Coordinates: 35°41′34″N 100°38′7″W
- Area: less than one acre
- Built: 1913
- Built by: Bone and Parr Construction Co.
- Architect: Elmer George Withers
- Architectural style: Classical Revival
- NRHP reference No.: 04000228
- TSAL No.: 8200002429
- RTHL No.: 12593

Significant dates
- Added to NRHP: March 22, 2004
- Designated TSAL: January 1, 2004
- Designated RTHL: 2000

The Roberts County Courthouse in Miami, Texas, United States, at 301 E. Commercial St., was built in 1913. It was listed on the National Register of Historic Places in 2004.

It was designed by architect Elmer George Withers, who designed at least 11 Texas courthouses, and was built by Bone and Parr Construction Co. It is Classical Revival in style.

It is a Texas State Antiquities Landmark and a Recorded Texas Historic Landmark.

The building is the second courthouse which served Roberts County, as it replaced a frame building used as courthouse in Parnell from 1889 to 1898 before it was moved to Miami.

It was deemed significant "for its role as the center of government for Roberts County" and "as an intact example of a Classical Revival style public building. The courthouse retains integrity of design, materials, workmanship, location, setting, association and feeling to a high degree."

== See also ==
- National Register of Historic Places listings in Roberts County, Texas
- Recorded Texas Historic Landmarks in Roberts County
- List of county courthouses in Texas
