= Sidaway =

Sidaway is a surname. Notable people with the name include:

- Ashley Sidaway (birth year unknown), British screenwriter, producer, and editor
- Geoffrey Sidaway (1942–2014), British clergyman and Archdeacon of Gloucester
- Marlene Sidaway (born 1937), British television, theatre, and film actress
- Robert Sidaway (1758–1809), Australian convict of the First Fleet
- Robert Sidaway (actor) (1942–2024), British actor, writer, producer, and director, and father of Ashley

== See also ==
- Sidaway v Board of Governors of the Bethlem Royal Hospital, a 1985 English court case
- Sideways (disambiguation)
