= Reese National Security Complex =

Texas Tech University Reese National Security Complex
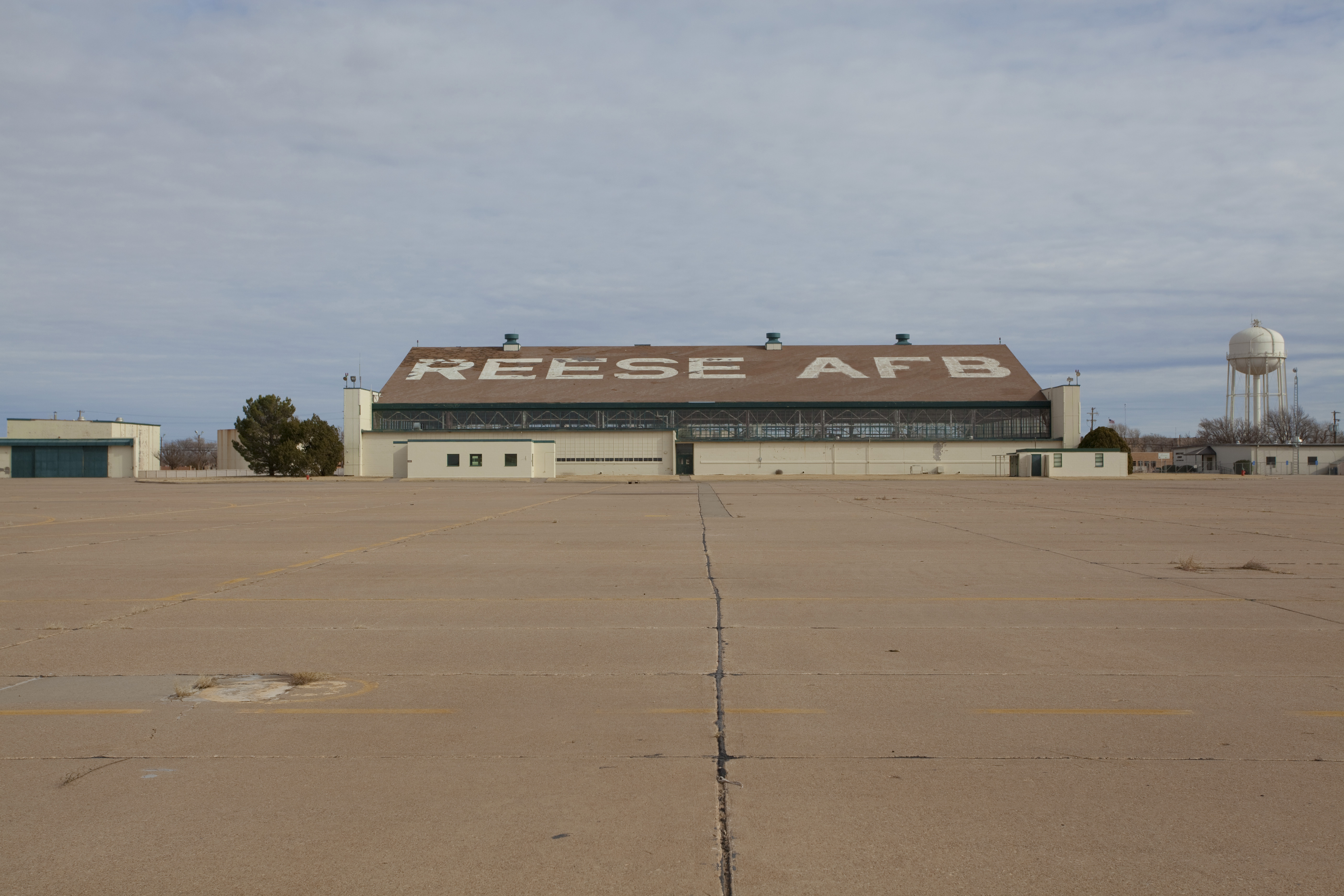
- Aircraft hangar at the former Reese Air Force Base, now Reese Technology Center

- Location within Texas

General information
- Type: Research Center
- Location: Lubbock, Texas, 9801 N. Reese Blvd, Suite 200, United States
- Coordinates: 33°35′47″N 102°02′34″W
- Opened: 1997

Technical details
- Size: 3,000 sq. ft.

Website
- http://www.reesetechnologycenter.com/

The Reese National Security Complex (formerly the Reese Technology Center) is a research and business park located on the grounds of former Reese Air Force Base in western Lubbock at the unincorporated community of Reese Center.

== History ==
After the Cold War ended, the Department of Defense made large-scale reductions in equipment, personnel, and bases, freeing U.S. taxpayer money for other uses. In 1995, Reese Air Force Base was placed on the Base Realignment and Closure Commission list, though community members and leaders did object. The Lubbock Reese Redevelopment Committee (LRRC) was created in 1995, just two weeks after the base was recommended to be closed.

The base was formally closed on September 30, 1997. The Lubbock Reese Redevelopment Committee was renamed the Redevelopment Authority (LRRA) and could now execute contracts for base property. This committee was composed of local government officials and area businesspeople.

In the years since the base closed, the use of per-and poly-fluoroalkyl substances (PFAS) by the USAF there has been investigated. Before the base closed, Air Force Firefighters were trained there to extinguish fires using foam containing PFAS. After using this substance for many years at the base, it began seeping into the groundwater. The Air Force is continually checking bases for PFAS to this day. Past Reese AFB residents are entitled to compensation if found to the following toxins: Testicular cancer, Renal (kidney) cancer, and Prostate cancer.

== Texas Tech University Oversight ==
Texas Tech University, in collaboration with the Lubbock Reese Redevelopment Authority, renamed the Reese Technology Center to the Texas Tech University Reese National Security Complex (RNSC) in 2025. The renaming reflects an expanded research mission authorized by House Bill 5092, passed in the 2025 legislative session.

== Wind technology research facility ==
The RNSC is presently home to the Scaled Wind Farm Technology (SWiFT) Facility, a collaborative research facility with the following research partners:

- Texas Tech University
- The National Wind Institute
- Sandia National Laboratories (SNL) for the Wind Energy Technologies Office (WETO) of the U.S. Department of Energy
- Vestas, a Danish wind turbine company
- Group NIRE, which is a renewable energy corporation created in 2010 by Texas Tech.

=== Related facilities ===
Along with the SWiFT Facility, the center also houses the following for the National Wind Institute's research:

- The Wind Engineering Research Field Laboratory (WERFL)
- VorTECH, which is designed to simulate tornadic winds of about 150 miles per hour or less.

== See also ==
- Llano Estacado
- West Texas
