= Sideways (disambiguation) =

Sideways is a 2004 comedy drama film.

Sideways may also refer to:

== Fiction ==
- Sideways (2009 film), a Japanese remake of the 2004 film
- Sideways Series, four wine-related novels by Rex Pickett
  - Sideways (novel), the 2004 first novel in the trilogy; basis for the films
- Sideways (comics), a DC Comics character
- Sideways, a Transformers: Armada character

== Music ==
=== Albums ===
- Sideways (Jacob Young album), or the title song, 2008
- Sideways (Men Without Hats album), 1991
- Sideways (Wrabel EP), or the title song, 2014
- Sideways, a 2010 EP by Jessica Poland

=== Songs ===
- "Sideways" (Clarence Greenwood song), 2004, also recorded by Santana in 2002
- "Sideways" (Dierks Bentley song), 2009
- "Sideways" (Illenium song), with Nurko and Valerie Broussard, 2021
- "Sideways" (Men Without Hats song), 1991
- "Sideways" (Zayn song), 2026
- "Sideways", by Balu Brigada, 2025
- "Sideways", by Carly Rae Jepsen from The Loneliest Time, 2022
- "Sideways", by Charlie Puth from Whatever's Clever!, 2026
- "Sideways", by Frank Ocean from Endless, 2016
- "Sideways", by Oliver Tree from Love You Madly Hate You Badly, 2026
- "Sideways", by Theory of a Deadman from Dinosaur, 2023

== See also ==
- Sidaway, a surname
- Sideway, an area in Stoke-on-Trent, Staffordshire, England
- Sideway, Kentucky, US
- Sidewise Award for Alternate History, an annual fiction award
- Wayside (disambiguation)
