= Scaled Wind Farm Technology Facility =

Wind turbine research facility

The Scaled Wind Farm Technology (SWiFT) Facility is a collaborative research facility, located at the Reese Technology Center in Lubbock, Texas, in the United States. It is the first public facility to use multiple wind turbines to measure turbine performance in a wind farm environment as a user facility for the Wind Energy Technologies Office of the United States Department of Energy. The project was formally commissioned in the summer of 2013.

== Partners ==
Some of the present research collaboration involves the following research partners:

- Texas Tech University
- National Wind Institute
- Sandia National Laboratories (SNL) for the Wind Energy Technologies Office (WETO) of the U.S. Department of Energy
- Vestas, a Danish wind company
- Group NIRE, a renewable energy corporation created in 2010 by Texas Tech.

== Facilities ==
The SWiFT facilities consist of:

- SWiFT Wind Turbines: Three research-scale wind turbines (modified Vestas V27s), two deployed by Sandia and the third one by Vesta
- Meteorological (MET) Towers: Two 60-meter-tall anemometer towers for measuring wind speed
- Control Building: Housing 640 square feet of computing space for wind-turbine control
- Assembly Building: A 5,500 square foot, environmentally controlled high-bay assembly area with machining capabilities (lathe, multiple mills, drill press, welders, and related items)
