= National Wind Institute =

Research institute in the US

Coordinates: 33.586691°N 101.874055°W

- Established: 1970
- Faculty: 35
- Postgraduates: 40
- Location: Lubbock, Texas, U.S.
- Website: www.nwi.ttu.edu

The National Wind Institute (NWI) at Texas Tech University (TTU) was established in December 2012, and is intended to serve as Texas Tech University's intellectual hub for interdisciplinary and transdisciplinary research, commercialization and education related to wind science, wind energy, wind engineering and wind hazard mitigation and serves faculty affiliates, students, and external partners.

In 2003, with support from the National Science Foundation, the first interdisciplinary Ph.D. program dedicated to wind science and engineering was developed. Later, the Texas Wind Energy Institute (TWEI) was established and is a partnership between TTU and Texas State Technical College designed to develop education and career pathways to meet workforce and educational needs of the expanding wind energy industry. It is funded in part by the Texas Workforce Commission. In an effort to streamline and to promote synergy, both WiSE and TWEI have now integrated to form the National Wind Institute.

NWI organizes and administers large multi-dimensional TTU wind-related research projects and serves as the contact point for major project sponsors and other external partners.

== History ==
The Wind Science and Engineering (WiSE) Research Center was established in 1970 as the Institute for Disaster Research, following the F5 Lubbock tornado that caused 26 fatalities and over $100 million in damage. Following the aftermath of the tornado, the WISE center developed the first comprehensive wind engineering report of its kind. In 2006, the Enhanced Fujita scale was developed at TTU to update the original Fujita scale that was first introduced in 1971. In 2003, with support from the National Science Foundation, the first interdisciplinary Ph.D. program dedicated to wind science and engineering was developed. Later, the Texas Wind Energy Institute (TWEI) was established as a partnership between TTU and Texas State Technical College designed to develop education and career pathways to meet workforce and educational needs of the expanding wind energy industry. A bachelor's degree program in Wind Energy was opened in Spring 2012 and now has more than 100 students in the process of completing the degree requirements.

Both WiSE and TWEI have now integrated to form the National Wind Institute (NWI).

== Research Facilities ==
The Texas Tech campus hosts the NWI's administrative offices and the Boundary Layer Wind Tunnel and Wind Library.

Facilities at the campus consist of:

- The Boundary Layer Wind Tunnel is a closed wind tunnel offering a 1.8 m (5.9 ft) by 1.2 m (3.9 ft) test section that is capable of producing up winds speeds of up to 45 m/s (100 mph).
- The Debris Impact Facility
- The Pulsed Jet Wind Tunnel, which is used to simulate thunderstorm downbursts.
- The NWI's Wind Library, which hosts one of the largest collections of wind related material in the world. The collection includes Ted Fujita's papers, reports and photographs, which were donated by the Fujita family and the University of Chicago. The library also includes documentation of more than 100 windstorms.

=== NWI research at the Reese Technology Center ===
The National Wind Institute occupies 56,000 square feet (5,200 m^{2}) of indoor laboratory space and has a large 67-acre field test site at the Reese Technology Center. Some of the facilities housed at the Reese Center include:

- A 200-meter data acquisition tower, used to measure and record atmospheric conditions at ten levels,
- The Scaled Wind Farm Technology (SWiFT) Facility
- A weather balloon facility.
- VorTECH, a tornado vortex simulator.
- The Wind Engineering Research Field Laboratory (WERFL)

The Reese Center is also home to several radar systems including a SODAR, Low Level Profiler, and the SMART-R Mobile Radar.

== Research ==
=== Wind energy ===
Some of the National Wind Institute's wind energy research goals are the assessment of the risk and effects on wind turbine exposure to extreme wind events, the improvement of wind turbine design codes with emphasis on extreme wind events, and the analysis and testing of utility-scale wind turbines for use in less-energetic wind conditions. The NWI is also focused on the identification of advanced wind-driven water treatment and desalination systems for municipal and other applications, as well as the full-scale testing of wind-driven water desalination systems and the development of modeling codes for integrated wind-water desalination systems.

=== Debris impact ===
The NWI Debris Impact Facility performs tests on storm shelters and their various components to see if they meet established Federal Emergency Management Agency (FEMA)l and International Code Council guidelines. The Debris Impact Facility houses a high-powered air cannon that shoots wooden two-by-fours at shelter walls and doors to simulate flying debris. The cannon is capable of producing simulated wind speeds of more than 250 mph and provides valuable impact resistance data. Such data is used to develop standards for safe above-ground and below-ground shelters and continues to be in demand for testing new shelter materials and constructions.

== See also ==
- Tornado intensity and damage
