= Texas statistical areas =

Coordinates: 31.4757°N 99.3312°W

The U.S. State of Texas currently has 80 statistical areas that have been delineated by the Office of Management and Budget (OMB). On July 21, 2023, the OMB delineated 13 combined statistical areas, 26 metropolitan statistical areas, and 41 micropolitan statistical areas in Texas. As of 2023, the largest of these is the Dallas–Fort Worth, TX-OK CSA, encompassing the area around the twin cities of Dallas and Fort Worth in the northern part of the state.

Owing to its large area and population - the second-highest amongst the 50 states in both respects - Texas contains the most statistical areas of any state.

== Statistical areas ==
The Office of Management and Budget (OMB) has designated more than 1,000 statistical areas for the United States and Puerto Rico. These statistical areas are important geographic delineations of population clusters used by the OMB, the United States Census Bureau, planning organizations, and federal, state, and local government entities.

The OMB defines a core-based statistical area (CBSA) as the county or counties (or county-equivalents) surrounding at least one densely-settled core of at least 10,000 population, "plus adjacent counties having a high degree of social and economic integration with the core as measured through commuting ties with the counties containing the core". The OMB further divides a CBSA based on population into a metropolitan statistical area (MSA) for those with at least 50,000 people or a micropolitan statistical area (μSA) for those with 10,000 to 49,999 people.

The OMB defines a combined statistical area (CSA) as two or more adjacent CBSAs where the employment interchange rate (percent commuting from A to B plus percent commuting from B to A) is at least 15%. A primary statistical area (PSA) includes all CSAs and any CBSA that is not a constituent of a combined statistical area.

The 80 United States statistical areas and 254 counties of the State of Texas (Note: An out-of-state area and its population are displayed in green. An area that extends into more than one state is displayed in purple. A purple population number over a black population number show the total population versus the in-state population. The state's abbreviation is also shown next to the in-state total.)
Combined statistical area	2025 population (est.)	Core-based statistical area	2025 population (est.)	County	2025 population (est.)	Metropolitan division	2025 population (est.)
Dallas–Fort Worth, TX-OK CSA	9,051,994; 9,000,627(TX)	Dallas–Fort Worth–Arlington, TX MSA	8,477,157	Dallas County, Texas	2,661,397	Dallas–Plano–Irving, TX MD	5,742,098
Dallas–Fort Worth, TX-OK CSA	9,051,994; 9,000,627(TX)	Dallas–Fort Worth–Arlington, TX MSA	8,477,157	Collin County, Texas	1,297,179	Dallas–Plano–Irving, TX MD	5,742,098
Dallas–Fort Worth, TX-OK CSA	9,051,994; 9,000,627(TX)	Dallas–Fort Worth–Arlington, TX MSA	8,477,157	Denton County, Texas	1,069,346	Dallas–Plano–Irving, TX MD	5,742,098
Dallas–Fort Worth, TX-OK CSA	9,051,994; 9,000,627(TX)	Dallas–Fort Worth–Arlington, TX MSA	8,477,157	Ellis County, Texas	240,867	Dallas–Plano–Irving, TX MD	5,742,098
Dallas–Fort Worth, TX-OK CSA	9,051,994; 9,000,627(TX)	Dallas–Fort Worth–Arlington, TX MSA	8,477,157	Kaufman County, Texas	209,235	Dallas–Plano–Irving, TX MD	5,742,098
Dallas–Fort Worth, TX-OK CSA	9,051,994; 9,000,627(TX)	Dallas–Fort Worth–Arlington, TX MSA	8,477,157	Rockwall County, Texas	140,738	Dallas–Plano–Irving, TX MD	5,742,098
Dallas–Fort Worth, TX-OK CSA	9,051,994; 9,000,627(TX)	Dallas–Fort Worth–Arlington, TX MSA	8,477,157	Hunt County, Texas	123,336	Dallas–Plano–Irving, TX MD	5,742,098
Dallas–Fort Worth, TX-OK CSA	9,051,994; 9,000,627(TX)	Dallas–Fort Worth–Arlington, TX MSA	8,477,157	Tarrant County, Texas	2,248,466	Fort Worth–Arlington–Grapevine, TX MD	2,735,059
Dallas–Fort Worth, TX-OK CSA	9,051,994; 9,000,627(TX)	Dallas–Fort Worth–Arlington, TX MSA	8,477,157	Johnson County, Texas	218,048	Fort Worth–Arlington–Grapevine, TX MD	2,735,059
Dallas–Fort Worth, TX-OK CSA	9,051,994; 9,000,627(TX)	Dallas–Fort Worth–Arlington, TX MSA	8,477,157	Parker County, Texas	184,767	Fort Worth–Arlington–Grapevine, TX MD	2,735,059
Dallas–Fort Worth, TX-OK CSA	9,051,994; 9,000,627(TX)	Dallas–Fort Worth–Arlington, TX MSA	8,477,157	Wise County, Texas	78,097	Fort Worth–Arlington–Grapevine, TX MD	2,735,059
Dallas–Fort Worth, TX-OK CSA	9,051,994; 9,000,627(TX)	Sherman–Denison, TX MSA	153,613	Grayson County, Texas	153,613	none	
Dallas–Fort Worth, TX-OK CSA	9,051,994; 9,000,627(TX)	Athens, TX μSA	88,595	Henderson County, Texas	88,595	none	
Dallas–Fort Worth, TX-OK CSA	9,051,994; 9,000,627(TX)	Granbury, TX μSA	70,501	Hood County, Texas	70,501	none	
Dallas–Fort Worth, TX-OK CSA	9,051,994; 9,000,627(TX)	Corsicana, TX μSA	57,181	Navarro County, Texas	57,181	none	
Dallas–Fort Worth, TX-OK CSA	9,051,994; 9,000,627(TX)	Durant, OK μSA	51,367	Bryan County, Oklahoma	51,367	none	
Dallas–Fort Worth, TX-OK CSA	9,051,994; 9,000,627(TX)	Gainesville, TX μSA	44,461	Cooke County, Texas	44,461	none	
Dallas–Fort Worth, TX-OK CSA	9,051,994; 9,000,627(TX)	Sulphur Springs, TX μSA	39,063	Hopkins County, Texas	39,063	none	
Dallas–Fort Worth, TX-OK CSA	9,051,994; 9,000,627(TX)	Bonham, TX μSA	39,265	Fannin County, Texas	39,265	none	
Dallas–Fort Worth, TX-OK CSA	9,051,994; 9,000,627(TX)	Mineral Wells, TX μSA	30,791	Palo Pinto County, Texas	30,791	none	
Houston–Pasadena, TX CSA	8,105,280	Houston–Pasadena–The Woodlands, TX MSA	7,904,627	Harris County, Texas	5,045,026	none	
Houston–Pasadena, TX CSA	8,105,280	Houston–Pasadena–The Woodlands, TX MSA	7,904,627	Fort Bend County, Texas	975,191	none	
Houston–Pasadena, TX CSA	8,105,280	Houston–Pasadena–The Woodlands, TX MSA	7,904,627	Montgomery County, Texas	781,194	none	
Houston–Pasadena, TX CSA	8,105,280	Houston–Pasadena–The Woodlands, TX MSA	7,904,627	Brazoria County, Texas	419,080	none	
Houston–Pasadena, TX CSA	8,105,280	Houston–Pasadena–The Woodlands, TX MSA	7,904,627	Galveston County, Texas	372,207	none	
Houston–Pasadena, TX CSA	8,105,280	Houston–Pasadena–The Woodlands, TX MSA	7,904,627	Liberty County, Texas	121,364	none	
Houston–Pasadena, TX CSA	8,105,280	Houston–Pasadena–The Woodlands, TX MSA	7,904,627	Waller County, Texas	69,858	none	
Houston–Pasadena, TX CSA	8,105,280	Houston–Pasadena–The Woodlands, TX MSA	7,904,627	Chambers County, Texas	57,594	none	
Houston–Pasadena, TX CSA	8,105,280	Houston–Pasadena–The Woodlands, TX MSA	7,904,627	Austin County, Texas	33,625	none	
Houston–Pasadena, TX CSA	8,105,280	Houston–Pasadena–The Woodlands, TX MSA	7,904,627	San Jacinto County, Texas	29,488	none	
Houston–Pasadena, TX CSA	8,105,280	Huntsville, TX μSA	83,842	Walker County, Texas	83,842	none	
Houston–Pasadena, TX CSA	8,105,280	El Campo, TX μSA	42,060	Wharton County, Texas	42,060	none	
Houston–Pasadena, TX CSA	8,105,280	Brenham, TX μSA	38,288	Washington County, Texas	38,288	none	
Houston–Pasadena, TX CSA	8,105,280	Bay City, TX μSA	36,463	Matagorda County, Texas	36,463	none	
San Antonio–New Braunfels–Kerrville, TX CSA	2,895,704	San Antonio–New Braunfels, TX MSA	2,813,140	Bexar County, Texas	2,160,088	none	
San Antonio–New Braunfels–Kerrville, TX CSA	2,895,704	San Antonio–New Braunfels, TX MSA	2,813,140	Comal County, Texas	209,166	none	
San Antonio–New Braunfels–Kerrville, TX CSA	2,895,704	San Antonio–New Braunfels, TX MSA	2,813,140	Guadalupe County, Texas	201,111	none	
San Antonio–New Braunfels–Kerrville, TX CSA	2,895,704	San Antonio–New Braunfels, TX MSA	2,813,140	Medina County, Texas	56,881	none	
San Antonio–New Braunfels–Kerrville, TX CSA	2,895,704	San Antonio–New Braunfels, TX MSA	2,813,140	Wilson County, Texas	56,139	none	
San Antonio–New Braunfels–Kerrville, TX CSA	2,895,704	San Antonio–New Braunfels, TX MSA	2,813,140	Atascosa County, Texas	53,590	none	
San Antonio–New Braunfels–Kerrville, TX CSA	2,895,704	San Antonio–New Braunfels, TX MSA	2,813,140	Kendall County, Texas	53,289	none	
San Antonio–New Braunfels–Kerrville, TX CSA	2,895,704	San Antonio–New Braunfels, TX MSA	2,813,140	Bandera County, Texas	22,876	none	
San Antonio–New Braunfels–Kerrville, TX CSA	2,895,704	Kerrville, TX μSA	54,037	Kerr County, Texas	54,037	none	
San Antonio–New Braunfels–Kerrville, TX CSA	2,895,704	Fredericksburg, TX μSA	28,527	Gillespie County, Texas	28,527	none	
none		Austin–Round Rock–San Marcos, TX MSA	2,620,945	Travis County, Texas	1,389,670	none	
none		Austin–Round Rock–San Marcos, TX MSA	2,620,945	Williamson County, Texas	752,827	none	
none		Austin–Round Rock–San Marcos, TX MSA	2,620,945	Hays County, Texas	304,390	none	
none		Austin–Round Rock–San Marcos, TX MSA	2,620,945	Bastrop County, Texas	118,908	none	
none		Austin–Round Rock–San Marcos, TX MSA	2,620,945	Caldwell County, Texas	55,150	none	
McAllen–Edinburg, TX CSA	987,868	McAllen–Edinburg–Mission, TX MSA	921,549	Hidalgo County, Texas	921,549	none	
McAllen–Edinburg, TX CSA	987,868	Rio Grande City–Roma, TX μSA	66,319	Starr County, Texas	66,319	none	
El Paso–Las Cruces, TX-NM CSA	1,110,382; 881,291(TX)	El Paso, TX MSA	881,291	El Paso County, Texas	877,858	none	
El Paso–Las Cruces, TX-NM CSA	1,110,382; 881,291(TX)	El Paso, TX MSA	881,291	Hudspeth County, Texas	3,433	none	
El Paso–Las Cruces, TX-NM CSA	1,110,382; 881,291(TX)	Las Cruces, NM MSA	229,091	Doña Ana County, New Mexico	229,091	none	
Corpus Christi–Kingsville–Alice, TX CSA	526,889	Corpus Christi, TX MSA	451,191	Nueces County, Texas	352,992	none	
Corpus Christi–Kingsville–Alice, TX CSA	526,889	Corpus Christi, TX MSA	451,191	San Patricio County, Texas	72,053	none	
Corpus Christi–Kingsville–Alice, TX CSA	526,889	Corpus Christi, TX MSA	451,191	Aransas County, Texas	26,146	none	
Corpus Christi–Kingsville–Alice, TX CSA	526,889	Alice, TX μSA	45,383	Jim Wells County, Texas	45,383	none	
Corpus Christi–Kingsville–Alice, TX CSA	526,889	Alice, TX μSA	45,383	Brooks County, Texas	6,579	none	
Corpus Christi–Kingsville–Alice, TX CSA	526,889	Kingsville, TX μSA	30,315	Kleberg County, Texas	30,315	none	
none		Killeen–Temple, TX MSA	511,497	Bell County, Texas	402,248	none	
none		Killeen–Temple, TX MSA	511,497	Coryell County, Texas	85,592	none	
none		Killeen–Temple, TX MSA	511,497	Lampasas County, Texas	23,657	none	
Brownsville–Harlingen–Raymondville, TX CSA	453,917	Brownsville–Harlingen, TX MSA	433,946	Cameron County, Texas	433,946	none	
Brownsville–Harlingen–Raymondville, TX CSA	453,917	Raymondville, TX μSA	19,971	Willacy County, Texas	19,971	none	
Lubbock–Plainview, TX CSA	405,131	Lubbock, TX MSA	368,431	Lubbock County, Texas	328,906	none	
Lubbock–Plainview, TX CSA	405,131	Lubbock, TX MSA	368,431	Hockley County, Texas	21,600	none	
Lubbock–Plainview, TX CSA	405,131	Lubbock, TX MSA	368,431	Lynn County, Texas	6,017	none	
Lubbock–Plainview, TX CSA	405,131	Lubbock, TX MSA	368,431	Crosby County, Texas	4,852	none	
Lubbock–Plainview, TX CSA	405,131	Lubbock, TX MSA	368,431	Garza County, Texas	4,510	none	
Lubbock–Plainview, TX CSA	405,131	Lubbock, TX MSA	368,431	Cochran County, Texas	2,546	none	
Lubbock–Plainview, TX CSA	405,131	Plainview, TX μSA	36,700	Hale County, Texas	31,819	none	
Lubbock–Plainview, TX CSA	405,131	Plainview, TX μSA	36,700	Floyd County, Texas	4,881	none	
none		Beaumont–Port Arthur, TX MSA	399,310	Jefferson County, Texas	254,321	none	
none		Beaumont–Port Arthur, TX MSA	399,310	Orange County, Texas	86,266	none	
none		Beaumont–Port Arthur, TX MSA	399,310	Hardin County, Texas	58,723	none	
Midland–Odessa–Andrews, TX CSA	385,854	Midland, TX MSA	193,139	Midland County, Texas	187,855	none	
Midland–Odessa–Andrews, TX CSA	385,854	Midland, TX MSA	193,139	Martin County, Texas	5,284	none	
Midland–Odessa–Andrews, TX CSA	385,854	Odessa, TX MSA	164,494	Ector County, Texas	164,494	none	
Midland–Odessa–Andrews, TX CSA	385,854	Andrews, TX μSA	18,914	Andrews County, Texas	18,914	none	
none		Waco, TX MSA	308,807	McLennan County, Texas	272,020	none	
none		Waco, TX MSA	308,807	Bosque County, Texas	18,918	none	
none		Waco, TX MSA	308,807	Falls County, Texas	17,869	none	
Tyler–Jacksonville, TX CSA	305,886	Tyler, TX MSA	252,549	Smith County, Texas	252,549	none	
Tyler–Jacksonville, TX CSA	305,886	Jacksonville, TX μSA	53,337	Cherokee County, Texas	53,337	none	
none		Longview, TX MSA	297,315	Gregg County, Texas	126,095	none	
none		Longview, TX MSA	297,315	Harrison County, Texas	71,956	none	
none		Longview, TX MSA	297,315	Rusk County, Texas	54,854	none	
none		Longview, TX MSA	297,315	Upshur County, Texas	44,410	none	
Amarillo–Borger, TX CSA	295,868	Amarillo, TX MSA	276,235	Randall County, Texas	152,351	none	
Amarillo–Borger, TX CSA	295,868	Amarillo, TX MSA	276,235	Potter County, Texas	114,453	none	
Amarillo–Borger, TX CSA	295,868	Amarillo, TX MSA	276,235	Carson County, Texas	5,805	none	
Amarillo–Borger, TX CSA	295,868	Amarillo, TX MSA	276,235	Armstrong County, Texas	1,843	none	
Amarillo–Borger, TX CSA	295,868	Amarillo, TX MSA	276,235	Oldham County, Texas	1,783	none	
Amarillo–Borger, TX CSA	295,868	Borger, TX μSA	19,633	Hutchinson County, Texas	19,633	none	
none		College Station–Bryan, TX MSA	287,476	Brazos County, Texas	249,088	none	
none		College Station–Bryan, TX MSA	287,476	Burleson County, Texas	20,549	none	
none		College Station–Bryan, TX MSA	287,476	Robertson County, Texas	17,839	none	
none		Laredo, TX MSA	281,224	Webb County, Texas	281,224	none	
Abilene–Sweetwater, TX CSA	199,546	Abilene, TX MSA	185,429	Taylor County, Texas	150,077	none	
Abilene–Sweetwater, TX CSA	199,546	Abilene, TX MSA	185,429	Jones County, Texas	20,861	none	
Abilene–Sweetwater, TX CSA	199,546	Abilene, TX MSA	185,429	Callahan County, Texas	14,491	none	
Abilene–Sweetwater, TX CSA	199,546	Sweetwater, TX μSA	14,117	Nolan County, Texas	14,117	none	
none		Wichita Falls, TX MSA	149,448	Wichita County, Texas	129,555	none	
none		Wichita Falls, TX MSA	149,448	Clay County, Texas	10,764	none	
none		Wichita Falls, TX MSA	149,448	Archer County, Texas	9,129	none	
none		San Angelo, TX MSA	122,065	Tom Green County, Texas	120,602	none	
none		San Angelo, TX MSA	122,065	Irion County, Texas	1,463	none	
Victoria–Port Lavaca, TX CSA	119,463	Victoria, TX MSA	99,864	Victoria County, Texas	92,656	none	
Victoria–Port Lavaca, TX CSA	119,463	Victoria, TX MSA	99,864	Goliad County, Texas	7,208	none	
Victoria–Port Lavaca, TX CSA	119,463	Port Lavaca, TX μSA	19,599	Calhoun County, Texas	19,599	none	
none		Texarkana, TX-AR MSA	146,816; 92,696(TX)	Bowie County, Texas	92,696	none	
none		Texarkana, TX-AR MSA	146,816; 92,696(TX)	Miller County, Arkansas	42,357	none	
none		Texarkana, TX-AR MSA	146,816; 92,696(TX)	Little River County, Arkansas	11,763	none	
none		Lufkin, TX μSA	88,154	Angelina County, Texas	88,154	none	
none		Nacogdoches, TX μSA	66,035	Nacogdoches County, Texas	66,035	none	
none		Paris, TX μSA	63,319	Lamar County, Texas	51,503	none	
none		Paris, TX μSA	63,319	Red River County, Texas	11,816	none	
none		Eagle Pass, TX MSA	58,823	Maverick County, Texas	58,823	none	
none		Palestine, TX μSA	59,805	Anderson County, Texas	59,805	none	
none		Mount Pleasant, TX μSA	57,076	Titus County, Texas	31,563	none	
none		Mount Pleasant, TX μSA	57,076	Camp County, Texas	13,380	none	
none		Mount Pleasant, TX μSA	57,076	Morris County, Texas	12,133	none	
none		Del Rio, TX μSA	47,835	Val Verde County, Texas	47,835	none	
none		Stephenville, TX μSA	43,911	Erath County, Texas	43,911	none	
none		Brownwood, TX μSA	38,711	Brown County, Texas	38,711	none	
none		Beeville, TX μSA	32,515	Bee County, Texas	32,515	none	
none		Big Spring, TX μSA	30,504	Howard County, Texas	30,504	none	
none		Uvalde, TX μSA	24,963	Uvalde County, Texas	24,963	none	
none		Pampa, TX μSA	21,786	Gray County, Texas	20,919	none	
none		Pampa, TX μSA	21,786	Roberts County, Texas	867	none	
none		Dumas, TX μSA	21,891	Moore County, Texas	21,891	none	
none		Hereford, TX μSA	18,626	Deaf Smith County, Texas	18,626	none	
none		Snyder, TX μSA	16,162	Scurry County, Texas	16,162	none	
none		Zapata, TX μSA	13,753	Zapata County, Texas	13,753	none	
none		Vernon, TX μSA	12,481	Wilbarger County, Texas	12,481	none	
none		Town of Pecos, TX μSA	12,138	Reeves County, Texas	12,138	none	
none		none		Van Zandt County, Texas	66,130	none	
none		none		Polk County, Texas	53,434	none	
none		none		Burnet County, Texas	57,015	none	
none		none		Wood County, Texas	49,688	none	
none		none		Hill County, Texas	39,503	none	
none		none		Jasper County, Texas	33,075	none	
none		none		Grimes County, Texas	34,252	none	
none		none		Cass County, Texas	28,651	none	
none		none		Milam County, Texas	26,258	none	
none		none		Fayette County, Texas	25,459	none	
none		none		Shelby County, Texas	24,286	none	
none		none		Llano County, Texas	23,353	none	
none		none		Panola County, Texas	23,018	none	
none		none		Gaines County, Texas	23,956	none	
none		none		Limestone County, Texas	22,849	none	
none		none		Houston County, Texas	22,316	none	
none		none		Montague County, Texas	21,966	none	
none		none		Colorado County, Texas	21,439	none	
none		none		Lavaca County, Texas	20,651	none	
none		none		Freestone County, Texas	20,811	none	
none		none		Tyler County, Texas	20,443	none	
none		none		Gonzales County, Texas	20,159	none	
none		none		DeWitt County, Texas	20,309	none	
none		none		Lee County, Texas	18,729	none	
none		none		Young County, Texas	18,154	none	
none		none		Eastland County, Texas	18,143	none	
none		none		Frio County, Texas	18,823	none	
none		none		Leon County, Texas	16,894	none	
none		none		Jackson County, Texas	15,393	none	
none		none		Karnes County, Texas	15,018	none	
none		none		Pecos County, Texas	14,560	none	
none		none		Trinity County, Texas	14,384	none	
none		none		Comanche County, Texas	14,432	none	
none		none		Madison County, Texas	14,226	none	
none		none		Blanco County, Texas	13,581	none	
none		none		Rains County, Texas	13,542	none	
none		none		Lamb County, Texas	12,579	none	
none		none		Newton County, Texas	11,954	none	
none		none		Dawson County, Texas	11,776	none	
none		none		Live Oak County, Texas	11,929	none	
none		none		Terry County, Texas	11,720	none	
none		none		Ward County, Texas	11,125	none	
none		none		Franklin County, Texas	10,994	none	
none		none		Sabine County, Texas	10,012	none	
none		none		Somervell County, Texas	10,261	none	
none		none		Runnels County, Texas	9,693	none	
none		none		Ochiltree County, Texas	9,284	none	
none		none		Parmer County, Texas	9,678	none	
none		none		Duval County, Texas	9,402	none	
none		none		Marion County, Texas	9,896	none	
none		none		Brewster County, Texas	9,458	none	
none		none		Stephens County, Texas	9,380	none	
none		none		Zavala County, Texas	9,037	none	
none		none		Mitchell County, Texas	8,947	none	
none		none		Jack County, Texas	9,563	none	
none		none		Hamilton County, Texas	8,680	none	
none		none		Dimmit County, Texas	8,024	none	
none		none		Coleman County, Texas	7,915	none	
none		none		San Augustine County, Texas	7,722	none	
none		none		Yoakum County, Texas	7,438	none	
none		none		McCulloch County, Texas	7,472	none	
none		none		Winkler County, Texas	7,540	none	
none		none		Dallam County, Texas	7,508	none	
none		none		Castro County, Texas	7,295	none	
none		none		Swisher County, Texas	6,703	none	
none		none		Childress County, Texas	6,643	none	
none		none		Bailey County, Texas	6,963	none	
none		none		Refugio County, Texas	6,657	none	
none		none		La Salle County, Texas	6,517	none	
none		none		San Saba County, Texas	5,787	none	
none		none		Presidio County, Texas	5,433	none	
none		none		Delta County, Texas	5,549	none	
none		none		Haskell County, Texas	5,499	none	
none		none		Hartley County, Texas	4,904	none	
none		none		Hansford County, Texas	4,944	none	
none		none		Wheeler County, Texas	4,773	none	
none		none		Jim Hogg County, Texas	4,555	none	
none		none		Crane County, Texas	4,554	none	
none		none		Mills County, Texas	4,580	none	
none		none		Kimble County, Texas	4,438	none	
none		none		Mason County, Texas	3,990	none	
none		none		Fisher County, Texas	3,692	none	
none		none		Hardeman County, Texas	3,292	none	
none		none		Baylor County, Texas	3,472	none	
none		none		Coke County, Texas	3,412	none	
none		none		Knox County, Texas	3,192	none	
none		none		Concho County, Texas	3,607	none	
none		none		Shackelford County, Texas	3,197	none	
none		none		Sutton County, Texas	3,203	none	
none		none		Donley County, Texas	3,213	none	
none		none		Hemphill County, Texas	3,083	none	
none		none		Kinney County, Texas	3,128	none	
none		none		Reagan County, Texas	3,166	none	
none		none		Upton County, Texas	3,131	none	
none		none		Lipscomb County, Texas	2,955	none	
none		none		Crockett County, Texas	2,769	none	
none		none		Real County, Texas	2,745	none	
none		none		Hall County, Texas	2,737	none	
none		none		Sherman County, Texas	2,781	none	
none		none		Collingsworth County, Texas	2,487	none	
none		none		Schleicher County, Texas	2,245	none	
none		none		Culberson County, Texas	2,267	none	
none		none		Menard County, Texas	1,956	none	
none		none		Jeff Davis County, Texas	1,711	none	
none		none		Dickens County, Texas	1,692	none	
none		none		Throckmorton County, Texas	1,554	none	
none		none		Briscoe County, Texas	1,474	none	
none		none		Sterling County, Texas	1,349	none	
none		none		Edwards County, Texas	1,370	none	
none		none		Cottle County, Texas	1,224	none	
none		none		Stonewall County, Texas	1,186	none	
none		none		Glasscock County, Texas	1,128	none	
none		none		Foard County, Texas	1,044	none	
none		none		Motley County, Texas	1,043	none	
none		none		Kent County, Texas	674	none	
none		none		Terrell County, Texas	702	none	
none		none		Borden County, Texas	567	none	
none		none		McMullen County, Texas	544	none	
none		none		Kenedy County, Texas	319	none	
none		none		King County, Texas	192	none	
none		none		Loving County, Texas	52	none	
State of Texas					31,701,412	none	

== Core-based statistical areas ==
The following table provides the in-state population ranking of each CBSA along with its rate of population change over time.

The 67 core-based statistical areas of the State of Texas (Note: For CBSAs comprising populations from multiple states, they are listed twice to show both their intrastate population within that CBSA as well as the CBSA's total population. Only the intrastate population is ranked.)
2025 rank	Core-based statistical area	Population				
2025 rank	Core-based statistical area	2025 estimate	Change	2020 Census	Change	2010 Census
1	Dallas–Fort Worth–Arlington, TX MSA	8,477,157	+11.00%	7,637,387	+19.96%	6,366,542
2	Houston–Pasadena–The Woodlands, TX MSA	7,904,627	+10.56%	7,149,642	+20.23%	5,946,800
3	San Antonio–New Braunfels, TX MSA	2,813,140	+9.97%	2,558,143	+19.40%	2,142,508
4	Austin–Round Rock–San Marcos, TX MSA	2,620,945	+14.78%	2,283,371	+33.04%	1,716,289
5	McAllen–Edinburg–Mission, TX MSA	921,549	+5.83%	870,781	+12.39%	774,769
6	El Paso, TX MSA	881,291	+1.43%	868,859	+8.05%	804,123
7	Killeen–Temple, TX MSA	511,497	+7.60%	475,367	+17.29%	405,300
8	Corpus Christi, TX MSA	451,191	+1.22%	445,763	+4.11%	428,185
9	Brownsville–Harlingen, TX MSA	433,946	+3.07%	421,017	+3.64%	406,220
10	Beaumont–Port Arthur, TX MSA	399,310	+0.44%	397,565	+2.27%	388,745
11	Lubbock, TX MSA	368,431	+4.89%	351,268	+8.64%	323,328
12	Waco, TX MSA	308,807	+4.40%	295,782	+9.15%	270,984
13	Longview, TX MSA	297,315	+3.89%	286,184	+2.21%	280,000
14	College Station–Bryan, TX MSA	287,476	+7.17%	268,248	+17.31%	228,660
15	Amarillo, TX MSA	276,235	+2.81%	268,691	+6.65%	251,933
16	Laredo, TX MSA	281,224	+5.28%	267,114	+6.72%	250,304
17	Tyler, TX MSA	252,549	+8.17%	233,479	+11.33%	209,714
18	Midland, TX MSA	193,139	+10.23%	175,220	+23.68%	141,671
19	Abilene, TX MSA	185,429	+5.01%	176,579	+6.85%	165,252
20	Odessa, TX MSA	173,801	+5.22%	165,171	+20.45%	137,130
21	Wichita Falls, TX MSA	149,448	+0.89%	148,128	−2.10%	151,306
22	Sherman–Denison, TX MSA	153,613	+13.33%	135,543	+12.13%	120,877
23	San Angelo, TX MSA	122,065	+0.45%	121,516	+8.67%	111,823
24	Victoria, TX MSA	99,864	+1.56%	98,331	+4.60%	94,003
25	Texarkana, TX-AR MSA (TX)	92,696	−0.21%	92,893	+0.35%	92,565
26	Lufkin, TX μSA	88,154	+2.04%	86,395	−0.43%	86,771
27	Athens, TX μSA	88,595	+7.85%	82,150	+4.61%	78,532
28	Huntsville, TX μSA	83,842	+9.74%	76,400	+12.58%	67,861
29	Granbury, TX μSA	70,501	+14.45%	61,598	+20.35%	51,182
30	Rio Grande City–Roma, TX μSA	66,319	+0.61%	65,920	+8.12%	60,968
31	Nacogdoches, TX μSA	66,035	+2.14%	64,653	+0.20%	64,524
32	Paris, TX μSA	63,319	+2.67%	61,675	−1.56%	62,653
33	Eagle Pass, TX MSA	58,823	+1.62%	57,887	+6.69%	54,258
34	Palestine, TX μSA	59,805	+3.25%	57,922	−0.92%	58,458
35	Mount Pleasant, TX μSA	57,076	+2.50%	55,684	−3.44%	57,669
36	Corsicana, TX μSA	57,181	+8.66%	52,624	+10.24%	47,735
37	Kerrville, TX μSA	54,037	+2.74%	52,598	+5.99%	49,625
38	Jacksonville, TX μSA	53,337	+5.80%	50,412	−0.85%	50,845
39	Del Rio, TX μSA	47,835	+0.52%	47,586	−2.65%	48,879
40	Alice, TX μSA	45,383	−1.27%	45,967	−4.36%	48,061
41	Stephenville, TX μSA	43,911	+3.21%	42,545	+12.29%	37,890
42	Gainesville, TX μSA	44,461	+6.70%	41,668	+8.41%	38,437
43	El Campo, TX μSA	42,060	+1.18%	41,570	+0.70%	41,280
44	Brownwood, TX μSA	38,711	+1.62%	38,095	−0.03%	38,106
45	Sulphur Springs, TX μSA	39,063	+6.19%	36,787	+4.62%	35,161
46	Bonham, TX μSA	39,265	+10.10%	35,662	+5.15%	33,915
47	Brenham, TX μSA	38,288	+6.93%	35,805	+6.19%	33,718
48	Plainview, TX μSA	36,700	−3.23%	37,924	−11.22%	42,719
49	Bay City, TX μSA	36,463	+0.57%	36,255	−1.22%	36,702
50	Beeville, TX μSA	32,515	+4.73%	31,047	−2.55%	31,861
51	Big Spring, TX μSA	30,504	−12.50%	34,860	−0.43%	35,012
52	Kingsville, TX μSA	30,315	−2.34%	31,040	−3.18%	32,061
53	Mineral Wells, TX μSA	30,791	+8.38%	28,409	+1.06%	28,111
54	Fredericksburg, TX μSA	28,527	+6.74%	26,725	+7.60%	24,837
55	Uvalde, TX μSA	24,963	+1.62%	24,564	−6.97%	26,405
56	Pampa, TX μSA	21,786	−1.22%	22,054	−6.01%	23,464
57	Dumas, TX μSA	21,891	+2.50%	21,358	−2.49%	21,904
58	Raymondville, TX μSA	19,971	−0.96%	20,164	−8.90%	22,134
59	Borger, TX μSA	19,633	−4.77%	20,617	−6.92%	22,150
60	Port Lavaca, TX μSA	19,599	−2.52%	20,106	−5.96%	21,381
61	Andrews, TX μSA	18,914	+1.63%	18,610	+25.86%	14,786
62	Hereford, TX μSA	18,626	+0.23%	18,583	−4.07%	19,372
63	Snyder, TX μSA	16,162	−4.55%	16,932	+0.07%	16,921
64	Sweetwater, TX μSA	14,117	−4.21%	14,738	−3.14%	15,216
65	Zapata, TX μSA	13,753	−0.98%	13,889	−0.92%	14,018
66	Vernon, TX μSA	12,481	−3.15%	12,887	−4.79%	13,535
67	Town of Pecos, TX μSA	12,138	−17.70%	14,748	+7.00%	13,783
	Texarkana, TX-AR MSA	146,816	−0.48%	147,519	−1.13%	149,198

== Combined statistical areas ==
The following table provides the in-state population ranking of each CSA along with its rate of population change over time.

The 13 combined statistical areas of the State of Texas (Note: For CSAs comprising populations from multiple states, they are listed twice to show both their intrastate population within that CSA as well as the CSA's total population. Only the intrastate population is ranked.)
2025 rank	Combined statistical area	Population				
2025 rank	Combined statistical area	2025 estimate	Change	2020 Census	Change	2010 Census
1	Dallas–Fort Worth, TX-OK CSA (TX)	9,000,627	+10.96%	8,111,828	+19.28%	6,800,492
2	Houston–Pasadena, TX CSA	8,105,280	+10.43%	7,339,672	+19.80%	6,126,361
3	San Antonio–New Braunfels–Kerrville, TX CSA	2,895,704	+9.79%	2,637,466	+18.97%	2,216,970
4	McAllen–Edinburg–Mission, TX CSA	987,868	+5.46%	936,701	+12.08%	835,737
5	El Paso–Las Cruces, TX-NM CSA (TX)	881,291	+1.43%	868,859	+8.05%	804,123
6	Corpus Christi–Kingsville–Alice, TX CSA	526,889	+0.79%	522,770	+2.85%	508,307
7	Brownsville–Harlingen–Raymondville, TX CSA	453,917	+2.89%	441,181	+2.99%	428,354
8	Lubbock–Plainview, TX CSA	405,131	+4.10%	389,192	+6.32%	366,047
9	Midland–Odessa–Andrews, TX CSA	385,854	+7.48%	359,001	+22.28%	293,587
10	Tyler–Jacksonville, TX CSA	305,886	+7.75%	283,891	+8.95%	260,559
11	Amarillo–Borger, TX CSA	295,868	+2.27%	289,308	+5.55%	274,083
12	Abilene–Sweetwater, TX CSA	199,546	+4.30%	191,317	+6.01%	180,468
13	Victoria–Port Lavaca, TX CSA	119,463	+0.87%	118,437	+2.65%	115,384
	Dallas-Fort Worth, TX–OK CSA	9,051,994	+10.96%	8,157,895	+19.22%	6,842,908
	El Paso-Las Cruces, TX–NM CSA	1,110,382	+2.02%	1,088,420	+7.41%	1,013,356

== See also ==
- Geography of Texas
  - Demographics of Texas
