= List of Texas metropolitan areas =

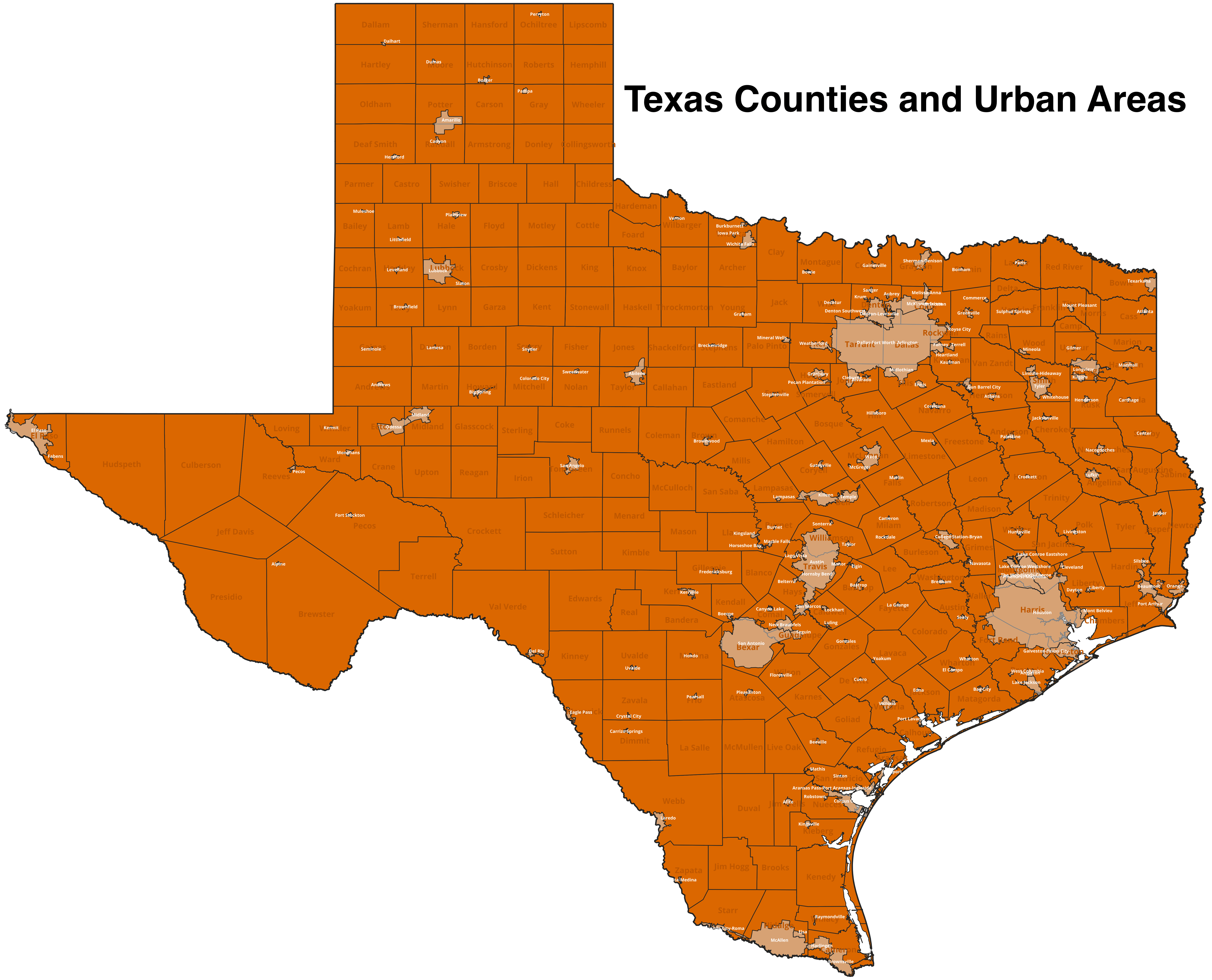
Texas Counties and urban areas

The following is a complete list of 25 metropolitan areas in Texas, as defined by the United States Office of Management and Budget. The largest two are ranked among the top 10 metropolitan areas in the U.S.

Some metropolitan areas contain metropolitan divisions. Two metropolitan divisions exist within the Dallas–Fort Worth–Arlington MSA. The term metropolitan division is used to refer to a county or group of counties within a metropolitan area that has a population core of at least 2.5 million. A metropolitan division often functions as a distinct social, economic, and cultural area within the larger region.

Texarkana is the only MSA in Texas that includes counties in adjacent states—there is a city with the same name directly across the border in Arkansas.

Population figures are as of the 2023 U.S. Census estimates.

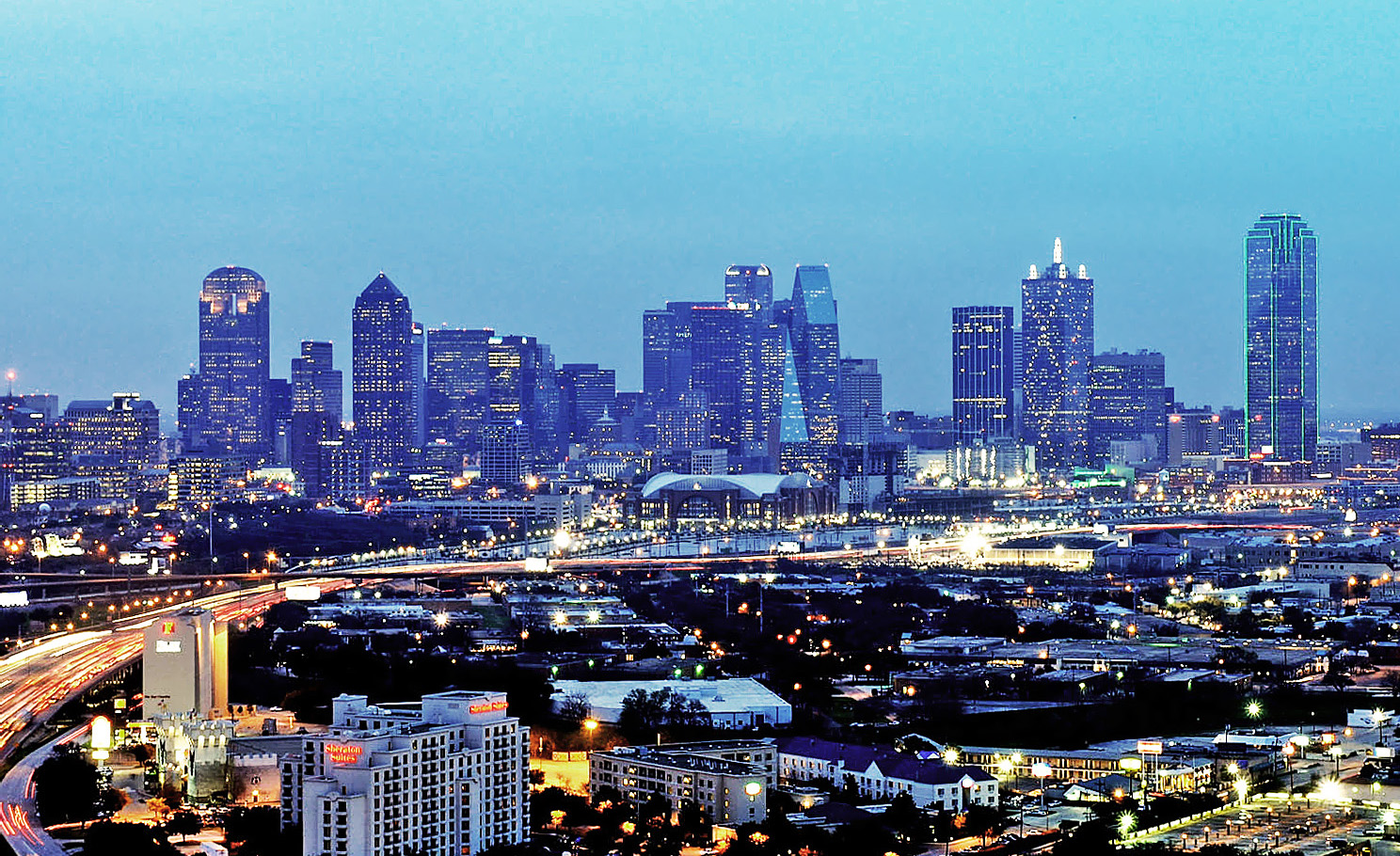
Dallas-Fort Worth

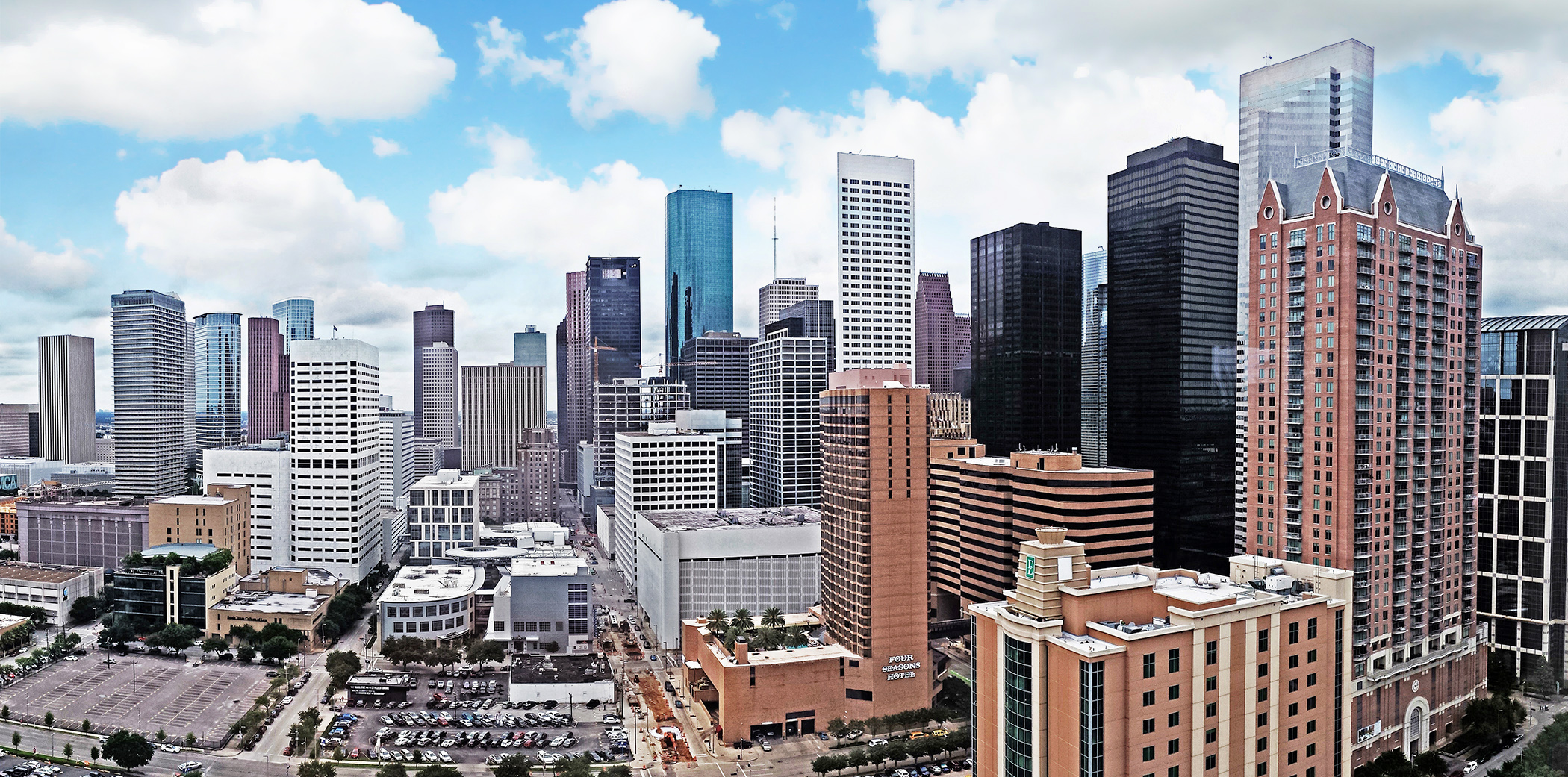
Houston

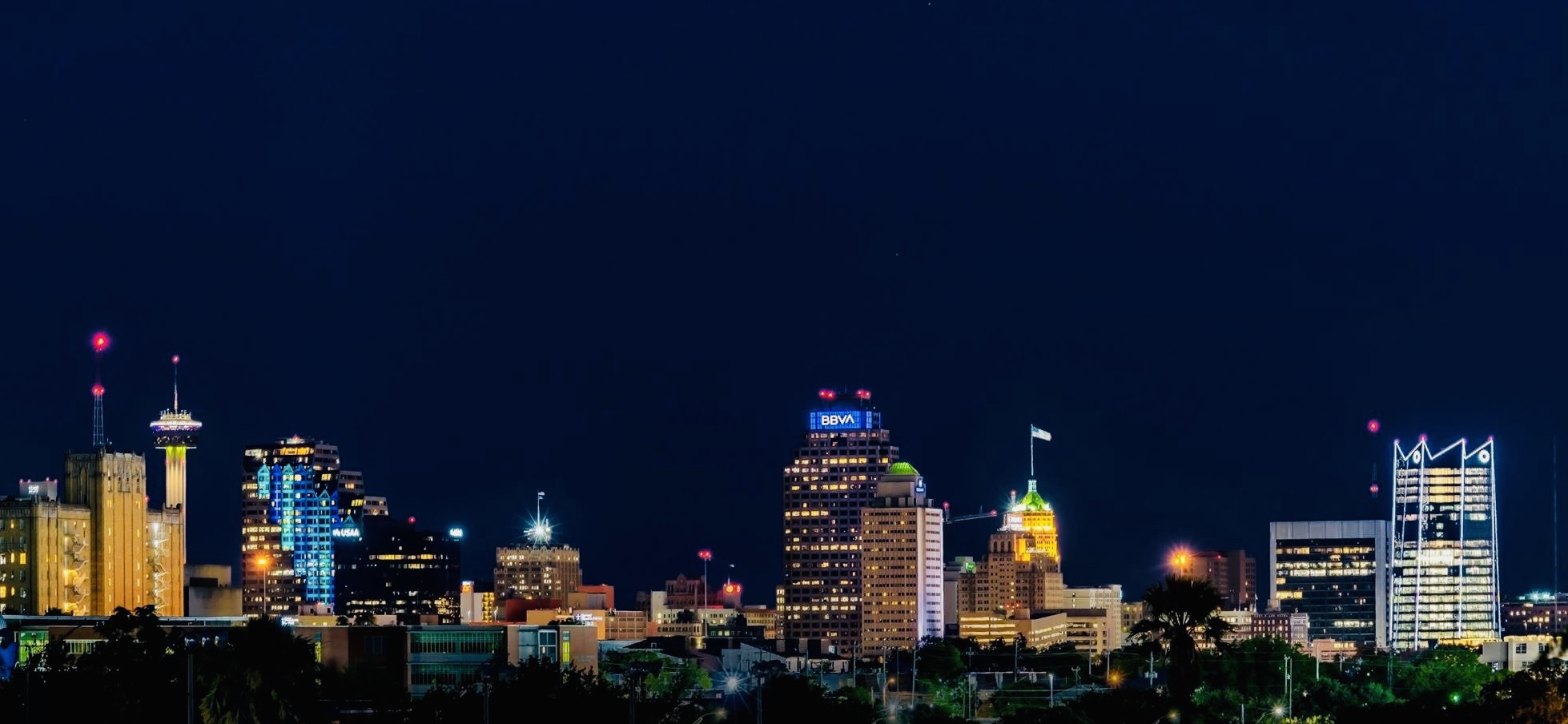
San Antonio

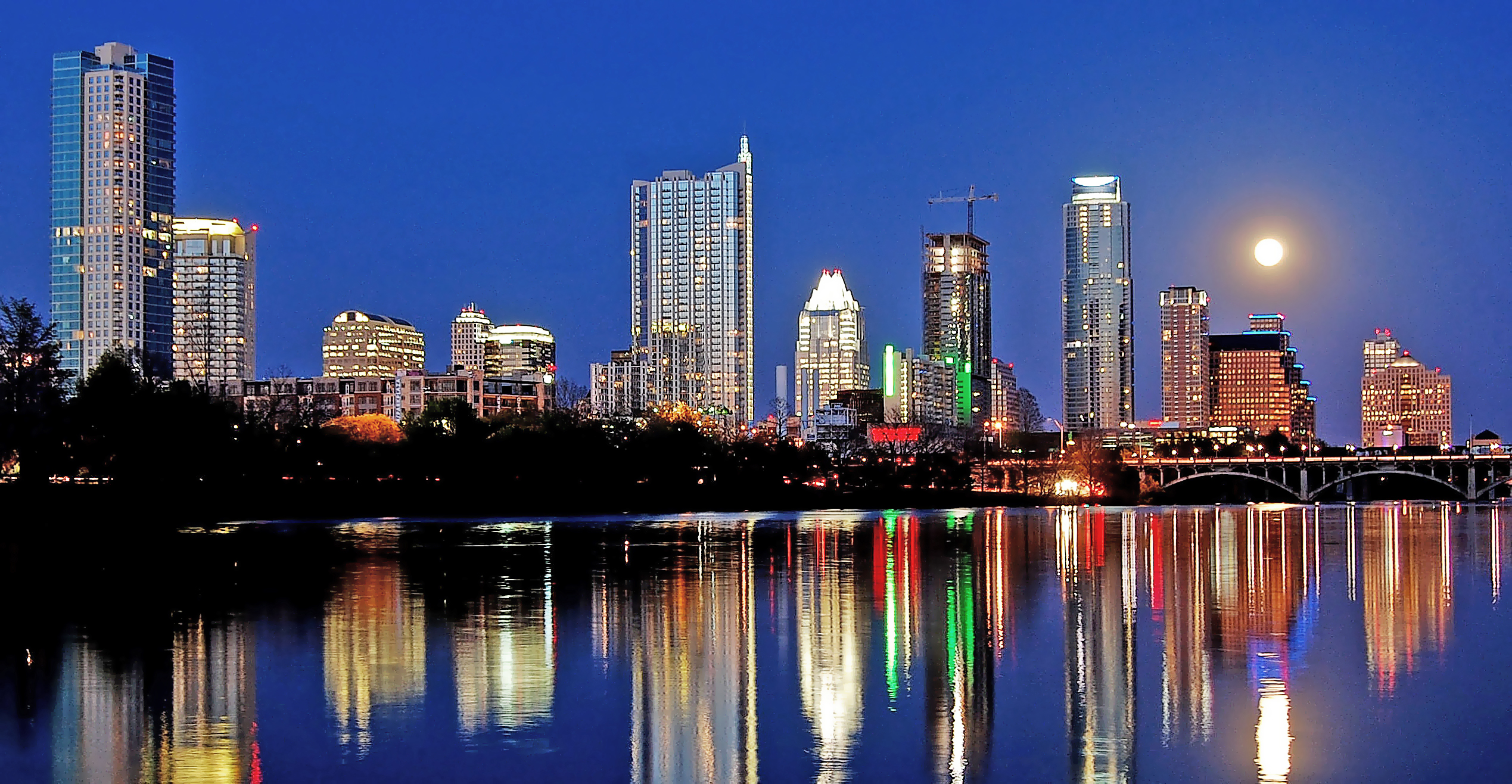
Austin

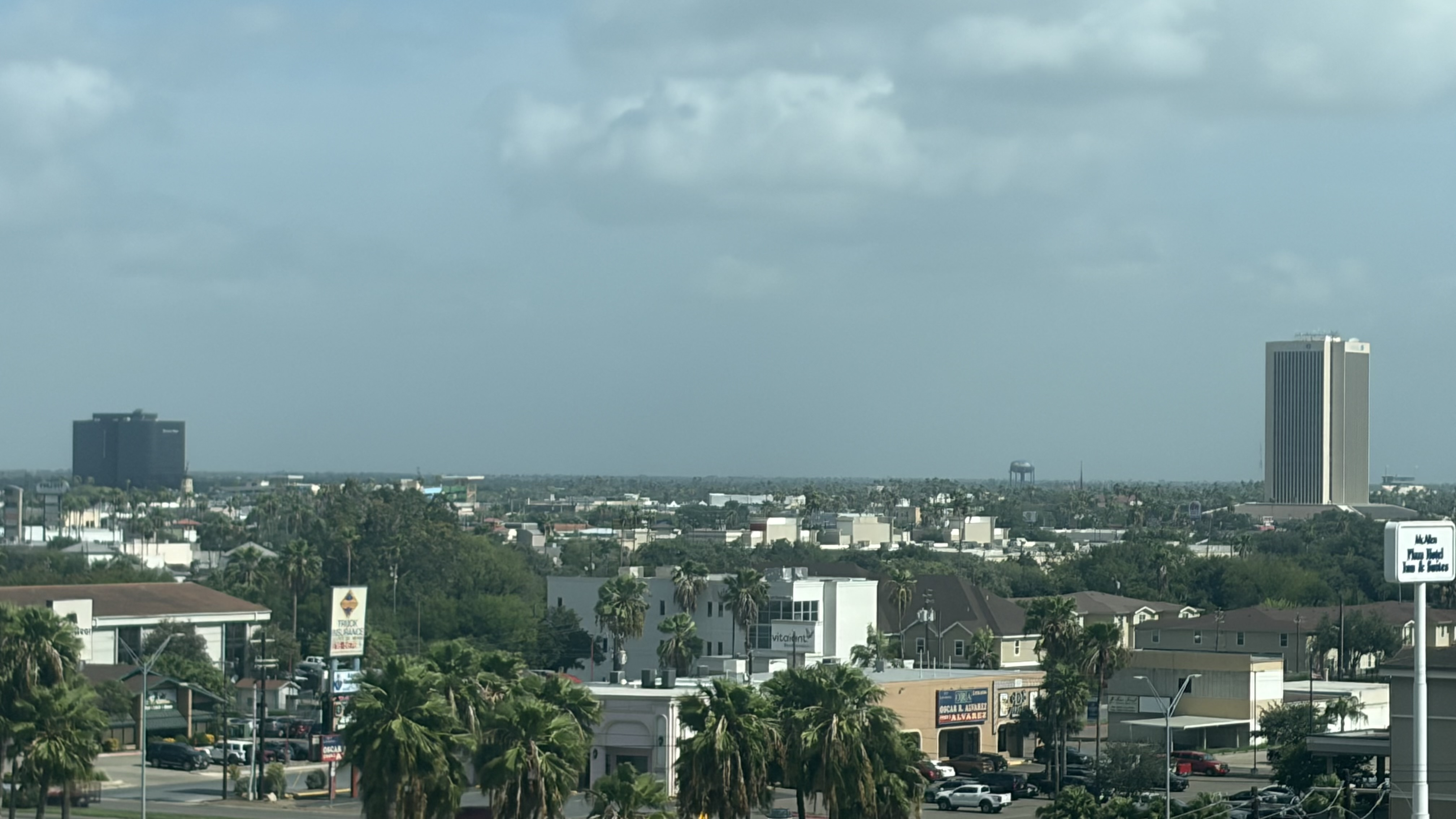
McAllen

Metropolitan areas
| Texas rank | U.S. rank | Metropolitan area | Metropolitan division | Population (2023 est.) |
|---|---|---|---|---|
| 1 | 4 | Dallas–Fort Worth | | 8,100,037 |
| 2 | 5 | Houston | | 7,510,253 |
| 3 | 24 | San Antonio | | 2,703,999 |
| 4 | 26 | Austin | | 2,473,275 |
| 5 | 65 | McAllen | | 898,471 |
| 6 | 68 | El Paso | | 873,331 |
| 7 | 110 | Killeen-Temple | | 501,333 |
| 8 | 121 | Corpus Christi | | 448,323 |
| 9 | 127 | Brownsville-Harlingen | | 426,710 |
| 10 | 140 | Beaumont-Port Arthur | | 395,479 |
| 11 | 155 | Lubbock | | 360,104 |
| 12 | 169 | Waco | | 304,865 |
| 13 | 173 | Longview | | 293,498 |
| 14 | 178 | College Station–Bryan | | 281,445 |
| 15 | 184 | Amarillo | | 272,395 |
| 16 | 186 | Laredo | | 269,148 |
| 17 | 197 | Tyler | | 245,209 |
| 18 | 243 | Midland | | 182,324 |
| 19 | 245 | Abilene | | 181,591 |
| 20 | 264 | Odessa | | 164,494 |
| 21 | 289 | Wichita Falls | | 149,947 |
| 22 | 292 | Sherman-Denison | | 146,907 |
| 23 | 293 | Texarkana, TX-AR | | 145,907 |
| 24 | 330 | San Angelo | | 120,606 |
| 25 | 366 | Victoria | | 98,808 |

== See also ==
- List of Texas micropolitan areas
- List of Texas cities
- Texas census statistical areas
