= Roosevelt, Lubbock County, Texas =

Unincorporated community in Texas, US

Coordinates: 33°34′53″N 101°40′28″W

Roosevelt is an unincorporated community in Lubbock County, Texas, United States. It sits at an elevation of 3136 feet (956 m). The community is part of the Lubbock metropolitan area. It mainly consists of Roosevelt High school. Also, a Baptist church is located In the community.
