= Miami Independent School District =

School district in Texas

Miami Independent School District is a public school district based in Miami, Texas (USA).

It covers most of Roberts County, and a small portion of the district extends into Gray County.

Miami ISD has one school that serves students in grades pre-kindergarten through twelve.

In 2009, the school district was rated "recognized" by the Texas Education Agency.

== History ==
A former high school building was rendered useless after a 1969 tornado, so a new facility was built after that.

In 2007 Donna Hale, of the Miami High School class of 1994, became the superintendent, but left the school prior to the 2023-2024 academic year.

The voters approved a bond for $32 million for a new 124,000-square-foot (11,500 m^{2}) school building in 2014; the decision of the rural Miami community to maintain its own school district and build a new school contrasts with other area communities which instead chose to consolidate with other area school districts.

By 2017 the Miami ISD high school section began an early college program where students may take tertiary courses and receive associates degrees while graduating from high school.
