= Acuff, Texas =

- Unincorporated community
- Downtown Acuff, Texas

- Location within Texas Location within the United States
- Coordinates: 33°35′42″N 101°37′13″W
- Country: United States
- State: Texas
- County: Lubbock
- Region: Llano Estacado
- Established: 1891
- Founder: Michael S. Acuff
- Elevation: 3,140 ft (960 m)

Population (2010)
  - Total: 30
- Time zone: UTC-6 (CST)
- ZIP code: 79403
- Area code: 806
- Website: Handbook of Texas

Acuff is an unincorporated farming community in northeastern Lubbock County, Texas, United States. According to the Handbook of Texas, the community had a population of 30 in 2000. It is part of the Lubbock metropolitan area.

== History ==
The community was named for a local man, Michael S. Acuff. A post office operated in Acuff from 1903 to 1912. Baptist and Methodist services were held in the same church building in the 1940s.

Acuff is close to the Lubbock International Dragway.

Historical population
Year	Pop.	±%
1930	25	—
1940	25	+0.0%
1950	50	+100.0%
1960	50	+0.0%
1990	30	−40.0%

== Geography ==
Acuff is located at the intersection of Farm to Market Roads 40 and 789, 10 mi (16 km) east of Lubbock in east-central Lubbock County.

== Education ==
The first school at Acuff was built in 1902, and the second was built in 1924. The community was incorporated into the Roosevelt Independent School District in 1947.

== Notable people ==
- The Maines Brothers Band produced an album named after the community.
