= Midland metropolitan area, Texas =

Metropolitan area in West Texas

Midland, Texas Midland, TX Metropolitan Statistical Area
- Metropolitan statistical area
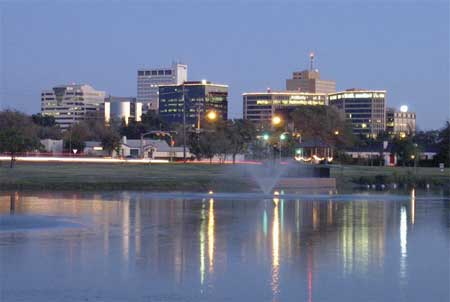
- Downtown Midland in 2007
Midland–Odessa–Andrews, TX CSA
Midland MSA
Odessa MSA
Andrews µSA
City of Midland
City of Odessa
- Country: United States
- State: Texas
- Principal city: Midland
- Time zone: UTC−6 (CST)
  - Summer (DST): UTC−5 (CDT)

The Midland Metropolitan Statistical Area, as defined by the United States Census Bureau, is an area consisting of two counties – Midland and Martin– in West Texas, anchored by the city of Midland. As of the 2020 census, the MSA had a population of 175,220. The metropolitan area is also the fifth largest economy in Texas, with a 2024 gross domestic product of $53.7 billion.

The Midland Metropolitan Statistical Area is also a component of the Midland–Odessa–Andrews Combined Statistical Area, which covers four counties (Midland, Ector, Andrews, and Martin) with a population of 385,854 as of 2025.

== Counties ==
- Martin
- Midland

== Communities ==
- Greenwood (unincorporated)
- City of Midland (Principal City)
- City of Odessa (mostly in Ector County)

== Demographics ==
| County | Seat | 2025 estimate | 2020 Census | Change | Land area | Density |
|---|---|---|---|---|---|---|
| Midland | Midland | 187,855 | 169,983 | +10.51% | 902 sq mi (2,336 km^{2}) | 208/sq mi (80/km^{2}) |
| Martin | Stanton | 5,284 | 5,237 | +0.90% | 916 sq mi (2,372 km^{2}) | 6/sq mi (2/km^{2}) |
| Total | | 193,139 | 175,220 | +10.23% | 1,818 sq mi (4,709 km^{2}) | 106/sq mi (41/km^{2}) |

== See also ==
- Texas census statistical areas
