= Reese Center, Texas =

- Former CDP
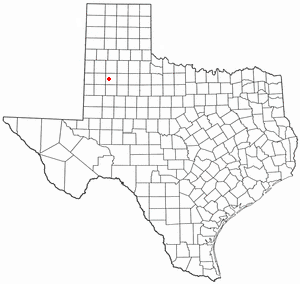
- Location of Reese Center, Texas

- Coordinates: 33°35′36″N 102°1′48″W
- Country: United States
- State: Texas
- County: Lubbock

Area
  - Total: 6.5 sq mi (16.9 km^{2})
  - Land: 6.5 sq mi (16.9 km^{2})
  - Water: 0 sq mi (0.0 km^{2})

Population (2000)
  - Total: 42
  - Density: 6.5/sq mi (2.5/km^{2})
- Time zone: UTC-6 (Central (CST))
  - Summer (DST): UTC-5 (CDT)
- FIPS code: 48-61406

Reese Center is an unincorporated community and former census-designated place (CDP) in Lubbock County, Texas, United States. The population was 42 at the 2000 census. Its population was not recorded separately for the 2010 census. It is part of the Lubbock Metropolitan Statistical Area.

== Geography ==
Reese Center is located at 33°35′36″N 102°1′48″W (33.593363, -102.030076). The community is bordered by the former Reese Air Force Base to the west and by the city of Lubbock to the south and east.

According to the United States Census Bureau, the CDP had a total area of 6.5 square miles (17 km^{2}), all land.

On June 5, 2025, a large tornado impacted the area.

== Demographics ==
Historical population
Census	Pop.	Note	%±
2000	42		—
U.S. Decennial Census; 1850–1900 1910; 1920 1930 1940; 1950 1960 1970; 1980 1990 2000; 2010

Reese Center first appeared in the 2000 U.S. census and includes parts of the Reese Air Force Base which was closed in 1997. It was deleted prior to the 2010 U.S. census.

Reese Center CDP, Texas – Racial and ethnic composition Note: the US Census treats Hispanic/Latino as an ethnic category. This table excludes Latinos from the racial categories and assigns them to a separate category. Hispanics/Latinos may be of any race.
Race / Ethnicity (NH = Non-Hispanic)	Pop 2000	% 2000
White alone (NH)	35	83.33%
Black or African American alone (NH)	0	0.00%
Native American or Alaska Native alone (NH)	1	2.38%
Asian alone (NH)	0	0.00%
Pacific Islander alone (NH)	0	0.00%
Other race alone (NH)	0	0.00%
Mixed race or Multiracial (NH)	0	0.00%
Hispanic or Latino (any race)	6	14.29%
Total	42	100.00%

As of the census of 2000, there were 42 people, 13 households, and 10 families residing in the CDP. The population density was 6.4 people per square mile (2.5/km^{2}). There were 14 housing units at an average density of 2.1/sq mi (0.8/km^{2}). The racial makeup of the CDP was 95.24% White, 2.38% Native American, 2.38% from other races. Hispanic or Latino of any race were 14.29% of the population.

There were 13 households, out of which 69.2% had children under the age of 18 living with them, 84.6% were married couples living together, and 15.4% were non-families. 15.4% of all households were made up of individuals, and 7.7% had someone living alone who was 65 years of age or older. The average household size was 3.23 and the average family size was 3.55.

In the CDP the population was spread out, with 38.1% under the age of 18, 40.5% from 25 to 44, 11.9% from 45 to 64, and 9.5% who were 65 years of age or older. The median age was 34 years. For every 100 females, there were 133.3 males. For every 100 females age 18 and over, there were 136.4 males.

The median income for a household in the CDP was $23,750, and the median income for a family was $12,292. Males had a median income of $11,250 versus $11,250 for females. The per capita income for the CDP was $7,393. None of the population or families were below the poverty line.

== See also ==
- Reese Technology Center
