= Roberts County, Texas =

County in Texas, United States

- County
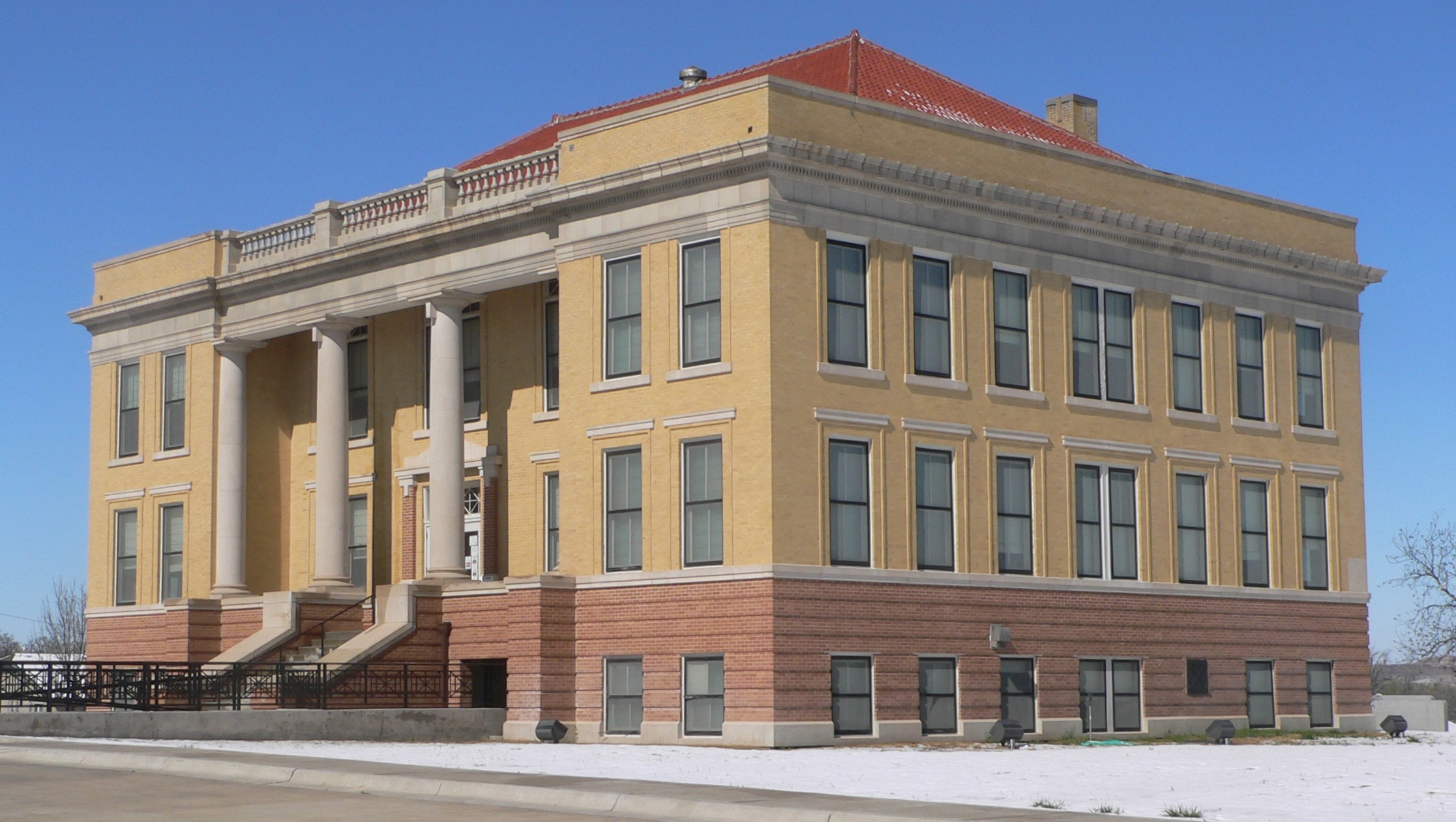
- Roberts County courthouse in Miami

- Location within the U.S. state of Texas
- Coordinates: 35°50′N 100°49′W
- Country: United States
- State: Texas
- Founded: 1889
- Named for: John S. Roberts and Oran Milo Roberts
- Seat: Miami
- Largest city: Miami

Area
  - Total: 924 sq mi (2,390 km^{2})
  - Land: 924 sq mi (2,390 km^{2})
  - Water: 0.1 sq mi (0.26 km^{2}) 0.01%

Population (2020)
  - Total: 827
  - Estimate (2025): 867 ▲
  - Density: 1/sq mi (0.39/km^{2})
- Time zone: UTC−6 (Central)
  - Summer (DST): UTC−5 (CDT)
- Congressional district: 13th
- Website: www.co.roberts.tx.us

Roberts County is a county located in the U.S. state of Texas. As of the 2020 census, its population was 827, making it the eighth-least populous county in Texas. Its county seat is Miami, which is also the county's only incorporated community. The county was created in 1876 and organized in 1889. It is named for Oran Milo Roberts, a governor of Texas. Roberts County is one of three prohibition (entirely dry) counties remaining in Texas.

== History ==
The Plains Apache inhabited the Texas Panhandle until they were displaced by the Comanche, who dominated the area until the 1870s. The Comanche hunted the large herds of buffalo, which grazed on the prairie. In the Red River War of 1874–75, United States Army troops led by Ranald S. Mackenzie drove out the Comanches. Simultaneously, buffalo hunters killed the large herds in the area, destroying the food supply and livelihood of the Plains tribes, making way for permanent settlement by Anglo-Americans.

In 1876, Roberts County was carved from the Bexar Territory and the Clay Land District. In 1887, the Southern Kansas Railway was built through Roberts County, and settlers followed.

Roberts County is the scene of a recent battle for water rights, where the City of Amarillo, Texas, the Canadian River Municipal Water Authority, and T. Boone Pickens have sought to purchase the water rights within the county. Between the three, they own 80% of the water rights.

== Geography ==
According to the U.S. Census Bureau, the county has a total area of 924 sq mi (2,390 km^{2}), of which 0.1 sq mi (0.26 km^{2}) (0.01%) is covered by water.

The county is relatively flat except for the Canadian River valley. Most of the land is used for cattle ranching. The county contains the 68,000-acre (280 km^{2}) Mesa Vista Ranch, which seeks to protect quail, dove, and pheasant habitat along the creek beds south of the Canadian River.

=== Major highways ===
- U.S. Highway 60
- State Highway 70

=== Adjacent counties ===
- Ochiltree County (north)
- Lipscomb County northeast)
- Hemphill County (east)
- Gray County (south)
- Carson County (southwest)
- Hutchinson County (west)
- Hansford County (northwest)
- Wheeler County (southeast)

== Demographics ==
Historical population
Census	Pop.	Note	%±
1880	32		—
1890	326		918.8%
1900	620		90.2%
1910	950		53.2%
1920	1,469		54.6%
1930	1,457		−0.8%
1940	1,289		−11.5%
1950	1,031		−20.0%
1960	1,075		4.3%
1970	967		−10.0%
1980	1,187		22.8%
1990	1,025		−13.6%
2000	887		−13.5%
2010	929		4.7%
2020	827		−11.0%
2025 (est.)	867	▲	4.8%
U.S. Decennial Census; 1850–1900 1910; 1920 1930 1940; 1950 1960 1970; 1980 1990 2000; 2010 2020

=== Racial and ethnic composition ===
Roberts County, Texas – Racial and ethnic composition Note: the US Census treats Hispanic/Latino as an ethnic category. This table excludes Latinos from the racial categories and assigns them to a separate category. Hispanics/Latinos may be of any race.
Race / Ethnicity (NH = Non-Hispanic)	Pop 2000	Pop 2010	Pop 2020	% 2000	% 2010	% 2020
White alone (NH)	850	929	717	95.83%	90.53%	86.70%
Black or African American alone (NH)	3	0	2	0.34%	0.00%	0.24%
Native American or Alaska Native alone (NH)	0	3	2	0.00%	0.32%	0.24%
Asian alone (NH)	1	2	0	0.11%	0.22%	0.00%
Pacific Islander alone (NH)	0	0	0	0.00%	0.00%	0.00%
Other race alone (NH)	0	0	1	0.00%	0.00%	0.12%
Multiracial (NH)	5	9	55	0.56%	0.97%	6.65%
Hispanic or Latino (any race)	28	74	50	3.16%	7.97%	6.05%
Total	887	929	827	100.00%	100.00%	100.00%

=== 2020 census ===
As of the 2020 census, the county had a population of 827. The median age was 41.5 years; 24.3% of residents were under 18 and 21.6% were 65 age or older. For every 100 females, there were 99.3 males, and for every 100 females 18 and over, there were 97.5 males 18 and over.

The racial makeup of the county was 89.1% White, 0.2% Black or African American, 0.4% American Indian and Alaska Native, <0.1% Asian, <0.1% Native Hawaiian and Pacific Islander, 1.6% from some other race, and 8.7% from two or more races. Hispanic or Latino residents of any race comprised 6.0% of the population.

No residents of Roberts County lived in urban areas as of the 2020 census, while all residents lived in rural areas.

Of the 339 households in the county, 31.9% had children under 18 living in them, 58.1% were married-couple households, 21.2% were households with a male householder and no spouse or partner present, and 16.8% were households with a female householder and no spouse or partner present. About 21.2% of all households were made up of individuals, and 7.6% had someone living alone who was 65 or older.

The county had 430 housing units, of which 21.2% were vacant. Among occupied housing units, 82.9% were owner-occupied and 17.1% were renter-occupied. The homeowner vacancy rate was 1.0% and the rental vacancy rate was 33.7%.

=== 2000 census ===
As of the 2000 census, 887 people, 362 households, and 275 families were residing in the county. The population density was less than 1/km^{2} (2.6/mi^{2}). The 449 housing units averaged less than 1 per square mile (0.39/km^{2}). The racial makeup of the county was 96.51% White, 0.34% African American, 0.56% Native American, 0.11% Asian, 1.35% from other races, and 1.13% from two or more races. About 3.16% of the population was Hispanic or Latino of any race.

Of the 362 households, 31.8% had children under 18 living with them, 70.7% were married couples living together, 3.9% had a female householder with no husband present, and 24.0% were not families. About 23.8% of all households were made up of individuals, and 10.8% had someone living alone who was 65 or older. The average household size was 2.45, and the average family size was 2.88.

In the county, the age distribution was 25.0% under 18, 4.8% from 18 to 24, 24.8% from 25 to 44, 30.9% from 45 to 64, and 14.4% who were 65 or older. The median age was 42 years. For every 100 females, there were 100.20 males. For every 100 females age 18 and over, there were 97.30 males.

The median income for a household in the county was $44,792, and for a family was $50,400. Males had a median income of $33,125 versus $23,611 for females. The per capita income for the county was $20,923. About 5.00% of families and 7.20% of the population were below the poverty line, including 7.50% of those under 18 and 5.50% of those 65 or over.

=== Ancestry ===
The largest self-reported ancestry groups in Roberts County, Texas are:

- 23.7% English
- 18.4% German
- 15.2% Irish
- 8.8% American
- 2.0% Scots-Irish
- 1.0% Polish
- 1.0% Russian
- 0.9% Czech
- 0.9% Welsh
- 0.7% Dutch
- 0.5% French

== Government and politics ==
United States presidential election results for Roberts County, Texas
Year	Republican		Democratic		Third party(ies)	
Year	No.	%	No.	%	No.	%
1912	16	6.75%	183	77.22%	38	16.03%
1916	27	10.76%	220	87.65%	4	1.59%
1920	60	25.10%	173	72.38%	6	2.51%
1924	104	29.97%	241	69.45%	2	0.58%
1928	243	70.03%	104	29.97%	0	0.00%
1932	36	7.33%	451	91.85%	4	0.81%
1936	27	5.96%	426	94.04%	0	0.00%
1940	55	11.80%	408	87.55%	3	0.64%
1944	89	21.29%	289	69.14%	40	9.57%
1948	76	18.18%	317	75.84%	25	5.98%
1952	379	80.64%	91	19.36%	0	0.00%
1956	279	69.92%	118	29.57%	2	0.50%
1960	339	76.18%	104	23.37%	2	0.45%
1964	297	60.00%	198	40.00%	0	0.00%
1968	311	60.51%	90	17.51%	113	21.98%
1972	467	84.91%	71	12.91%	12	2.18%
1976	350	62.28%	202	35.94%	10	1.78%
1980	482	75.08%	150	23.36%	10	1.56%
1984	539	83.57%	106	16.43%	0	0.00%
1988	441	75.90%	135	23.24%	5	0.86%
1992	391	63.37%	126	20.42%	100	16.21%
1996	421	72.09%	122	20.89%	41	7.02%
2000	472	85.97%	72	13.11%	5	0.91%
2004	461	90.93%	46	9.07%	0	0.00%
2008	477	92.08%	41	7.92%	0	0.00%
2012	468	92.13%	33	6.50%	7	1.38%
2016	524	94.58%	20	3.61%	10	1.81%
2020	529	96.18%	17	3.09%	4	0.73%
2024	547	95.63%	20	3.50%	5	0.87%

United States Senate election results for Roberts County, Texas1
Year	Republican		Democratic		Third party(ies)	
Year	No.	%	No.	%	No.	%
2024	542	94.92%	20	3.50%	9	1.58%

United States Senate election results for Roberts County, Texas2
Year	Republican		Democratic		Third party(ies)	
Year	No.	%	No.	%	No.	%
2020	526	96.51%	15	2.75%	4	0.73%

Texas Gubernatorial election results for Roberts County
Year	Republican		Democratic		Third party(ies)	
Year	No.	%	No.	%	No.	%
2022	430	96.85%	7	1.58%	7	1.58%

Roberts County was one of the earliest counties in Texas to begin supporting the Republican Party. The last Democrat to win the county in a presidential election was Harry S. Truman in 1948, when he carried nearly 76% of its ballots. No Democrat has since exceeded the 40% of the vote that Texas native Lyndon B. Johnson won in the county in his 1964 national landslide. Jimmy Carter in 1976 was the last Democrat to win even 30% of the county's vote, Bill Clinton in 1996 to win 20%, Al Gore in 2000 to win 10%, and Barack Obama in 2012 to win 5%.

In recent years, Roberts County has become almost unanimously Republican. In 2008, 92% of voters voted for Republican John McCain versus only 7.92% for Democrat Barack Obama, making it one of the most Republican counties in the United States. In the 2016 presidential election, Republican Donald Trump received 94.58% of the vote, the largest margin in a county for a Republican in the U.S. that election. Roberts was again Trump's strongest county in 2020, and he won it by an even stronger margin: 96.2%.

The county is governed by an elected county judge and four commissioners (each elected by a precinct within the county).

Roberts County is located within District 88 of the Texas House of Representatives. Roberts County is located within District 31 of the Texas Senate.

== Communities ==
- Miami (county seat)
- Wayside

== Education ==
School districts include Miami Independent School District and Pampa Independent School District.

Roberts County is in the service area of Frank Phillips College (known in legislation as Borger Junior College).

== See also ==
- Dry counties
- List of museums in the Texas Panhandle
- National Register of Historic Places listings in Roberts County, Texas
- Recorded Texas Historic Landmarks in Roberts County
