= Wayside, Lynn County, Texas =

Unincorporated community in Lynn County, Texas, United States

- Unincorporated community
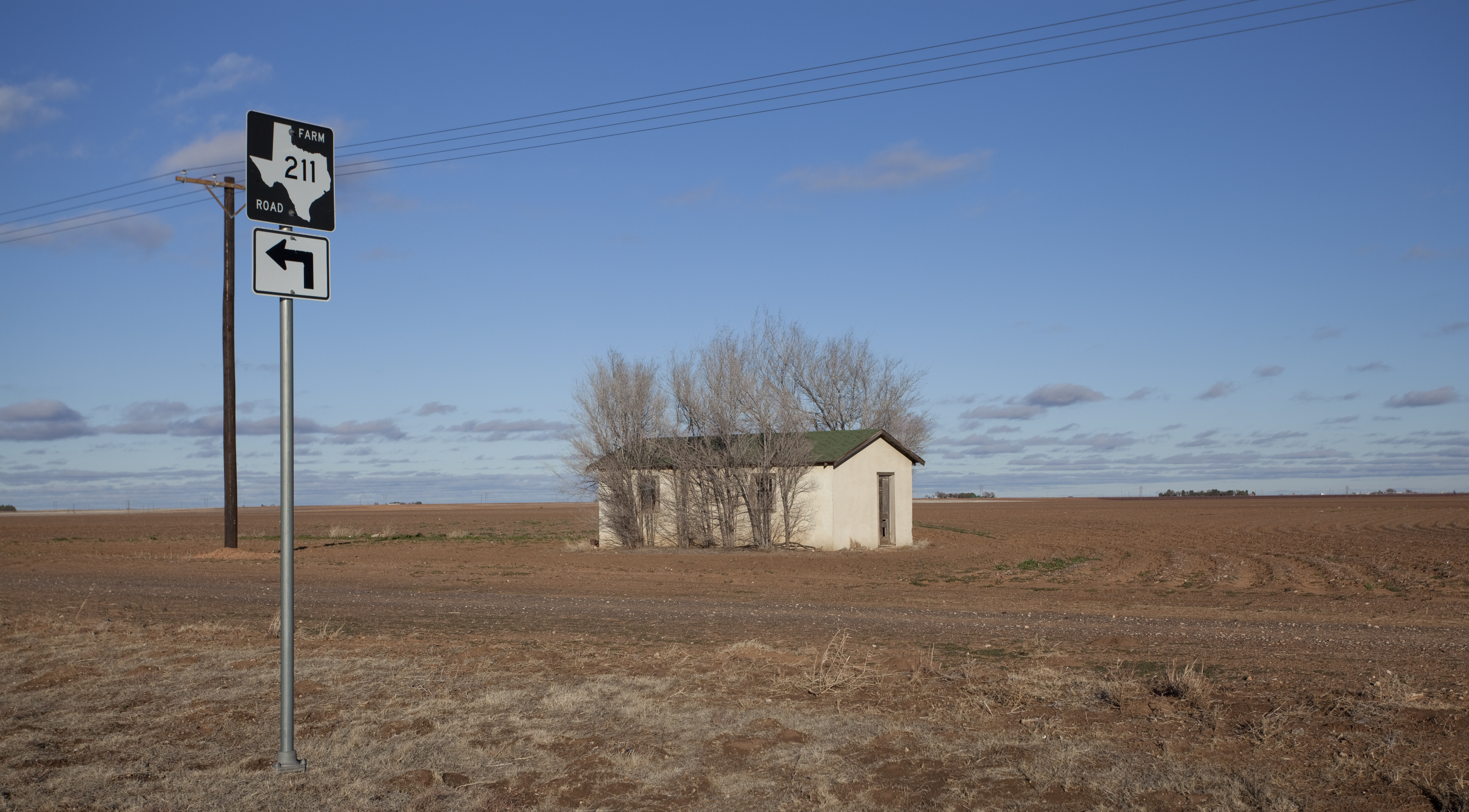
- Abandoned shack in Wayside, December 2011

- Location of Wayside in Texas Wayside (the United States)
- Coordinates: 33°19′37″N 101°48′26″W
- Country: United States
- State: Texas
- County: Lynn
- Region: Llano Estacado
- Elevation: 3,169 ft (966 m)
- Time zone: UTC-6 (CST)
- ZIP code: 79373
- Area code: 806

Wayside is a small unincorporated community in Lynn County, Texas, United States. Today, the community is best described as a ghost town, with only a few farms and ranches scattered across the area.

== Geography ==
In the state of Texas, there are six small communities that share the name Wayside. On the high plains of the Llano Estacado is Wayside (Armstrong County), Wayside (Roberts County), and Wayside (Lynn County). The other three communities, which lie in Central Texas, include Wayside (Bastrop County), Wayside (Wood County) and Wayside (Panola County).

Wayside (Armstrong County) is located approximately 100 miles (161 km) to the north and Wayside (Roberts County) is approximately 270 miles (435 km) to the north-northeast of Wayside (Lynn County).

The remnants of Wayside (Lynn County) lie on the high plains at an altitude of 3,169 feet (966 m) in north-central Lynn County at the intersection of Farm to Market Road 211 and U.S. Highway 87. The nearest major city is Lubbock, located 25 mi (40 km) to the north.

== See also ==
- List of ghost towns in Texas
- Caprock Escarpment
