= Miami, Texas =

- City
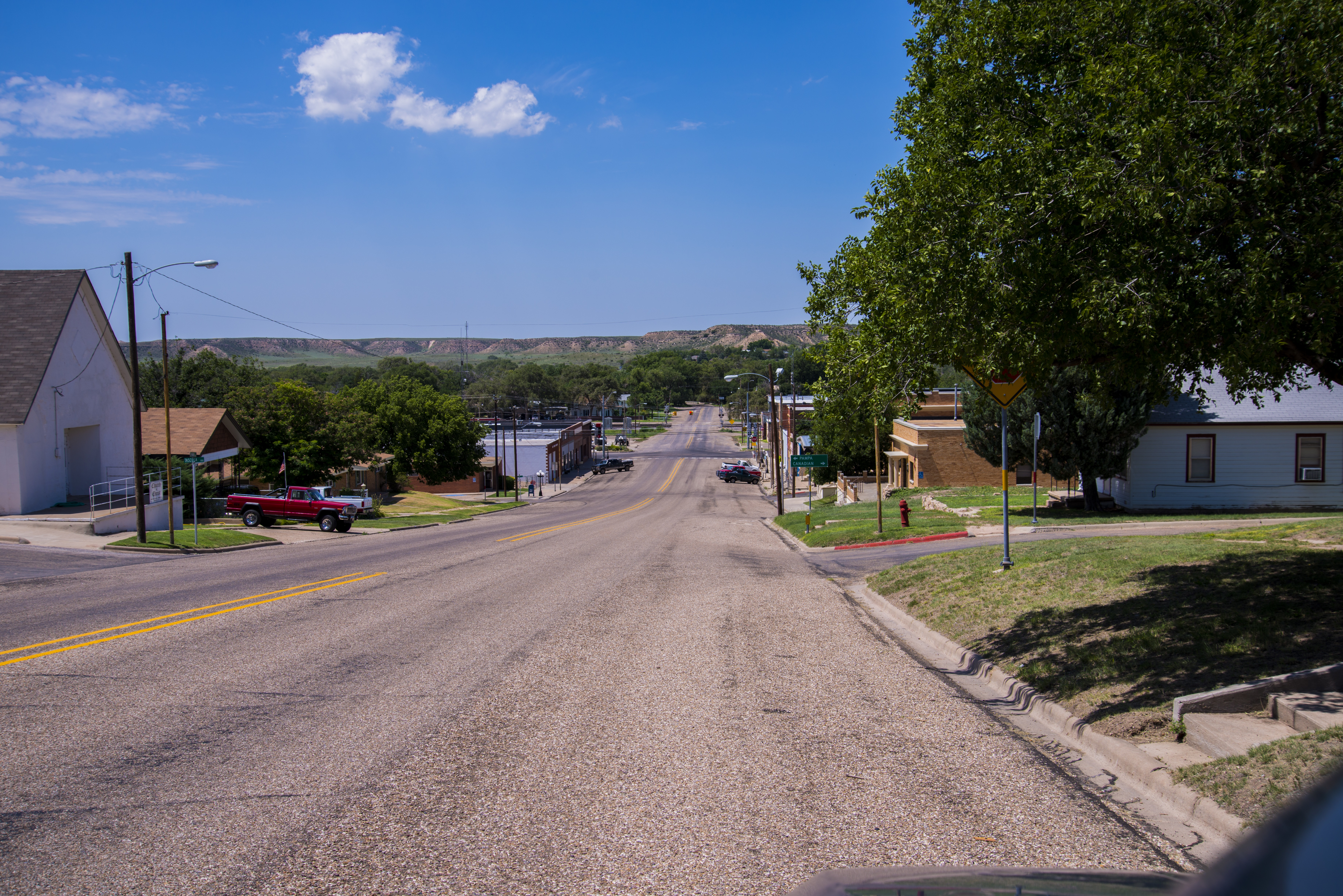
- Looking north through Miami along Main Street

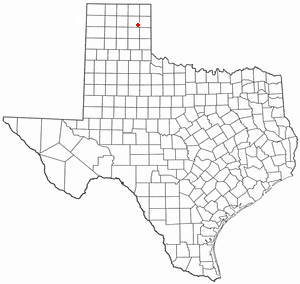
- Location of Miami, Texas

- Coordinates: 35°41′32″N 100°38′30″W
- Country: United States
- State: Texas
- County: Roberts

Area
  - Total: 1.17 sq mi (3.03 km^{2})
  - Land: 1.17 sq mi (3.03 km^{2})
  - Water: 0 sq mi (0.00 km^{2})
- Elevation: 2,736 ft (834 m)

Population (2020)
  - Total: 539
  - Density: 461/sq mi (178/km^{2})
- Time zone: UTC−6 (Central (CST))
  - Summer (DST): UTC−5 (CDT)
- ZIP code: 79059
- Area code: 806
- FIPS code: 48-47988
- GNIS feature ID: 2411094

Miami (/maɪˈæmə/ my-AM-ə) is a city in Roberts County, Texas, United States. It is part of the Pampa, Texas micropolitan statistical area. Its population was 539 at the 2020 census. It is the county seat of Roberts County, as well as the only municipality in the county. The Roberts County Museum, located in Miami, contains many interesting artifacts and history of the county. Residences are mainly single family homes. Miami has become noted for its annual cow calling contest, which occurs the first weekend in June and has been going for over 75 years.

== Geography ==
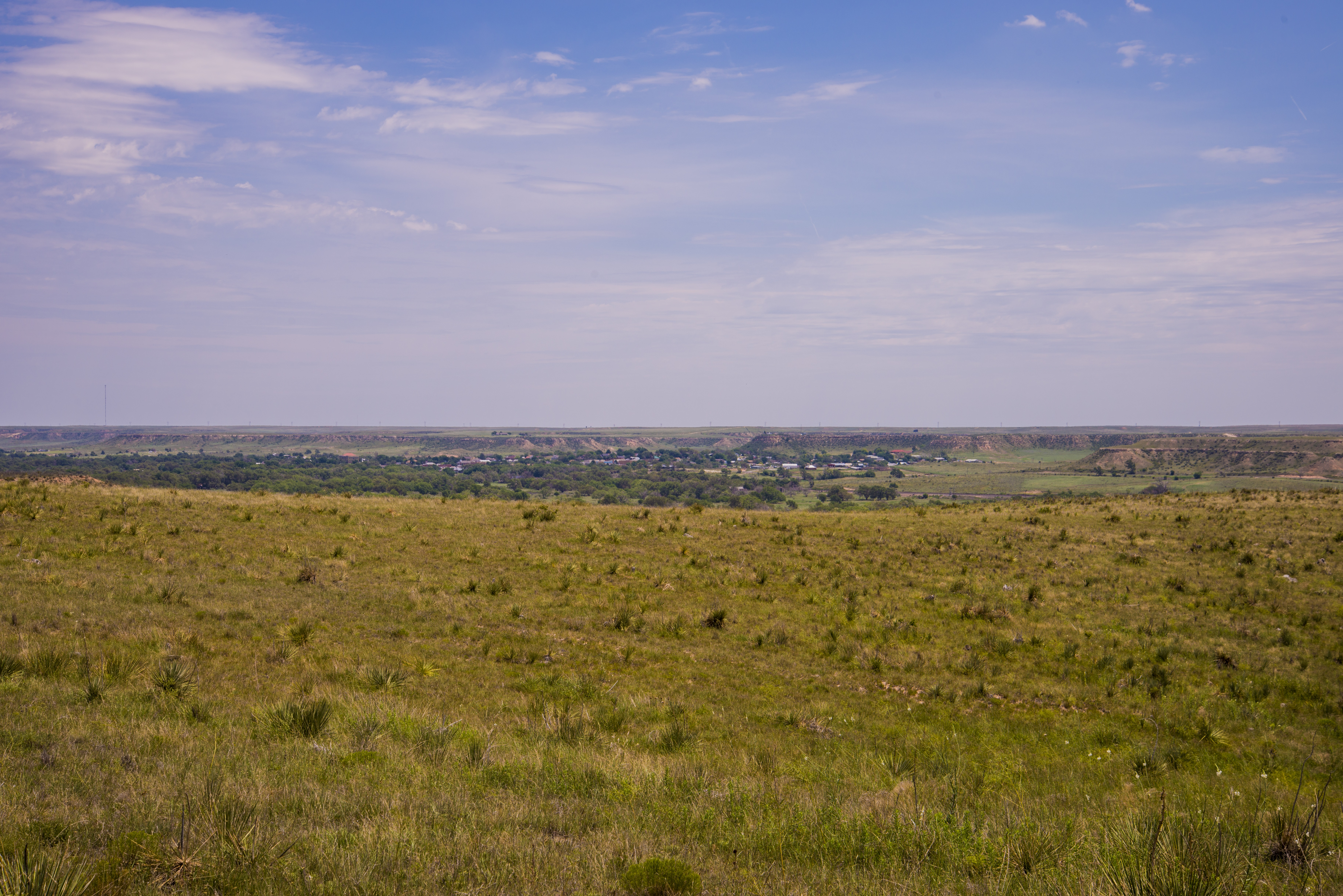
Overlooking Miami from the north

== Demographics ==
Historical population
Census	Pop.	Note	%±
1920	935		—
1930	953		1.9%
1940	713		−25.2%
1950	646		−9.4%
1960	656		1.5%
1970	611		−6.9%
1980	813		33.1%
1990	675		−17.0%
2000	588		−12.9%
2010	597		1.5%
2020	539		−9.7%
U.S. Decennial Census; 2020 Census

=== Racial and ethnic composition ===
Racial composition as of the 2020 census
Race	Number	Percent
White	473	87.8%
Black or African American	0	0.0%
American Indian and Alaska Native	2	0.4%
Asian	0	0.0%
Native Hawaiian and Other Pacific Islander	0	0.0%
Some other race	11	2.0%
Two or more races	53	9.8%
Hispanic or Latino (of any race)	39	7.2%

=== 2020 census ===
As of the 2020 census, Miami had a population of 539. The median age was 40.5 years. 24.7% of residents were under the age of 18 and 20.4% of residents were 65 years of age or older. For every 100 females there were 96.7 males, and for every 100 females age 18 and over there were 97.1 males age 18 and over.

0.0% of residents lived in urban areas, while 100.0% lived in rural areas.

Of the 230 households in Miami, 137 were families; 32.6% had children under the age of 18 living in them. Of all households, 53.0% were married-couple households, 23.5% were households with a male householder and no spouse or partner present, and 19.1% were households with a female householder and no spouse or partner present. About 23.5% of all households were made up of individuals and 9.1% had someone living alone who was 65 years of age or older.

There were 281 housing units, of which 18.1% were vacant. The homeowner vacancy rate was 0.0% and the rental vacancy rate was 43.3%.

=== 2000 census ===
At the 2000 census, 588 people, 242 households, and 173 families were living in the city. The population density was 504.0 people/sq mi (194.0/km^{2}). There were 283 housing units at an average density of 242.6 per square mile (93.7/km^{2}). The racial makeup of the city was 95.75% White, 0.85% Native American, 0.17% Asian, 1.53% from other races, and 1.70% from two or more races. Hispanic or Latino of any race were 3.57%.

Of the 242 households, 31.8% had children under the age of 18 living with them, 65.7% were married couples living together, 4.5% had a female householder with no husband present, and 28.1% were not families. About 27.7% of households were one person and 13.2% were one person aged 65 or older. The average household size was 2.43 and the average family size was 2.97.

The age distribution was 26.0% under the age of 18, 5.1% from 18 to 24, 24.1% from 25 to 44, 29.1% from 45 to 64, and 15.6% 65 or older. The median age was 42 years. For every 100 females, there were 95.3 males. For every 100 females age 18 and over, there were 94.2 males.

The median income for a household was $38,875 and for a family was $47,656. Males had a median income of $36,250 versus $22,222 for females. The per capita income for the city was $18,585. About 4.6% of families and 8.8% of the population were below the poverty line, including 9.7% of those under age 18 and 7.5% of those age 65 or over.

== Climate ==
Climate data for Miami, Texas (1981–2010 normals)
Month	Jan	Feb	Mar	Apr	May	Jun	Jul	Aug	Sep	Oct	Nov	Dec	Year
Record high °F (°C)	83 (28)	85 (29)	92 (33)	98 (37)	103 (39)	108 (42)	107 (42)	104 (40)	104 (40)	99 (37)	88 (31)	80 (27)	108 (42)
Mean daily maximum °F (°C)	49.0 (9.4)	52.3 (11.3)	60.6 (15.9)	69.8 (21.0)	78.1 (25.6)	86.4 (30.2)	91.4 (33.0)	90.2 (32.3)	82.4 (28.0)	71.5 (21.9)	59.5 (15.3)	48.7 (9.3)	69.9 (21.1)
Mean daily minimum °F (°C)	23.1 (−4.9)	26.0 (−3.3)	32.9 (0.5)	41.5 (5.3)	51.9 (11.1)	61.1 (16.2)	66.1 (18.9)	65.3 (18.5)	57.0 (13.9)	44.9 (7.2)	33.0 (0.6)	23.9 (−4.5)	43.9 (6.6)
Record low °F (°C)	−4 (−20)	−7 (−22)	3 (−16)	17 (−8)	30 (−1)	45 (7)	51 (11)	47 (8)	31 (−1)	12 (−11)	8 (−13)	−8 (−22)	−8 (−22)
Average precipitation inches (mm)	0.69 (18)	0.70 (18)	1.63 (41)	2.04 (52)	2.98 (76)	3.64 (92)	2.71 (69)	2.77 (70)	2.12 (54)	2.01 (51)	1.05 (27)	0.88 (22)	23.22 (590)
Average snowfall inches (cm)	4.0 (10)	3.8 (9.7)	3.6 (9.1)	0.9 (2.3)	0.2 (0.51)	0 (0)	0 (0)	0 (0)	0 (0)	0.1 (0.25)	1.3 (3.3)	5.1 (13)	19 (48)
Source: National Weather Service

== Education ==
The town is served by the Miami Independent School District. Prekindergarten through 12th grade are taught in one building. Miami High School currently provides Spanish to seven area schools via the Texas Virtual School program.

Roberts County is in the service area of Frank Phillips College (known in legislation as Borger Junior College).

== Gallery ==
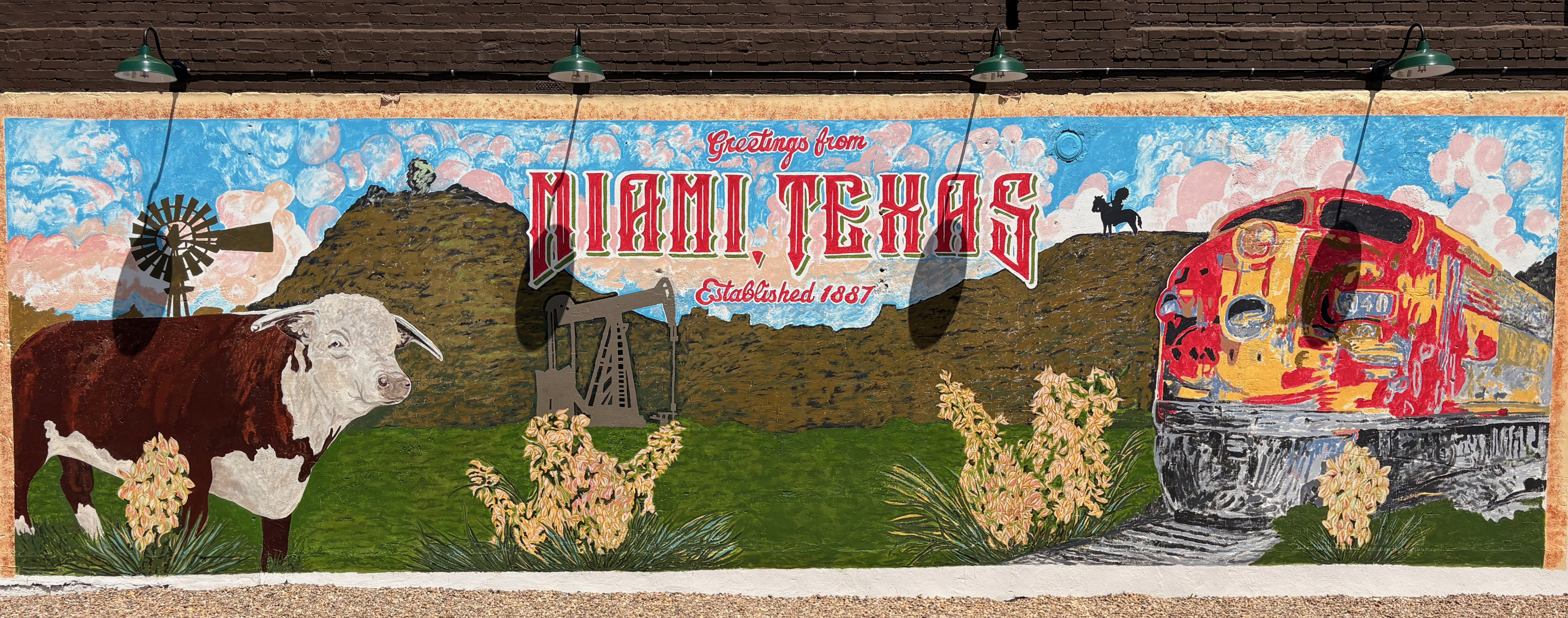
Mural in downtown Miami, TX featuring a windmill, train, and pumpjack, and Hereford cattle.
