= Hale City, Texas =

Coordinates: 34°05′34″N 101°52′20″W

Hale City is a ghost town in central Hale County, Texas, United States. It was located northwest of Hale Center, a city near Plainview, Texas, and was merged with Epworth in 1891 to form Hale Center.
