= Wayside, Armstrong County, Texas =

Unincorporated Community in Armstrong County, Texas

Coordinates: 34°47′34″N 101°32′50″W

Wayside is a small unincorporated community in Armstrong County, Texas, United States. It lies at an elevation of 3402 feet (1037 m). In 2000 the population was thirty-five. A post office was established in the community in 1879 until it was discontinued in 1985.

The community is part of the Amarillo, Texas Metropolitan Statistical Area.
