= Wayside, Roberts County, Texas =

Unincorporated community in Texas, US

Coordinates: 35°38′07″N 100°57′18″W

Wayside is a small unincorporated community in Roberts County, Texas, United States. It is part of the Pampa micropolitan statistical area and lies at an elevation of 3222 ft (982 m).
