= Smyer, Texas =

- Town
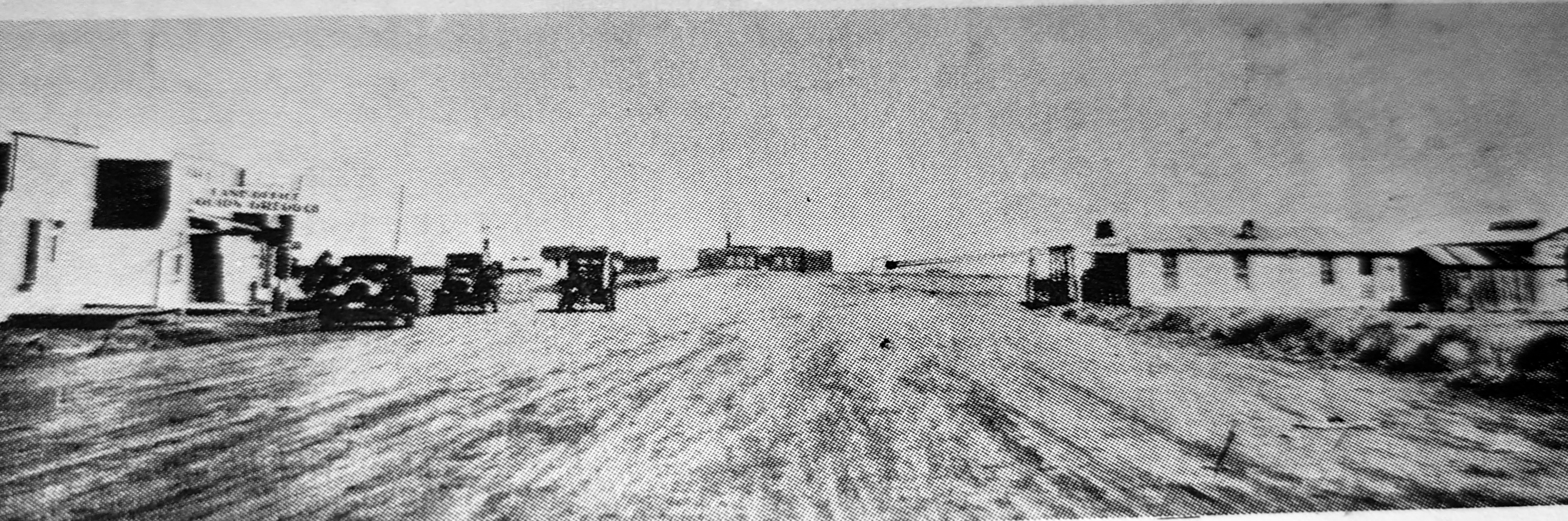
- The town of Smyer in 1925, picture taken from current Lincoln St.

- Location within Texas
- Coordinates: 33°35′03″N 102°09′48″W
- Country: United States
- State: Texas
- County: Hockley
- Region: Llano Estacado
- Established: 1924
- Incorporated: 1963
- Founder: Clinton E. Smyer (1871-1957)

Area
  - Total: 0.80 sq mi (2.06 km^{2})
  - Land: 0.80 sq mi (2.06 km^{2})
  - Water: 0 sq mi (0.00 km^{2})
- Elevation: 3,389 ft (1,033 m)

Population (2020)
  - Total: 441
  - Estimate (2022): 433
  - Density: 554/sq mi (214/km^{2})
- Time zone: UTC-6 (CST)
- ZIP code: 79367
- Area code: 806
- FIPS code: 48-68504
- GNIS feature ID: 1368526
- Website: http://www.smyertx.com/

Smyer is a town in Hockley County, Texas, United States. It is located near the Old Spade Ranch House where the current ranch headquarters is. The population was 441 at the 2020 census. in 2023, the population declined to 433.

== History ==
Smyer was settled in 1917, when William L. Ellwood began selling portions of the Spade Ranch to farmers. The town was founded in 1924 and deemed platted in 1925 after construction was completed, which soon opened up the rail service to begin in Smyer when the Santa Fe ran railroad beside the townsite. The town had many things to offer as a small town such as a school, a gin, two stores, a railway depot, and a lumberyard. The school district was created in 1924 and organized in 1927 as the old school board and new board consolidated to form the present-day school board. In 1929, the town was hit by a heavy tornado and it destroyed many things in Smyer, but the farmers managed to get back up and rebuilt from the ground up and made it better. In 1951, a new elementary school was built and in 1957, newer additions of the buildings were made to improve the student's time in school. In 1963, Smyer decided that with new plans for a school building, they would create and established a government body in the town and soon enough incorporated the same year. In 1980, the population was 455, and in 2000, the population was 480, the largest peak population ever in Smyer. In 2020, Smyer remodeled, rebuilt, and sold different areas and certain criteria around the town's functions. The town is predicted to grow in the coming years as western Lubbock continues to grow and impact other areas such as Ropesville.

== Smyer Santa Fe Depot ==
In 1925, a brick depot was constructed be the Santa Fe to serve as a midway between the towns of Levelland and Lubbock. Clinton E. Smyer, a railroad superintendent, wanted a town of his own since other people from the railway company were able to get approval for their own railroad towns. The town was given a depot to serve its area and ship the farmers’ crops and other supplies to Lubbock to be hauled onto mainlines in the other parts of Texas. The depot was an updated version from the 1895 variant to the newer style common for the time. The depot served Smyer as the South Plains & Santa Fe Railroad and made large vast trips to father areas across the South Plains. When the SP&SF eventually consolidated and ceased in the later years, the depot in Smyer was of no use until it was converted into a residence and was updated into its current status. The depot is alongside the road to the new gas station in Smyer, and has a red brick look to it with some modifications such as modern woodwork and other things. The depot is currently still in use as a residential property.

== Geography ==
Smyer is located on the high plains of the Llano Estacado at 33°35′03″N 102°09′48″W (33.5842563, –102.1632291), in eastern Hockley County. Texas State Highway 114 passes through the southern side of the town, leading west 16 miles (26 km) to Levelland, the county seat, and east 17 miles (27 km) to Lubbock.

According to the United States Census Bureau, Smyer has a total area of 0.81 square miles (2.1 km^{2}), all land.

== Demographics ==
Historical population
Census	Pop.	Note	%±
1930	102		—
1940	125		22.5%
1950	229		83.2%
1960	258		12.7%
1970	265		2.7%
1980	455		71.7%
1990	442		−2.9%
2000	480		8.6%
2010	474		−1.2%
2020	441		−7.0%
2022 (est.)	433	▼	−1.8%
U.S. Decennial Census; 2020 Census

As of the census of 2020, 481 people, 187 households, and 152 families resided in the town. The population density was 617.3 inhabitants per square mile (238.3/km^{2}). The 215 housing units averaged 276.5 per square mile (106.4/km^{2}). The racial makeup of the town was 81.88% White, 2.08% African American, 1.25% Native American, 13.12% from other races, and 1.67% from two or more races. Hispanics or Latinos of any race were 29.17% of the population.

Of the 187 households, 39.1% had children under the age of 18 living with them, 55.9% were married couples living together, 17.9% had a female householder with no husband present, and 20.7% were not families. About 19.6% of all households were made up of individuals, and 10.1% had someone living alone who was 65 years of age or older. The average household size was 2.68 and the average family size was 3.04.

In the town, the population was distributed as 32.1% under the age of 18, 6.0% from 18 to 24, 27.3% from 25 to 44, 21.9% from 45 to 64, and 12.7% who were 65 years of age or older. The median age was 37 years. For every 100 females, there were 94.3 males. For every 100 females age 18 and over, there were 84.2 males.

The median income for a household in the town was $30,667, and for a family was $32,000. Males had a median income of $23,594 versus $20,313 for females. The per capita income for the town was $11,784. About 16.4% of families and 17.3% of the population were below the poverty line, including 26.9% of those under age 18 and 3.8% of those age 65 or over.

== Education ==
The town is served by the Smyer Independent School District. The Principal of the Elementary School is Mr. Pond. The Principal of the High School is Mr. Schaap, and the Superintendent of Smyer is Mr. Chris Wade

== See also ==
- Spade Ranch (Texas)
- Llano Estacado
- Caprock Escarpment
