= South Plains =

- Region
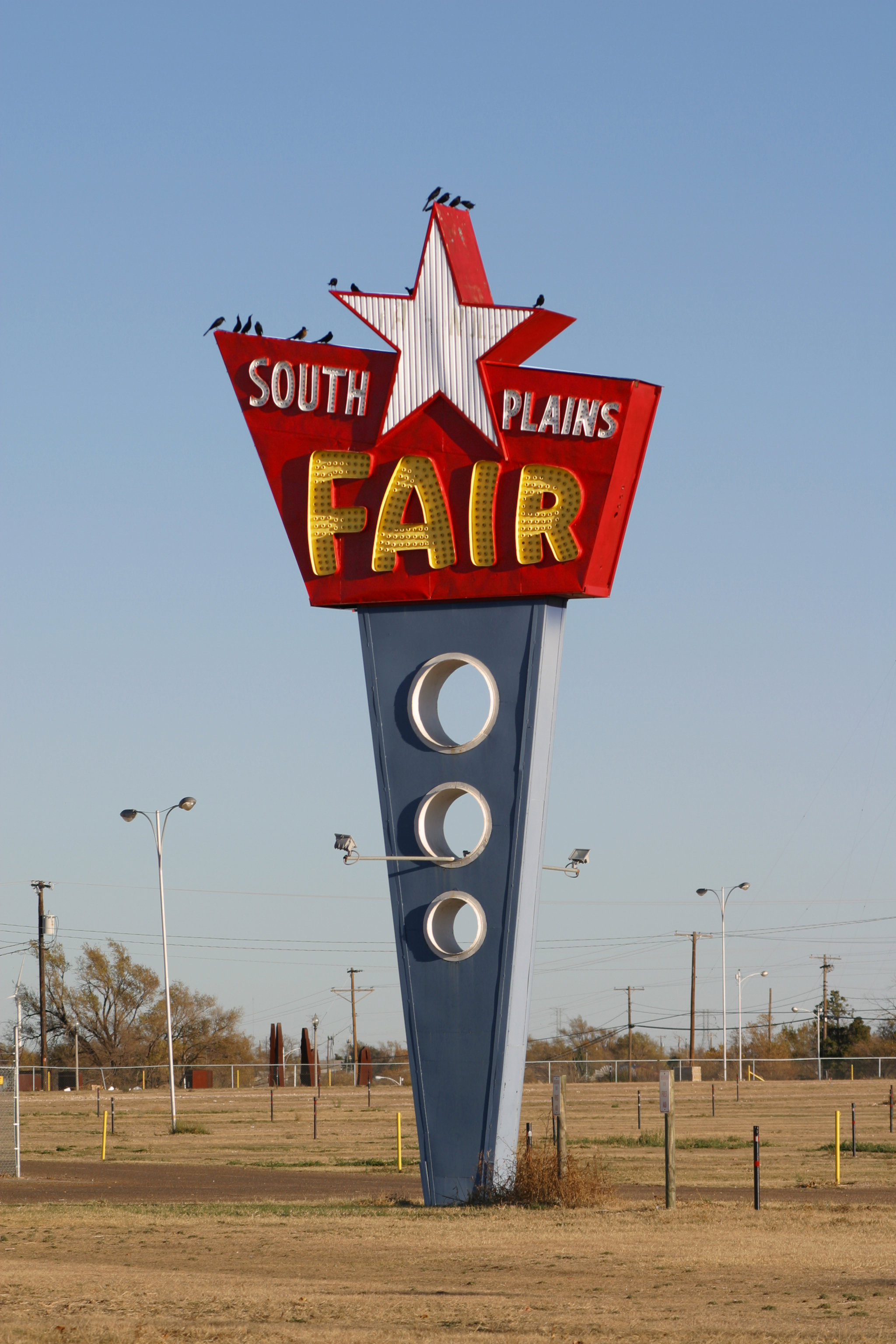

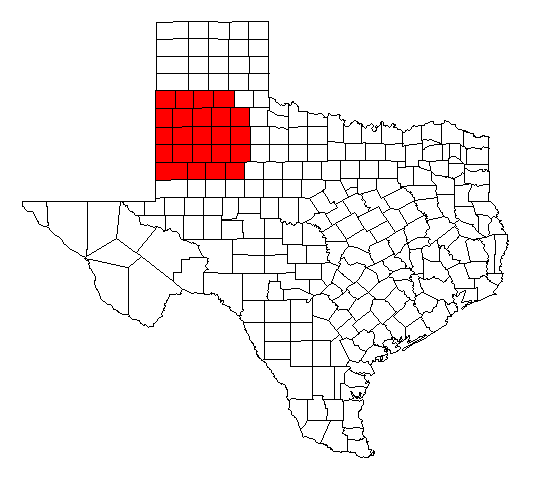
- Counties of the South Plains
- Coordinates: 33°38′N 101°48′W
- Country: United States
- State: Texas
- Region: Llano Estacado

Population
  - Total: 514,358

The South Plains are a region in northwest Texas, United States, consisting of 24 counties.

== Counties ==
The South Plains region includes:

- Bailey
- Borden
- Briscoe
- Castro
- Cochran
- Crosby
- Dawson
- Dickens
- Floyd
- Gaines
- Garza
- Hale
- Hockley
- Kent
- King (not highlighted on map)
- Lamb
- Lubbock
- Lynn
- Motley
- Parmer
- Scurry
- Swisher
- Terry
- Yoakum

The northernmost four (Parmer, Castro, Swisher, and Briscoe) also form part of the Texas Panhandle region.

The region consists of a portion of the Texas side of the geographical Llano Estacado and the western portion of the lower part of the Southwestern Tablelands ecological region. The South Plains extend south of the Texas Panhandle, and are centered at Lubbock.

While prominent in the area of petroleum production, the South Plains region is mainly agricultural, producing a great percentage of the nation's cotton and possessing numerous large cattle ranches. The South Plains is also home to several colleges and universities, the largest being Texas Tech University in Lubbock.

== Major cities and towns ==
- Abernathy
- Brownfield
- Crosbyton
- Dickens
- Dimmitt
- Farwell
- Floydada
- Gail
- Guthrie
- Jayton
- Lamesa
- Levelland
- Littlefield
- Lubbock
- Matador
- Muleshoe
- Morton
- Olton
- Plainview
- Post
- Seminole
- Snyder
- Spur
- Tahoka
- Tulia

== Cotton ==
Cotton is the most common crop grown in South Plains region. In 2004 and again in 2005, records were broken for cotton production. In an extended area comprising 31 counties in and near the South Plains, more than a million bales of cotton were harvested in 2005. This made the South Plains the world's largest cotton-producing region at the time. Depletion of the Ogallala Aquifer and cotton price variation have reduced cotton production in the region.

== Regional identity ==
Many businesses and organizations use "South Plains" as part of their name, helping to form the South Plains regional identity. These include South Plains College in Levelland; the Panhandle-South Plains Fair held at the South Plains Fairgrounds annually in Lubbock; Make-A-Wish Texas South Plains; the South Plains Regional Chapter of the American Red Cross; South Plains Council of the Boy Scouts of America; and numerous other public and private organizations.

== See also ==
- List of geographical regions in Texas
- Western High Plains ecology region
- Great Plains
- Eastern New Mexico
- Caprock Escarpment
