= Smyer Independent School District =

School district in Texas

Location
- Smyer, Hockley County, Texas, 79367; United States
- Coordinates: 33.5900°N 102.1642°W

District information
- Motto: Pursue Greatness!
- Grades: PK-12th
- Established: 1924 (100 years old)
- Superintendent: Chris Wade
- Schools: Smyer Independent School
- Budget: $5.12M
- NCES District ID: 4840590

Students and staff
- Students: 430
- Teachers: 44
- District mascot: Claws
- Colors: 🟦⬜

Other information
- Website: www.smyer-isd.org

Smyer Independent School District is a public school district based in Smyer, Texas, United States that serves students in east central Hockley County.

There are two schools in the district: Smyer Secondary (Grades 7–12) and Smyer Elementary (Grades PK-6).

Mrs. Gibson serves as principal for the elementary and Mr. Pond serves as the principal for the high school.

In 2022, The school was named "National Blue Ribbon School" by the Texas Education Agency for its hard work and dedication in school activities.

== History ==
The first school building and district of “early day Smyer” was created in 1904, but after a lack of pupils, the district was forced to foreclose. Smyer, after its construction began, moved the old school and remodeled it for all ages in 1923. Smyer had the school teach from various ages, with Mr. Turney and Mrs. Turney serving as teachers at the school from 1925 to 1935.

In 1937, Clinton Smyer planned on a new complex for kids and teens to fit in, as the town was growing slowly and more room was needed, but after an unfortunate incident with money bonds, the plans was denied and never took effect.

In 1951, Smyer built a new elementary school that had various modern features that would allow the children to feel comfortable and secure. The high school and elementary school were separated for a decent time but would later on be connected in another construction plan. The current additions and changes were made around the early 70s and mid 90s and were completed with the school continuing teaching even with the construction in the background.

In 1972, Smyer Independent School District sold $5,300 unlimited tax school bonds to LeveIIand State Bank, and Underwood, Neuhaus Co. Inc., Houston.

As Smyer ISD has continued through the years, the school district will go through a couple of rough moments before having a change to leap forward and make a major difference. The school has continued its attempts at being forward-thinking and modernistic just like the past generations before them.

By the 1976 school opening, the district superintendent expected enrollment to be 245.

In the 2017–2018 school year, the district reported student enrollment, Pre K through grade 12, was 441, with 40.3 (Full Time Equivalent) classroom teachers.

== Athletics ==
The mascot for the school is the Bobcats for the boys' teams, and the Ladycats for the girls' teams. The Ladycats won back-to-back girls state basketball championships in 2010 and 2011, and state runner-ups in 2013. The Bobcats were state basketball semi-finalists in 2014. There is only one jersey that is retired and hung up in the gym, and that is #23 for Haley Fowler who graduated in the class of 2012, and was a key member of the state championship teams in 2010 and 2011. The Athletic Director is currently Scott Funke who is also the Head Football Coach. The current head basketball coach for the Bobcats is Jonathan Gomez. The current head basketball coach for the girls is Todd Nichols. The current head baseball coach is Jerry Lawrence. Head track coaches are Corey Hatter and Payton Shipley for the Bobcats and Ladycats, respectively. Other coaches who assist are Mike Schaap, and Jonathan Hood.
