= Levelland UFO case =

UFO incident in Texas, United States in 1957

Location of Levelland, Texas

The Levelland UFO case refers to UFOs reportedly seen around highways near Levelland, Texas on 2–3 November 1957. Both the US Air Force and UFO skeptics concluded that the reports were caused by either ball lightning or a severe electrical storm. Ufologists believe it represents the most impressive case in UFO history, mainly because of the large number of witnesses involved over a relatively short period of time.

== Reports ==
Levelland, which in 1957 had a population of about 10,000, is located west of Lubbock on the flat prairie of the Texas South Plains. On the evening of 2 November 1957, two immigrant farm workers, Pedro Saucedo and Joe Salaz, called the Levelland police department to report a UFO sighting. Saucedo told police officer A. J. Fowler, who was working the night desk at the police station, that they had been driving four miles (6.4 km) west of Levelland when they saw a blue flash of light near the road. They claimed their truck's engine died, and a rocket-shaped object rose up and approached the truck. According to Saucedo, "I jumped out of the truck and hit the dirt because I was afraid. I called out to Joe but he didn't get out. The thing passed directly over my big truck with a great sound and rush of wind. It sounded like thunder and my truck rocked from the flash...I felt a lot of heat." As the object moved away the truck's engine restarted and worked normally. Believing the story to be a joke, Fowler ignored it. An hour later, motorist Jim Wheeler reported a "brilliantly lit, egg-shaped object" that he estimated at a length of approximately 200 feet (61 meters) sitting in the road four miles (6.4 km) east of Levelland, blocking his path. He claimed his vehicle died, and as he got out of his car, the object took off and its lights went out. As it moved away, Wheeler's car restarted and worked normally.

At 10:55 p.m., a married couple driving northeast of Levelland reported that they saw a bright flash of light moving across the sky and their headlights and radio died for three seconds. Five minutes later, Jose Alvarez claimed he met a strange object sitting on the road 11 miles (18 km) north of Levelland, and his vehicle's engine died until the object departed. At 12:05 a.m. (3 November), a Texas Technological College (now Texas Tech University) student named Newell Wright was surprised when, driving 10 miles (16 km) east of Levelland, his "car engine began to sputter, the ammeter on the dash jumped to discharge and then back to normal, and the motor started cutting out like it was out of gas...the car rolled to a stop; then the headlights dimmed and several seconds later went out." When he got out to check on the problem, he saw a "100-foot-long" [30-meter-long] egg-shaped object sitting in the road. It took off, and his engine started running again. At 12:15 a.m., Officer Fowler received another call, this time from a farmer named Frank Williams who claimed he had encountered a brightly glowing object sitting in the road, and "as his car approached it, its lights went out and its motor stopped." The object flew away, and his car's lights and the motor started working again. Other callers were Ronald Martin at 12:45 a.m. and James Long at 1:15 a.m., and they both reported seeing a brightly lit object sitting in the road in front of them. They also claimed that their engines and headlights had died until the object flew away.

By this time, several Levelland police officers were investigating the reports. Among them was Sheriff Weir Clem who, at 1:30 a.m., saw a brilliant red object moving across the sky. Fifteen minutes later, Levelland's Fire Chief, Ray Jones, also saw an object. His vehicle's headlights and engine likewise experienced temporary issues. The reports apparently ended soon after. During the night of 2–3 November, the Levelland police department received a total of 15 UFO-related reports, and Officer Fowler noted that "everybody who called was very excited."

=== White Sands sightings ===
Press and others, including Air Force UFO investigator Edward J. Ruppelt, connected the Levelland case with similar reports in nearby New Mexico. Hours after the sightings in Levelland, at 2:30 a.m., two different military police patrols at the White Sands Proving Ground reported a bright, unidentified egg-shaped object they estimated to be 100 yards (91 m) in diameter. The object was described as being "nearly as bright as the sun" and was reportedly hovering "over the bunker used in the first A-bomb explosion at Trinity Site".

On November 4, military technician James Stokes reported a similar sighting while driving from his home in Alamogordo to El Paso. According to Stokes, his car radio malfunctioned, followed by his automobile's engine losing power. He reported being one of "six to ten" such cars stranded along Highway 54 about eight to ten miles (13 to 16 km) south of Orogrande. Stokes described an egg-shaped craft about 500 feet (150 m) in length travelling Mach 2. He further reported a tan or sunburn from the object and observed "it felt like the radiation of a giant sun lamp". Time Magazine covered the cases in its November 17 edition.

=== Reinhold O. Schmidt controversy ===
The 1957 UFO flap concluded with a case widely deemed a hoax by ufologists. Reinhold O. Schmidt claimed that while driving through a rural area near Kearney, Nebraska, on November 5, 1957, he saw a large, blimp-shaped object on the ground in a field. He claimed two men left the object and escorted him inside, wherein he witnessed four men and two women speaking a language he described as "High German". The group claimed to be from the planet Venus, and a thirty minute discussion ensued. Upon departing the craft, the ship ascended into the air, revealing large propellers at each end. Following this alleged experience, Schmidt contacted the local sheriff and brought two local police officers to view the supposed landing site, where a greasy, greenish substance was observed. That same evening, Schmidt began publicizing his story via telephone, radio interviews, and a television appearance. The police were skeptical and held him overnight in jail while they continued their investigation. After uncovering a prior embezzlement conviction and finding a can of green motor oil near the alleged contact site, Schmidt was transferred to the Hastings State Hospital for a psychiatric evaluation. Schmidt was later convicted of grand theft stemming from charges alleging that he used the story about extraterrestrials to defraud a woman out of $5,000.

== U.S. Air Force investigation ==
The Levelland sightings received national publicity and were soon investigated by Project Blue Book. Started in 1947 as Project Sign, Project Blue Book was the official US Air Force research group assigned to investigate UFO reports. An Air Force sergeant was sent to Levelland and spent seven hours in the city investigating the incident. After interviewing three of the eyewitnesses – Saucedo, Wheeler, and Wright – and after learning that thunderstorms were present in the area earlier in the day, the Air Force investigator concluded that a severe electrical storm – most probably ball lightning or St. Elmo's fire – was the major cause for the sightings and reported auto failures. According to UFO historian Curtis Peebles, "the Air Force found only three persons who had witnessed the 'blue light'...there was no uniform description of the object." Additionally, Project Blue Book believed that "Saucedo's account could not be relied upon – he had only a grade school education and had no concept of direction and was conflicting in his answers...in view of the stormy weather conditions, an electrical phenomenon such as ball lightning or St. Elmo's fire seemed to be the most probable cause." The engine failures mentioned by the eyewitnesses were blamed on "wet electrical circuits." Donald H. Menzel, an astronomer at Harvard University and a prominent UFO skeptic, agreed with the Air Force explanation: "members of civilian saucer groups complained that, since [the Air Force investigator] had spent only seven hours in the area, he had obviously not taken the problem seriously and could not have found the correct solution. Even seventy hours of labour, however, could not have produced a clearer picture...the evidence leads to an overwhelming probability: the fiery unknown at Levelland was ball lightning." Menzel argued that "in Levelland on the night of November 2 conditions were ideal for the formation of ball lightning. For several days the area had been experiencing freak weather, and on the night in question had been visited by rain, thunderstorms and lightning." Menzel admitted that "since ball lightning is short-lived and cannot be preserved as tangible evidence, its appearance on the night of November 2 can never be absolutely proved." However, he also argued that "only the saucer proponents could have converted so trivial a series of events – a few stalled automobiles, balls of flame in the sky at the end of the thunderstorm – into a national mystery."

== Ufologists ==
Two ufologists – James E. McDonald and J. Allen Hynek – disputed the Air Force ball lightning/electrical storm explanation. Both men argued that there was no electrical storm in the area when the sightings occurred. In testimony before a committee of the US House of Representatives in 1968, McDonald said that "One famous [UFO] case was at Levelland, Texas...ten vehicles were stopped within a short area, all independently in a 2-hour period. There was no lightning or thunderstorm, and only a trace of rain." Hynek wrote that "as the person responsible for the tracking of the new Soviet satellite Sputnik, I was on a virtual around-the-clock duty and was unable to give it any attention whatever. I am not proud today that I hastily concurred in [the Air Force's] evaluation as 'ball lightning' on the basis of information that an electrical storm had been in progress in the Levelland area at the time. This was shown not to be the case. Observers reported overcast and mist but no lightning." Hynek also noted that "had I given it any thought whatsoever, I would soon have recognized the absence of any evidence that ball lightning can stop cars and put out headlights." Ufologists have also argued that the Air Force investigator did not interview nine of the fifteen witnesses, nor were they mentioned in Blue Book's final report on the incident.

== Media coverage ==
In March 2002, Dallas-based television station KDFW aired a report about the Levelland UFO case in which reporter Richard Ray (now retired) interviewed Sheriff Weir Clem's widow and friends.

== See also ==
- Lubbock Lights – Unusual light formation over Lubbock, Texas, between August and September 1951
- List of UFO sightings
