= Balch, Texas =

Ghost town in Texas, US

- Ghost town
- Location in Texas
- Coordinates: 33.45380100°N 102.10046200°W
- Country: United States
- State: Texas
- County: Hockley

Balch is a ghost town in Hockley County, Texas, United States. It is situated on U.S. Route 62 and 82. It is also situated on the Atchison, Topeka and Santa Fe Railway, and was named for its director from 1868 to 1871, A. P. Balch. Primarily agricultural, it was abandoned before the 1980s.
