= Opdyke West, Texas =

- Town
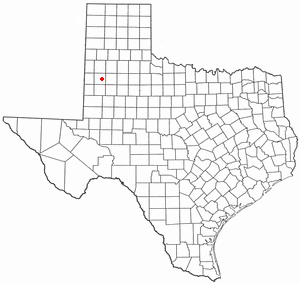
- Location of Opdyke West, Texas

- Coordinates: 33°35′36″N 102°17′56″W
- Country: United States
- State: Texas
- County: Hockley

Area
  - Total: 0.22 sq mi (0.58 km^{2})
  - Land: 0.22 sq mi (0.58 km^{2})
  - Water: 0 sq mi (0.00 km^{2})
- Elevation: 3,471 ft (1,058 m)

Population (2020)
  - Total: 220
  - Density: 980/sq mi (380/km^{2})
- Time zone: UTC-6 (Central (CST))
  - Summer (DST): UTC-5 (CDT)
- FIPS code: 48-54075
- GNIS feature ID: 1388575

Opdyke West is a town in Hockley County, Texas, United States. Its population was 220 at the 2020 census. It takes its name from the nearby community of Opdyke, founded in 1925, which was named either for Charles W. Opdyke, railroad director, or for the family of W. A. Dykes, who established the first gin in the area by 1937. Opdyke West was incorporated in 1984.

== Geography ==
Opdyke West is located in central Hockley County at 33°35′36″N 102°17′56″W (33.593241, –102.298924). Texas State Highway 114 passes through the north side of the town, leading west 4 miles (6 km) to Levelland, the county seat, and east 26 miles (42 km) to Lubbock.

According to the United States Census Bureau, the town has a total area of 2.3 square miles (6 km^{2}), all land.

== Demographics ==
Historical population
Census	Pop.	Note	%±
1990	100		—
2000	188		88.0%
2010	174		−7.4%
2020	220		26.4%
U.S. Decennial Census; 2020 Census

As of the census of 2000, 188 people, 74 households, and 46 families resided in the town. The population density was 791.9 inhabitants per square mile (305.8/km^{2}). The 80 housing units had an average density of 337.0 per square mile (130.1/km^{2}). The racial makeup of the town was 75.53% White, 3.72% Native American, 14.89% from other races, and 5.85% from two or more races. Hispanics or Latinos of any race were 32.98% of the population.

Of thee 74 households, 44.6% had children under 18 living with them, 48.6% were married couples living together, 13.5% had a female householder with no husband present, and 36.5% were not families. About 23.0% of all households were made up of individuals, and 2.7% had someone living alone who was 65 or older. The average household size was 2.54, and the average family size was 3.11.

In the town, the age distribution was 27.7% under 18, 26.1% from 18 to 24, 30.3% from 25 to 44, 13.8% from 45 to 64, and 2.1% who were 65 or older. The median age was 24 years. For every 100 females, there were 106.6 males. For every 100 females 18 and over, there were 115.9 males.

The median income in the town for a household was $31,667 and for a family was $30,750. Males had a median income of $23,750 versus $17,083 for females. The per capita income for the town was $15,261. About 13.2% of families and 13.6% of the population were below the poverty line, including 22.4% of those under 18 and none of those 65 or over.

== Education ==
The Town of Opdyke West is served by the Levelland Independent School District.
