= Ropesville, Texas =

- City
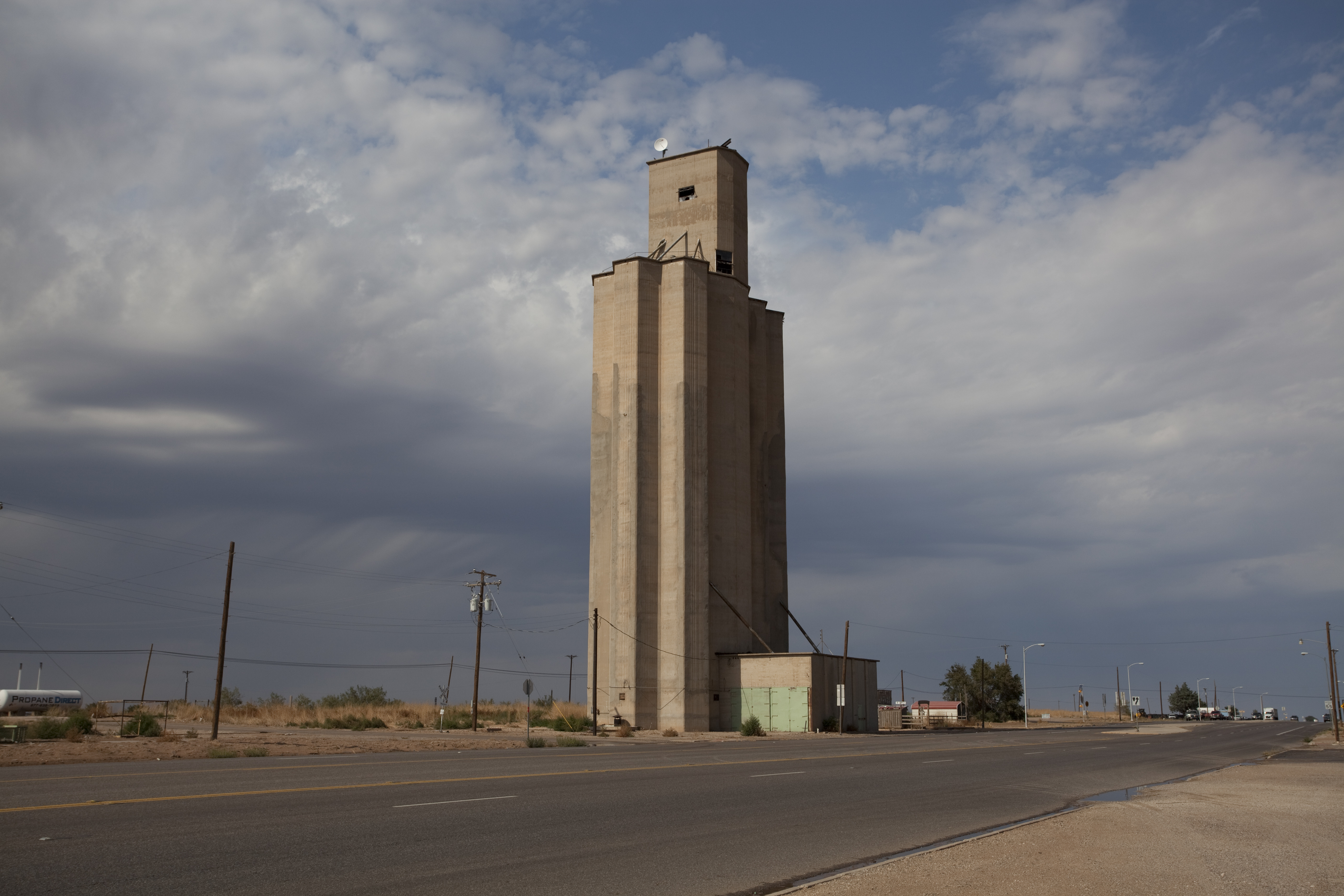
- Grain elevator in Ropesville

- Location within Texas
- Coordinates: 33°24′48″N 102°09′16″W
- Country: United States
- State: Texas
- County: Hockley
- Region: Llano Estacado
- Established: 1917

Area
  - Total: 0.36 sq mi (0.94 km^{2})
  - Land: 0.36 sq mi (0.94 km^{2})
  - Water: 0 sq mi (0.00 km^{2})
- Elevation: 3,363 ft (1,025 m)

Population (2020)
  - Total: 430
  - Density: 1,200/sq mi (460/km^{2})
- Time zone: UTC-6 (CST)
- ZIP code: 79358
- Area code: 806
- FIPS code: 48-63140
- GNIS feature ID: 1366856
- Website: cityofropesville.com

Ropesville is a city in Hockley County, Texas, United States. Its population was 430 at the 2020 census, down from 434 at the 2010 census.

== Geography ==
Ropesville is located on the high plains of the Llano Estacado at 33°24′48″N 102°09′16″W (33.4134229, –102.1543406), in the southeastern corner of Hockley County. U.S. Routes 62 and 82 pass together through the northwestern side of the city, leading northeast 21 miles (34 km) to Lubbock and southwest 18 miles (29 km) to Brownfield. Levelland, the Hockley county seat, is 24 miles (39 km) to the northwest via farm roads.

According to the United States Census Bureau, Ropesville has a total area of 0.3 square miles (0.9 km^{2}), all land.

== Demographics ==
Historical population
| Census | Pop. | Note | %± |
|---|---|---|---|
| 1950 | 391 | | — |
| 1960 | 423 | | 8.2% |
| 1970 | 483 | | 14.2% |
| 1980 | 489 | | 1.2% |
| 1990 | 494 | | 1.0% |
| 2000 | 517 | | 4.7% |
| 2010 | 434 | | −16.1% |
| 2020 | 430 | | −0.9% |
U.S. Decennial Census; 2020 Census

=== 2020 census ===
As of the 2020 census, Ropesville had a population of 430. The median age was 41.0 years; 23.0% of the residents were under 18 and 16.5% were 65 or older. The female/male ratio was 1:1.067 overall and 1:1.043for those 18 and over.

None of theresidents lived in urban areas, while 100.0% lived in rural areas.

Of the 150 households in Ropesville, 40.0% had children under 18 living in them, 52.7% were married-couple households, 20.0% were households with a male householder and no spouse or partner present, and 21.3% were households with a female householder and no spouse or partner present. About 18.7% of all households were made up of individuals, and 12.0% had someone living alone who was 65 or older.

The city had 170 housing units, of which 11.8% were vacant. The homeowner vacancy rate was 1.7% and the rental vacancy rate was 7.5%.

Racial composition as of the 2020 census
| Race | Number | Percentage |
|---|---|---|
| White | 252 | 58.6% |
| Black or African American | 11 | 2.6% |
| American Indian and Alaska Native | 6 | 1.4% |
| Asian | 1 | 0.2% |
| Native Hawaiian and other Pacific Islander | 0 | 0.0% |
| Some other race | 87 | 20.2% |
| Two or more races | 73 | 17.0% |
| Hispanic or Latino (of any race) | 251 | 58.4% |

=== 2000 census ===
As of the 2000 census, 517 people, 177 households, and 141 families resided in the city. The population density was 1,441.5 inhabitants per square mile (556.6/km^{2}). The 185 housing units averaged 515.8 per square mile (199.2/km^{2}). The racial makeup of the city was 87.43% White, 2.13% African American, 0.97% Native American, 6.00% from other races, and 3.48% from two or more races. Hispanics or Latinos of any race were 53.19% of the population.

Of the 177 households, 43.5% had children under 18 living with them, 64.4% were married couples living together, 7.9% had a female householder with no husband present, and 19.8% were not families. About 18.6% of all households were made up of individuals, and 9.6% had someone living alone who was 65 or older. The average household size was 2.92, and the average family size was 3.32.

In the city, the population was distributed as 33.3% under 18, 8.1% from 18 to 24, 26.1% from 25 to 44, 20.9% from 45 to 64, and 11.6% who were 65 age or older. The median age was 33 years. For every 100 females, there were 101.2 males. For every 100 females age 18 and over, there were 96.0 males.

The median income in the city for a household was $29,531 and for a family was $31,250. Males had a median income of $21,176 versus $18,393 for females. The per capita income for the city was $16,670. About 14.7% of families and 14.6% of the population were below the poverty line, including 19.2% of those under 18 and 16.4% of those 65 or over.

== Education ==
Ropesville is served by the Ropes Independent School District.

== Government ==
The city government is presided over by Mayor Brenda Rabel.

== History ==
=== Ropesville federal project ===
In 1935 during the Dust Bowl, the Resettlement Administration bought land and planned an experimental industrial farm. Rexford Tugwell, the administrator, wanted to determine the feasibility of rural farming on the plains, calling the project Ropesville. The Resettlement Administration carved the 4000 acres it had purchased into 33 farms, each around 130 acres, with a windmill, water well, barn, and corral. Eventually, the project expanded to 79 units. The Farm Security Administration (FSA) took over the project in 1937.

Lubbock boosters took a dim view of the project because it abandoned the frontier model of settlement and appeared to reward poor and lazy farming. The Ropesville project began to wind down in 1941, with all of the farms being sold off within two years. By all accounts, the experimental project was a success after five years. Later, however, a FSA study determined a family could not live on a subsistence homestead on the South Plains.
