= Whitharral, Texas =

- Unincorporated community
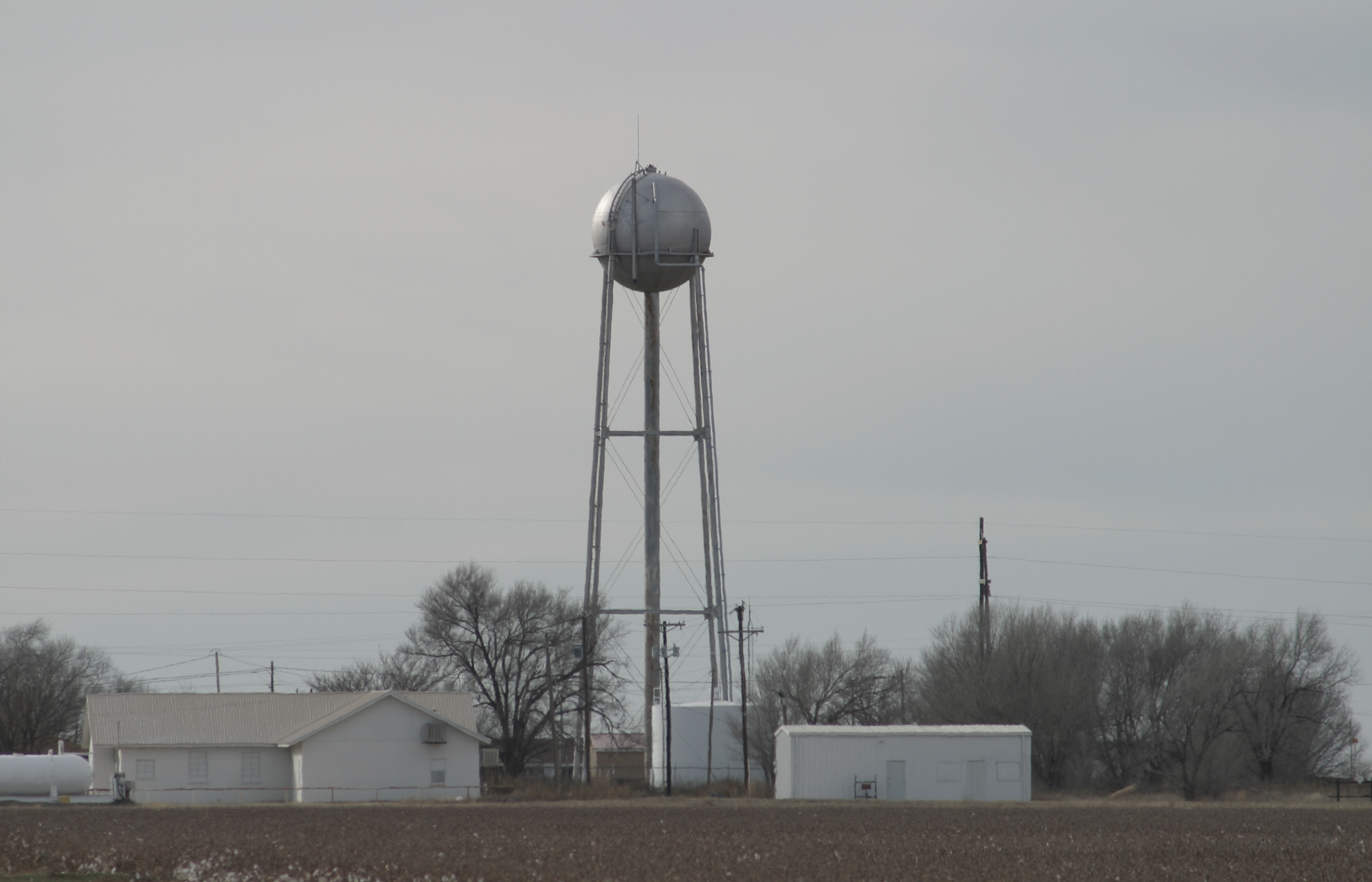
- Water tower in Whitharral

- Location within Texas Location within the United States
- Coordinates: 33°44′15″N 102°19′38″W
- Country: United States
- State: Texas
- County: Hockley
- Physiographic region: Llano Estacado
- Founded: 1924
- Founder: John W. Harral (1871-1938)
- Elevation: 3,481 ft (1,061 m)

Population (2020)
  - Total: 119
- Time zone: UTC-6 (Central (CST))
  - Summer (DST): UTC-5 (CDT)
- ZIP code: 79380
- Area code: 806
- Website: Handbook of Texas

Whitharral (pronounced "WHIT-hair-ul", the T and H do not blend) is an unincorporated community in Hockley County, Texas, United States.

As of the 2020 census, Whitharral had a population of 119.

== History ==
Whitharral was founded in 1924 after the sale of the Littlefield ranchlands. The town was named for John Whitfield Harral, a trustee of the Yellow House Land Company, which sold the Littlefield ranchlands to farmers.

A school was founded in 1925, and a post office the following year. Cotton gins, three churches, a garage, and a general store followed soon after.

Tornadoes have hit the town twice. The first occurred on Easter Sunday of 1957, causing some residential damage. Late in the evening on April 17, 1970, a violent tornado caused heavy damage to parts of the city and flattened the school's gym just minutes after fans and players had left the facility.

== Demographics ==
Historical population
Census	Pop.	Note	%±
2020	119		—
U.S. Decennial Census; 1850–1900 1910; 1920 1930 1940; 1950 1960 1970; 1980 1990 2000; 2010 2020

Whitharral first appeared as a census designated place in the 2020 U.S. census.

=== 2020 Census ===
Whitharral CDP, Texas – Racial and ethnic composition Note: the US Census treats Hispanic/Latino as an ethnic category. This table excludes Latinos from the racial categories and assigns them to a separate category. Hispanics/Latinos may be of any race.
Race / Ethnicity (NH = Non-Hispanic)	Pop 2020	% 2020
White alone (NH)	55	46.22%
Other race alone (NH)	1	0.84%
Multiracial (NH)	4	3.36%
Hispanic or Latino (any race)	59	49.58%
Total	119	100.00%

== Education ==
The Whitharral Independent School District serves area students. The high school football team has played in the UIL six-man football state championship three times, winning in 1981 and 2001.

On March 2, 2013, the Whitharral girls basketball team, the Lady Panthers, captured the Class 1A Division II state championship by defeating Saltillo of Hopkins County, Texas.

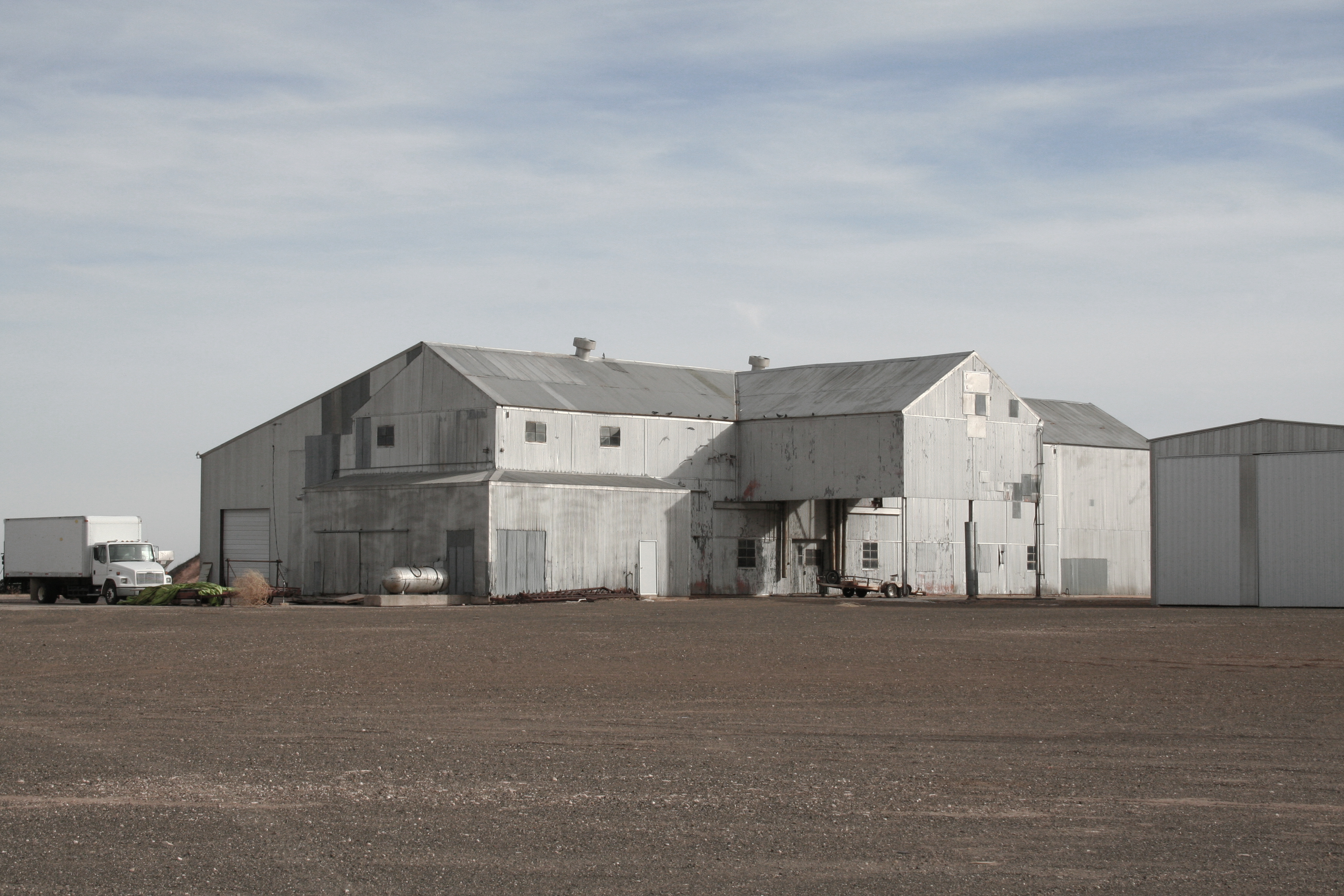
Cotton gin, Whitharral

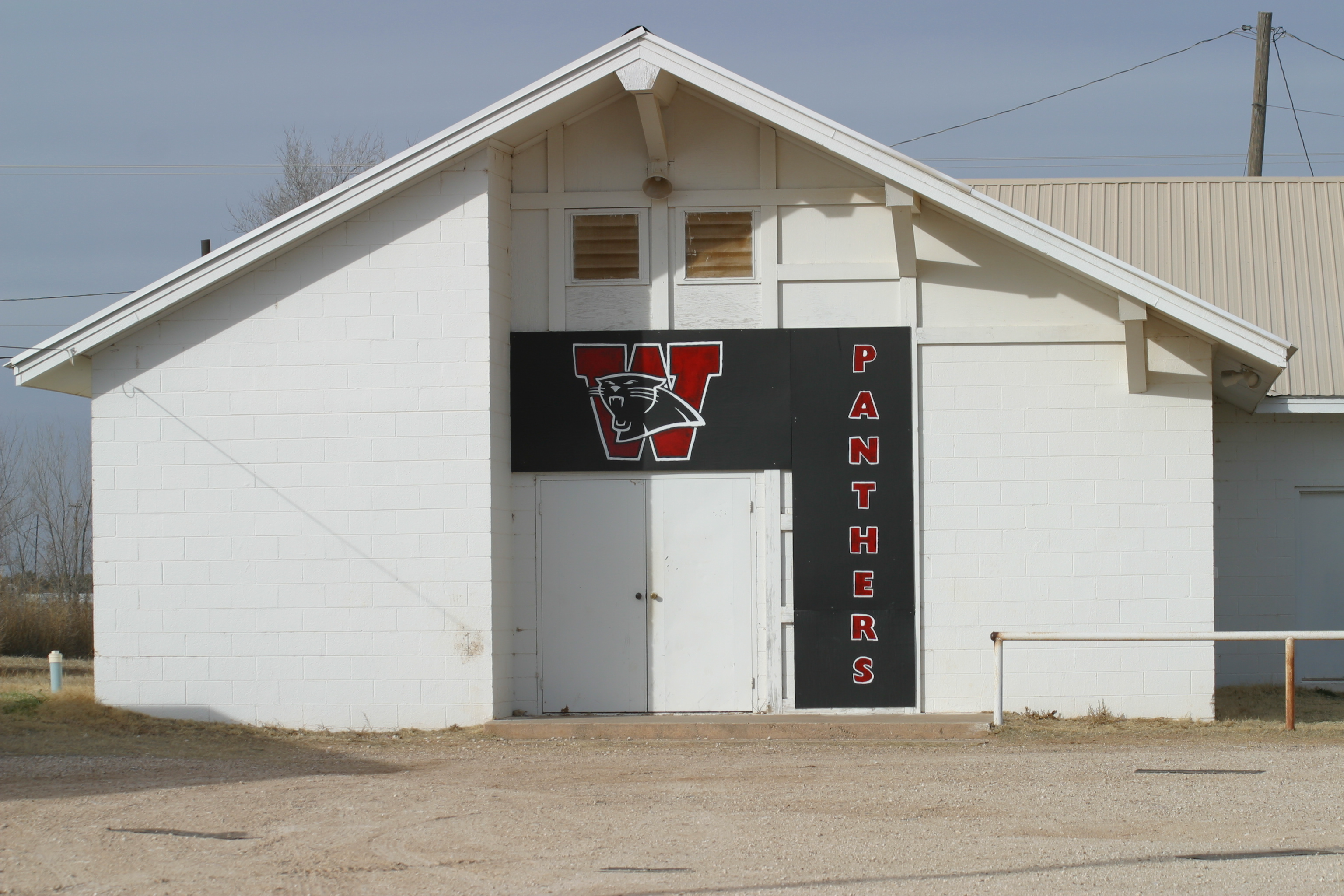
Whitharral Panthers six-man football facility

== See also ==
- Llano Estacado
- West Texas
- U.S. Route 385
- Pep, Texas
