= Tokio, Texas =

Unincorporated community in Texas, US

Coordinates: 33°10′53″N 102°16′31″W

Tokio is an unincorporated community in Terry County, Texas, United States. According to the Handbook of Texas, the community had an estimated population of 24 in 2000. The town was named after the capital city of Japan with the same name. The town of Tokio was founded in 1908, and relocated a mile south to the current location in 1928 when U.S. Highway 380 was redirected. Although it reached a population of at least 125 residents in the 1940s, Tokio is now largely abandoned. A historical marker stands in front of the old Tokio School.

Another Texas community named Tokio (also called Wiggins) is located in McLennan County, near West, Texas.
