= Levelland High School =

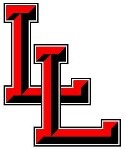

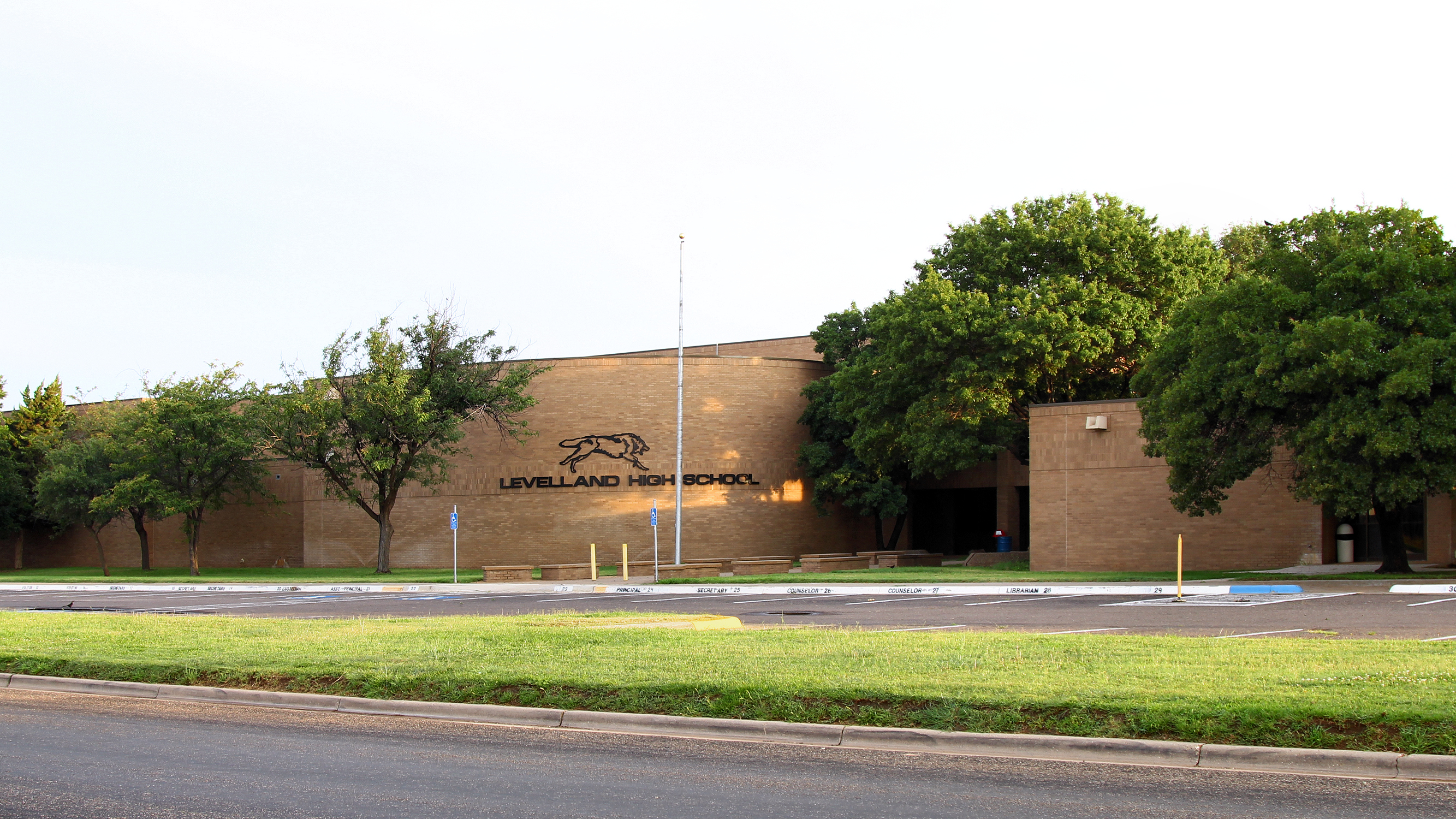

Location
- 1400 Hickory Street; Levelland, Texas 79336-5129; United States; 33.583820°N 102.349885°W

Information
- School type: Public high school
- School district: Levelland Independent School District
- Principal: Mathew Birdwell
- Staff: 59.04 (on an FTE basis)
- Grades: 9–12
- Enrollment: 759 (2023-2024)
- Student to teacher ratio: 12.86
- Colors: Red and black
- Athletics conference: UIL Class AAAA
- Mascot: Lobos/Loboettes
- Website: Levelland High School website

Levelland High School is a public high school located in Levelland, Texas, United States. It is part of the Levelland Independent School District located in central Hockley County and classified as a 4A school by the University Interscholastic League. In 2015, the school was rated "Met Standard" by the Texas Education Agency. The school has continued to achieve A rate for the past several years. As recently as of 2022-2023.

== Athletics ==
The Levelland Lobos compete in the following sports:

- American football
- Baseball
- Basketball
- Cross country
- Golf
- Powerlifting
- Softball
- Tennis
- Track and field
- Volleyball

=== State titles ===
- Girls' basketball -
  - 1983(4A), 1986(4A), 1987(4A), 1988(4A), 1989(4A), 1991(4A), 1997(4A)

==== State finalists ====
- Girls' basketball -
  - 1982(4A), 1984(4A), 1993(4A)

== Notable alumni ==
- Beau Boulter (class of 1960), member of the United States House of Representatives for Texas's 13th congressional district from 1985 to 1989
- Ronny Jackson (class of 1985), Physician to the President under the Obama and Trump administrations.
