= Meadow High School (Texas) =

Location
- 604 4th Street; Meadow, Texas 79345-9801; United States; 33.339819°N 102.211521°W

Information
- School type: Public high school
- School district: Meadow Independent School District
- Principal: Bric Turner
- Staff: 25.41 (FTE)
- Grades: PK-12
- Enrollment: 237 (2023–2024)
- Student to teacher ratio: 9.33
- Colors: Purple & Gold
- Athletics conference: UIL Class A
- Mascot: Broncos
- Website: Homepage

Meadow High School or Meadow School is a 1A public high school located in Meadow, Texas (USA). It is part of the Meadow Independent School District located in northeast Terry County. In 2013, the school was rated "Met Standard" by the Texas Education Agency.

== Athletics ==
The Meadow Broncos compete in the following sports:

- Basketball
- Cross Country
- 6-Man Football
- Track and Field

=== State Titles ===
- Girls Track
  - 1966(1A)
- One Act Play
  - 1968(B), 1969(B), 1970(B), 1971(B), 1972(B), 1974(B), 1977(B)

==== State Finalists ====
- Boys Basketball
  - 1957(B)
