= Levelland Independent School District =

School district in Texas

Levelland Independent School District is a public school district based in Levelland, Texas, United States. In addition to Levelland, the district also serves the town of Opdyke West.

Texas author Lou Halsell Rodenberger (1926–2009) taught English and journalism at Levelland High School in the late 1940s.

Popular football coach Gene Mayfield concluded his career at Levelland.

In 2009, the school district was rated "academically acceptable" by the Texas Education Agency.

== Schools ==
- Levelland High School
- Levelland Middle School
- Capitol Elementary
- South Elementary
- ABC Early Childhood Center
