= Ropes Independent School District =

School district in Texas

Coordinates: 33.4130°N 102.1545°W

Ropes Independent School District is a public school district based in Ropesville, Texas, United States. Located in Hockley County, a small portion of the district extends into Terry County. Ropes ISD has one school that serves students in prekindergarten through grade 12.

In 2009, the school district was rated "academically acceptable" by the Texas Education Agency.
