= South Plains College =

Community college in Levelland, Texas, US

- Type: Public community college
- President: Robin Satterwhite
- Students: 9900
- Location: Levelland, Texas, United States; 33.576243°N 102.367642°W
- Colors: Blue and Orange
- Mascot: Texans
- Website: www.southplainscollege.edu

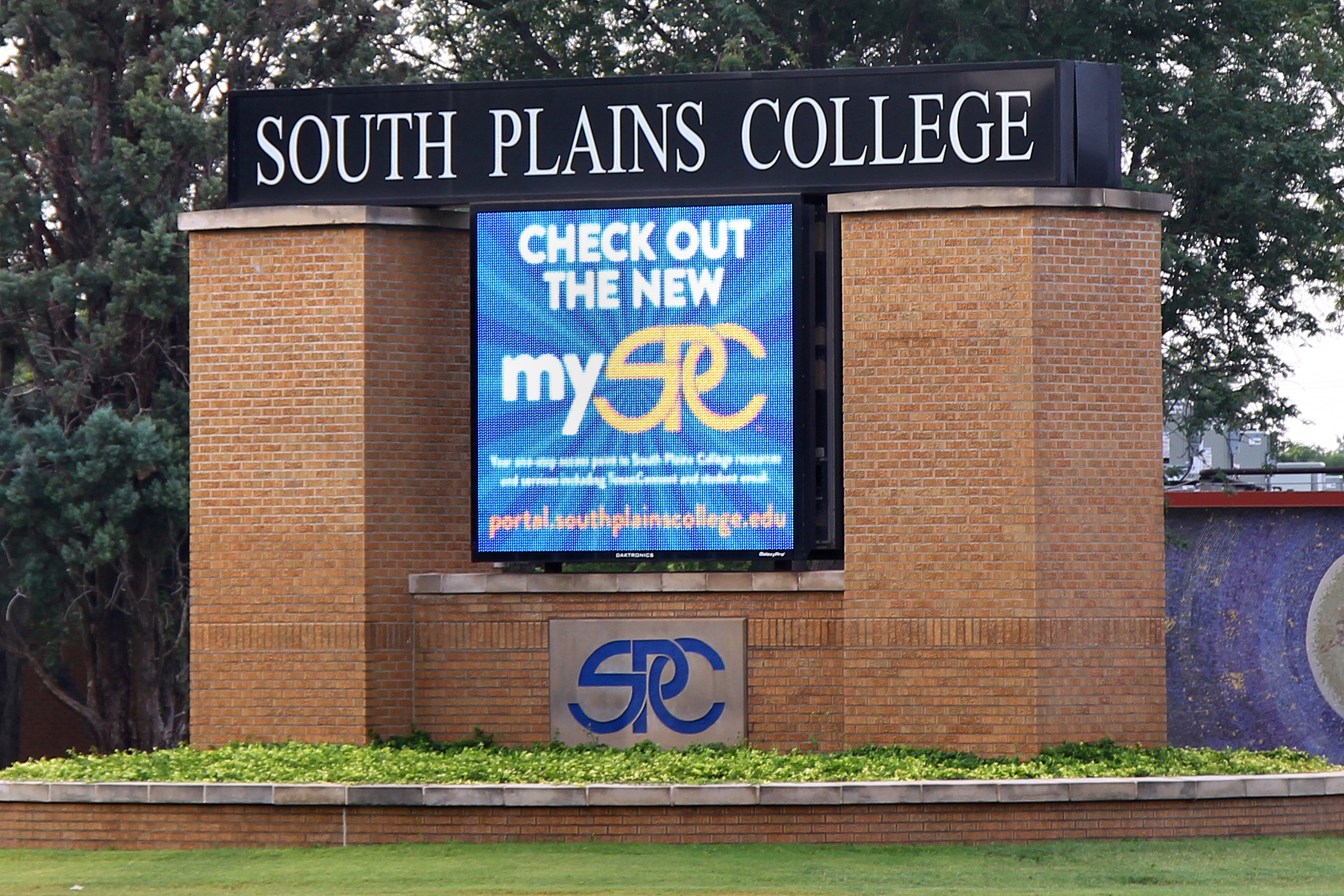
South Plains College Sign Levelland Texas

South Plains College (SPC) is a public community college in Levelland, Texas. It also has five locations in Plainview, at the Reese Technology Center (formerly Reese Air Force Base), in western Lubbock, the Lubbock Downtown Center and the Career and Technical Center.

SPC offers many classes virtually.

== Service area ==
As defined by the Texas Legislature, the official service area of South Plains College is:

- The Whiteface Consolidated Independent School District
- All of Bailey, Lamb, Hale, Floyd, Motley, Cochran, Hockley, Lubbock, Crosby, Yoakum, Terry, Lynn, and Garza Counties
- All of Gaines County, excluding the portion within the Seminole Independent School District

== Campus ==
The Levelland Campus has 12 dormitories for students. Their total capacity is 774 occupants.

== Athletics ==
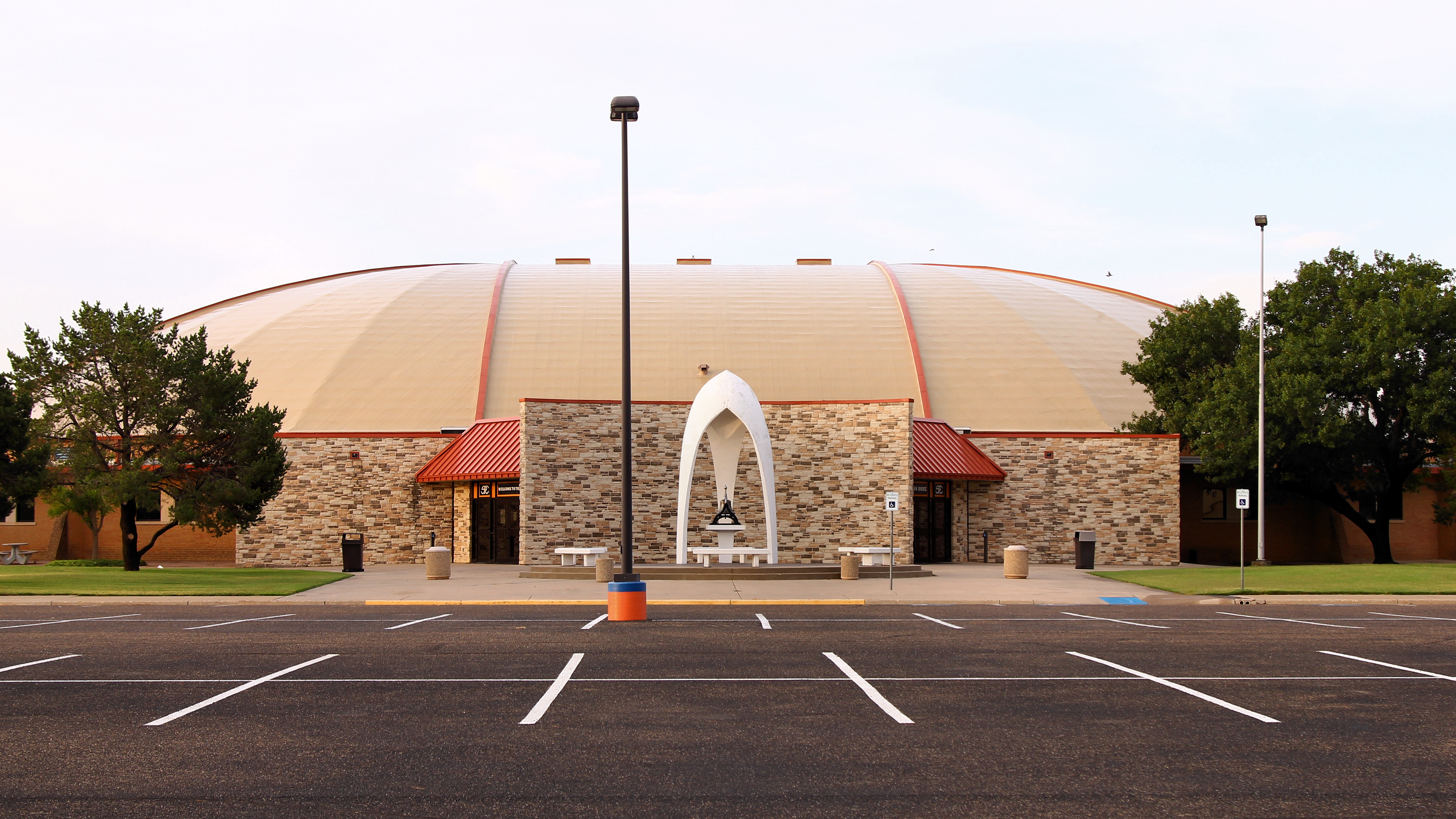
The Texan Dome at South Plains College.

South Plains College plays as part of the Western Junior College Athletic Conference in athletics. It is also part of the National Junior College Athletic Association Region 5. The school participates in men's and women's basketball, cheerleading, cross-country, track and field, and rodeo. All the men's and women's basketball games are broadcast as part of the High Plains Radio Network under HPRN Sports on KLVT and online.

== Notable alumni ==
- Rondell Bartholomew, sprinter
- Robert Dunning (born 1997), American hurdler
- Waylon Jennings, country music singer
- Stanton Kidd, professional basketball player in the Japanese B.League
- Phillimon Hanneck, Olympian, middle-distance 1500 meters and 5000 meters
- Tranel Hawkins, Olympic track and field athlete
- Mbarak Hussein, distance runner
- Fred Kerley, track sprinter, seventh-fastest man at 400 meters
- Sally Kipyego, championship runner for the Texas Tech Red Raiders, first Kenyan woman to win an NCAA cross-country individual championship
- Natalie Maines, country singer (Dixie Chicks)
- Renaldo Major, NBA player
- Bo Outlaw,NBA player
- Renny Quow, Olympian, sprinter
- Sheryl Swoopes, championship basketball player for the Texas Tech Red Raiders, former WNBA player and coach
- LaToy Williams, sprinter
- Lee Ann Womack, country singer
- Myron Gardner, NBA player
