= Whitharral Independent School District =

School district in Texas

Coordinates: 33°44′17″N 102°19′36″W

Whitharral Independent School District is a public school district based in the community of Whitharral, Texas, United States. The district has one school that serves students from kindergarten through grade 12.

== Academic achievement ==
In 2009, the school district was rated "recognized" by the Texas Education Agency.

== Special programs ==
=== Athletics ===
Whitharral High School plays six-man football.

== Controversy ==
In July 2024, the ACLU of Texas sent Whitharral Independent School District a letter, alleging that the district's 2023-2024 dress and grooming code appeared to violate the Texas CROWN Act, a state law that prohibits racial discrimination based on hair texture or styles, and asking the district to revise its policies for the 2024-2025 school year.

== See also ==
- List of school districts in Texas
