= Gene Mayfield =

American football player and coach (1928–2009)

Biographical details
- Born: January 31, 1928; Quitaque, Texas, U.S.
- Died: October 2, 2009 (aged 81); Lubbock, Texas, U.S.

Playing career
- 1950s: West Texas State
- Position: Quarterback

Coaching career (HC unless noted)
- 1956–1957: Littlefield HS (TX)
- 1958–1964: Borger HS (TX)
- 1965–1970: Permian HS (TX)
- 1971–1976: West Texas State
- 1982–1987: Levelland HS (TX)

Administrative career (AD unless noted)
- 1971–1977: West Texas State

Head coaching record
- Overall: 24–39–2 (college); 178–71–8 (high school)

Accomplishments and honors

Championships
- MVC (1972); 4A Texas state (1965)

Clurel Eugene Mayfield (January 31, 1928 – October 2, 2009) was an American football coach at the high school and college levels in Texas.

Mayfield played as a quarterback at West Texas State University—now known as West Texas A&M University—where he also met his future wife, Mary Jean. He began his head coaching career at Littlefield before moving on to Borger in 1958. His 1962 Borger squad made the 4A state championship game, losing, 30–26, to San Antonio Brackenridge. In 1965, Mayfield took over head coaching duties at Permian High School of Odessa, Texas, where he started the school's winning tradition by beating San Antonio Lee, 11–6, for the 4A state championship. Mayfield was only the fifth head coach in Texas' highest classification to win a state championship in his first year. Odessa Permian made the state finals on two more occasions, in 1968 and 1970, losing to Austin Reagan each time.

In 1971, Mayfield succeeded Joe E. Kerbel at his alma mater, West Texas State. He had only mediocre success, and left the school after the 1976 season with an overall record of 24–39–2. He retired from coaching in 1977, before returning in 1982 to coach at Levelland for six seasons. Mayfield died on October 2, 2009, from Alzheimer's disease, in Lubbock, Texas.

== Head coaching record ==
=== College ===
Year	Team	Overall	Conference	Standing	Bowl/playoffs
West Texas State Buffaloes (Missouri Valley Conference) (1971–1976)
1971	West Texas State	2–9	1–4	6th	
1972	West Texas State	5–5	4–1	T–1st	
1973	West Texas State	2–9	1–5	T–6th	
1974	West Texas State	6–5	3–3	3rd	
1975	West Texas State	5–6	2–2	T–2nd	
1976	West Texas State	4–5–2	1–1–2	T–3rd	
West Texas State:		24–39–2	12–16–2		
Total:		24–39–2			
National championship Conference title Conference division title or championship game berth
