= Meadow, Texas =

- Town
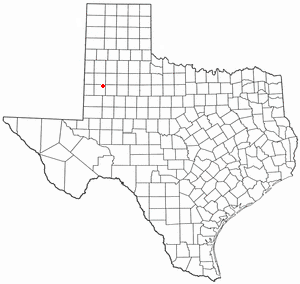
- Location of Meadow, Texas

- Coordinates: 33°20′18″N 102°12′28″W
- Country: United States
- State: Texas
- County: Terry

Area
  - Total: 1.61 sq mi (4.16 km^{2})
  - Land: 1.61 sq mi (4.16 km^{2})
  - Water: 0 sq mi (0.00 km^{2})
- Elevation: 3,333 ft (1,016 m)

Population (2020)
  - Total: 601
  - Density: 374/sq mi (144/km^{2})
- Time zone: UTC-6 (Central (CST))
  - Summer (DST): UTC-5 (CDT)
- ZIP code: 79345
- Area code: 806
- FIPS code: 48-47316
- GNIS feature ID: 1362550
- Website: https://www.meadow.texas.gov/

Meadow is a town in Terry County, Texas, United States. The population was 601 at the 2020 census.

== Geography ==
Meadow is located at 33°20′18″N 102°12′28″W (33.338336, –102.207772).

According to the United States Census Bureau, the town has a total area of 1.6 square miles (4.1 km^{2}), all land.

== Demographics ==
Historical population
Census	Pop.	Note	%±
1930	324		—
1940	408		25.9%
1950	490		20.1%
1960	484		−1.2%
1970	491		1.4%
1980	571		16.3%
1990	547		−4.2%
2000	658		20.3%
2010	593		−9.9%
2020	601		1.3%
U.S. Decennial Census; 2020 Census

As of the census of 2000, 658 people, 213 households, and 177 families resided in the town. The population density was 411.3 inhabitants per square mile (158.8/km^{2}). The 236 housing units averaged 147.5 per square mile (57.0/km^{2}). The racial makeup of the town was 78.12% White, 0.15% African American, 1.22% Native American, 15.35% from other races, and 5.17% from two or more races. Hispanics or Latinos of any race were 57.90% of the population.

Of the 213 households, 43.2% had children under the age of 18 living with them, 70.9% were married couples living together, 8.5% had a female householder with no husband present, and 16.9% were not families. About 15.5% of all households were made up of individuals, and 8.0% had someone living alone who was 65 years of age or older. The average household size was 3.09 and the average family size was 3.42.

In the town, the population was distributed as 33.3% under the age of 18, 8.8% from 18 to 24, 28.7% from 25 to 44, 18.2% from 45 to 64, and 10.9% who were 65 years of age or older. The median age was 31 years. For every 100 females, there were 109.6 males. For every 100 females age 18 and over, there were 102.3 males.

The median income for a household in the town was $29,250, and for a family was $34,167. Males had a median income of $25,417 versus $20,694 for females. The per capita income for the town was $11,803. About 15.7% of families and 16.3% of the population were below the poverty line, including 16.0% of those under age 18 and 13.6% of those age 65 or over.

== Education ==
The Town of Meadow is served by the Meadow Independent School District and home to the Meadow High School Broncos.

== Music ==
The Meadow Musical has been held every second Saturday in Meadow for the past 46 years.

== Notable people ==
- Shirley Hooper, 18th Secretary of State of New Mexico (born in Meadow)
- Sonny Curtis, musician and member of The Crickets
