= Terry County, Texas =

County in Texas, United States

- County
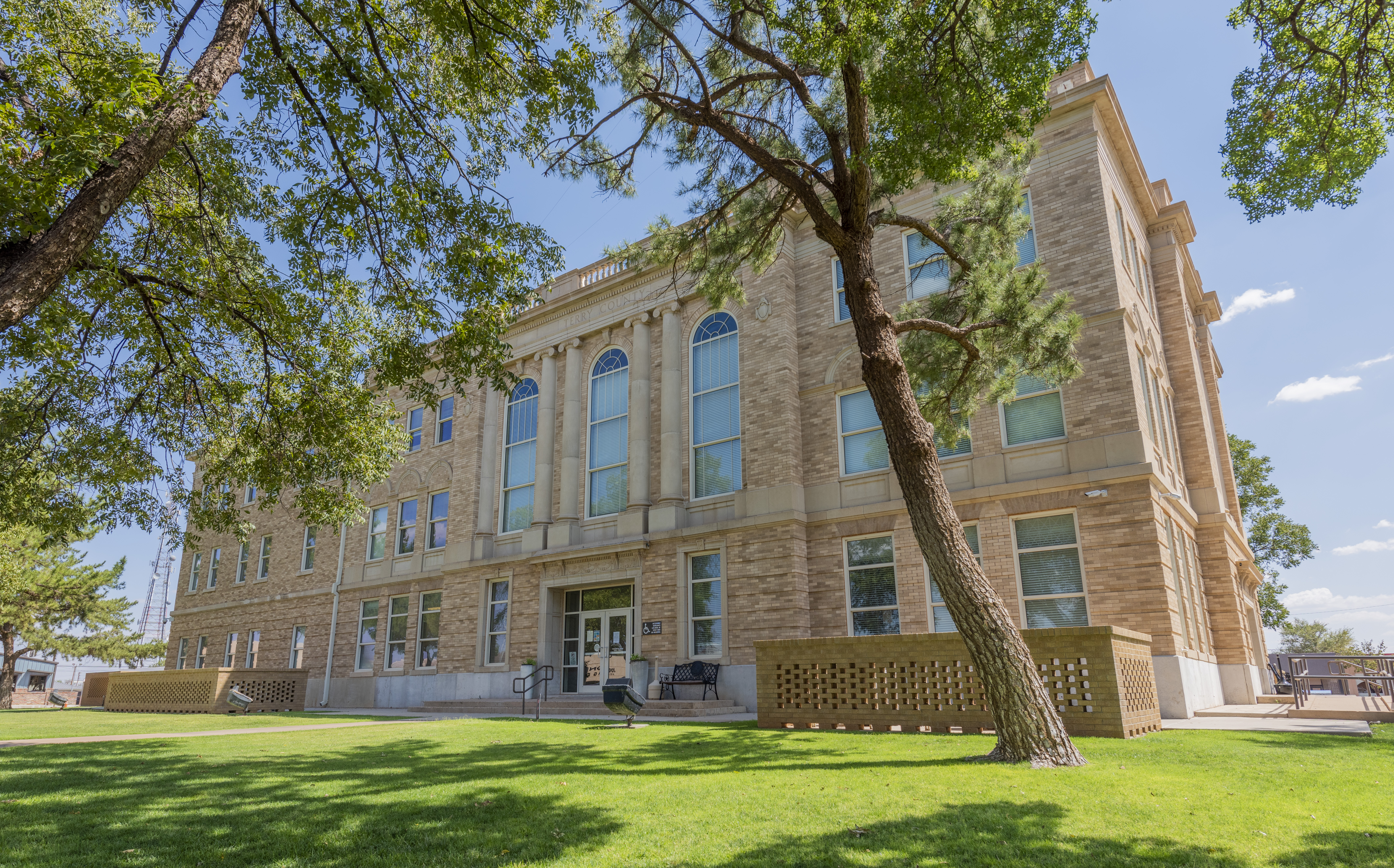
- The Terry County Courthouse in Brownfield

- Location within the U.S. state of Texas
- Coordinates: 33°10′N 102°20′W
- Country: United States
- State: Texas
- Founded: 1904
- Named for: Benjamin Franklin Terry
- Seat: Brownfield
- Largest city: Brownfield

Area
  - Total: 891 sq mi (2,310 km^{2})
  - Land: 889 sq mi (2,300 km^{2})
  - Water: 2.1 sq mi (5.4 km^{2}) 0.2%

Population (2020)
  - Total: 11,831
  - Estimate (2025): 11,720 ▼
  - Density: 13.3/sq mi (5.14/km^{2})
- Time zone: UTC−6 (Central)
  - Summer (DST): UTC−5 (CDT)
- Congressional district: 19th
- Website: www.co.terry.tx.us

Terry County is a county located in the U.S. state of Texas. As of the 2020 census, its population was 11,831. Its county seat is Brownfield. The county was demarked in 1876 and organized in 1904. It is named for Benjamin Franklin Terry, a colonel in the Confederate Army. Terry County was one of 46 dry counties in the state of Texas, but is now a moist county. Terry County is one of the most productive pumpkin producing counties in the United States.

== History ==
Terry County was formed from Bexar County in 1876 and named for Col. Benjamin Franklin Terry, who commanded the Terry's Texas Rangers in the Civil War.

In 1877, the ill-fated Nolan Expedition crossed the county in search of livestock stolen by Comanche renegades. The various Indian tribes had moved on by the time of white settlement, due to the depletion of the buffalo herds by hunters.

Terry County was organized in 1904, with Brownfield as the county seat.

The county was settled by ranchers such as Ira J. Coulver, J. R. Quinn, Englishman Q. Bone, and Marion V. Brownfield. By 1910 Terry County had 235 farms and 23,000 acres (93 km^{2}) of improved land, with corn being the most important crop.

Terry County lies in the oil-rich north Permian Basin, and the discovery of oil in 1940 quickly led to production. By 1991 almost 363,143,000 barrels (57,735,100 m^{3}) of crude had been extracted from Terry County lands since 1940.

In 1991, Terry County was among the leading cotton counties in Texas.

== Geography ==
According to the U.S. Census Bureau, the county has a total area of 891 square miles (2,310 km^{2}), of which 889 square miles (2,300 km^{2}) are land and 2.1 square miles (5.4 km^{2}) (0.2%) are covered by water.

=== Major highways ===
- U.S. Highway 62
- U.S. Highway 82
- U.S. Highway 380
- U.S. Highway 385
- State Highway 137

=== Adjacent counties ===
- Hockley County (north)
- Lynn County (east)
- Dawson County (southeast)
- Gaines County (south)
- Yoakum County (west)
- Cochran County (northwest)
- Lubbock County (northeast)

== Demographics ==
Historical population
Census	Pop.	Note	%±
1890	21		—
1900	48		128.6%
1910	1,474		2,970.8%
1920	2,236		51.7%
1930	8,883		297.3%
1940	11,160		25.6%
1950	13,107		17.4%
1960	16,286		24.3%
1970	14,118		−13.3%
1980	14,581		3.3%
1990	13,218		−9.3%
2000	12,761		−3.5%
2010	12,651		−0.9%
2020	11,831		−6.5%
2025 (est.)	11,720	▼	−0.9%
U.S. Decennial Census; 1850–2010 2010 2020

=== Racial and ethnic composition ===
Terry County, Texas – Racial and ethnic composition Note: the US Census treats Hispanic/Latino as an ethnic category. This table excludes Latinos from the racial categories and assigns them to a separate category. Hispanics/Latinos may be of any race.
Race / Ethnicity (NH = Non-Hispanic)	Pop 2000	Pop 2010	Pop 2020	% 2000	% 2010	% 2020
White alone (NH)	6,351	5,747	4,599	49.77%	45.43%	38.87%
Black or African American alone (NH)	617	565	389	4.84%	4.47%	3.29%
Native American or Alaska Native alone (NH)	31	28	29	0.24%	0.22%	0.25%
Asian alone (NH)	18	23	37	0.14%	0.18%	0.31%
Pacific Islander alone (NH)	3	0	0	0.02%	0.00%	0.00%
Other race alone (NH)	13	5	24	0.10%	0.04%	0.20%
Mixed race or Multiracial (NH)	102	72	184	0.80%	0.57%	1.56%
Hispanic or Latino (any race)	5,626	6,211	6,569	44.09%	49.09%	55.52%
Total	12,761	12,651	11,831	100.00%	100.00%	100.00%

=== 2020 census ===
As of the 2020 census, the county had a population of 11,831. The median age was 35.6 years. 27.5% of residents were under the age of 18 and 15.4% of residents were 65 years of age or older. For every 100 females there were 105.1 males, and for every 100 females age 18 and over there were 106.0 males age 18 and over.

The racial makeup of the county was 58.6% White, 3.8% Black or African American, 0.6% American Indian and Alaska Native, 0.3% Asian, <0.1% Native Hawaiian and Pacific Islander, 14.8% from some other race, and 21.8% from two or more races. Hispanic or Latino residents of any race comprised 55.5% of the population.

69.9% of residents lived in urban areas, while 30.1% lived in rural areas.

There were 4,010 households in the county, of which 37.3% had children under the age of 18 living in them. Of all households, 49.6% were married-couple households, 17.5% were households with a male householder and no spouse or partner present, and 26.9% were households with a female householder and no spouse or partner present. About 25.4% of all households were made up of individuals and 12.7% had someone living alone who was 65 years of age or older.

There were 4,789 housing units, of which 16.3% were vacant. Among occupied housing units, 68.3% were owner-occupied and 31.7% were renter-occupied. The homeowner vacancy rate was 2.9% and the rental vacancy rate was 12.0%.

=== 2000 census ===
As of the census of 2000, 12,761 people, 4,278 households, and 3,247 families were residing in the county. The population density was 14 people per square mile (5.4 people/km^{2}). The 5,087 housing units had an average density of 6 units per square mile (2.3 units/km^{2}). The racial makeup of the county was 76.55% White, 5.00% African American, 0.53% Native American, 0.22% Asian, 14.30% from other races, and 3.40% from two or more races. About 44.09% of the population were Hispanics or Latinos of any race.

Of the 4,278 households, 35.80% had children under the age of 18 living with them, 59.70% were married couples living together, 11.90% had a female householder with no husband present, and 24.10% were not families. About 22.10% of all households were made up of individuals, and 12.30% had someone living alone who was 65 years of age or older. The average household size was 2.76, and the average family size was 3.23.

The county's age distribution was 28.40% under 18, 9.50% from 18 to 24, 27.00% from 25 to 44, 20.60% from 45 to 64, and 14.60% who were 65 or older. The median age was 35 years. For every 100 females, there were 108.00 males. For every 100 females age 18 and over, there were 109.50 males.

The median income for a household in the county was $28,090, and for a family was $33,339. Males had a median income of $24,321 versus $20,131 for females. The per capita income for the county was $13,860. About 19.20% of families and 23.30% of the population were below the poverty line, including 32.50% of those under age 18 and 13.90% of those age 65 or over.

== Media ==
The county is served by a weekly newspaper, nearby station KPET 690 AM (Lamesa), and the various Lubbock radio and TV stations. KKUB-AM and KTTU-FM are licensed to Brownfield, but operate primarily from offices and studios in Lubbock.

== Communities ==
=== Cities ===
- Brownfield (county seat)
- Wellman

=== Town ===
- Meadow

=== Unincorporated communities ===
- Needmore
- Tokio

== Politics ==
Terry County is located within District 83 of the Texas House of Representatives. Terry County is located within District 28 of the Texas Senate.

United States presidential election results for Terry County, Texas
Year	Republican		Democratic		Third party(ies)	
Year	No.	%	No.	%	No.	%
1912	6	5.71%	96	91.43%	3	2.86%
1916	1	0.68%	146	99.32%	0	0.00%
1920	39	10.99%	270	76.06%	46	12.96%
1924	160	15.98%	823	82.22%	18	1.80%
1928	622	60.45%	407	39.55%	0	0.00%
1932	87	5.64%	1,448	93.84%	8	0.52%
1936	87	5.06%	1,619	94.18%	13	0.76%
1940	145	6.41%	2,116	93.59%	0	0.00%
1944	273	9.82%	2,304	82.88%	203	7.30%
1948	236	8.79%	2,283	85.03%	166	6.18%
1952	1,823	46.37%	2,105	53.55%	3	0.08%
1956	1,473	41.78%	2,050	58.14%	3	0.09%
1960	1,908	45.84%	2,237	53.75%	17	0.41%
1964	1,592	34.37%	3,034	65.50%	6	0.13%
1968	1,948	44.00%	1,625	36.71%	854	19.29%
1972	3,057	72.96%	1,099	26.23%	34	0.81%
1976	2,113	42.25%	2,859	57.17%	29	0.58%
1980	3,178	61.17%	1,945	37.44%	72	1.39%
1984	3,181	67.34%	1,535	32.49%	8	0.17%
1988	2,645	57.50%	1,941	42.20%	14	0.30%
1992	2,309	52.54%	1,461	33.24%	625	14.22%
1996	2,013	56.43%	1,272	35.66%	282	7.91%
2000	2,910	71.78%	1,108	27.33%	36	0.89%
2004	3,166	79.75%	794	20.00%	10	0.25%
2008	2,879	67.27%	1,379	32.22%	22	0.51%
2012	2,602	70.15%	1,059	28.55%	48	1.29%
2016	2,459	73.29%	753	22.44%	143	4.26%
2020	2,812	77.85%	757	20.96%	43	1.19%
2024	2,815	82.31%	587	17.16%	18	0.53%

United States Senate election results for Terry County, Texas1
Year	Republican		Democratic		Third party(ies)	
Year	No.	%	No.	%	No.	%
2024	2,663	79.56%	609	18.20%	75	2.24%

United States Senate election results for Terry County, Texas2
Year	Republican		Democratic		Third party(ies)	
Year	No.	%	No.	%	No.	%
2020	2,731	77.50%	714	20.26%	79	2.24%

Texas Gubernatorial election results for Terry County
Year	Republican		Democratic		Third party(ies)	
Year	No.	%	No.	%	No.	%
2022	2,167	83.67%	377	14.56%	46	1.78%

== Education ==
School districts serving the county include:

- Brownfield Independent School District
- Dawson Independent School District
- Loop Independent School District
- Meadow Independent School District
- O'Donnell Independent School District
- Ropes Independent School District
- Seagraves Independent School District
- Tahoka Independent School District
- Wellman-Union Consolidated Independent School District

The county is in the service area of South Plains College.

== See also ==
- Recorded Texas Historic Landmarks in Terry County
