= Hockley County, Texas =

County in Texas, United States

- County
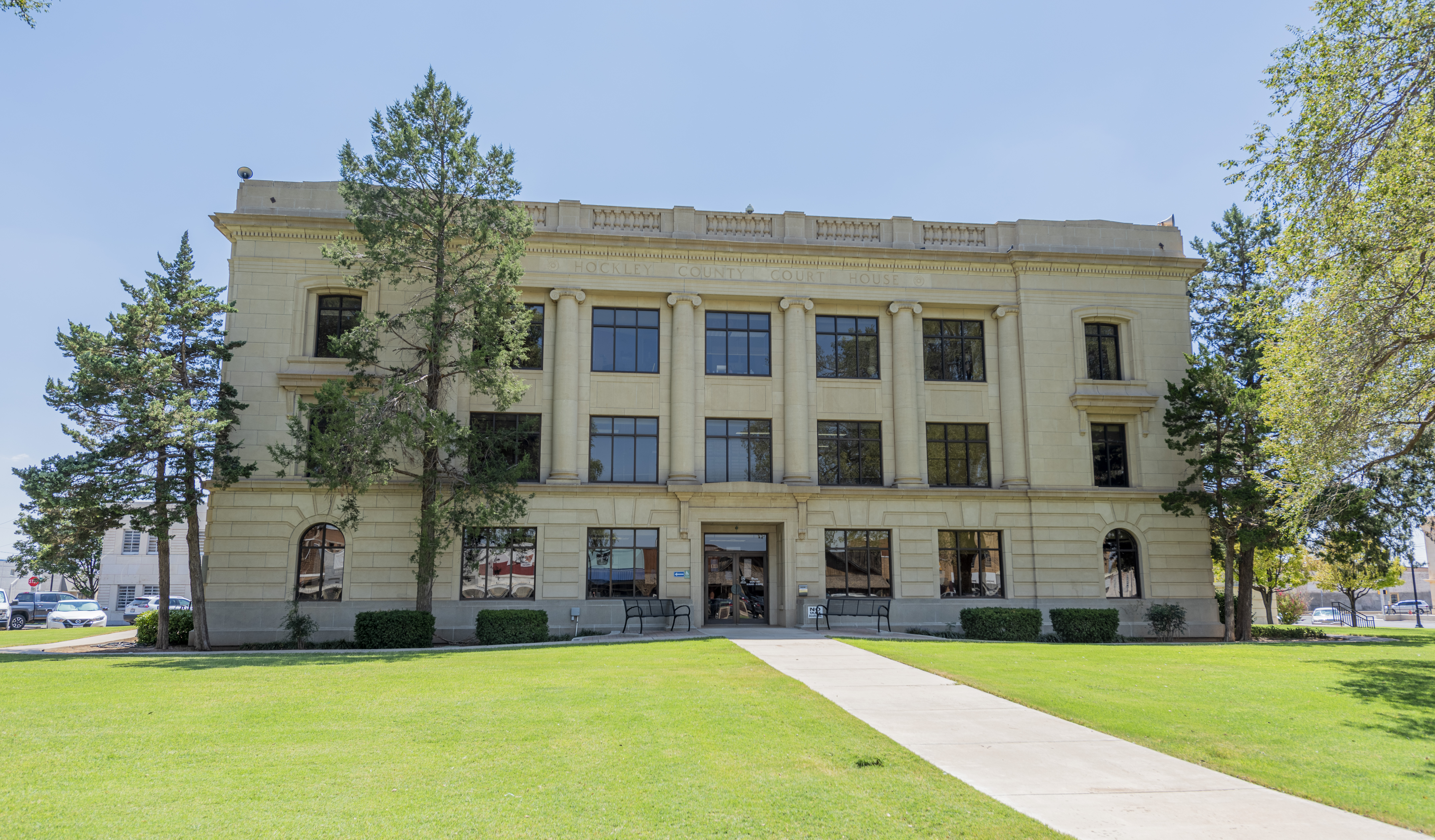
- The Hockley County Courthouse in Levelland

- Location within the U.S. state of Texas
- Coordinates: 33°37′N 102°20′W
- Country: United States
- State: Texas
- Founded: 1921
- Named for: George Washington Hockley
- Seat: Levelland
- Largest city: Levelland

Area
  - Total: 909 sq mi (2,350 km^{2})
  - Land: 908 sq mi (2,350 km^{2})
  - Water: 0.2 sq mi (0.52 km^{2}) 0.02%

Population (2020)
  - Total: 21,537
  - Estimate (2025): 21,600 ▲
  - Density: 23.7/sq mi (9.16/km^{2})
- Time zone: UTC−6 (Central)
  - Summer (DST): UTC−5 (CDT)
- Congressional district: 19th
- Website: www.co.hockley.tx.us

Hockley County is a county located in the U.S. state of Texas. As of the 2020 census, its population was 21,537. Its county seat is Levelland. The county was created in 1876, but not organized until 1921. It is named for George Washington Hockley, a secretary of war of the Republic of Texas.

Hockley County comprises the Levelland micropolitan statistical area, which is included in the Lubbock–Levelland combined statistical area.

== History ==
Hockley County was formed in 1876 from portions of Bexar and Young Counties. It was named for George Washington Hockley, the commander of artillery in the Battle of San Jacinto and later secretary of war of the Republic of Texas.

== Geography ==
According to the U.S. Census Bureau, the county has a total area of 909 square miles (2,350 km^{2}), of which 0.2 sq mi (0.52 km^{2}) (0.02%) is covered by water.

=== Major highways ===
- U.S. Highway 62/U.S. Highway 82
- U.S. Highway 84
- U.S. Highway 385
- State Highway 114

=== Adjacent counties ===
- Lamb County (north)
- Lubbock County (east)
- Terry County (south)
- Cochran County (west)
- Yoakum County (southwest)
- Bailey County (northwest)
- Hale County (northeast)
- Lynn County (southeast)

== Demographics ==
Historical population
Census	Pop.	Note	%±
1900	44		—
1910	137		211.4%
1920	137		0.0%
1930	9,298		6,686.9%
1940	12,693		36.5%
1950	20,407		60.8%
1960	22,340		9.5%
1970	20,396		−8.7%
1980	23,230		13.9%
1990	24,199		4.2%
2000	22,716		−6.1%
2010	22,935		1.0%
2020	21,537		−6.1%
2025 (est.)	21,600	▲	0.3%
U.S. Decennial Census; 1850–2010 2010 2020

=== 2020 census ===
As of the 2020 census, the county had a population of 21,537. The median age was 37.1 years; 26.0% of residents were under 18, and 16.4% were 65 or older. For every 100 females, there were 96.3 males, and for every 100 females 18 and over, there were 93.7 males 18 and over.

The racial makeup of the county was 63.9% White, 3.0% Black or African American, 1.1% American Indian and Alaska Native, 0.2% Asian, <0.1% Native Hawaiian and Pacific Islander, 14.9% from some other race, and 16.9% from two or more races. Hispanic or Latino residents of any race comprised 49.3% of the population.

About 58.5% of residents lived in urban areas, while 41.5% lived in rural areas.

The county had 7,954 households, of which 35.4% had children under 18 living in them, 51.9% were married-couple households, 17.3% were households with a male householder and no spouse or partner present, and 25.5% were households with a female householder and no spouse or partner present. About 24.5% of all households were made up of individuals, and 11.1% had someone living alone who was 65 or older.

Of the 9,173 housing units, 13.3% were vacant. Among occupied housing units, 72.5% were owner-occupied and 27.5% were renter-occupied. The homeowner vacancy rate was 1.7% and the rental vacancy rate was 14.4%.

=== Racial and ethnic composition ===
Hockley County, Texas – Racial and ethnic composition Note: the US Census treats Hispanic/Latino as an ethnic category. This table excludes Latinos from the racial categories and assigns them to a separate category. Hispanics/Latinos may be of any race.
Race / Ethnicity (NH = Non-Hispanic)	Pop 2000	Pop 2010	Pop 2020	% 2000	% 2010	% 2020
White alone (NH)	13,155	11,795	9,752	57.91%	51.43%	45.28%
Black or African American alone (NH)	822	801	565	3.62%	3.49%	2.62%
Native American or Alaska Native alone (NH)	83	83	82	0.37%	0.36%	0.38%
Asian alone (NH)	29	60	49	0.13%	0.26%	0.23%
Pacific Islander alone (NH)	2	3	4	0.01%	0.01%	0.02%
Other race alone (NH)	10	39	59	0.04%	0.17%	0.27%
Multiracial (NH)	156	161	402	0.69%	0.70%	1.87%
Hispanic or Latino (any race)	8,459	9,993	10,624	37.24%	43.57%	49.33%
Total	22,716	22,935	21,537	100.00%	100.00%	100.00%

=== 2000 census ===
As of the 2000 census, 22,716 people, 7,994 households, and 6,091 families resided in the county. The population density was 25 people per square mile (9.7 people/km^{2}). The 9,148 housing units averaged 10 units per square mile (3.9/km^{2}). The racial makeup of the county was 74.38% White, 3.72% Black or African American, 0.82% Native American, 0.13% Asian, 0.04% Pacific Islander, 18.68% from other races, and 2.22% from two or more races. About 37.24% of the population was Hispanic or Latino of any race.

Of the 7,994 households, 38.1% had children under 18 living with them, 60.4% were married couples living together, 11.5% had a female householder with no husband present, and 23.8% were not families; 21.2% of all households were made up of individuals, and 10.0% had someone living alone who was 65 or older. The average household size was 2.77 and the average family size was 3.22.

In the county, the age distribution was 29.1% under 18, 11.8% from 18 to 24, 25.9% from 25 to 44, 20.6% from 45 to 64, and 12.6% who were 65 or older. The median age was 33 years. For every 100 females, there were 96.3 males. For every 100 females 18 and over, there were 92.2 males.

The median income in the county for a household was $31,085 and for a family was $35,288. Males had a median income of $29,735 versus $20,671 for females. The per capita income for the county was $15,022. About 14.80% of families and 18.90% of the population were below the poverty line, including 24.1% of those under 18 and 12.6% of those 65 or over.

== Communities ==
=== Cities ===
- Anton
- Levelland (county seat)
- Ropesville

=== Towns ===
- Opdyke West
- Smyer
- Sundown

=== Census-designated place ===
- Whitharral

=== Unincorporated communities ===
- Pep
- Roundup

== Politics ==
Hockley County is located within District 88 of the Texas House of Representatives. Hockley County is located within District 28 of the Texas Senate.

United States presidential election results for Hockley County, Texas
Year	Republican		Democratic		Third party(ies)	
Year	No.	%	No.	%	No.	%
1924	20	21.28%	69	73.40%	5	5.32%
1928	765	75.82%	235	23.29%	9	0.89%
1932	76	4.68%	1,513	93.22%	34	2.09%
1936	90	4.91%	1,731	94.44%	12	0.65%
1940	261	9.85%	2,382	89.92%	6	0.23%
1944	319	9.47%	2,641	78.44%	407	12.09%
1948	346	9.53%	3,071	84.58%	214	5.89%
1952	2,651	47.17%	2,962	52.70%	7	0.12%
1956	2,001	38.58%	3,175	61.22%	10	0.19%
1960	2,159	40.29%	3,169	59.15%	30	0.56%
1964	1,674	29.20%	4,049	70.63%	10	0.17%
1968	2,265	36.85%	2,426	39.47%	1,456	23.69%
1972	4,084	70.84%	1,625	28.19%	56	0.97%
1976	3,137	44.00%	3,949	55.39%	44	0.62%
1980	4,599	64.03%	2,447	34.07%	137	1.91%
1984	5,462	72.39%	2,044	27.09%	39	0.52%
1988	4,368	60.25%	2,850	39.31%	32	0.44%
1992	4,261	54.16%	2,301	29.25%	1,306	16.60%
1996	4,230	60.86%	2,170	31.22%	550	7.91%
2000	5,250	77.84%	1,419	21.04%	76	1.13%
2004	6,160	81.30%	1,385	18.28%	32	0.42%
2008	5,795	75.80%	1,797	23.51%	53	0.69%
2012	5,546	77.74%	1,486	20.83%	102	1.43%
2016	5,809	79.46%	1,260	17.23%	242	3.31%
2020	6,536	80.67%	1,482	18.29%	84	1.04%
2024	6,616	82.82%	1,323	16.56%	49	0.61%

United States Senate election results for Hockley County, Texas1
Year	Republican		Democratic		Third party(ies)	
Year	No.	%	No.	%	No.	%
2024	6,437	80.92%	1,355	17.03%	163	2.05%

United States Senate election results for Hockley County, Texas2
Year	Republican		Democratic		Third party(ies)	
Year	No.	%	No.	%	No.	%
2020	6,449	80.71%	1,384	17.32%	157	1.96%

Texas Gubernatorial election results for Hockley County
Year	Republican		Democratic		Third party(ies)	
Year	No.	%	No.	%	No.	%
2022	4,690	84.79%	786	14.21%	55	0.99%

== Education ==
School districts serving the county include:

- Anton Independent School District
- Frenship Independent School District
- Levelland Independent School District
- Ropes Independent School District
- Smyer Independent School District
- Sundown Independent School District
- Whiteface Consolidated Independent School District
- Whitharral Independent School District

The county is in the service area of South Plains College.

== See also ==
- Llano Estacado
- South Plains College
- U.S. Route 84
- West Texas
- Yellow House Draw
- Recorded Texas Historic Landmarks in Hockley County
