= Meadow Independent School District =

School district in Texas

Coordinates: 33.3400°N 102.2106°W

Meadow Independent School District is a public school district based in Meadow, Texas (USA). The district is a single campus district with two schools, Burleson Elementary, serving Pre-K through 5th, and Meadow High School, which serves grades six through twelve.

In 2009, the school district was rated "academically acceptable" by the Texas Education Agency.

== Special programs ==
=== Athletics ===
Meadow High School plays six-man football.
