= Levelland, Texas =

- City
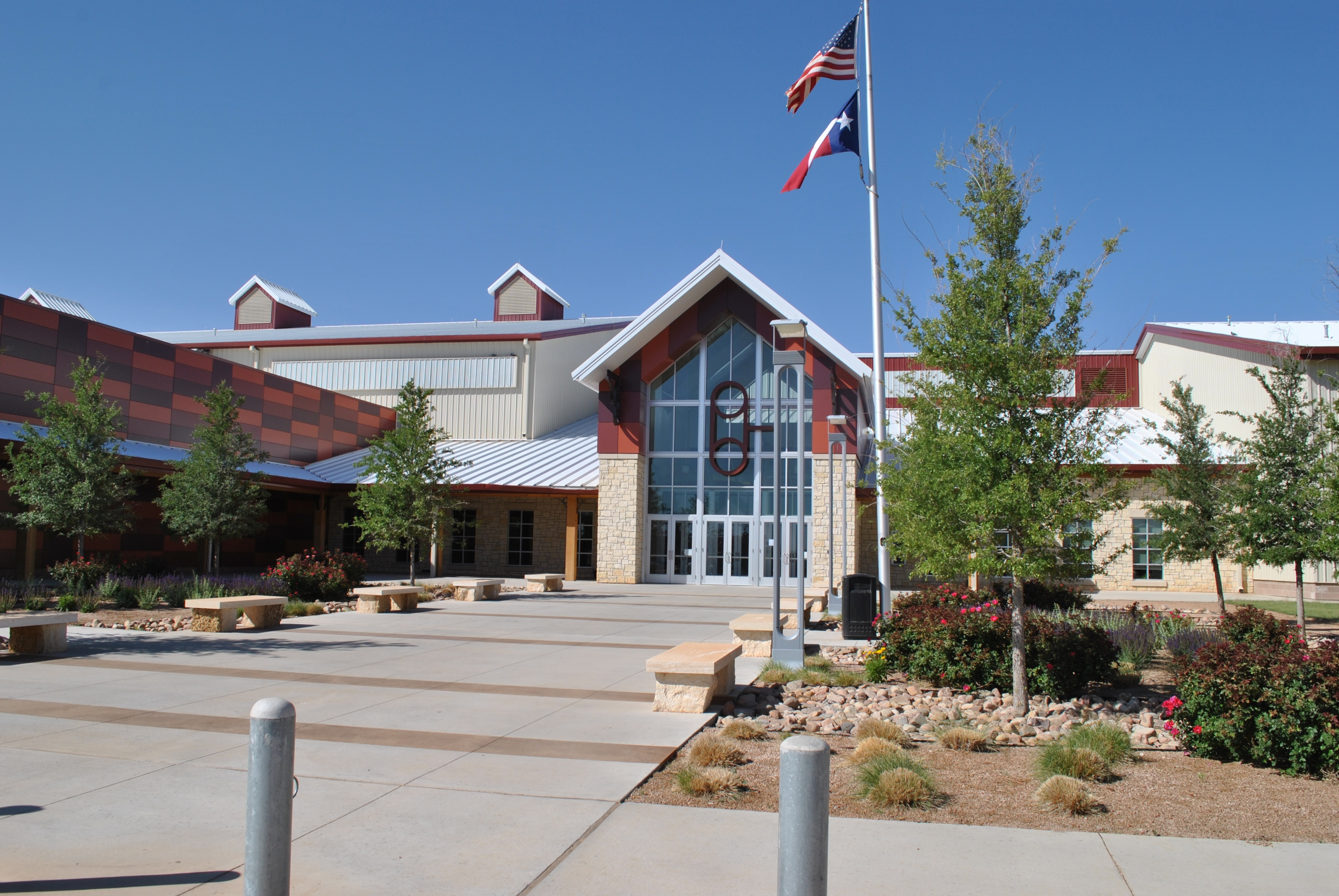
- Mallet Event Center and Rodeo Arena

- Location within Texas
- Coordinates: 33°35′14″N 102°22′41″W
- Country: United States
- State: Texas
- County: Hockley
- Region: Llano Estacado
- Established: 1921

Area
  - Total: 10.21 sq mi (26.45 km^{2})
  - Land: 10.21 sq mi (26.44 km^{2})
  - Water: 0.0039 sq mi (0.01 km^{2})
- Elevation: 3,520 ft (1,070 m)

Population (2020)
  - Total: 12,652
  - Density: 1,239.4/sq mi (478.52/km^{2})
- Time zone: UTC-6 (CST)
- ZIP code: 79336, 79338
- Area code: 806
- FIPS code: 48-42448
- GNIS ID: 1361113
- Website: www.levellandtexas.org

Levelland is a city in and the county seat of Hockley County, Texas, United States. As of the 2020 census, the city population was 12,652, down from 13,542 at the 2010 census. It is located on the Llano Estacado, 30 miles (48 km) west of Lubbock. Major industries include cotton farming and petroleum production. It is the home of South Plains College. Levelland was so named on account of the flat land at the town site.

== History ==
Levelland became the county seat upon its organization in 1921. Initially named Hockley City by Charles W. Post in 1912, development began in 1921, and the town was swiftly renamed for its local topography. The town's foundation was further solidified with the commencement of Santa Fe Railroad service in July 1925. Levelland's 100th birthday is on April 11, 2026

The 1950s oil boom led to the establishment of a refinery and gas plant.

Levelland experienced civic development, including the opening of a municipal park in 1951 through fundraising by civic clubs. Infrastructure improvements, an airfield, road systems, and a hospital, were undertaken around the same time. The town established a county library in the 1950s and the South Plains Museum in 1968. South Plains College, a two-year community college, opened in 1958.

== Geography ==
Levelland is at the center of Hockley County. Texas State Highway 114 runs through the north side of the city, leading east 30 miles (48 km) to Lubbock and west 43 miles (69 km) to the New Mexico border. U.S. Route 385 passes through the center of the city, east of downtown, leading north 24 miles (39 km) to Littlefield and south 29 miles (47 km) to Brownfield.

According to the United States Census Bureau, Levelland has a total area of 10.2 square miles (26.3 km^{2}), of which 0.004 square miles (0.01 km^{2}), or 0.06%, is covered by water.

=== Climate ===
Levelland has a semi-arid climate (Köppen: Bsk) with generally low relative humidity levels.

Climate data for Levelland, Texas (1991–2020 normals, extremes 1937–1943, 1946–present)
Month	Jan	Feb	Mar	Apr	May	Jun	Jul	Aug	Sep	Oct	Nov	Dec	Year
Record high °F (°C)	82 (28)	88 (31)	95 (35)	101 (38)	111 (44)	115 (46)	111 (44)	106 (41)	105 (41)	103 (39)	94 (34)	82 (28)	115 (46)
Mean maximum °F (°C)	74.7 (23.7)	79.1 (26.2)	85.9 (29.9)	91.4 (33.0)	98.4 (36.9)	102.8 (39.3)	101.8 (38.8)	99.5 (37.5)	96.2 (35.7)	91.1 (32.8)	81.9 (27.7)	74.0 (23.3)	105.0 (40.6)
Mean daily maximum °F (°C)	53.7 (12.1)	58.5 (14.7)	66.5 (19.2)	75.2 (24.0)	83.7 (28.7)	91.3 (32.9)	92.4 (33.6)	90.5 (32.5)	83.5 (28.6)	74.7 (23.7)	62.7 (17.1)	54.4 (12.4)	73.9 (23.3)
Daily mean °F (°C)	39.5 (4.2)	43.3 (6.3)	50.8 (10.4)	58.9 (14.9)	68.5 (20.3)	77.1 (25.1)	79.0 (26.1)	77.3 (25.2)	70.2 (21.2)	60.0 (15.6)	48.2 (9.0)	40.5 (4.7)	59.4 (15.2)
Mean daily minimum °F (°C)	25.2 (−3.8)	28.2 (−2.1)	35.0 (1.7)	42.6 (5.9)	53.4 (11.9)	62.8 (17.1)	65.6 (18.7)	64.1 (17.8)	57.0 (13.9)	45.3 (7.4)	33.6 (0.9)	26.6 (−3.0)	44.9 (7.2)
Mean minimum °F (°C)	13.0 (−10.6)	15.3 (−9.3)	20.3 (−6.5)	29.8 (−1.2)	40.5 (4.7)	54.6 (12.6)	60.9 (16.1)	58.5 (14.7)	46.0 (7.8)	30.8 (−0.7)	19.5 (−6.9)	12.8 (−10.7)	8.8 (−12.9)
Record low °F (°C)	−16 (−27)	−8 (−22)	3 (−16)	20 (−7)	26 (−3)	43 (6)	48 (9)	49 (9)	33 (1)	14 (−10)	0 (−18)	−3 (−19)	−16 (−27)
Average precipitation inches (mm)	0.66 (17)	0.60 (15)	1.12 (28)	1.00 (25)	2.40 (61)	2.67 (68)	2.06 (52)	2.29 (58)	2.29 (58)	1.53 (39)	0.87 (22)	0.78 (20)	18.27 (464)
Average snowfall inches (cm)	1.3 (3.3)	1.5 (3.8)	0.5 (1.3)	0.0 (0.0)	0.0 (0.0)	0.0 (0.0)	0.0 (0.0)	0.0 (0.0)	0.0 (0.0)	0.1 (0.25)	0.9 (2.3)	1.9 (4.8)	6.2 (16)
Average precipitation days (≥ 0.01 in)	3.8	4.1	4.8	3.9	6.0	6.8	6.4	7.4	6.2	5.4	3.9	4.0	62.7
Average snowy days (≥ 0.1 in)	1.3	1.0	0.6	0.1	0.0	0.0	0.0	0.0	0.0	0.1	0.5	1.2	4.8
Source: NOAA

== Demographics ==
Historical population
Census	Pop.	Note	%±
1930	1,661		—
1940	3,091		86.1%
1950	8,264		167.4%
1960	10,153		22.9%
1970	11,445		12.7%
1980	13,809		20.7%
1990	13,986		1.3%
2000	12,866		−8.0%
2010	13,542		5.3%
2020	12,652		−6.6%
U.S. Decennial Census

Levelland is the principal city of the Levelland micropolitan statistical area, which includes all of Hockley County and part of the larger Lubbock–Levelland combined statistical area.

=== 2020 census ===
As of the 2020 census, Levelland had a population of 12,652, 4,642 households, and 3,245 families residing in the city.

As of the 2020 census, the median age was 34.9 years, 26.8% of residents were under the age of 18, and 16.0% of residents were 65 years of age or older. For every 100 females there were 93.3 males, and for every 100 females age 18 and over there were 89.6 males age 18 and over.

As of the 2020 census, 97.1% of residents lived in urban areas, while 2.9% lived in rural areas.

There were 4,642 households in Levelland, of which 36.0% had children under the age of 18 living in them. Of all households, 48.3% were married-couple households, 16.5% were households with a male householder and no spouse or partner present, and 29.1% were households with a female householder and no spouse or partner present. About 26.1% of all households were made up of individuals and 11.6% had someone living alone who was 65 years of age or older.

There were 5,342 housing units, of which 13.1% were vacant. The homeowner vacancy rate was 2.0% and the rental vacancy rate was 13.6%.

Racial composition as of the 2020 census
Race	Number	Percent
White	7,498	59.3%
Black or African American	530	4.2%
American Indian and Alaska Native	115	0.9%
Asian	40	0.3%
Native Hawaiian and Other Pacific Islander	2	0.0%
Some other race	2,274	18.0%
Two or more races	2,193	17.3%
Hispanic or Latino (of any race)	7,154	56.5%

=== 2000 census ===
As of the census of 2000, 12,866 people, 4,574 households, and 3,361 families resided in the city. The population density was 1,296.5 inhabitants per square mile (500.6/km^{2}). The 5,186 housing units averaged 522.6 per square mile (201.8/km^{2}). The racial makeup of the city was 70.34% White, 5.36% African American, 0.95% Native American, 0.18% Asian, 0.05% Pacific Islander, 20.92% from other races, and 2.21% from two or more races. Hispanics or Latinos of any race were 39.21% of the population.

Of the 4,574 households, 36.2% had children under the age of 18 living with them, 55.9% were married couples living together, 13.2% had a female householder with no husband present, and 26.5% were not families; 23.2% of all households were made up of individuals, and 11.6% had someone living alone who was 65 years of age or older. The average household size was 2.68 and the average family size was 3.17.

In the city, the population was distributed as 27.6% under the age of 18, 14.0% from 18 to 24, 24.6% from 25 to 44, 19.8% from 45 to 64, and 13.9% who were 65 years of age or older. The median age was 33 years. For every 100 females, there were 93.0 males. For every 100 females age 18 and over, there were 88.0 males.

The median income for a household in the city was $28,820, and for a family was $32,408. Males had a median income of $29,800 versus $20,042 for females. The per capita income for the city was $14,296. About 15.7% of families and 20.2% of the population were below the poverty line, including 25.8% of those under age 18 and 13.2% of those age 65 or over.

== Government ==
Levelland operates under a council-manager form of government. The Levelland City Council consists of the Mayor and four City Council members. The Mayor is elected at large for a three-year term, and council members are elected to represent residents in four election districts for two-year terms. The terms are staggered, resulting in the election of two council members each year. The Council appoints a City Manager responsible for the day-to-day administration, ensuring the provision of public services.

== Education ==
- The City of Levelland is served by the Levelland Independent School District.
- The Levelland High School mascot is the Lobo.
- Levelland is also home to South Plains College.

== Levelland in popular culture ==
The James McMurtry song "Levelland", recorded in 1995, is a song about life in the city, told from a slightly acerbic point of view. The song has also been recorded by Robert Earl Keen.

Held in the third week of July, Camp Bluegrass is a large social event, with public concerts, held on the South Plains College campus.

Levelland is home to the 12-year-old state champions in baseball, the Levelland Kekambas. This was the first team to ever win state from Levelland. The team ended up placing fifth at the regional tournament in Fort Smith, Arkansas.

== UFO allegations ==
Levelland is famous as the site of a well-publicized series of UFO sightings in November 1957. Several motorists driving on various highways around Levelland in the evening and early morning hours of November 2–3 claimed to see a large, egg-shaped object which emitted a blue glow and caused their automobiles to shut off. In most cases, the object was sitting either on the highway or close to it. When the object took off, witnesses claimed their vehicles would restart and work normally. Among witnesses were Weir Clem, Levelland's sheriff, and Ray Jones, the town's fire chief. The United States Air Force concluded a severe electrical storm (most probably ball lightning), was the major cause for the sightings and reported auto failures. However, several prominent UFO researchers, among them Dr. James E. McDonald, a physicist at the University of Arizona, and Dr. J. Allen Hynek, an astronomer at Northwestern University, disputed this explanation. Both men argued that no electrical storm was in the area when the sightings occurred.

== Levelland Municipal Airport (LLN) ==
- Airport elevation – 3514 ft above mean sea level
- Two active runways
  - 17/35 – 6,110 ft
  - 08/26 – 2,072 ft

== Notable people ==
- Beau Boulter, attorney, lobbyist, and former U.S. representative from Texas's 13th congressional district
- Frank Jackson, wide receiver with the Dallas Texans, the Kansas City Chiefs, and the Miami Dolphins 1961–1967, AFL All-Star 1965
- Ronny Jackson, physician to the President of the United States during the Obama and Trump administrations, unsuccessful nominee to head the United States Department of Veterans Affairs, later elected U.S. Representative for Texas's 13th congressional district
- Gene Mayfield (1928–2009), a successful high school and college football coach, concluded his career at Levelland High School
- Kinna McInroe, actress, known for her role as Nina in the film Office Space. She has guest-starred in episodes of several television series.
- David J. Schmidly (born 1943), an American scientist, professor and university president, was born in Levelland
- Marlene Willis, (January 13, 1942 - March 29, 1982), was an American singer, who performed on many televised variety shows during the 1950s, and later appeared as a guest star in several television series.

== See also ==
- Llano Estacado
- South Plains
- Yellow House Canyon
- XIT Ranch
- Blackwater Draw
