= Texas State Highway 179 =

State highway in Texas

State Highway 179
- SH 179, highlighted in red

Route information
- Maintained by TxDOT
- Length: 8.441 mi (13.584 km)
- Existed: 1932–present

Major junctions
- West end: US 84 Bus. in Teague
- I-45 in Dew
- East end: FM 489 in Dew

Location
- Country: United States
- State: Texas
- Counties: Freestone

Highway system
- Highways in Texas; Interstate; US; State; Former; Toll; Loops; Spurs; FM/RM; Park; Rec
← SH 178	→ SH 180

State Highway 179 (SH 179) is a short Texas state highway, traveling 8.441 miles (13.584 km) between Teague and Dew. The route was designated on October 26, 1932, along its current route.

== Route description ==
SH 179 begins in Teague at Business US 84. The route continues as Main Street through low-density residential development before meeting FM 553 at the latter's southern terminus. Leaving Teague, SH 179 travels eastward through a rural area until reaching Dew. Upon entering Dew, the highway meets I-45 at an interchange flanked by commercial development. SH 179 then passes by a school before reaching its eastern terminus at FM 489, which provides access to SH 75.

== History ==
SH 179 was designated on October 26, 1932, from Teague to SH 32 (now SH 75). The route has since been truncated slightly to FM 489.

== Junction list ==
The entire highway is in Freestone County.

Location	mi	km	Destinations	Notes
Teague	0.0	0.0	US 84 Bus. (Main Street)	
Teague	0.8	1.3	FM 553 north – Fairfield, Mexia	Southern terminus of FM 553
Dew	7.4– 7.6	11.9– 12.2	I-45 – Houston, Dallas	Exit 189 (I-45)
Dew	8.3	13.4	FM 489 to SH 75 – Buffalo, Freestone, Fairfield	
1.000 mi = 1.609 km; 1.000 km = 0.621 mi
