= Fairfield High School (Texas) =

Coordinates: 31.71776°N 96.14011°W

- 631 Post Oak Road; Fairfield, Texas 75840-2005; United States

Information
- School type: Public high school
- School district: Fairfield Independent School District
- Principal: Sonya Gibson
- Teaching staff: 43.54 (FTE)
- Grades: 9-12
- Enrollment: 523 (2023-2024)
- Student to teacher ratio: 12.01
- Colors: Maroon & Gold
- Athletics conference: UIL Class AAA
- Mascot: Eagle
- Yearbook: Eagle Eye
- Website: Fairfield High School

Fairfield High School is a public high school located in Fairfield, Texas (United States) and is part of the Fairfield Independent School District which serves students in central Freestone County and classified as a 3A school by the UIL. In 2019, the school was rated "exemplary performance" by the Texas Education Agency.

== Athletics ==
The Fairfield Eagles compete in these sports -

Volleyball, Cross Country, Football, Basketball, Powerlifting, Track, Baseball & Softball

=== State titles ===
Fairfield (UIL)

- Girls Track -
  - 1992 (3A), 1993 (3A)
- Girls' Basketball
  - 2020 (4A), 2022 (3A), 2025 (3A/D1)

==== State finalists ====
Fairfield (UIL)

- Football
  - 2013 (3A/D2)
- Girls' Basketball
  - 2021 (3A), 2023 (3A)

Fairfield Dogan (PVIL)

- Boys Basketball -
  - 1957(PVIL-1A), 1958(PVIL-1A), 1963(PVIL-2A)

== Notable alumni ==
- Tony Brackens, former NFL defensive end
- Louis Cheek, former NFL offensive lineman
- Brandon Hartson, former NFL long snapper
- Winfred Tubbs, former NFL linebacker
- Larry Rose III, former NFL running back
