= Teague, Texas =

- City
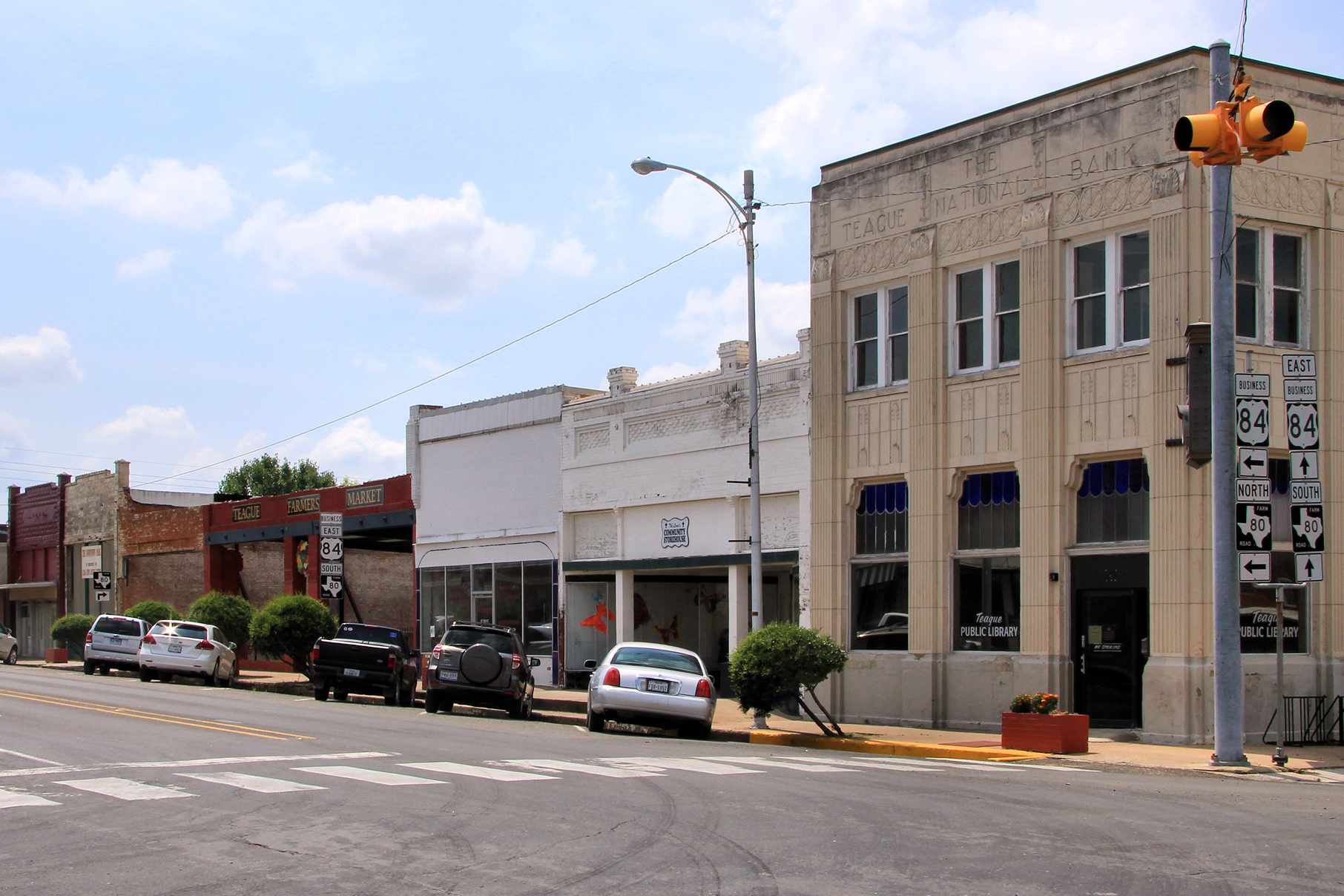
- Downtown Teague

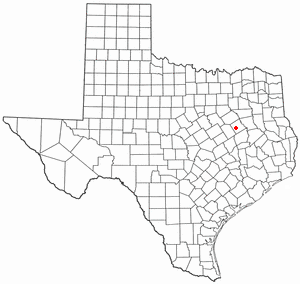
- Location of Teague, Texas

- Coordinates: 31°37′37″N 96°15′58″W
- Country: United States
- State: Texas
- County: Freestone

Government
  - Mayor: James Monks

Area
  - Total: 5.24 sq mi (13.58 km^{2})
  - Land: 5.05 sq mi (13.08 km^{2})
  - Water: 0.19 sq mi (0.50 km^{2})
- Elevation: 518 ft (158 m)

Population (2020)
  - Total: 3,384
  - Density: 696.0/sq mi (268.72/km^{2})
- Time zone: UTC-6 (Central (CST))
  - Summer (DST): UTC-5 (CDT)
- ZIP code: 75860
- Area code: 254
- FIPS code: 48-72020
- GNIS feature ID: 2412039
- Website: www.cityofteaguetx.com

Teague (pronounced "TIG") is a city in Freestone County, Texas, United States. The population was 3,384 at the 2020 census.

== Settlement ==
Teague, Texas, was initially settled around the time of the Civil War and developed significantly during the latter half of the 19th century. Originally known as Brewer, the community grew as a small settlement. In April 1886, a resident wrote that all they needed was a jeweler and shoemaker. The resident went on to inventory all the businesses they had, such as a good dry goods and grocery store, a blacksmith and wood shop, and a barber. Later in 1886, a gin was to open. The 1895 Rand McNally atlas shows Brewer with a post office and no express office or railroad. Also in 1895, Brewer Baptist Church ministered by A. B. Tedder had 109 members. The arrival of the Trinity and Brazos Valley Railway in 1906 was pivotal for Teague's development. The railway company established its machine and car shops in the town, which led to rapid growth and the town being renamed Teague. This renaming was done by the railway magnate Benjamin Franklin Yoakum in honor of his mother, Narcissa Teague, and her parents, who were early pioneers in Freestone County. Teague was incorporated as a municipality in 1906 and officially recognized as a city in 1907.

In its early years, Teague thrived as a significant railway hub and a shipping center for local cotton farmers. By 1914, the town had a diverse array of services and amenities, including multiple churches, public schools, waterworks, an electric light plant, an ice plant, banks, cotton gins, a cottonseed oil mill, a cotton compress, and several newspapers. The population reached approximately 3,300 by that time. However, the Great Depression and subsequent economic challenges led to a decline in the number of businesses and population. Despite these hardships, Teague's population saw steady growth from the mid-1980s onwards, with the community adapting and evolving through various economic shifts, including the rise of natural gas production as an important industry.

Teague also has a 3,300-foot-long airport; it is primarily used for recreational purposes.

=== Recent ===
In recent years, Teague has seen a variety of community events and developments that highlight its vibrant local culture and civic engagement. Recently, the town hosted numerous events, including holiday celebrations, fairs, and educational workshops. The Fourth of July festivities included a fireworks show and community picnics, while the annual Peach Festival in Fairfield featured music, food trucks, and a 5K run. The Teague Public Library has also been active, offering programs like arts and crafts classes, science days, and a real Mad Hatter Bubble Show.

On the civic front, Teague has continued to maintain its community-oriented focus through various public services and development projects. The city has seen active participation in local government elections, with positions such as mayor and aldermen being regularly contested. Additionally, the Teague Economic Development Corporation has been involved in promoting local business growth and infrastructure improvements.

== Geography ==
Teague is located in western Freestone County. U.S. Route 84 passes through the northern side of the city, leading northeast 10 miles (16 km) to Fairfield, the county seat, and northwest 13 miles (21 km) to Mexia. Texas State Highway 179 (Main Street) leads east 9 miles (14 km) to Dew.

According to the United States Census Bureau, the city of Teague has a total area of 5.3 square miles (13.6 km^{2}), of which 5.1 square miles (13.1 km^{2}) is land and 0.2 square miles (0.5 km^{2}), or 3.69%, is water.

== Demographics ==
Historical population
Census	Pop.	Note	%±
1910	3,288		—
1920	3,306		0.5%
1930	3,509		6.1%
1940	3,157		−10.0%
1950	2,925		−7.3%
1960	2,728		−6.7%
1970	2,867		5.1%
1980	3,390		18.2%
1990	3,268		−3.6%
2000	4,557		39.4%
2010	3,560		−21.9%
2020	3,384		−4.9%
U.S. Decennial Census

=== 2020 census ===
As of the 2020 census, Teague had a population of 3,384, 1,322 households, and 802 families residing in the city.

The median age was 38.3 years. 26.3% of residents were under the age of 18 and 18.1% of residents were 65 years of age or older. For every 100 females there were 88.0 males, and for every 100 females age 18 and over there were 85.2 males age 18 and over.

Of the 1,322 households in Teague, 33.1% had children under the age of 18 living in them. Of all households, 44.4% were married-couple households, 16.3% were households with a male householder and no spouse or partner present, and 34.9% were households with a female householder and no spouse or partner present. About 29.4% of all households were made up of individuals and 13.1% had someone living alone who was 65 years of age or older.

There were 1,537 housing units, of which 14.0% were vacant. The homeowner vacancy rate was 2.0% and the rental vacancy rate was 7.2%.

0.0% of residents lived in urban areas, while 100.0% lived in rural areas.

Racial composition as of the 2020 census
Race	Number	Percent
White	2,043	60.4%
Black or African American	569	16.8%
American Indian and Alaska Native	34	1.0%
Asian	5	0.1%
Native Hawaiian and Other Pacific Islander	9	0.3%
Some other race	447	13.2%
Two or more races	277	8.2%
Hispanic or Latino (of any race)	820	24.2%

=== 2000 census ===
As of the census of 2000, there were 4,557 people, 1,275 households, and 864 families residing in the city. The population density was 1,325.4 inhabitants per square mile (511.7/km^{2}). There were 1,526 housing units at an average density of 443.9 per square mile (171.4/km^{2}). The racial makeup of the city was 65.28% White, 27.67% African American, 0.13% Native American, 0.20% Asian, 0.07% Pacific Islander, 6.03% from other races, and 0.61% from two or more races. Hispanic or Latino of any race were 13.50% of the population.

There were 1,275 households, out of which 32.5% had children under the age of 18 living with them, 49.6% were married couples living together, 14.6% had a female householder with no husband present, and 32.2% were non-families. 29.8% of all households were made up of individuals, and 17.3% had someone living alone who was 65 years of age or older. The average household size was 2.51 and the average family size was 3.11.

In the city, the population was spread out, with 19.9% under the age of 18, 14.6% from 18 to 24, 36.9% from 25 to 44, 15.4% from 45 to 64, and 13.2% who were 65 years of age or older. The median age was 31 years. For every 100 females, there were 166.0 males. For every 100 females age 18 and over, there were 185.0 males.

The median income for a household in the city was $29,485, and the median income for a family was $36,842. Males had a median income of $24,884 versus $18,821 for females. The per capita income for the city was $14,326. About 10.0% of families and 16.3% of the population were below the poverty line, including 22.9% of those under age 18 and 14.5% of those age 65 or over.

== Education ==
The city, and surrounding areas, are served by the Teague Independent School District, providing education from pre-kindergarten through 12th grade. The district includes Teague Elementary School, Teague Junior High School, and Teague High School.

As of the 2021-2022 school year, it had 1,181 students. 48.8% of students were considered at risk of dropping out of school. 10% of students were enrolled in bilingual and English language learning programs.

The school received an accountability rating of A for the 2021-2022 school year.

In the Class of 2021, 97.3% of students received their high school diplomas on time or earlier. The dropout rate for students in grades 9-12 was 0.2% during the 2020-2021 school year.

The average ACT score was 20.8.

As of the 2021-2022 school year, an average teacher's salary was $53,708, which is $5,179 less than the state average. On average, teachers had 13.1 years of experience.
