= Wortham, Texas =

- Town
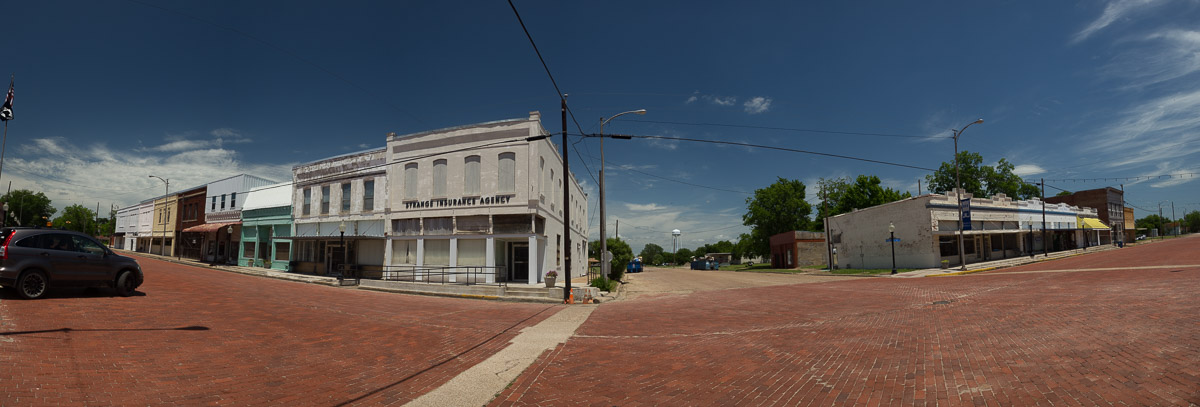
- Downtown Wortham, Texas

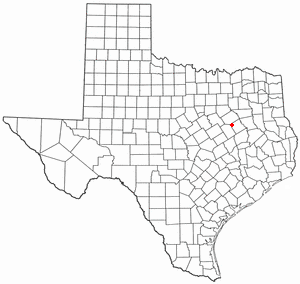
- Location of Wortham, Texas

- Coordinates: 31°47′23″N 96°27′40″W
- Country: United States
- State: Texas
- County: Freestone

Area
  - Total: 1.99 sq mi (5.15 km^{2})
  - Land: 1.99 sq mi (5.15 km^{2})
  - Water: 0 sq mi (0.00 km^{2})
- Elevation: 472 ft (144 m)

Population (2020)
  - Total: 980
  - Density: 501.2/sq mi (193.51/km^{2})
- Time zone: UTC-6 (Central (CST))
  - Summer (DST): UTC-5 (CDT)
- ZIP code: 76693
- Area code: 254
- FIPS code: 48-80296
- GNIS feature ID: 2413512
- Website: https://worthamtx.com/

Wortham is a town in Freestone County, Texas, United States. The population was 980 at the 2020 census.

== Geography ==
Wortham is located in the northwestern corner of Freestone County. Texas State Highway 14 runs through town as Third Street, leading north 10 miles (16 km) to Richland and Interstate 45, and south 8 miles (13 km) to Mexia. Fairfield, the Freestone County seat, is 18 miles (29 km) to the southeast.

According to the United States Census Bureau, the town has a total area of 2.0 square miles (5.1 km^{2}), all land. Wortham lies near the highest point between Dallas and Houston, the nearby Tehuacana Hills.

== Demographics ==
Historical population
Census	Pop.	Note	%±
1880	245		—
1890	401		63.7%
1910	899		—
1920	1,100		22.4%
1930	1,404		27.6%
1940	1,267		−9.8%
1950	1,170		−7.7%
1960	1,087		−7.1%
1970	1,036		−4.7%
1980	1,187		14.6%
1990	1,020		−14.1%
2000	1,082		6.1%
2010	1,073		−0.8%
2020	980		−8.7%
U.S. Decennial Census

Wortham racial composition as of 2020 (NH = Non-Hispanic) (Note: Note: the US Census treats Hispanic/Latino as an ethnic category. This table excludes Latinos from the racial categories and assigns them to a separate category. Hispanics/Latinos can be of any race.)
Race	Number	Percentage
White (NH)	655	66.84%
Black or African American (NH)	151	15.41%
Native American or Alaska Native (NH)	5	0.51%
Asian (NH)	2	0.2%
Pacific Islander (NH)	1	0.1%
Mixed/Multi-Racial (NH)	40	4.08%
Hispanic or Latino	126	12.86%
Total	980	

As of the 2020 United States census, there were 980 people, 429 households, and 252 families residing in the town.

As of the census of 2000, there were 1,082 people, 428 households, and 278 families residing in the town. The population density was 545.9 inhabitants per square mile (210.8/km^{2}). There were 479 housing units at an average density of 241.7 per square mile (93.3/km^{2}). The racial makeup of the town was 79.94% White, 17.84% African American, 0.65% Native American, 1.20% from other races, and 0.37% from two or more races. Hispanic or Latino of any race were 2.77% of the population.

There were 428 households, out of which 35.0% had children under the age of 18 living with them, 46.3% were married couples living together, 15.7% had a female householder with no husband present, and 35.0% were non-families. 32.0% of all households were made up of individuals, and 17.5% had someone living alone who was 65 years of age or older. The average household size was 2.45 and the average family size was 3.12.

In the town, the population was spread out, with 28.4% under the age of 18, 7.1% from 18 to 24, 25.8% from 25 to 44, 20.4% from 45 to 64, and 18.3% who were 65 years of age or older. The median age was 36 years. For every 100 females, there were 80.6 males. For every 100 females age 18 and over, there were 72.2 males.

The median income for a household in the town was $23,988, and the median income for a family was $35,625. Males had a median income of $26,094 versus $18,098 for females. The per capita income for the town was $14,269. About 14.7% of families and 18.1% of the population were below the poverty line, including 22.1% of those under age 18 and 17.1% of those age 65 or over.

== Education ==
The town is served by the Wortham Independent School District and is home to the Wortham High School Bulldogs.

== Notable people ==
- Charlie Davis, NFL defensive tackle for the St. Louis Cardinals
- Leonard Davis, a guard/offensive tackle for the Dallas Cowboys, Arizona Cardinals and Detroit Lions
- Blind Lemon Jefferson, an influential blues musician, born and buried in Wortham
