= Freestone County, Texas =

County in Texas, United States

- County
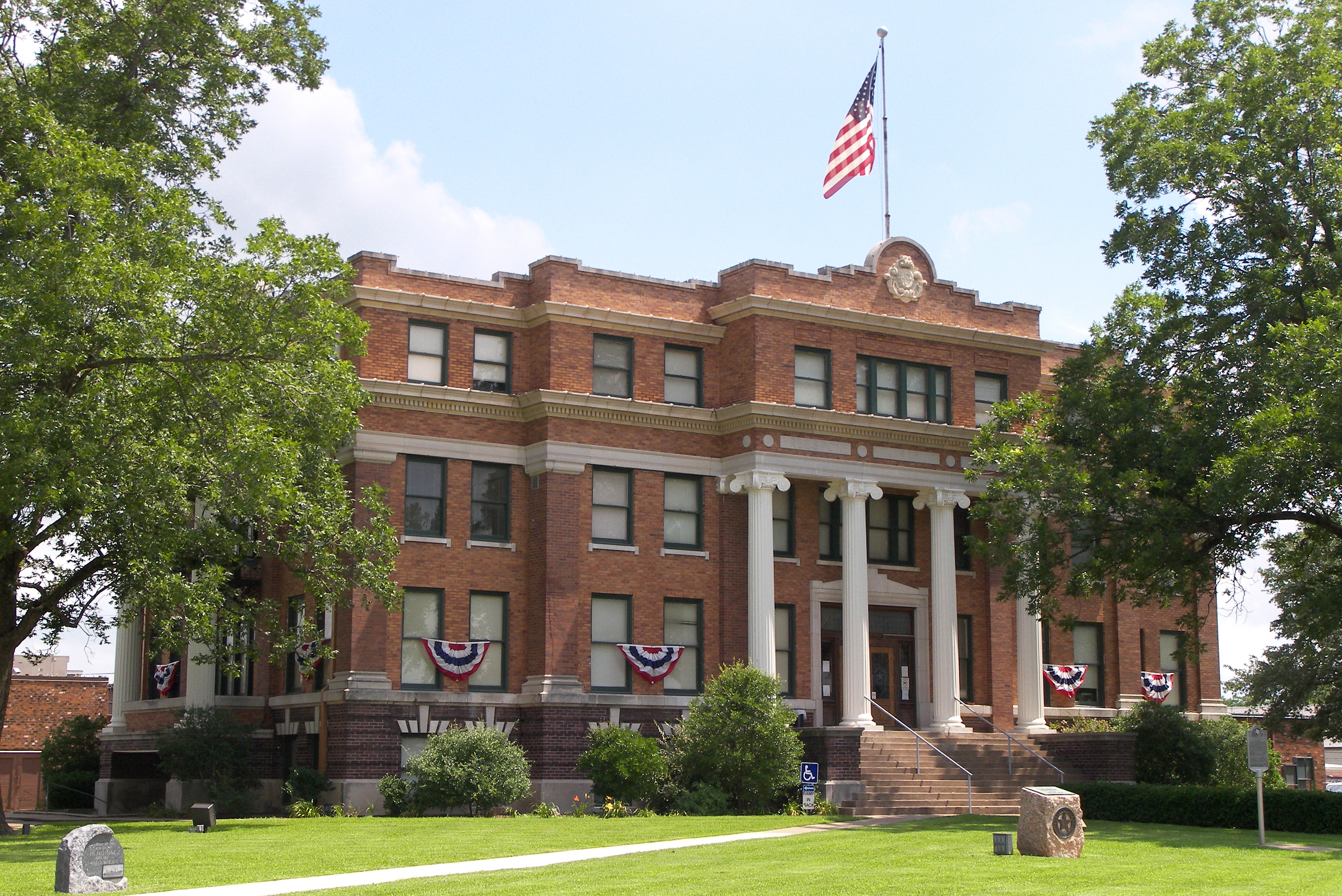
- The Freestone County Courthouse in Fairfield

- Location within the U.S. state of Texas
- Coordinates: 31°42′N 96°09′W
- Country: United States
- State: Texas
- Founded: 1851; 175 years ago
- Seat: Fairfield
- Largest city: Teague

Area
  - Total: 892 sq mi (2,310 km^{2})
  - Land: 878 sq mi (2,270 km^{2})
  - Water: 14 sq mi (36 km^{2}) 1.6%

Population (2020)
  - Total: 19,435
  - Estimate (2025): 20,811 ▲
  - Density: 22.1/sq mi (8.55/km^{2})
- Time zone: UTC−6 (Central)
  - Summer (DST): UTC−5 (CDT)
- Congressional districts: 6th, 17th
- Website: www.co.freestone.tx.us

Freestone County is a county in the east-central part of the U.S. state of Texas. As of the 2020 census, its population was 19,435. Its county seat is Fairfield. The county was created in 1850 and organized the next year.

== History ==
=== Native Americans ===
Archeological evidence of the farming Kichai band of the Caddoan Mississippian culture dates to 200 BC in the area.

The Hernando de Soto expedition of 1541 resulted in violent encounters with the Caddo Native Americans who occupied the area. Spanish and French missionaries carried smallpox, measles, malaria, and influenza as endemic diseases; the Caddo suffered epidemics, as they had no acquired immunity to these new diseases. Eventually, the Caddo were forced to reservations.

=== County established ===
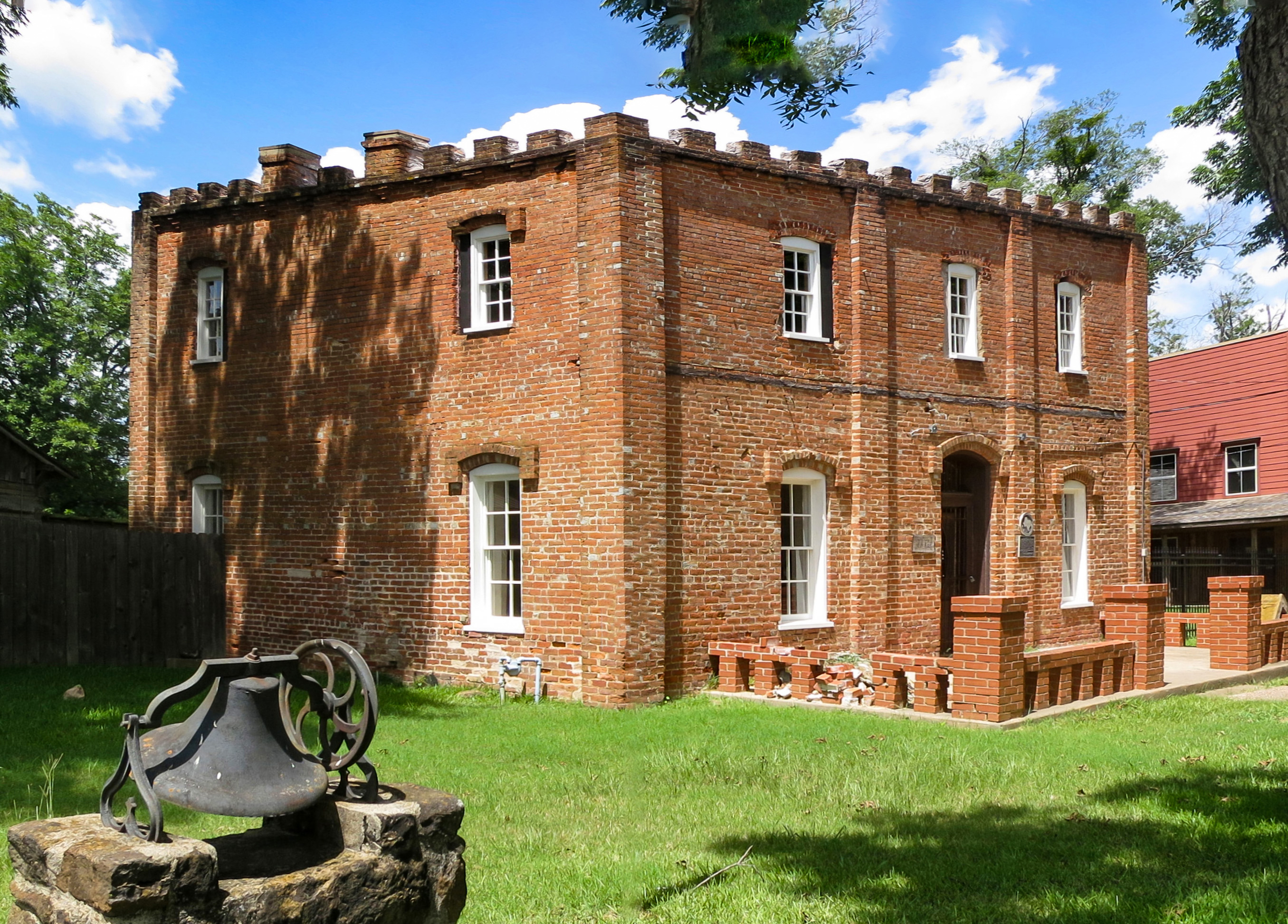
Old Freestone County Jail, Fairfield, Texas

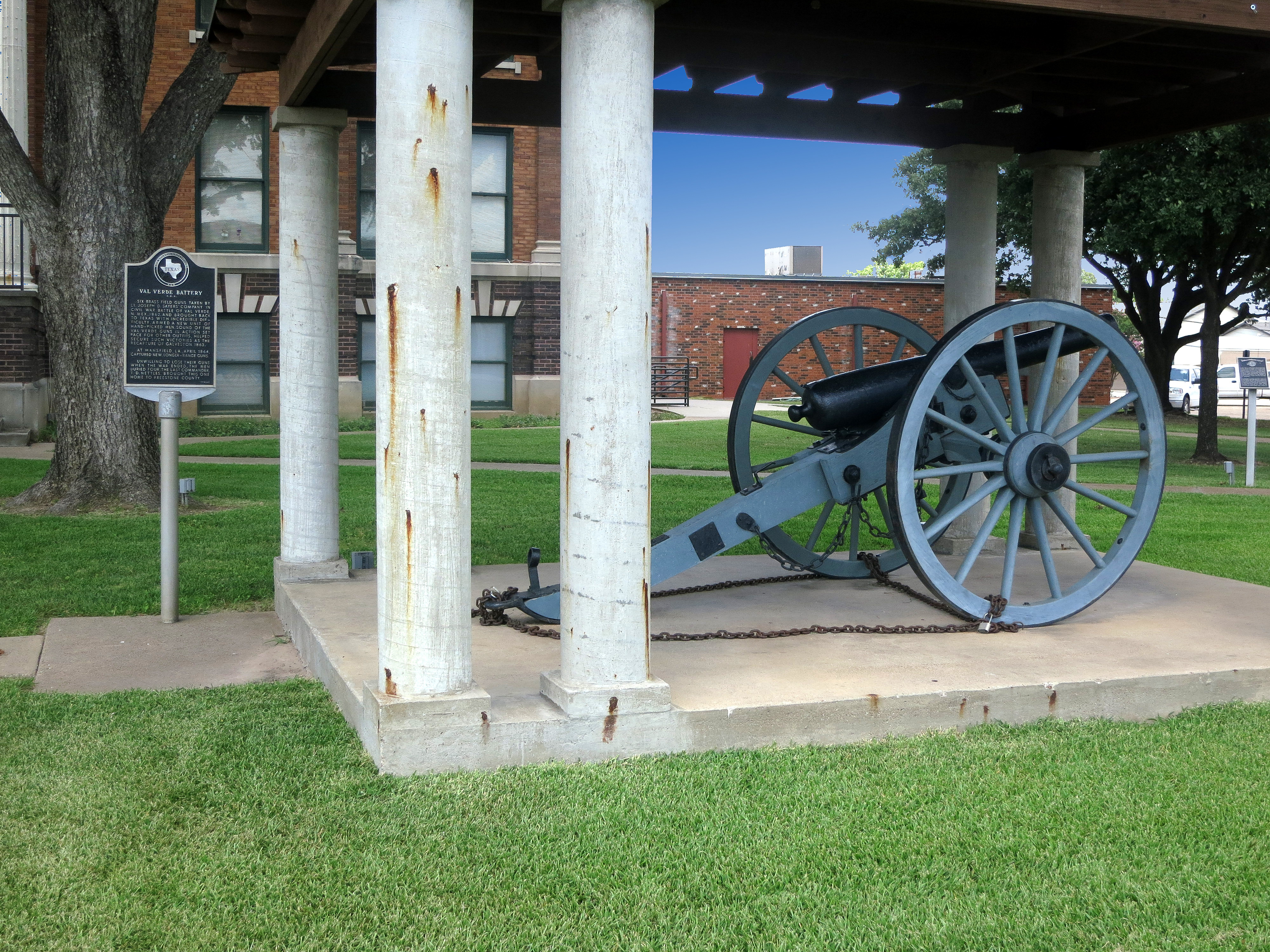
This cannon was taken at the Civil War battle of Val Verde. It is on the courthouse grounds

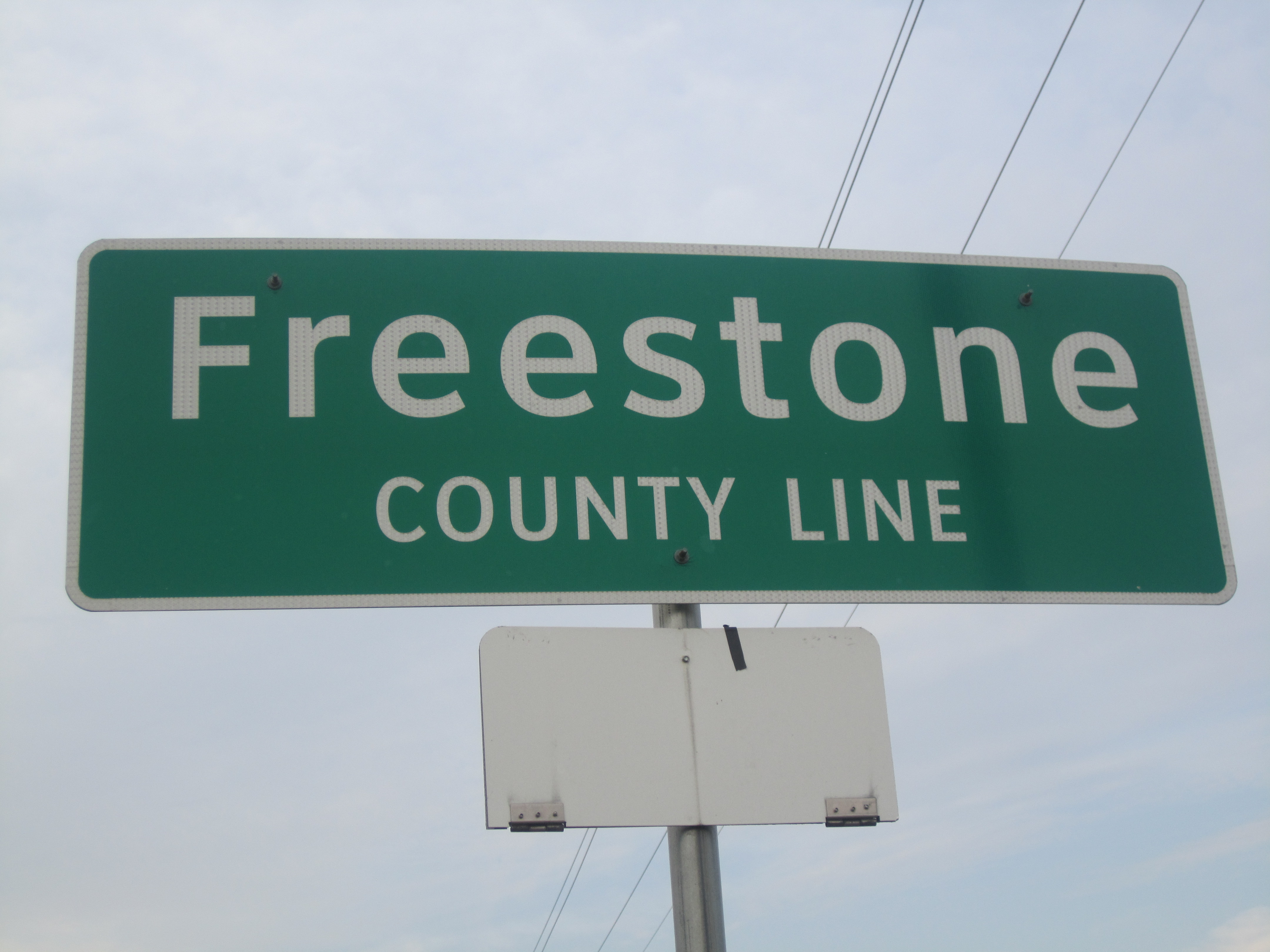

In 1826, empresario David G. Burnet received a grant from the Coahuila y Tejas legislature to settle 300 families. By contracting how many families each grantee could settle, the government sought to have some control over colonization.

The threat of Indian hostilities kept most from homesteading in Freestone County until the Treaty of Bird's Fort. Within three years of the treaty, colonization, primarily from Southern states, had been so successful that the counties surrounding Freestone had already been organized. In 1850, the Texas Legislature formed Freestone County from Limestone County. Freestone is a descriptive name referring to the quality of the soil. The county was organized in 1851. Fairfield was designated as the county seat. Of the county's total 1860 population of 6,881, more than half (3,613) were slaves.

Freestone County voted 585–3 in favor of secession from the Union. After the Civil War, while the loss of slave labor may have hurt the planters in the local county economy, by the end of Reconstruction, the number of farms doubled, with more smaller farms than before the war. Continuing economic and social tensions after Reconstruction resulted in Whites lynching Blacks to keep them in place as second-class citizens. Freestone County had nine such lynchings from 1877 into the early 20th century, most around the turn of the century. This was the fifth-highest total in the state, tied with that of Grimes County, Texas.

The Houston and Texas Central Railway was constructed to skirt the county to the west and south in 1870, giving the local economy a boost. and the International – Great Northern Railroad The Trinity and Brazos Valley Railway, laid track across the county in 1906, helping the growing economy.

The Prohibition Eighteenth Amendment to the United States Constitution took effect in 1920, banning the sale, manufacturing, and transportation of alcoholic beverages for public consumption. In the period until its repeal by the Twenty-first Amendment to the United States Constitution in 1933, some enterprising individuals in Freestone followed a national trend and began bootlegging for profit. This illegal activity put food on the table for some people during a period when the local economy was in a downward slide.

In 1969, the Texas Utilities Generating Company located a new power plant near Fairfield called Big Brown Power Plant. A dam was built to create Fairfield Lake to provide stored water for a cooling system for the plant. Fairfield Lake State Park was established around the lake and opened to the public in 1976. Big Brown was shut down in February 2018.

== Geography ==
According to the U.S. Census Bureau, the county has a total area of 892 sq mi (2,310 km^{2}), of which 878 sq mi (2,270 km^{2}) are land and 14 sq mi (36 km^{2}) (1.6%) are covered by water.

=== Major highways ===
- I-45
- US 79
- US 84
- US 287
- SH 14
- SH 75
- SH 164
- SH 179
- Loop 262
- Spur 113
- Spur 114

=== Adjacent counties ===
- Henderson County (north)
- Anderson County (northeast)
- Leon County (southeast)
- Limestone County (southwest)
- Navarro County (northwest)

== Demographics ==
Historical population
Census	Pop.	Note	%±
1860	6,881		—
1870	8,139		18.3%
1880	14,921		83.3%
1890	15,987		7.1%
1900	18,910		18.3%
1910	20,557		8.7%
1920	23,264		13.2%
1930	22,589		−2.9%
1940	21,138		−6.4%
1950	15,696		−25.7%
1960	12,525		−20.2%
1970	11,116		−11.2%
1980	14,830		33.4%
1990	15,818		6.7%
2000	17,867		13.0%
2010	19,816		10.9%
2020	19,435		−1.9%
2025 (est.)	20,811	▲	7.1%
U.S. Decennial Census; 1850–2010 2010 2020

=== Racial and ethnic composition ===
Freestone County, Texas – Racial and ethnic composition Note: the US Census treats Hispanic/Latino as an ethnic category. This table excludes Latinos from the racial categories and assigns them to a separate category. Hispanics/Latinos may be of any race.
Race / Ethnicity (NH = Non-Hispanic)	Pop 1980	Pop 1990	Pop 2000	Pop 2010	Pop 2020	% 1980	% 1990	% 2000	% 2010	% 2020
White alone (NH)	11,286	12,124	12,823	13,656	12,817	76.10%	76.65%	71.77%	68.91%	65.95%
Black or African American alone (NH)	3,187	2,999	3,359	3,164	2,740	21.49%	18.96%	18.80%	15.97%	14.10%
Native American or Alaska Native alone (NH)	22	43	48	77	64	0.15%	0.27%	0.27%	0.39%	0.33%
Asian alone (NH)	34	32	44	50	66	0.23%	0.20%	0.25%	0.25%	0.34%
Native Hawaiian or Pacific Islander alone (NH)	x	x	3	5	11	x	x	0.02%	0.03%	0.06%
Other race alone (NH)	0	1	12	8	46	0.00%	0.01%	0.07%	0.04%	0.24%
Mixed race or Multiracial (NH)	x	x	113	162	536	x	x	0.63%	0.82%	2.76%
Hispanic or Latino (any race)	301	619	1,465	2,694	3,155	2.03%	3.91%	8.20%	13.60%	16.23%
Total	14,830	15,818	17,867	19,816	19,435	100.00%	100.00%	100.00%	100.00%	100.00%

=== 2020 census ===
As of the 2020 census, the county had a population of 19,435. The median age was 44.0 years. 21.3% of residents were under the age of 18 and 20.9% of residents were 65 years of age or older.

For every 100 females there were 109.3 males, and for every 100 females age 18 and over there were 110.9 males age 18 and over.

The racial makeup of the county was 68.6% White, 14.2% Black or African American, 0.8% American Indian and Alaska Native, 0.4% Asian, 0.1% Native Hawaiian and Pacific Islander, 9.8% from some other race, and 6.2% from two or more races. Hispanic or Latino residents of any race comprised 16.2% of the population.

<0.1% of residents lived in urban areas, while 100.0% lived in rural areas.

There were 7,256 households in the county, of which 29.6% had children under the age of 18 living in them. Of all households, 52.2% were married-couple households, 17.0% were households with a male householder and no spouse or partner present, and 26.7% were households with a female householder and no spouse or partner present. About 27.3% of all households were made up of individuals and 14.1% had someone living alone who was 65 years of age or older.

There were 9,030 housing units, of which 19.6% were vacant. Among occupied housing units, 77.2% were owner-occupied and 22.8% were renter-occupied. The homeowner vacancy rate was 2.1% and the rental vacancy rate was 9.4%.

=== 2010 census ===
As of the 2010 census, 19,816 people, 6,588 households, and 4,664 families were residing in the county. The population density was 20 people/mi^{2} (7.7 people/km^{2}). The 8,138 housing units averaged 9 per square mile (3.5/km^{2}).

The racial makeup of the county was 73.1% White, 16.1% African American, 0.7% Native American, 0.3% Asian, 8.1% from other races, and 1.6% from two or more races. About 13.6% of the population were Hispanic or Latino of any race.

Of the 7,259 households, 28% had children under 18 living with them, 54.5% were married couples living together, 10.5% had a female householder with no husband present, and 30.6% were not families. About 27% of all households were made up of individuals, and 12.4% had someone living alone who was 65 or older. The average household size was 2.51, and the average family size was 3.05.

In the county, the age distribution was 23.6% under 18, 8.9% from 18 to 24, 28.1% from 25 to 44, 23.0% from 45 to 64, and 16.4% who were 65 or older. The median age was 38 years. For every 100 females there were 110.50 males. For every 100 females age 18 and over, there were 110.80 males.

The median income for a household in the county was $44,560, and for a family was $59,696. Males had a median income of $30,633 versus $19,214 for females. The per capita income for the county was $16,338. About 9.80% of families and 14.20% of the population were below the poverty line, including 16.80% of those under age 18 and 14.30% of those age 65 or over.

== Media ==
Freestone County is currently listed as part of the Dallas-Fort Worth DMA, although it is located in eastern Central Texas, geographically closer to the Waco metropolitan area. Local media outlets include: KDFW-TV, KXAS-TV, WFAA-TV, KTVT-TV, KERA-TV, KTXA-TV, KDFI-TV, KDAF-TV, and KFWD-TV, and all of the Waco/Temple/Killeen market stations also provide coverage for Freestone County. They include: KCEN-TV, KWTX-TV, KXXV-TV, KAKW-TV and KWKT-TV.

The Freestone County Times and The Freestone County Recorder-Chronicle newspapers serve the county.

== Communities ==
=== Cities ===
- Fairfield (county seat)
- Teague

=== Towns ===
- Kirvin
- Oakwood (mostly in Leon County)
- Streetman (small part in Navarro County)
- Wortham

=== Unincorporated communities ===
- Butler
- Dew
- Donie
- Freestone

=== Ghost town ===
- Coutchman

== Notable people ==
- Leonard Davis (born 1978), NFL offensive lineman for the Dallas Cowboys, grew up in Wortham.
- Blind Lemon Jefferson (1893–1929), blues musician, was born near Wortham.
- Firpo Marberry, Major League Baseball pitcher from Streetman, Texas.
- Washington Phillips (1880–1954), gospel blues musician, was born in the county.
- George Watkins (1900–70), Major League Baseball player who owns the record for highest batting average as a rookie, was born in the county.

== Politics ==
United States presidential election results for Freestone County, Texas
Year	Republican		Democratic		Third party(ies)	
Year	No.	%	No.	%	No.	%
1912	475	26.24%	1,305	72.10%	30	1.66%
1916	637	27.56%	1,575	68.15%	99	4.28%
1920	378	13.74%	1,463	53.16%	911	33.10%
1924	608	19.17%	2,484	78.31%	80	2.52%
1928	1,178	47.14%	1,318	52.74%	3	0.12%
1932	170	6.40%	2,481	93.41%	5	0.19%
1936	134	6.48%	1,929	93.23%	6	0.29%
1940	481	12.03%	3,514	87.85%	5	0.13%
1944	277	9.17%	2,427	80.31%	318	10.52%
1948	460	14.24%	2,265	70.12%	505	15.63%
1952	1,707	37.02%	2,902	62.94%	2	0.04%
1956	1,627	47.09%	1,813	52.47%	15	0.43%
1960	1,629	44.63%	1,997	54.71%	24	0.66%
1964	1,074	27.60%	2,816	72.35%	2	0.05%
1968	958	23.41%	2,066	50.48%	1,069	26.12%
1972	2,459	65.61%	1,283	34.23%	6	0.16%
1976	1,674	38.39%	2,679	61.43%	8	0.18%
1980	2,468	46.88%	2,739	52.02%	58	1.10%
1984	3,624	59.20%	2,489	40.66%	9	0.15%
1988	3,159	51.85%	2,916	47.87%	17	0.28%
1992	2,316	36.39%	2,445	38.41%	1,604	25.20%
1996	2,888	47.37%	2,630	43.14%	579	9.50%
2000	4,247	63.95%	2,316	34.87%	78	1.17%
2004	5,057	70.62%	2,070	28.91%	34	0.47%
2008	5,205	71.42%	2,034	27.91%	49	0.67%
2012	5,646	74.58%	1,850	24.44%	74	0.98%
2016	6,026	78.42%	1,471	19.14%	187	2.43%
2020	6,991	80.18%	1,635	18.75%	93	1.07%
2024	7,500	82.92%	1,499	16.57%	46	0.51%

United States Senate election results for Freestone County, Texas1
Year	Republican		Democratic		Third party(ies)	
Year	No.	%	No.	%	No.	%
2024	7,197	80.35%	1,601	17.87%	159	1.78%

United States Senate election results for Freestone County, Texas2
Year	Republican		Democratic		Third party(ies)	
Year	No.	%	No.	%	No.	%
2020	6,838	79.91%	1,553	18.15%	166	1.94%

Texas Gubernatorial election results for Freestone County
Year	Republican		Democratic		Third party(ies)	
Year	No.	%	No.	%	No.	%
2022	5,600	84.07%	991	14.88%	70	1.05%

== Education ==
School districts include:

- Buffalo Independent School District
- Corsicana Independent School District
- Dew Independent School District
- Fairfield Independent School District
- Mexia Independent School District
- Oakwood Independent School District
- Teague Independent School District
- Wortham Independent School District

The entire county is in the service area of Navarro College, according to the Texas Education Code.

== See also ==
- National Register of Historic Places listings in Freestone County, Texas
- Recorded Texas Historic Landmarks in Freestone County
