= Streetman, Texas =

Town in Freestone and Navarro counties in Texas, United States

- Town
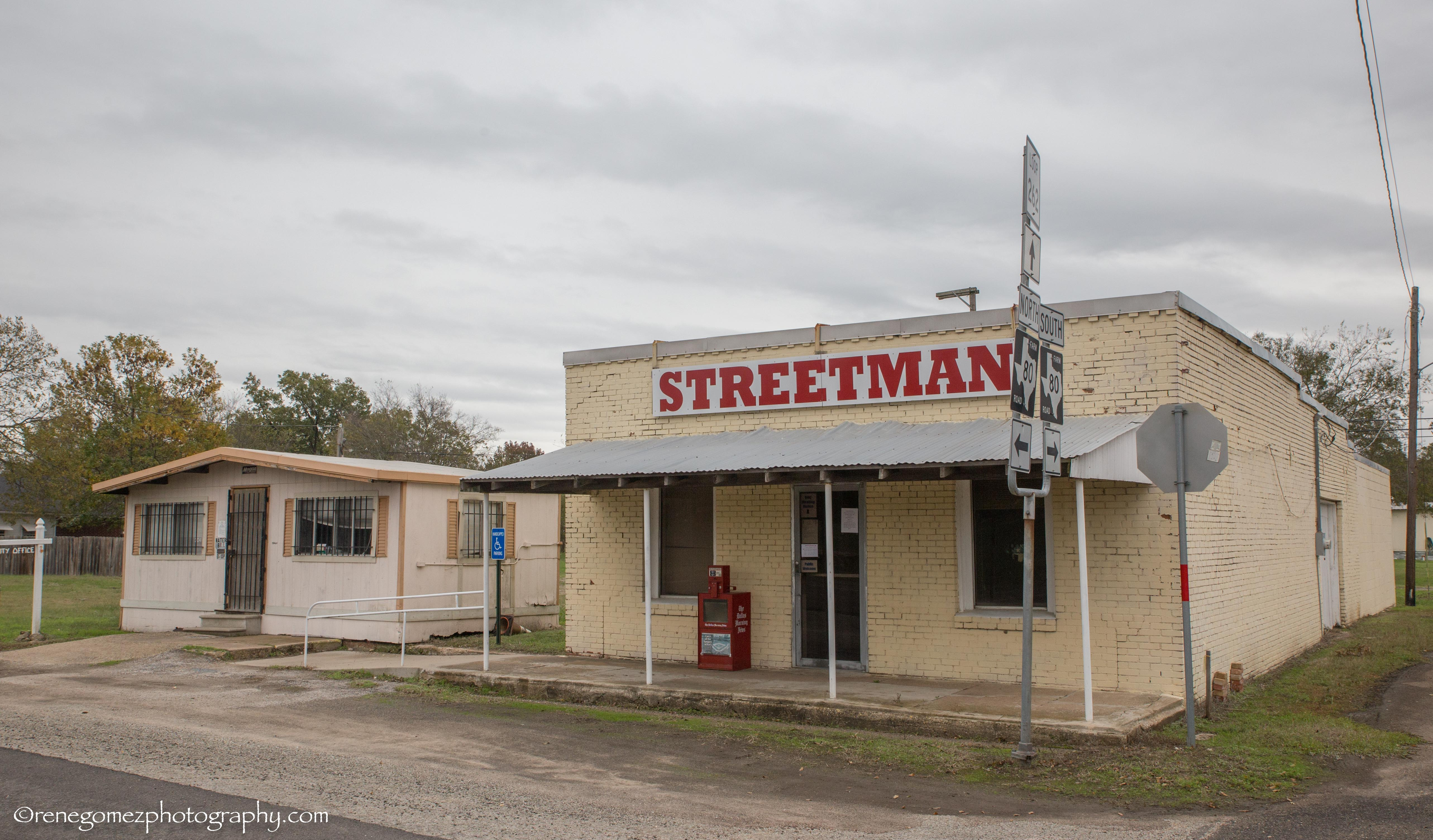

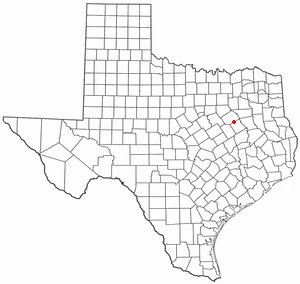
- Location of Streetman, Texas

- Coordinates: 31°52′44″N 96°19′48″W
- Country: United States
- State: Texas
- Counties: Freestone, Navarro

Area
  - Total: 1.41 sq mi (3.64 km^{2})
  - Land: 1.40 sq mi (3.63 km^{2})
  - Water: 0.0039 sq mi (0.01 km^{2})
- Elevation: 374 ft (114 m)

Population (2020)
  - Total: 248
  - Density: 176.8/sq mi (68.25/km^{2})
- Time zone: UTC-6 (Central (CST))
  - Summer (DST): UTC-5 (CDT)
- ZIP code: 75859
- Area codes: 903, 430
- FIPS code: 48-70604
- GNIS feature ID: 2413342

Streetman is a town in Freestone and Navarro counties in Texas, United States. As of the 2020 census the population was 248.

== Geography ==
Streetman is located in northern Freestone County. A largely undeveloped part of the town extends north into Navarro County.

Streetman is on Texas State Highway 75, which leads southeast 14 miles (23 km) to Fairfield, the Freestone County seat. Interstate 45 passes southwest of Streetman, with access from Exits 211 and 213. I-45 leads north 74 miles (119 km) to Dallas and south 165 miles (266 km) to Houston.

According to the United States Census Bureau, the town has a total area of 1.41 square miles (3.64 km^{2}), of which 0.0039 square miles (0.01 km^{2}), or 0.2%, is water.

== Demographics ==
Historical population
Census	Pop.	Note	%±
1920	478		—
1930	509		6.5%
1940	392		−23.0%
1950	419		6.9%
1960	300		−28.4%
1970	286		−4.7%
1980	415		45.1%
1990	260		−37.3%
2000	203		−21.9%
2010	247		21.7%
2020	248		0.4%
U.S. Decennial Census

As of the census of 2000, there were 203 people, 102 households, and 55 families residing in the town. The population density was 421.6 inhabitants per square mile (162.8/km^{2}). There were 128 housing units at an average density of 265.8 per square mile (102.6/km^{2}). The racial makeup of the town was 83.74% White, 14.78% African American, 0.99% from other races, and 0.49% from two or more races. Hispanic or Latino of any race were 4.43% of the population.

There were 102 households, out of which 17.6% had children under the age of 18 living with them, 42.2% were married couples living together, 8.8% had a female householder with no husband present, and 45.1% were non-families. 40.2% of all households were made up of individuals, and 22.5% had someone living alone who was 65 years of age or older. The average household size was 1.99 and the average family size was 2.59.

In the town, the population was spread out, with 15.8% under the age of 18, 5.4% from 18 to 24, 26.1% from 25 to 44, 27.1% from 45 to 64, and 25.6% who were 65 years of age or older. The median age was 47 years. For every 100 females, there were 93.3 males. For every 100 females age 18 and over, there were 85.9 males.

The median income for a household in the town was $19,531, and the median income for a family was $33,750. Males had a median income of $31,667 versus $20,313 for females. The per capita income for the town was $13,599. About 5.0% of families and 9.7% of the population were below the poverty line, including none of those under the age of eighteen and 19.6% of those 65 or over.

== Education ==
Streetman is served by the Fairfield Independent School District.

== Notable people ==
- Arbella Ewing (1894–2008), who was at the time of her death the third-oldest living person, the second-oldest living American, the second longest-lived resident of Texas, and the oldest living African-American.
- Firpo Marberry, famous Major League Baseball pitcher in the 1920s and 1930s, pitched in the 1924, 1925 and 1934 World Series.
- Blind Lemon Jefferson, famous blues musician, lived with his sharecropper family near Streetman for several years around 1900.

== See also ==
- List of municipalities in Texas
