= National Register of Historic Places listings in Freestone County, Texas =

Location of Freestone County in Texas

This is a list of the National Register of Historic Places listings in Freestone County, Texas.

This is intended to be a complete list of properties listed on the National Register of Historic Places in Freestone County, Texas. There is one property listed on the National Register in the county. This property is also a State Antiquities Landmark.

This National Park Service list is complete through NPS recent listings posted March 21, 2025.

== Current listings ==
The locations of National Register properties may be seen in a mapping service provided.

	Name on the Register	Image	Date listed	Location	City or town	Description
1	Trinity and Brazos Valley Railroad Depot and Office Building	Trinity and Brazos Valley Railroad Depot and Office Building	March 21, 1979 (#79002940)	208 S. 3rd Ave. 31°37′33″N 96°17′07″W	Teague	State Antiquities Landmark

== See also ==
- National Register of Historic Places listings in Texas
- Recorded Texas Historic Landmarks in Freestone County
