= Wortham High School (Texas) =

Coordinates: 31.71776°N 96.14011°W

- 200 S 5th St. Wortham, Texas 76693-0247

Information
- School type: Public high school
- School district: Wortham Independent School District
- Principal: David Hayes
- Staff: 17.59 (FTE)
- Grades: 9-12
- Enrollment: 164 (2023–2024)
- Student to teacher ratio: 9.32
- Colors: Royal Blue & White
- Athletics conference: UIL Class 2A
- Mascot: Bulldog
- Website: Wortham High School

Wortham High School is a public high school located in Wortham, Texas (USA) and is classified as a 2A school by the UIL. It is part of the Wortham Independent School District which serves students in far western Freestone County. In 2015, the school was rated "Met Standard" by the Texas Education Agency.

== Athletics ==
The Wortham Bulldogs compete in these sports -

Cross Country, Volleyball, Football, Basketball, Powerlifting, Track, Tennis, Golf, Softball & Baseball

=== State titles ===
- Boys Basketball -
  - 1997(1A)
- Boys Track -
  - 1978(B)

== Notable alumni ==
- Charlie Davis - former National Football League (NFL) player
- Leonard Davis - former NFL player
