= Dew Independent School District =

School district in Texas

Dew Independent School District is a public school district based in the community of Dew, Texas (USA).

Located in southern Freestone County, the district has one school that serves students in Pre-Kindergarten (Pre-K) through eighth grade.

In 2009, the school district was rated "recognized" by the Texas Education Agency.
