= Charlie Davis (defensive tackle) =

American football player (born 1951)

Charles Davis
No. 77, 76, 79
- Position: Defensive tackle

Personal information
- Born: November 17, 1951 (age 74); Wortham, Texas, U.S.
- Listed height: 6 ft 1 in (1.85 m)
- Listed weight: 269 lb (122 kg)

Career information
- High school: Wortham
- College: TCU
- NFL draft: 1974: 9th round, 229th overall pick

Career history
- Pittsburgh Steelers (1974); St. Louis Cardinals (1975–1979); Houston Oilers (1980)

Awards and highlights
- Super Bowl champion (IX); Third-team All-American (1972); 2× First-team All-SWC (1972, 1973)

Career NFL statistics
- Sacks: 10.5
- Fumble recoveries: 4
- Defensive TDs: 1
- Stats at Pro Football Reference

Charlie Davis (born November 17, 1951) is an American former professional football player who was a defensive tackle in the National Football League (NFL). He played college football for the TCU Horned Frogs and was selected 229th overall by the Pittsburgh Steelers in the ninth round of the 1974 NFL draft. He played for seven seasons in the NFL. He was a back-up defensive tackle for the Steelers and a member of their first World Championship Super Bowl IX over the Minnesota Vikings, was traded to the St. Louis Cardinals Sep 15 1975, for whom he played from (1975–1979), and the Houston Oilers (1980). Charlie played the best game of his career in the 1975 NFC Divisional Playoffs against the LA Rams when he recorded 5 sacks and recovered a fumble.

His younger half-brother is former Dallas Cowboys' offensive guard Leonard Davis.
