= Wortham Independent School District =

School district in Texas

Wortham Independent School District is a public school district based in Wortham, Texas (USA).

In addition to Wortham, the district serves students in the town of Kirvin and rural areas of western Freestone County. The district extends into southern Navarro County and a small portion of northern Limestone County.

In 2009, the school district was rated "academically acceptable" by the Texas Education Agency.

== Campuses ==
Wortham ISD has three campuses:

- Wortham High School (grades 9–12)
- Wortham Middle School (grades 6–8)
- Wortham Elementary School (grades PK-5).

== School history ==
=== Founding and early years ===
The town of Wortham, first known as Longbotham, was established by a Mexican Colonization land grant on July 24, 1835. (History of Freestone County Texas. By Freestone County Historical Commission, Volume 1, p. 209)

The Methodist and Masonic lodge built a two-story frame building that served the community for church services and Masonic meetings. It was believed by this organization that both boys and girls should be educated. As early as 1870, the Masons opened their building and established the first private school in Wortham. There is no record, but several people have reported that this building was located in the vicinity of 5th Street and Longbotham. The Masons maintained the school and provided textbooks and supplies. Ministers were used as teachers.

The first public school in Wortham was organized in 1883 in a boxed building 25 by 30 feet in size, located where the middle school now stands. (Ibid. p. 209) Thomas Longbotham, Jack Berry, and Dick Knight were the trustees. The first teachers were Professor Miller and Mrs. Thyrsia Barrison who later became Mrs. George Bounds. The ABC's, McGuffey's Reader, Davie's Arithmetic, the Blue Back Speller and writing were taught to pupils of all ages, who were in classed according to their reading abilities. In this two-teacher school, the boys sat on one side of the room and the girls sat on the other. It was also noted that the recesses were arranged for the boys to play on one side of the yard and the girls to play on the other side.

A former student Mr. Weaver recalled his professor at the time being Professor Miller. Professor Miller was a strong disciplinarian who believed in whipping his pupils. It was because of this discipline that a second school was established. Several of the pioneer families organized, built a one-room building, purchased supplies, hired Miss Sallie Booth from Sam Houston State Teachers College for thirty dollars a month and sent their children to this private school. (Ibid. p. 210). Approximately thirty students, mostly girls, of all ages attended this school because the parents didn't want their children whipped. This private school is believed to have been located on the east side of the railroad track, which lasted for only five years.

Professor William Kirvin followed Professor Miller in 1885 and served as principal until 1890. Under the supervision of Professor Kirvin in 1891, Wortham formed the first independent school district in Freestone County. (Ibid. p. 210)

The first college graduate to teach in Wortham was Professor L. F. Cooper, who came to the school in 1890. He added Latin, algebra and geometry to the curriculum. In 1890, the school building was replaced by a two-story frame building, which stood where the present kindergarten and first grade building is located. Fire destroyed this building in 1902, and a two-story brick building was erected on the same location. A bell tower was built on top of the building to ring in the start of each new day.

In 1904–1905, there was an enrollment of 339 children. The tax rate was fifty cents per $100, and the school property was valued at $10,825.

A gradual increase in scholastics was noted from 1905 to 1911, and by 1913 Wortham was the first school in Freestone County to be granted affiliation with the State University.

By 1918, C. V. Reed was superintendent of the school, which employed eight teachers. The school district, with an enrollment of 385 children in eleven grades, offered four years of accredited high school work.

By 1922, the student body had outgrown the two story brick building. A new high school building was erected south of the old building. Trustees at this time were T. B. Poindexter, President; W. J Bryant, Secretary; Henry Meador, Will Calame, J. F. Wallis, John P. Stubbs and T. O. Sims. The new three story brick building costing $50,000 was for grades nine through twelve. The top floor consisted of an elaborate, fan-shaped auditorium with a wooden floor sloping to the edge of the stage. There were only two small classrooms located on the third floor.

=== Oil boom: 1924-1929 ===
The discovery of oil around Wortham in 1924 brought money and pupils into the school over the Thanksgiving holiday. On Thanksgiving Day 1924, the Simmons Wild Cat Oil Well came in. The town of 1,000 became a town of 20,000 people almost over night. With each family, came numerous children until the classrooms were suddenly running over. Mrs. Angie Williams, teacher of third grade at that time, recalls the following experience: On Wednesday afternoon, November 23, 1924, at 4 o'clock, school was dismissed for the Thanksgiving holidays. The third grade consisted of 18 (eighteen) pupils ranging in ages from 9 to 10 years. On Thursday afternoon, the Simmons's well blew in making several thousand barrels of oil daily. Families began flocking into Wortham. By Monday morning the peaceful little town was seething with excitement; the children came from every direction to enroll in school. By 10:30 o'clock that morning, the teacher had enrolled 66 children in the third grade, making her a class of 84 in all. (Ibid. p. 211) They ranged from 8 to 14 years of age and came from public and parochial schools in Texas, Oklahoma, Louisiana, and New Mexico. Classrooms had desks to accommodate 24 children; so, after sitting them two to the desk and three if the children were small, wooden crates from the downtown merchants were lined up around the walls for the others. Due to lack of text books, most of the work had to be written on the board. What was true of the third grade was also in the other grades with exception of high school. Fewer high school children were enrolled.

Uel L. Davis Jr., a first grade student at the time of the oil boom, recalled that he and several of the students who lived on the east side of town, continued their year of education in the home of Mrs. Ada Peurifoy. With the number of people and the types of people that had infiltrated the small town of Wortham, their parents did not feel it was safe for the children to cross through town to the public school. (Past Interview)

By 1926, there were twenty-three teachers and 600 students in the school. With twenty-seven affiliated units of instruction offered, the school was placed on the southern accrediting list of high schools.

=== 1930s ===
In the year 1932, Mr. F. W. Wheeler became the principal and agriculture teacher. Mr. Wheeler, principal, developed a strong industrial program along with the basic curriculum. It was under his administration that the school became Tuskegee of the West Training School, named after the Tuskegee Institute founded by Booker T. Washington in Georgia. The Wortham school had a farm where the students participated in growing fruits and vegetables. This produce was sold fresh or canned in the school's cannery. One of the products grown on this farm was broom corn. The school had a broom factory where they made brooms. There was also a printing shop where the basics of printing could be learned and job printing could be done for the public. His efforts brought state-wide publicity to the school. February 27, 1933, F. W. Wheeler resigned (Wortham ISD Board minutes. February 27, 1933) and A. E. Alton became principal and agriculture teacher. Under the administration of Mr. Alton, the name of the school changed back to Wortham Colored School. During the administration of Mr. M. W. Evans, 1940–49, the school became known for its interscholastic abilities in the county, region and state. The school had outgrown the old facilities and the school board decided a new building was very much needed. In 1957, the new building was opened and named F. W. Wheeler in this memory. Afro-American students continued their education there until 1966 when integration brought the students from the F. W. Wheeler School to join the students at Wortham Schools. (Once Is Not Enough, by F. W. Wheeler Ex-Student Association, pg.3) (Freestone County Deed Records).

In keeping with the state policy of annexation and consolidation, New Hope and McLeod School Districts were added to the Wortham School District after 1927. Students from Rushing and Mt. Nebo schools who chose, were allowed to attend the Wortham Schools beginning the 1936 school year. (Wortham ISD Board minutes, July 13, 1936) By 1948, both schools had fully consolidated. Tehuancana Valley and Currie schools were added in 1939. About this same time, Harmony Hill also joined the Wortham schools. In 1941, Shanks School consolidated with Kirvin, and in 1949, Kirvin Schools consolidated with Wortham, giving a total of 115 square miles (300 km^{2}) in the district. (Freestone County Deed Records.) When the Richland ISD closed in the late 1960s, its students were drawn into the Corsicana ISD; however, because of the location, Wortham ISD stated they would not run buses to the Richland community, but would accept any student without charge. (Wortham ISD School Board minutes, Sept. 18, 1963.)

Clara Lucas Benton, 1938 graduate of Currie, stated that in 1927 a white duplex home was brought into town and served as the first grade building. This building was located on the west side of the elementary school. The first grade teachers at that time were Mrs. T. E. Longbotham and Mrs. Elizabeth Randolf Croucen. Second grade class was located on the second story of the elementary building and the third grade was downstairs. Mrs. Benton recalls sliding down the huge curving slide leading from the second story of the elementary building to the ground during fire drills.

On August 1, 1939, citizens of the Wortham Independent School District voted a $6,500 bond to build a gymnasium. In 1940, the football stadium was also erected at the cost of $9,000. Native sandstone from the hills of Tehuacana, Texas, was used for both projects. Government assistance through the Public Works Administration made both these projects possible.

=== 1940s ===
Around 1946 there was a need for a lunchroom. A kitchen was located in the lower northwest corner of the gymnasium. (1948 The Bark, pg. 56.); The children entered the gymnasium from the south entrance and were given their lunch through serving windows. Each morning Mr. Quince Cox, custodian, set up tables and chairs on the gym floor for the students and the faculty to eat lunch. The high school study hall students hurriedly completed their assignments in order to volunteer to help Mr. Quince. At the end of lunch, the same students would help Mr. Quince take down the tables and chairs. Mr. Quince would mop the floor and have the gymnasium ready for the 2:30 p.m. high school physical education class.

In 1949, a $40,000 bond was voted to make repairs to both of the school buildings. This proved to be a temporary measure because in 1955, the corner of the high school building cracked, plaster fell and the building was condemned. The students in this building completed their year of education in the Methodist Church and locations around campus. Mattie Deck Stubbs was present in the library when the plaster fell. She recalls Mrs. Nell Jolly completed teaching the year of homemaking in the concession stand of the gym, Mrs. Sadie Stubbs taught English in the bus barn, and Joe Stooksberry taught history in the boys' dressing room in the gym.

=== 1950-1995 ===
The year of 1957, the citizens voted an additional $175,000 school bond. With this issue, both of the old buildings were to undergo a drastic change. The upper story of the high school building was removed. The architects dug under the building, raised the corner with jacks and poured cement in the hole with jacks in place. At this time a complete remodeling and modernization was undertaken. A new and modern one story grade school building was erected between the two older buildings. The amount of $16, 059 was used to renovate the old grammar school building by removing the top story and converting the remaining floor into a modern cafetorium. (WISD Board minutes, June 17, 1958) At this time, the school bell was removed from the tower and placed in front of the elementary as an Ex-Student Memorial.

Increases in student activities and the continued success of the drama department, led to the need for a larger assembly area. In 1974, Wortham ISD accepted a $62,486.00 bid from Wortham Building and Supply Company. Using local funds, a new auditorium was built for student use. (Wortham ISD Board minutes, April 15, 1974)

WISD has continued to grow and build. In order to meet needs, a bond election was held for a new high school building and, on November 23, 1985, passed 211 for and 198 against. A bid was accepted from S.C. Maxwell Co. for $624,840.00. The new high school building was completed in 1986 on the west side of the elementary building.

Modernization was desperately needed for the cafetorium. In 1989, Wortham ISD School Board Members voted to use $297,089.04 of local funds to build a new cafeteria and remodel the cafetorium to be used as a kindergarten / first grade building. The bid from DSA Construction Mgr. was accepted and construction began. (Wortham ISD Board minutes, May 25, 1989.) The cafeteria is being used to feed the students from kindergarten through high school.

The students of WISD were continuing to play competitive sports in the 1940 gymnasium. Universal Interscholastic League had noted on several occasions the floor was not regulation size. WISD began saving funds in order to build a new facility. Once again, using $462,731.76 of local funds and the DSA Construction Mgr., construction began on the west end of the cafeteria. (Wortham ISD Board minutes, November 16, 1993.) The new gymnasium was completed in 1994. The original building is presently being used for P.E. classes, Little Dribbler basketball games and Wortham Ex-Student activities.

In the fall of 1995, a bond was passed to build a middle school wing which is located on the south end of the high school building and a new kindergarten and first grade building.

=== 21st century ===
Wortham High School is in a new high school that was completed the end of the 2012 school year. Wortham High School has partnered with Navarro College to offer many dual credit classes as well.

== Superintendents of Wortham High School ==
1834 = Robert Longbotham
1883 = Professor Miller, Principal
1885-1890 = Professor Kirvin, Principal
1918-1929 = C. V. Reed
1929-1934 = L. A. Roberts
1934-1935 = L. D. Williams
1935-1937 = W. D. Murphy
1938-1941 = John A. Freeman
1941-1945 = C. G. Masterson
1945-1949 = J. Mil Auld
1949-1951 = L. B. T. Sikes
1951-1952 = T. F. Cloud
1952-1955 = Clayton Oakes
1955-1956 = George E. Moore
1957-1963 = James E. Robertson
1963-1966 = Eldon Edge
1966-1969 = J. W. Gibson
1969-1980 = Wayne Poe
1980-1986 = C. T. Griffin
1986-1989 = Randy Butler
1989-1992 = Sandra Lowery
1992-1993 = Albert Thompson
1993-1997 = Edward Donahue
1997-2000 = Rick Larkin
2000-2005 = Jack Thomason
2005–2011 = Albert Armer
2011–2014 = Dr. Bruce Tabor
2014–Present = David Allen
