= Oakwood Bank =

Bank based in Dallas Texas

- Type: Privately held company
- Industry: Banking
- Founded: 1900
- Defunct: October 1, 2024
- Fate: Merged into b1BANK
- Headquarters: Oakwood, Texas
- Key people: Roy J. Salley, CEO
- Total assets: $384 million (2019)
- Total equity: $42 million (2019)
- Website: www.oakwoodbank.com

Oakwood Bank was a bank based in Dallas, Texas, founded in Oakwood, Texas, that had six offices in 2024. It was a subsidiary of Oakwood Bancshares, Inc., a bank holding company, until Business First Bancshares acquired the holding company effective October 1, 2024, and merged Oakwood Bank into its subsidiary, b1BANK.

== History ==
The bank was founded in 1900 under the name Oakwood State Bank. In 1958, Roddy Rawls Wiley, Jr. took over the bank after his father died.

In 2005, the bank received a "substantial noncompliance" rating for lack of compliance with the Community Reinvestment Act. In 2009, the bank was referred to as "America's Smallest Bank" as it had only $3 million in total assets and $2.13 million in total deposits.

For most of its existence, in addition to Wiley, the bank had only 2 other employees, 76-year-old Lela Coates and 71-year-old Neta Eldridge. It had no automated teller machines.

After the death of Wiley in 2010, the bank was acquired by Dorothy Cadenhead. In April 2017, it raised $38 million in capital by selling a controlling stake to new management, allowing the bank to open a branch in Dallas.

On October 1, 2024, Business First Bancshares, Inc. completed the purchase of the holding company that controls the financial institution that was once known as Oakwood State Bank until obtaining its current name.
