= Larry Rose III =

American gridiron football player (born 1995)

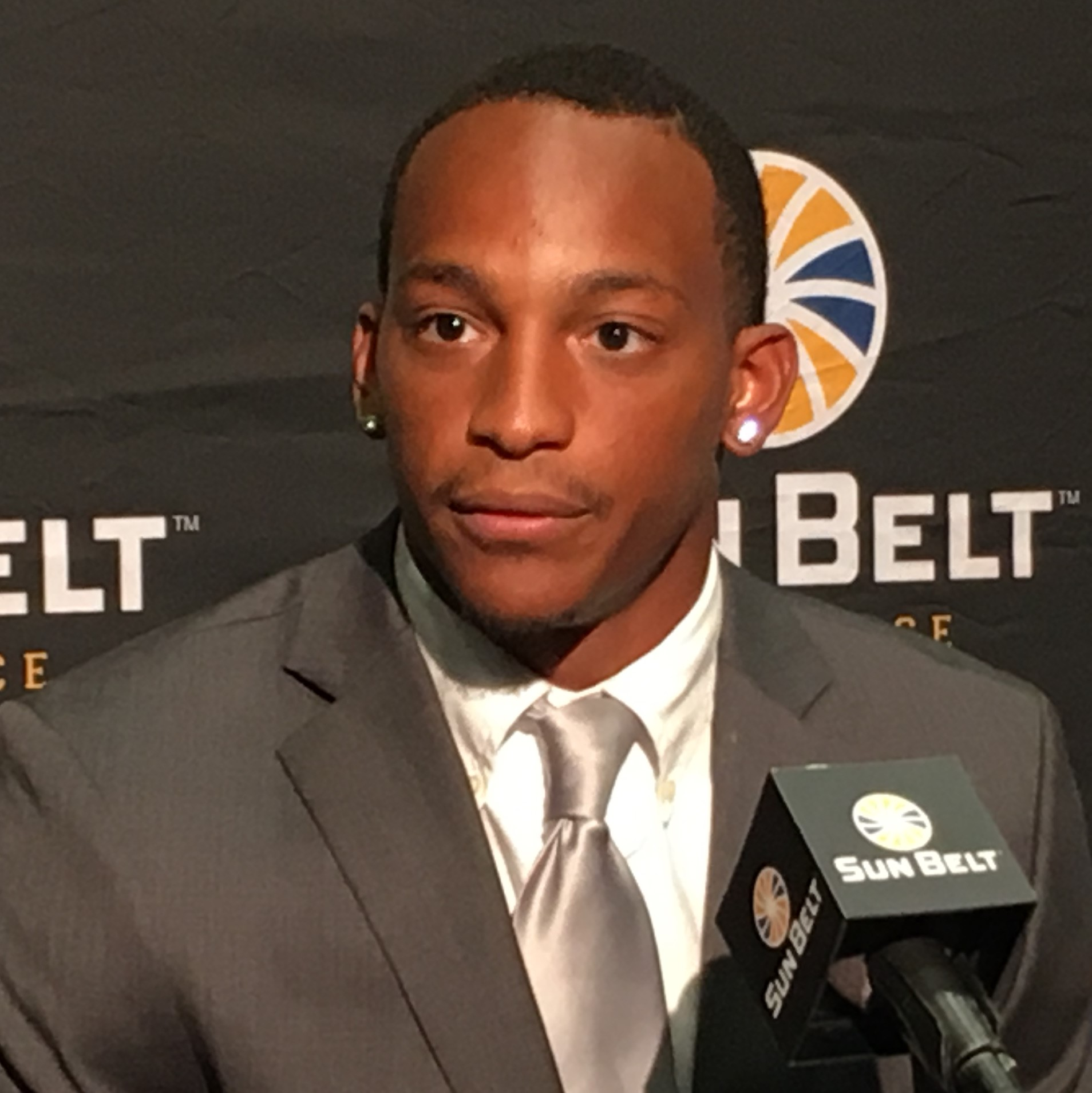
- Rose at the 2017 Sun Belt Media Day

No. 3
- Position: Running back

Personal information
- Born: September 9, 1995 (age 31); Fairfield, Texas, U.S.
- Listed height: 5 ft 11 in (1.80 m)
- Listed weight: 194 lb (88 kg)

Career information
- High school: Fairfield
- College: New Mexico State (2014–2017)
- NFL draft: 2018: undrafted

Career history
- Tennessee Titans (2018)*; Los Angeles Rams (2018)*; Arizona Hotshots (2019); Winnipeg Blue Bombers (2019); Los Angeles Wildcats (2020); New Orleans Breakers (2022)
- * Offseason or practice squad member only

Awards and highlights
- 2017 Arizona Bowl Most Valuable Player; Third-team All-American (2015); Sun Belt Offensive Player of the Year (2015); First-team All-Sun Belt (2015); Second-team All-Sun Belt (2017)

Larry Rose III (born September 9, 1995) is an American former professional football running back. He played college football for the New Mexico State Aggies, earning third-team All-American honors in 2015. He was signed by the Tennessee Titans as an undrafted free agent after the 2018 NFL draft.

== Early life ==
A native of Fairfield, Texas, Rose attended Fairfield High School.

== College career ==
At New Mexico State University, Rose became the starting running back for the Aggies as a true freshman. He was named an honorable mention All-Sun Belt Conference.

Year	Team	Rushing					Receiving		
Year	Team	Att	Yards	Avg	Yds/G	TD	Rec	Yards	TD
2014	New Mexico State	186	1,102	5.9	100.2	9	23	172	1
2015	New Mexico State	239	1,657	6.9	138.1	14	30	269	2
2016	New Mexico State	159	865	5.4	96.1	4	25	180	0
2017	New Mexico State	186	934	5.0	77.8	10	55	522	2
Totals		770	4,558	5.9	99.1	37	133	1,157	5

== Professional career ==
=== Tennessee Titans ===
Rose signed with the Tennessee Titans as an undrafted free agent on May 2, 2018. On May 14, 2018, Rose was waived by the Titans.

=== Los Angeles Rams ===
On May 15, 2018, Rose was claimed off waivers by the Los Angeles Rams. He was waived on June 18, 2018. He was re-signed on August 28, 2018, only to be waived four days later on September 1.

=== Arizona Hotshots ===
Rose signed with the Arizona Hotshots of the AAF in 2018. He was waived on February 21, 2019, after playing in one game.

=== Winnipeg Blue Bombers ===
Rose signed with the Winnipeg Blue Bombers of the Canadian Football League on February 25, 2019. He was released on April 24, but re-signed on April 29. He was released before the start of the regular season on June 9, but was re-signed on September 4. He was moved down to the practice roster on September 20, and was released on September 24.

=== Los Angeles Wildcats ===
Rose was drafted in the 5th round of the 2020 XFL draft to the Los Angeles Wildcats. He had his contract terminated when the league suspended operations on April 10, 2020.

=== New Orleans Breakers ===
Rose was selected in the 27th round of the 2022 USFL draft by the New Orleans Breakers of the United States Football League. He was transferred to the team's practice squad before the start of the regular season on April 16, and remained on the inactive roster on April 22. He was transferred to the active roster on April 30. The Breakers moved Rose back to the inactive roster on May 12. On February 9, 2023, Rose was released by the Breakers.
