= Tony Brackens =

American football player (born 1974)

No. 90
- Position: Defensive end

Personal information
- Born: December 26, 1974 (age 51); Fairfield, Texas, U.S.
- Listed height: 6 ft 4 in (1.93 m)
- Listed weight: 267 lb (121 kg)

Career information
- High school: Fairfield
- College: Texas
- NFL draft: 1996: 2nd round, 33rd overall pick

Career history
- Jacksonville Jaguars (1996–2004)

Awards and highlights
- Second-team All-Pro (1999); Pro Bowl (1999); 2× NFL forced fumbles co-leader (1997, 1999); PFWA All-Rookie Team (1996); Consensus All-American (1995); 3× First-team All-SWC (1993, 1994, 1995); Southwest Conference Champion - (1994, 1995); 1994 Sun Bowl Champion

Career NFL statistics
- Tackles: 362
- Sacks: 55
- Forced fumbles: 27
- Interceptions: 5
- Stats at Pro Football Reference

Tony Lynn Brackens Jr. (born December 26, 1974) is an American former professional football player who spent his entire nine-year career as a defensive end for the Jacksonville Jaguars of the National Football League (NFL). He played college football for the Texas Longhorns, earning consensus All-American honors. A second-round pick in the 1996 NFL draft, Brackens was named a second-team All-Pro and selected to the Pro Bowl with Jacksonville in 1999.

== Early life ==
Brackens was born and raised in Fairfield, Texas. He attended Fairfield High School, and played for the Fairfield Eagles high school football team.

He was named to the Texas High School Sports Hall of Fame in 2022.

== College career ==
Brackens attended the University of Texas at Austin, where he played for the Texas Longhorns football team from 1993 to 1995. He developed a reputation as a ferocious hitter as a defensive end. In 1993 he broke Tim Campbell's school record for most tackles for a loss by a freshman in school history with 16 and also led the team in the stat. He also led the team in sacks with 10, the 2nd most in a season by a freshman in school history. He was named to the All-Southwest Conference team.

During his sophomore year in 1994, he helped lead the Longhorns to a share of the Southwest Conference Championship, victory in the 1994 Sun Bowl and an end-of-year ranking of #23. He tied linebacker Tyson King to lead the team in tackles. He again led the team in tackles for a loss and sacks, and also led in blocked kicks. He was again named to the All-Southwest Conference team.

As a junior in 1995, he was recognized as a consensus first-team All-American and was also, for the 3rd time, a first-team All-Southwest Conference selection. For the 3rd straight year led the team in tackles for a loss (tied with Chris Akins) and sacks; and also led the team in forced fumbles, a school-record tying 5 fumble recoveries and blocked kicks (again). He was a key contributor to the 1995 Longhorns team that went 10-1, won the Southwest Conference, gained a berth in the 1996 Sugar Bowl against the Virginia Tech Hokies and finished ranked #14. he was also named to the AFCA Good Works team for efforts on the field and in the community.

He elected to forego his senior year to enter the NFL draft. He finished his career ranked fifth in tackles and eighth in sacks in Longhorns' school history.

He was selected for the Longhorn Hall of Honor in 2006.

== Professional career ==
He was taken in the second round of the 1996 NFL draft, 33rd overall, by the Jacksonville Jaguars, for whom he played his entire professional career. His lone Pro Bowl appearance came in 2000, after the 1999 season in which he had 12 sacks and 8 forced fumbles. When he retired, he held the all-time Jacksonville Jaguars records for several categories: sacks (55), fumble recoveries (13) and forced fumbles (28) and was the leading tackler (all-time) among Jaguars defensive ends.

He was released in 2004, after a series of troubling leg injuries and operations. He ultimately decided to retire, saying that recent rule changes had made it impossible for him to play his style of football. He said, "Mentally and physically, I thought I could probably still do it, but I didn’t want to put up with all the rule changes. All the stuff they’re doing to players takes the fun out of the game." The moment in which he was let go was captured by NFL Films in "Jacksonville Jaguars: Inside the Training Camp", an unofficial version of the Hard Knocks TV series.

== NFL statistics ==
=== Regular season ===
Year	Team	GP	Tackles				Fumbles		Interceptions					
Year	Team	GP	Comb	Solo	Ast	Sack	FF	FR	Int	Yds	Avg	Lng	TD	PD
1996	JAX	16	55	45	10	7.0	5	3	1	27	27.0	27	0	9
1997	JAX	15	41	38	3	7.0	5	1	0	0	0.0	0	0	7
1998	JAX	12	39	27	12	3.5	1	3	0	0	0.0	0	0	8
1999	JAX	16	66	53	13	12.0	8	2	2	16	8.0	16	1	8
2000	JAX	16	61	53	8	7.5	2	2	1	7	7.0	7	0	8
2001	JAX	12	42	39	3	11.0	5	1	0	0	0.0	0	0	6
2002	JAX	5	11	9	2	1.0	0	1	0	0	0.0	0	0	1
2003	JAX	15	38	32	6	6.0	2	0	1	4	4.0	4	0	2
Career		107	353	296	57	55.0	28	13	5	54	10.8	27	1	49

=== Postseason ===
Year	Team	GP	Tackles				Fumbles	
Year	Team	GP	Comb	Solo	Ast	Sack	FF	FR
1996	JAX	3	8	6	2	1.0	1	0
1997	JAX	1	6	4	2	0.0	0	0
1998	JAX	1	2	2	0	1.0	0	1
1999	JAX	2	7	7	0	2.0	2	2
Career		7	23	19	4	4.0	3	3

== Later life ==
After retiring from football, Brackens moved to a ranch near Fairfield, adjacent to the property on which he was raised by his parents.
