= Oakwood, Texas =

- Town
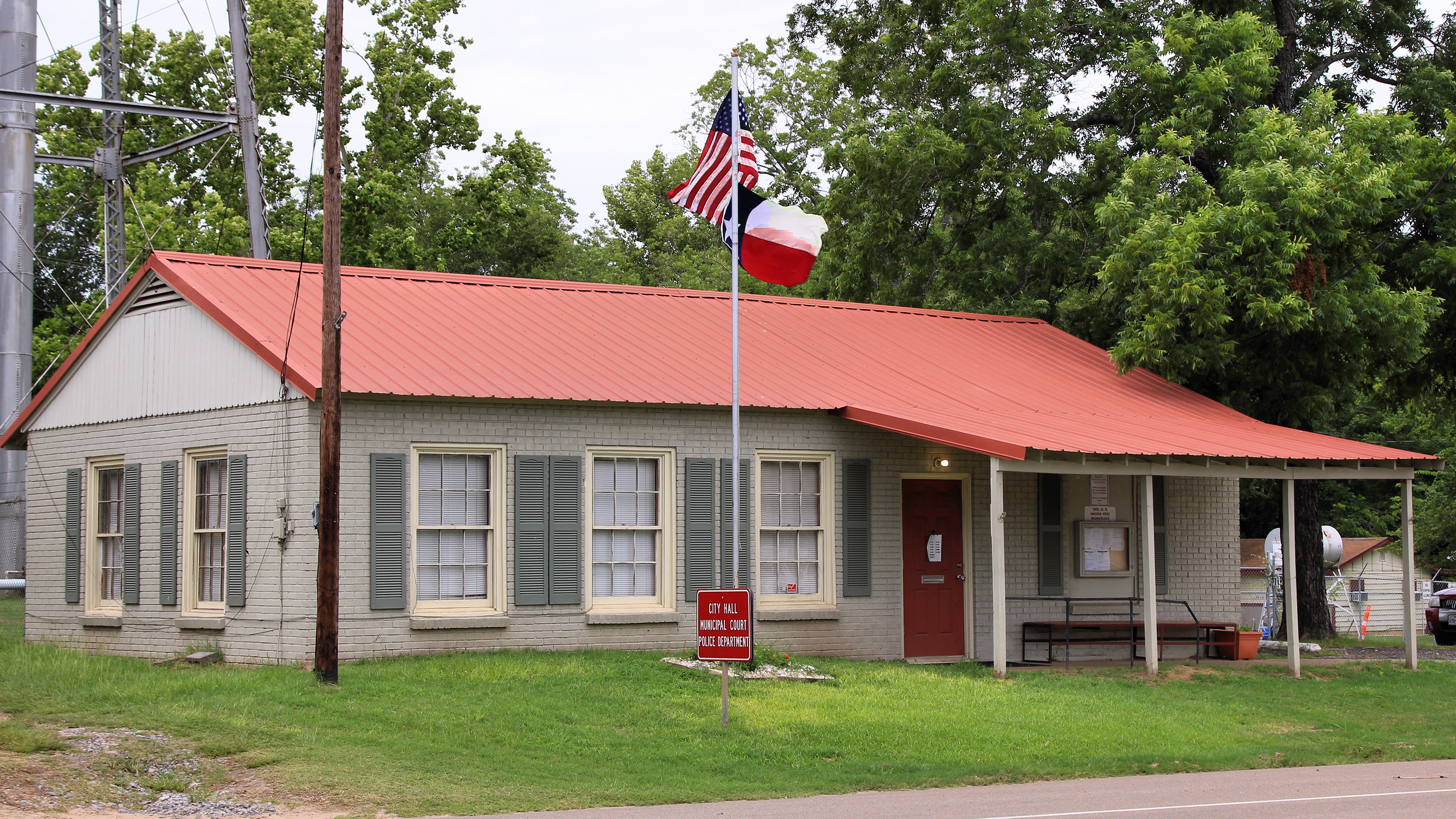
- Oakwood City Hall

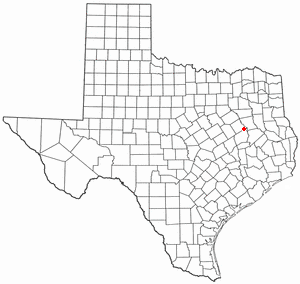
- Location of Oakwood, Texas

- Coordinates: 31°35′05″N 95°51′00″W
- Country: United States
- State: Texas
- Counties: Leon, Freestone

Area
  - Total: 1.13 sq mi (2.93 km^{2})
  - Land: 1.13 sq mi (2.93 km^{2})
  - Water: 0 sq mi (0.00 km^{2})
- Elevation: 282 ft (86 m)

Population (2020)
  - Total: 389
  - Density: 455.4/sq mi (175.85/km^{2})
- Time zone: UTC-6 (Central (CST))
  - Summer (DST): UTC-5 (CDT)
- ZIP code: 75855
- Area codes: 903, 430
- FIPS code: 48-53232
- GNIS feature ID: 2413071
- Website: www.cityofoakwood.tx.citygovt.org

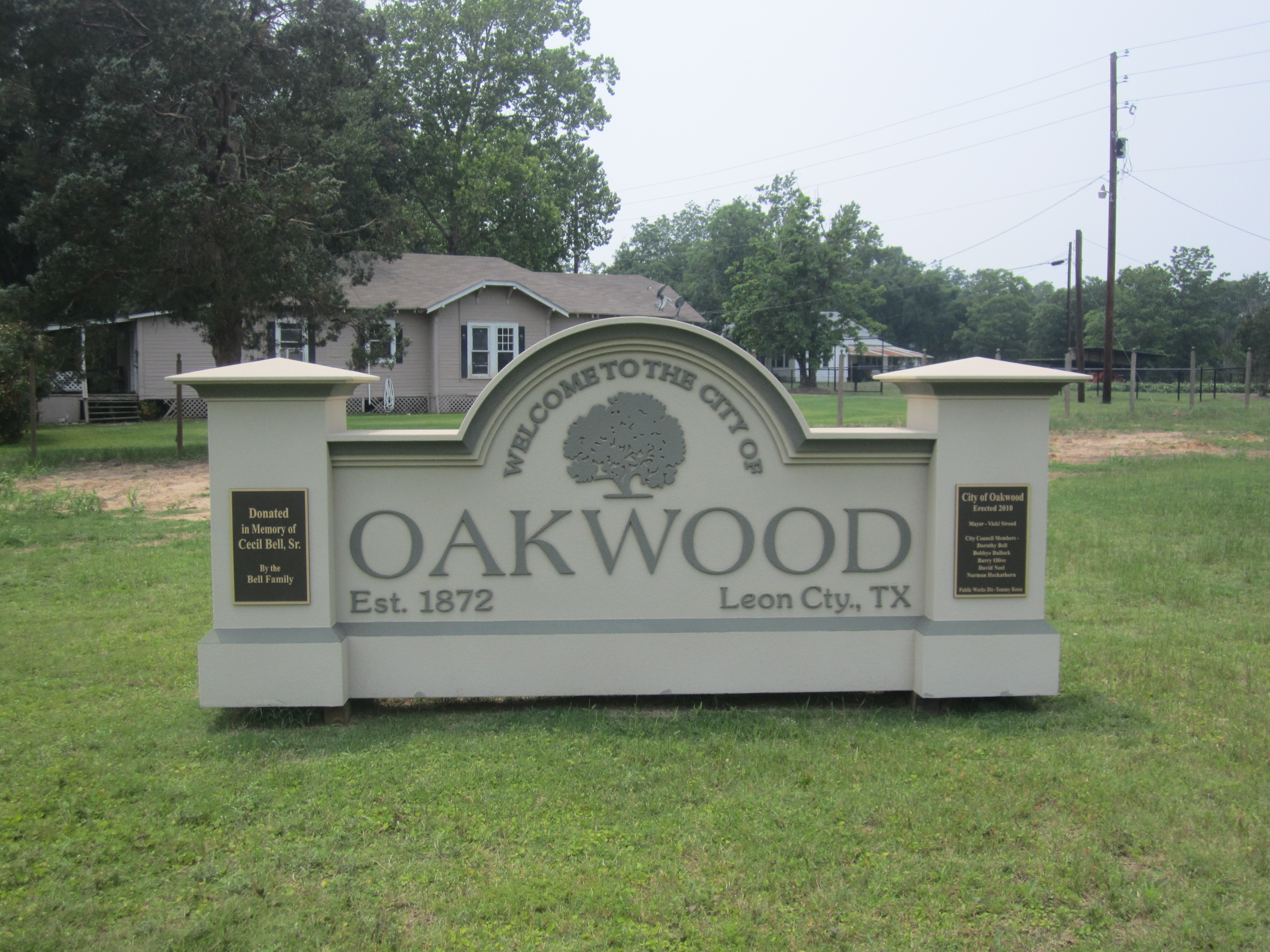
Oakwood welcome sign

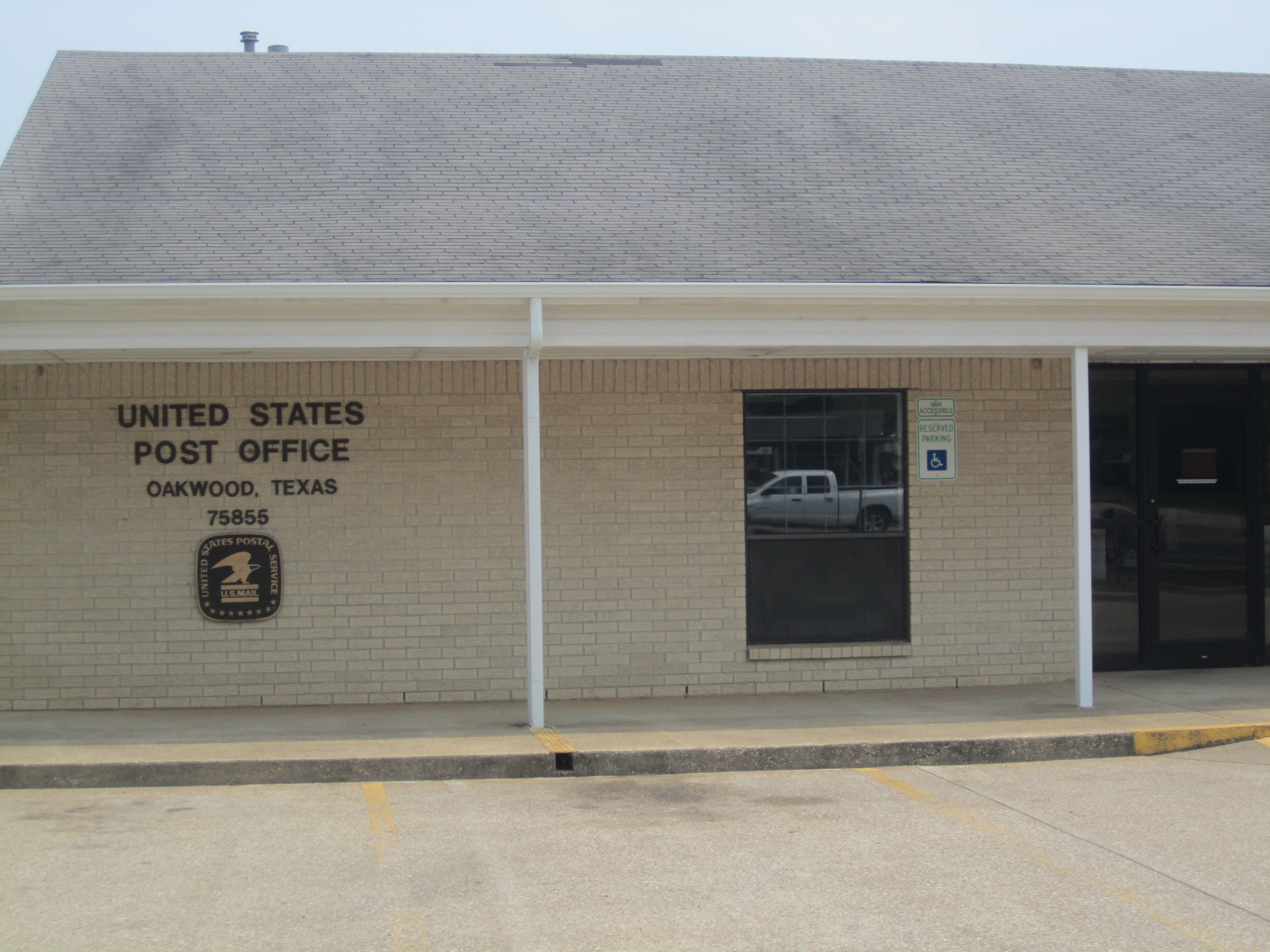
U.S. Post Office in Oakwood

Oakwood is a town in Leon and Freestone counties in the U.S. state of Texas. The population was 389 at the 2020 census. It was founded in 1872 as a stop on the International Railroad.

== Geography ==
Oakwood is located in northeastern Leon County. USGS topographic maps show the northern town boundary following the Leon/Freestone County line, but maps by the U.S. Census show the town extending slightly north into Freestone County.

U.S. Route 79 passes through the town as Broad Street, leading northeast 18 miles (29 km) to Palestine and southwest 15 miles (24 km) to Buffalo.

According to the United States Census Bureau, the town has a total area of 1.13 square miles (2.93 km^{2}), all land.

== Demographics ==
Historical population
Census	Pop.	Note	%±
1880	96		—
1890	231		140.6%
1910	906		—
1920	1,100		21.4%
1930	888		−19.3%
1940	1,086		22.3%
1950	759		−30.1%
1960	716		−5.7%
1970	547		−23.6%
1980	606		10.8%
1990	527		−13.0%
2000	471		−10.6%
2010	510		8.3%
2020	389		−23.7%
U.S. Decennial Census

Oakwood racial composition as of 2020 (NH = Non-Hispanic) (Note: Note: the US Census treats Hispanic/Latino as an ethnic category. This table excludes Latinos from the racial categories and assigns them to a separate category. Hispanics/Latinos can be of any race.)
Race	Number	Percentage
White (NH)	232	59.64%
Black or African American (NH)	115	29.56%
Native American or Alaska Native (NH)	3	0.77%
Asian (NH)	5	1.29%
Some Other Race (NH)	1	0.26%
Mixed/Multi-Racial (NH)	21	5.4%
Hispanic or Latino	12	3.08%
Total	389	

As of the 2020 United States census, there were 389 people, 236 households, and 193 families residing in the town.

As of the census of 2000, there were 471 people, 199 households, and 131 families residing in the town. The population density was 429.9 inhabitants per square mile (166.0/km^{2}). There were 256 housing units at an average density of 233.7 per square mile (90.2/km^{2}). The racial makeup of the town was 62.42% White, 35.03% African American, 0.21% Native American, 0.21% Asian, 1.70% from other races, and 0.42% from two or more races. Hispanic or Latino of any race were 3.18% of the population.

There were 199 households, out of which 23.6% had children under the age of 18 living with them, 44.2% were married couples living together, 17.1% had a female householder with no husband present, and 33.7% were non-families. 30.2% of all households were made up of individuals, and 16.1% had someone living alone who was 65 years of age or older. The average household size was 2.37 and the average family size was 2.94.

In the town, the population was spread out, with 24.0% under the age of 18, 7.9% from 18 to 24, 19.7% from 25 to 44, 27.6% from 45 to 64, and 20.8% who were 65 years of age or older. The median age was 44 years. For every 100 females, there were 88.4 males. For every 100 females age 18 and over, there were 82.7 males.

The median income for a household in the town was $25,625, and the median income for a family was $33,750. Males had a median income of $34,375 versus $20,938 for females. The per capita income for the town was $16,371. About 13.9% of families and 19.6% of the population were below the poverty line, including 14.3% of those under age 18 and 26.6% of those age 65 or over.

== Education ==
The town is served by the Oakwood Independent School District.

== Notable people ==
- R. H. Bing, mathematician, born in Oakwood on October 20, 1914
- Sarah Lancaster, Sacred Harp composer, lived in Oakwood from the 1880s, died there in 1918 and is buried in the town cemetery.

== Climate ==
The climate in this area is characterized by hot, humid summers and generally mild to cool winters. According to the Köppen Climate Classification system, Oakwood has a humid subtropical climate, abbreviated "Cfa" on climate maps.

== See also ==
- Oakwood State Bank
