= Teague Independent School District =

School district in Texas

Address
- 420 N 10th Teague, Texas, 75860; United States

District information
- Grades: PK–12
- Schools: 4
- NCES District ID: 4842300
- District ID: TX-081904

Students and staff
- Students: 1,251 (2023–24)
- Teachers: 96.82 (FTE
- Student–teacher ratio: 12.92

Other information
- Website: www.teagueisd.org

Teague Independent School District is a public school district based in Teague, Texas, United States. The school received an accountability rating of A for the 2021-2022 school year by the Texas Education Agency.

== Description ==
The district serves the city and surrounding areas, providing education from pre-kindergarten through 12th grade. The district includes Teague Elementary School, Teague Junior High School, Teague Lion Academy, and Teague High School.

The district offers a variety of extracurricular activities, including athletics, band, theater, and Future Farmers of America (FFA).

== Athletics ==
The athletics mascots are the teague lions (football, basketball, baseball, ect.) and the lady lions (volleyball, woman's basketball, cheer, ect.)

== School district data ==
As of the 2021-2022 school year, it had 1,181 students. 48.8% of students were considered at risk of dropping out of school. 10% of students were enrolled in bilingual and English language learning programs.

The school received an accountability rating of A for the 2021-2022 school year.

In the Class of 2021, 97.3% of students received their high school diplomas on time or earlier. The dropout rate for students in grades 9-12 was 0.2% during the 2020-2021 school year.

The average ACT score was 20.8.

As of the 2021-2022 school year, an average teacher's salary was $53,708, which is $5,179 less than the state average. On average, teachers had 13.1 years of experience.

== Schools ==
There are four schools.

- Teague High School (grades 9–12)
- Teague Lion Academy (grades 9–12)
- Teague Junior High School (grades 5–8)
- Teague Elementary School (grades PK–4)

== Demographics ==
=== Ethnicity ===
Ethnicity	Percentage
African American	10.1%
American Indian	0%
Asian	0.4%
Hispanic	33.4%
Pacific Islander	0%
White	52.2%
Two or more races	3.9%

=== Risk factors ===
A student is identified as being at risk of dropping out of school based on state-defined criteria. A student is defined as "economically disadvantaged" if he or she is eligible for free or reduced-price lunch or other public assistance.

Demographic	Percentage
At-risk students	48.8%
Economically disadvantaged	66.7%
Limited English proficiency	10.1%

=== Teacher demographics and salary ===
Below are the teacher demographics and salary averages of Teague ISD as well as the statewide averages.

Ethnicity	Teague ISD Percentage	Statewide Percentage
African American	6.4%	11.2%
American Indian	0%	0.3%
Asian	0%	1.9%
Hispanic	6.4%	28.9%
Pacific Islander	0%	0.1%
White	86.1%	56.4%
Two or more races	1.1%	1.2%

Experience Level	Teague ISD Average Salary	Statewide Average Salary
Base average	$53,708	$58,887
Beginner	$39,241	$51,054
1 to 5 years	$42,708	$54,577
6 to 10 years	$49,441	$57,746
11 to 20 years	$54,677	$61,377
21 to 30 years	$64,012	$65,949
30+ years	$85,034	$71,111
