= Louis Cheek =

American football player (born 1964)

No. 77, 72, 75, 78
- Position: Offensive tackle

Personal information
- Born: October 6, 1964 (age 62); Galveston, Texas, U.S.
- Listed height: 6 ft 6 in (1.98 m)
- Listed weight: 295 lb (134 kg)

Career information
- High school: Fairfield (TX)
- College: Texas A&M
- NFL draft: 1988: 8th round, 220th overall pick

Career history
- Miami Dolphins (1988–1989); Dallas Cowboys (1990); Philadelphia Eagles (1990); Green Bay Packers (1991)

Awards and highlights
- Third-team All-American (1987); 2× First-team All-SWC (1986, 1987)

Career NFL statistics
- Games played: 45
- Games started: 11
- Stats at Pro Football Reference

Louis Ray Cheek, Jr. (born October 6, 1964) is an American former professional football player who was an offensive tackle in the National Football League (NFL) for the Miami Dolphins, Dallas Cowboys, Philadelphia Eagles, and Green Bay Packers. He played college football for the Texas A&M Aggies and was selected by the Dolphins in the eighth round of the 1988 NFL draft.

== Early life ==
Cheek attended Fairfield High School. He lettered in football and track. He competed in rodeos until his sophomore season.

He accepted a football scholarship from Texas A&M University. He became a four-year starter at left tackle, while helping the team win three Southwest Conference championships (1985-1987).

== Professional career ==
=== Miami Dolphins ===
Cheek was selected by the Miami Dolphins in the 8th round (220th overall) of the 1988 NFL draft. As a rookie, he appeared in 15 games as a backup left tackle.

In 1989, he appeared in 13 games with one start at right tackle in place of an injured Jon Giesler. In his only start, he faced future pro football hall of famer Bruce Smith and held him sackless.

=== Dallas Cowboys ===
On March 29, 1990, the Dallas Cowboys signed Cheek as a Plan B free agent. He appeared in 4 games as a backup offensive tackle. He was released on December 10.

=== Philadelphia Eagles ===
On December 12, 1990, he was claimed off waivers by the Philadelphia Eagles. He appeared in one game with one start.

=== Green Bay Packers ===
On March 29, 1991, he was signed as free agent by the Green Bay Packers. August 28, he was placed on the injured reserve list. On September 24, he was activated from the injured reserve list. He appeared in 12 games with 9 starts at left tackle. On August 31, 1992, he was released.
