= Leonard Davis (American football) =

American football player (born 1978)

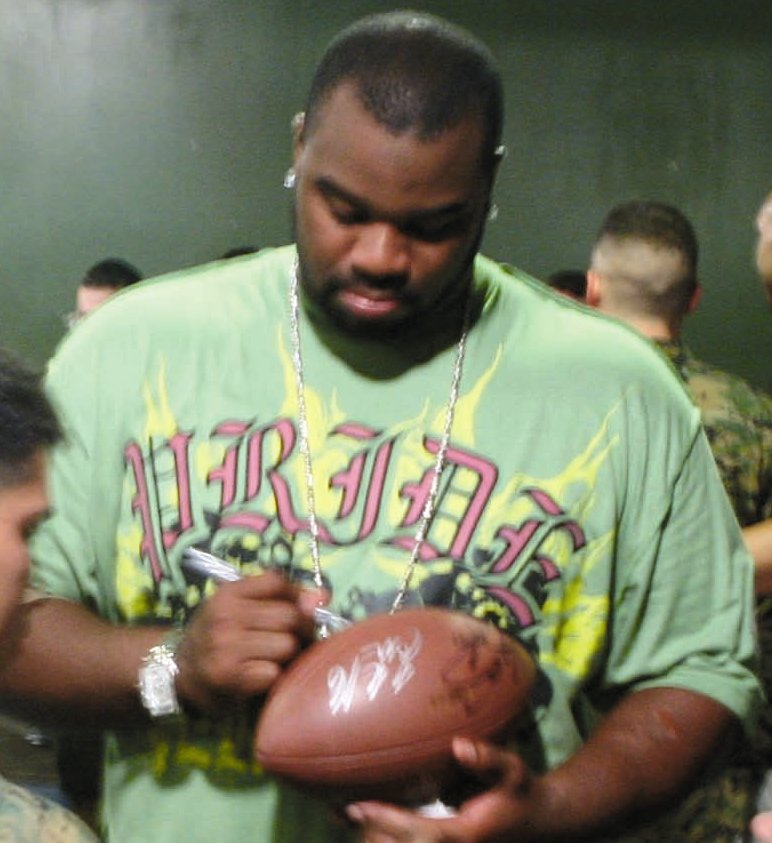
- Davis in 2008

No. 75, 70, 68
- Position: Guard

Personal information
- Born: September 5, 1978 (age 48); Wortham, Texas, U.S.
- Listed height: 6 ft 6 in (1.98 m)
- Listed weight: 355 lb (161 kg)

Career information
- High school: Wortham
- College: Texas (1997–2000)
- NFL draft: 2001: 1st round, 2nd overall pick

Career history
- Arizona Cardinals (2001–2006); Dallas Cowboys (2007–2010); Detroit Lions (2011); San Francisco 49ers (2012)

Awards and highlights
- Second-team All-Pro (2007); 3× Pro Bowl (2007–2009); PFWA All-Rookie Team (2001); Consensus All-American (2000); First-team All-Big 12 (2000); Cotton Bowl Champion

Career NFL statistics
- Games played: 171
- Games started: 155
- Fumble recoveries: 2
- Stats at Pro Football Reference

Leonard Barnett Davis (born September 5, 1978) is an American former professional football player who was a guard for 12 seasons in the National Football League (NFL). He was a consensus All-American playing college football for the Texas Longhorns, where he was also a two-time Outland Trophy finalist and a Lombardi Award semifinalist. Davis was selected by the Arizona Cardinals with the second overall pick in the 2001 NFL draft. He played for the Cardinals, the Dallas Cowboys - where he was a three-time Pro-Bowler and a second team All-Pro - and the San Francisco 49ers, with whom he went to Super Bowl XLVII. He also spent part of a season with the Detroit Lions, but never took the field for them.

== Early life ==
Leonard grew up in Wortham, Texas. He is the only child of L.A. and Sammie Lee Davis, but has 21 half-brothers and half-sisters (L.A. had 11 children from a previous marriage, while Sammie Lee had 10 children from a previous marriage).

Davis attended Wortham High School, where he led his Bulldogs basketball team to the state championship in 1997 and the football team to the 2nd round of the 1996 Texas High School Football Playoffs. He was a Parade All-American in football and USA Today first-team All-American playing defense and offense for a school with fewer than 150 students. Davis also lettered in track.

He was inducted into the Texas High School Sports Hall of Fame in 2023.

== College career ==
Davis played college football at the University of Texas at Austin from 1997 to 2000, arriving in John Mackovic's final season> He intended to play defensive tackle and even started three games at that position, but he was moved to the offensive line after Mack Brown was named the new head coach. He played left tackle in his last two years.

During his career, Davis blocked for three consecutive 1000-yard season rushers in Hodges Mitchell and twice for Heisman Trophy winner Ricky Williams, who set the college career rushing record. In 1998, he helped the Longhorn go to and with the Cotton Bowl and finish ranked 15/16/

He was second team All-Big 12 in his junior season and helped the Longhorns win the Big 12 South, go to the Big 12 Championship Game, return to the Cotton Bowl and finish ranked 21/23.

Prior to his senior year he was named a Playboy Preseason All-American and that year the Longhorns went to the 2000 Holiday Bowl, finishing the season ranked 12th. That season Davis was a first-team All-Big 12 selection, and a consensus first-team All-American. He was also a finalist for the Outland Trophy and a semifinalist for the Lombardi Award.

Following his senior year, he played in the East-West Shrine Bowl.

Davis was UT's fifth top-two pick in draft history and its first since Kenneth Sims went No. 1 in 1982.

In 2005, Davis was selected to the Big 12's 10th Anniversary Team.

He was named to the Longhorn Hall of Honor in 2016.

== Professional career ==
Pre-draft measurables
Height	Weight	40-yard dash	10-yard split	20-yard split	20-yard shuttle	Three-cone drill	Vertical jump	Broad jump	Bench press
6 ft 5 7/8 in (1.98 m)	370 lb (168 kg)	5.28 s	1.85 s	3.06 s	5.18 s	8.72 s	28.0 in (0.71 m)	8 ft 1 in (2.46 m)	33 reps
All values from NFL Combine

=== Arizona Cardinals ===
Davis was selected second overall in the 2001 NFL draft by the Arizona Cardinals, and was named the starter at right guard as a rookie. He came in 4th for the NFL AP Offensive Rookie of the Year at the end of the season. The next year injuries on the offensive line forced the team to move him to right tackle. He was moved back to guard in 2003.

In 2004, after Dennis Green was named the new head coach, he was moved to left tackle where he would remain for three seasons, even though he struggled at the position and was one of the highest penalized players in the league.

On February 17, 2007, the Cardinals told Davis that they would not name him a franchise or transition player, clearing him to become an unrestricted free agent.

=== Dallas Cowboys ===
On March 4, 2007, Davis signed with the Dallas Cowboys for a seven-year, $49.6 million contract with $18.75 million guaranteed, who were looking to replace the retired Marco Rivera. At the time, the contract was criticized in the media, for the amount of salary cap space being assigned to a player who would play guard and who had an average performance in previous years. According to Forbes, Davis was the highest-paid NFL player and 19th overall athlete in the 12-month period ending in June 2007, earning $25.4 million.

Davis was named the starter at right guard and would flourish in Dallas by going to the Pro Bowl in his first three seasons. He had an exceptional year in 2007, as he received Pro Bowl and All-Pro honors for the first time in his career. The Cowboys finished 13-3 and won the NFC East division, but suffered a disappointing first round playoff loss against the New York Giants (who would go on to win the Super Bowl).

In 2009, the Cowboys again won the division and also won their first playoff game in 13 seasons, but lost in the divisional round to the Minnesota Vikings.

In the 2010 season, Davis struggled and was even benched halfway through the game against Tennessee. His replacement injured his eye, Davis returned and didn't miss another snap all season. Nonetheless, he was released by the Cowboys the following July - after the lockout - to make salary camp room. At the time he left Dallas, he had started every game of the previous 5 seasons.

=== Detroit Lions ===
After his release by Dallas, Davis tried out with the Lions during the offseason, but did not make the roster. In October, he had a workout with the Titans.

On November 7, 2011, he signed a one-year deal with the Detroit Lions. After joining the team midway through the season, he was declared inactive for every game with the Lions and became a free agent when the season was over.

=== San Francisco 49ers ===
In the offseason, Davis had foot surgery and then visited the 49ers.

On July 26, 2012, Davis signed a one-year deal with the San Francisco 49ers as a free agent. He was a backup but played in all 16 games and all 3 playoff games that year, sometimes lining up as tight end. He played 13% of offensive snaps and 19% of special teams snaps that year. He helped the team reach Super Bowl XLVII. In the game, the last of his career, he played 6 plays on special teams and the 49ers fell to the Baltimore Ravens by a score of 34–31.

== Personal life ==
After retiring, Davis spent time as the bassist in the heavy metal band Free Reign with former Cowboys' teammates Marc Colombo and Cory Procter with guitarist Justin Chapman.

His older half-brother Charlie Davis played defensive tackle in the NFL and the USFL.

Davis started coaching football at Chandler High School in Chandler, Arizona in 2021.
