= Oakwood Independent School District =

School district in Texas, United States

Address
- 631 North Holly Street Oakwood, Texas, 75855; United States
- Coordinates: 31.5873°N 95.8530°W

District information
- Type: Public
- Grades: PK–12
- Schools: 2
- NCES District ID: 4833340

Students and staff
- Students: 221 (2023–2024)
- Teachers: 22.47 (on an FTE basis) (2023–2024)
- Staff: 27.38 (on an FTE basis) (2023–2024)
- Student–teacher ratio: 9.84 (2023–2024)

Other information
- Website: www.oakwoodisd.net

Oakwood Independent School District is a public school district based in Oakwood, Texas (USA).

The district has two campuses - Oakwood High (Grades 6-12) and Oakwood Elementary (Grades K-5).

== Academic achievement ==
In 2009, the school district was rated "academically acceptable" by the Texas Education Agency.

== Special programs ==
=== Athletics ===
Oakwood High School plays six-man football.

== See also ==
- List of school districts in Texas
