= Freestone, Texas =

Unincorporated community in Texas, US

Coordinates: 31°32′33″N 96°14′53″W

Freestone is an unincorporated community in Freestone County, in the U.S. state of Texas.

== History ==
Freestone was originally called Bond's Prairie, and under the latter name had its start in 1905 when the railroad was extended to that point. A post office called Freestone was established in 1906, and remained in operation until 1975.
