= Fairfield Independent School District =

School district in Texas

Location
- Freestone County, Texas, United States of America

Students and staff
- Students: 1,700

Fairfield Independent School District is an American school district in Texas with approximately 1,700 students. Its president is Eric Chavers.

== History ==
In 1964 the district received a portion of the Butler Independent School District which had only white students, while Fairfield ISD gave areas to Butler ISD that had only black students.

== Demographics ==
FISD encompasses an area of 456 square miles in Freestone County with approximately 1,700 students in EE-12. The school district is fully accredited by the Texas Education Agency , and 100% core classroom teachers are highly qualified according to NCLB. The curriculum is designed to meet the needs of all students with the latest in instructional technology available at each grade level. FISD offers above state base for teachers with a bachelor or a master's degree plus partial insurance benefits. Currently, FISD employs 258.7 staff members; 139.9 are full-time teachers. The average teacher salary is $52,291. The student population is approximately 0.4% Am. Indian, 0.9% Asian, 13.3% African American, 28.0% Hispanic, 53.4% White, 3.9% two or more; 63.6% are economically disadvantaged. Attendance is 96.4%.

== Instructional Programs ==
Instructional programs include regular education, special education, pre-kindergarten, compensatory, career and technology, English as a Second Language, dyslexia, gifted/talented, honors, advanced placement, agriculture, horticulture, consumer science, pre-nursing, dual credit courses, Read Right, Grand Central Station and extended year. Math and reading academies are offered in the summer to at-risk students. The campuses utilize many forms of modern technology with wireless connections.

== Achievements ==
FISD students engage in numerous UIL activities in 4A, winning 24 of the last 25 High School Academic UIL District and Spring Sweepstakes Championships, as well as numerous district, area, and state championships in respective contests. Some other extra-curricular activities include band, drama, cross-country, volleyball, football, basketball, track, softball, baseball, power lifting, tennis, golf, FCCLA, and FFA.

Fairfield High School has experienced much success in extra-curricular activities. In athletics, teams have advanced to the next level in cross country, football, volleyball, girls' and boys' basketball, softball and baseball. The Fairfield Eagles Football Team were 3A state contenders in 2013 and played at AT&T Stadium. Both the girls' and boys' basketball teams advanced to the Regional Tournament this last spring. The girls' cross-country team has won district for over ten times and advanced to state twice. The Fairfield FFA has excelled for many years winning both the fall and spring sweepstakes, and the Grand Band from Eagleland won five consecutive UIL sweepstakes. In the last ten years, FISD has had one state FFA President and two state FFA Vice-presidents, one FFCLA state officer, a FFA State Debate Winner and many State UIL Contestants. In 2020, the girls’ basketball team captured the Texas 4A state title at the Alamodome in San Antonio.

Both Fairfield Junior High and Fairfield Intermediate/Elementary have been UIL academic champs for the last several years!

== Navarro College ==
Navarro College offers year-round classes at Fairfield High School for undergraduate and graduate students. SFA, Texas A&M at Commerce, Tarleton, and University of Texas at Tyler place student teachers in the district.

== Financial and history ==
As of 1982, Fairfield Independent School District was the largest in Freestone County, having a 1978-1979 attendance of 1,300.

Fairfield approved a $12.5 million bond election to build a new EE-4 campus that was completed in June 2002. The community passed another $12.5 million bond in August 2002 to expand and improve the current high school facilities. The additions include an outstanding multi-media center, two modern science labs, two computer labs, a lecture room, a practice gym, and a competition gym. Students were able to enter the new expansion at the start of school in 2003. In the fall of 2007, football and band students competed on a new all-weather field turf surface at Eagle Field, and track competitors enjoyed a new resurfaced track.

In 2008, the citizens of Fairfield passed a $21 million bond for the construction of a new intermediate school. The new campus houses the district's 3rd through 5th graders. Completion of the new fully inclusive campus was the summer of 2010. The district was also excited to use part of the bond funds to construct an academic wing addition to the current high school. The classroom additions includes three state-of-the-art science labs, a computer lab and hands-on computer shop, two language labs, as well as an instructional classroom. Completion of the high school addition was the fall of 2009. The schools have approximately 3,600 households in the school district.

== Freestone-Navarro Bi-County Coop ==
Fairfield ISD business office also receives the superior performance title on the state's Financial Integrity Rating System of Texas (FIRST). Fairfield ISD is also the fiscal agent for the Freestone-Navarro Bi-County Coop which employs an additional 38 employees and includes nine neighboring school districts.

== TEA ==
Fairfield High School (2018–2019)
School Overview - 91/100 (based on the following)
Student Achievement - 93/100
School Progress - 91/100
Closing The Gaps - 87/100

Fairfield Junior High (2018–2019)
School Overview - 71/100 (based on the following)
Student Achievement - 75/100
School Progress - 72/100
Closing The Gaps - 60/100

Fairfield Intermediate (2018–2019)
School Overview - 72/100 (based on the following)
Student Achievement - 74/100
School Progress - 70/100
Closing The Gaps - 67/100

Fairfield Elementary (2018–2019)
This campus is paired with Fairfield Intermediate

== Board of trustees ==
President: Kevin Benedict
Vice President: John Fryer
Secretary: Kim Whitaker
Member: Eric Chavers
Member: Ashlee Daniel
Member: Penny Meredith
Member: Jeff Wright

== Administration ==
Superintendent: Joe Craig
Deputy Superintendent: Dr. Kelli Moore
Personnel Director: Lisa Tate
Finance Director: Sharon Gibson
Director of Student Services & Transportation Director: Rick Hartley
Child Nutrition Director: Crystal Thill
Maintenance Director: Logan Allcorn
Technology Director: Arland Thill
PEIMS Coordinator: Brandy McMillian
Finance/HR Specialist: Mandie Judd
Receptionist: Mary Ann Masiel
Police Chief: Billy Barlow
