= Dew, Texas =

- Unincorporated community
- Location within the state of Texas Dew (the United States)
- Coordinates: 31°35′43″N 96°08′24″W
- Country: United States
- State: Texas
- County: Freestone
- Time zone: UTC-6 (Central (CST))
  - Summer (DST): UTC-5 (CDT)
- Area codes: 903, 430
- GNIS feature ID: 1373396

Dew is an unincorporated community in southern Freestone County, Texas, United States. It is located at the junction of State Highway 75 and Farm to Market Road 489, nine miles south of Fairfield, the county seat.

Originally known as Avant or Avant Prairie, the area was first settled in the 1850s by pioneers from Alabama. It hosted a post office under the name "Avant" from 1853 through January 1885. In 1870, the settlement's name was changed to Sunshine after a local Methodist church. A post office was reestablished in December 1885 with the town renamed Dew. Locals requested the name "Drew" to honor a local resident, but the postal authorities misread the application.

The population of Dew peaked in 1947, when it was home to 195 residents. As of July 2006 approximately 70 people reside in Dew. The Dew Independent School District serves area students.
