= Fairfield, Texas =

- City
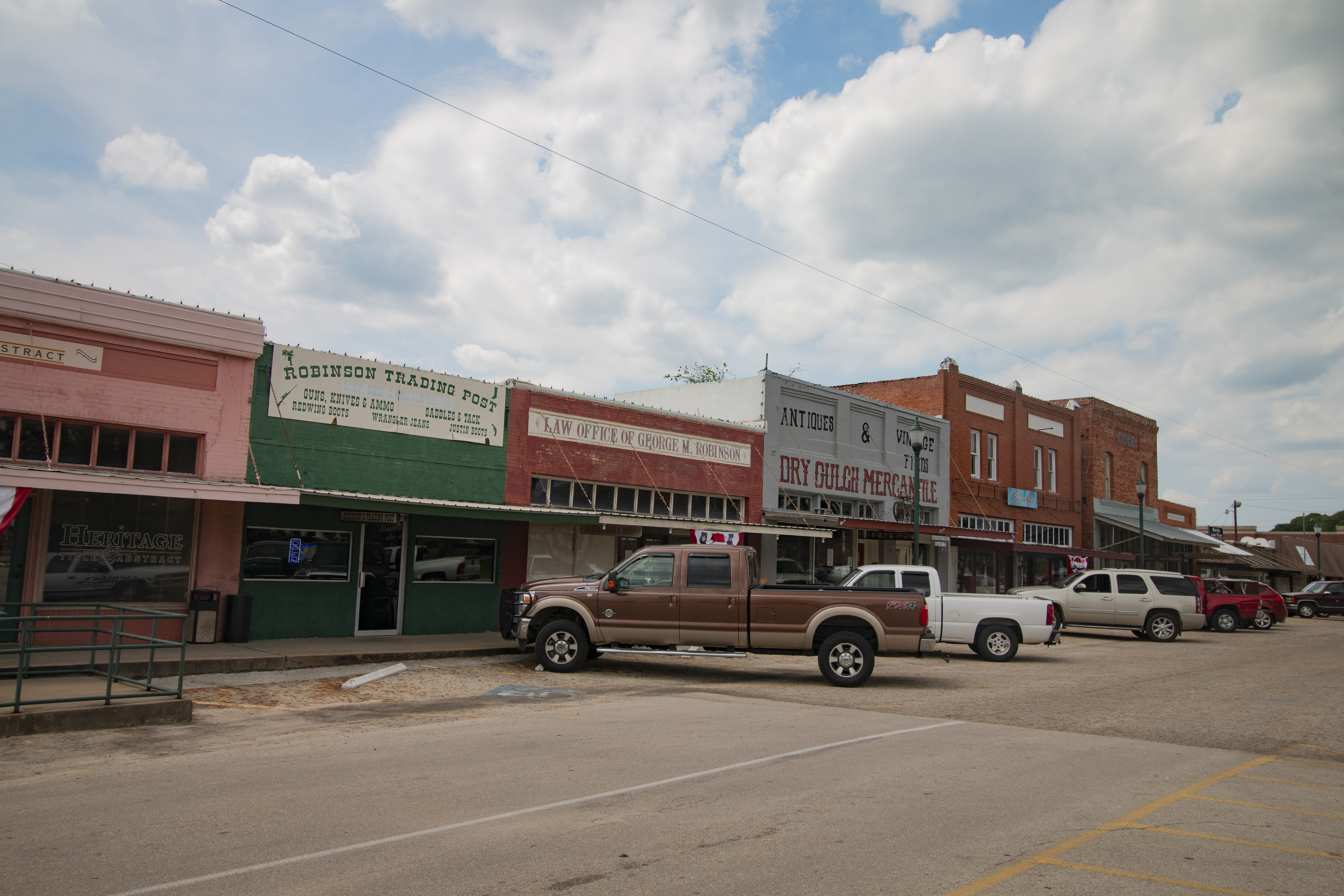
- Downtown Fairfield

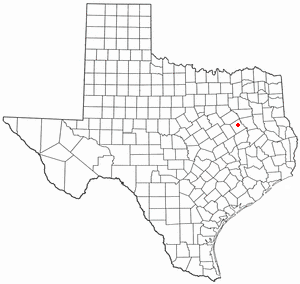
- Location of Fairfield, Texas

- Coordinates: 31°43′06″N 96°10′11″W
- Country: United States
- State: Texas
- County: Freestone

Area
  - Total: 5.46 sq mi (14.15 km^{2})
  - Land: 5.46 sq mi (14.14 km^{2})
  - Water: 0.0039 sq mi (0.01 km^{2})
- Elevation: 456 ft (139 m)

Population (2020)
  - Total: 2,850
  - Density: 529.8/sq mi (204.56/km^{2})
- Time zone: UTC-6 (Central (CST))
  - Summer (DST): UTC-5 (CDT)
- ZIP code: 75840
- Area code: 903/430
- FIPS code: 48-25104
- GNIS feature ID: 2410476
- Website: www.fairfieldtexas.com

Fairfield is a city and county seat of Freestone County, Texas, United States. The population was 2,850 at the 2020 census, down from 3,094 at the 2000 census. It was founded in 1851.

== Geography ==
Fairfield is located in the center of Freestone County. Interstate 45 passes through the west side of the city, leading north 88 miles (142 km) to Dallas and south 152 miles (245 km) to Houston. Access is from Exits 197 and 198. U.S. Route 84 runs directly through the city, leading east 35 miles (56 km) to Palestine and west 63 miles (101 km) to Waco. Texas State Highway 75 (Fairway) crosses US 84 at the west end of downtown, and leads northwest 14 miles (23 km) to Streetman and south 9 miles (14 km) to Dew.

According to the United States Census Bureau, the city has a total area of 5.4 square miles (14.1 km^{2}), of which 0.004 square miles (0.01 km^{2}), or 0.07%, is water.

=== Climate ===
The climate in this area is characterized by hot, humid summers and generally mild to cold winters. According to the Köppen Climate Classification system, Fairfield has a humid subtropical climate, abbreviated "Cfa" on climate maps.

== Demographics ==
Historical population
Census	Pop.	Note	%±
1860	609		—
1870	800		31.4%
1880	358		−55.2%
1890	499		39.4%
1940	1,047		—
1950	1,742		66.4%
1960	1,781		2.2%
1970	2,074		16.5%
1980	3,505		69.0%
1990	3,234		−7.7%
2000	3,094		−4.3%
2010	2,951		−4.6%
2020	2,850		−3.4%
U.S. Decennial Census

=== 2020 census ===
As of the 2020 census, Fairfield had a population of 2,850. The median age was 41.5 years, 23.7% of residents were under the age of 18, and 21.9% of residents were 65 years of age or older. For every 100 females there were 91.9 males, and for every 100 females age 18 and over there were 88.2 males.

0.0% of residents lived in urban areas, while 100.0% lived in rural areas.

There were 1,101 households in Fairfield, of which 33.6% had children under the age of 18 living in them. Of all households, 44.1% were married-couple households, 17.8% were households with a male householder and no spouse or partner present, and 34.2% were households with a female householder and no spouse or partner present. About 29.6% of all households were made up of individuals and 16.4% had someone living alone who was 65 years of age or older.

There were 1,320 housing units, of which 16.6% were vacant. The homeowner vacancy rate was 3.9% and the rental vacancy rate was 12.4%.

Racial composition as of the 2020 census
Race	Number	Percent
White	1,794	62.9%
Black or African American	594	20.8%
American Indian and Alaska Native	13	0.5%
Asian	29	1.0%
Native Hawaiian and Other Pacific Islander	0	0.0%
Some other race	217	7.6%
Two or more races	203	7.1%
Hispanic or Latino (of any race)	394	13.8%

=== 2000 census ===
As of the 2000 census, there were 3,094 people, 1,235 households, and 791 families living in the city. The population density was 685.6 inhabitants per square mile (264.7/km^{2}). There were 1,431 housing units at an average density of 317.1 per square mile (122.4/km^{2}). The racial makeup of the city was 71.46% White, 21.43% African American, 0.26% Native American, 0.68% Asian, 4.65% from other races, and 1.52% from two or more races. Hispanic or Latino of any race were 10.50% of the population.

There were 1,235 households, out of which 30.7% had children under the age of 18 living with them, 46.2% were married couples living together, 13.5% had a female householder with no husband present, and 35.9% were non-families. 32.7% of all households were made up of individuals, and 17.2% had someone living alone who was 65 years of age or older. The average household size was 2.41 and the average family size was 3.06.

In the city, the population was spread out, with 26.3% under the age of 18, 8.8% from 18 to 24, 25.9% from 25 to 44, 20.5% from 45 to 64, and 18.6% who were 65 years of age or older. The median age was 37 years. For every 100 females, there were 92.3 males. For every 100 females age 18 and over, there were 87.6 males.

The median income for a household in the city was $28,636, and the median income for a family was $40,871. Males had a median income of $29,643 versus $15,887 for females. The per capita income for the city was $16,308. About 14.1% of families and 18.2% of the population were below the poverty line, including 20.4% of those under age 18 and 22.8% of those age 65 or over.

== Notable people ==
- Laverne Brackens, quilt maker
- Tony Brackens, NFL player
- Louis Cheek, NFL player
- Kenny Dorham, jazz trumpeter
- Nanceen Perry, track runner, Olympian
- Larry Rose III, NFL, CFL, XFL player
- Winfred Tubbs, NFL player

== Education ==
The city is served by the Fairfield Independent School District.

Navarro College offers year-round classes at their Navarro College Career & Technical Center at Fairfield campus for undergraduate and graduate students.

== Gallery ==
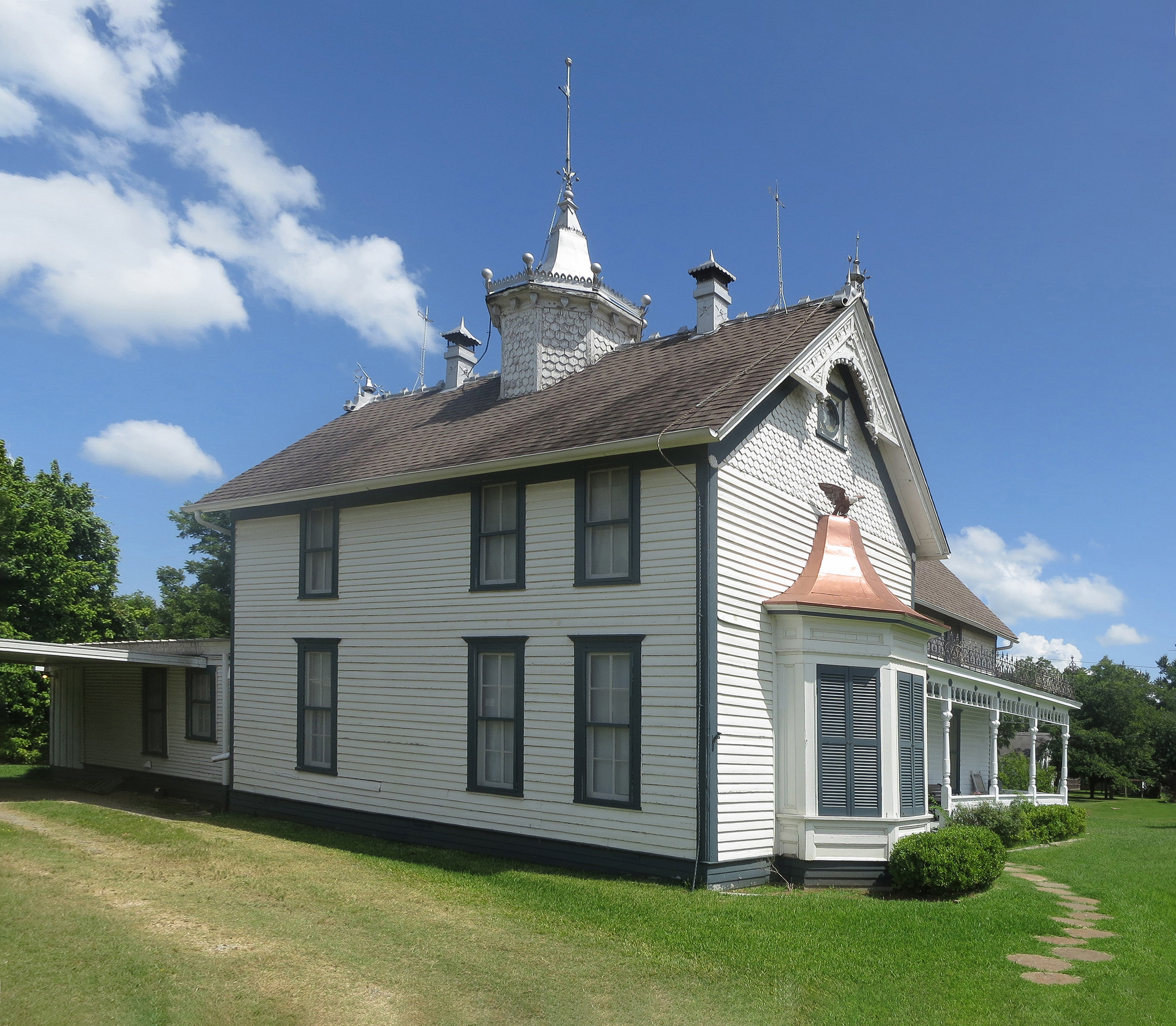
The Fridolin (Fred) Fischer Home

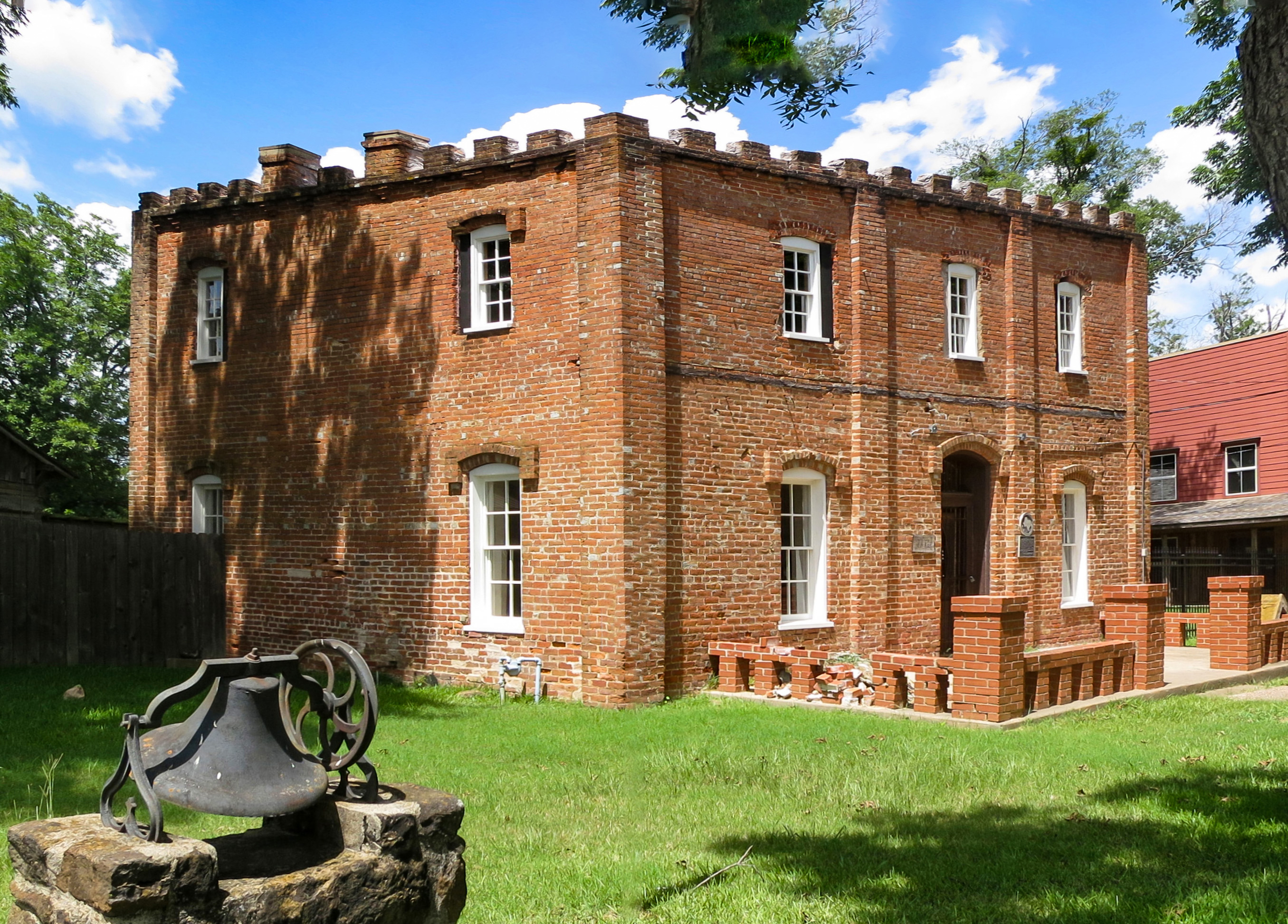
Old Freestone County Jail -- Fairfield, Texas

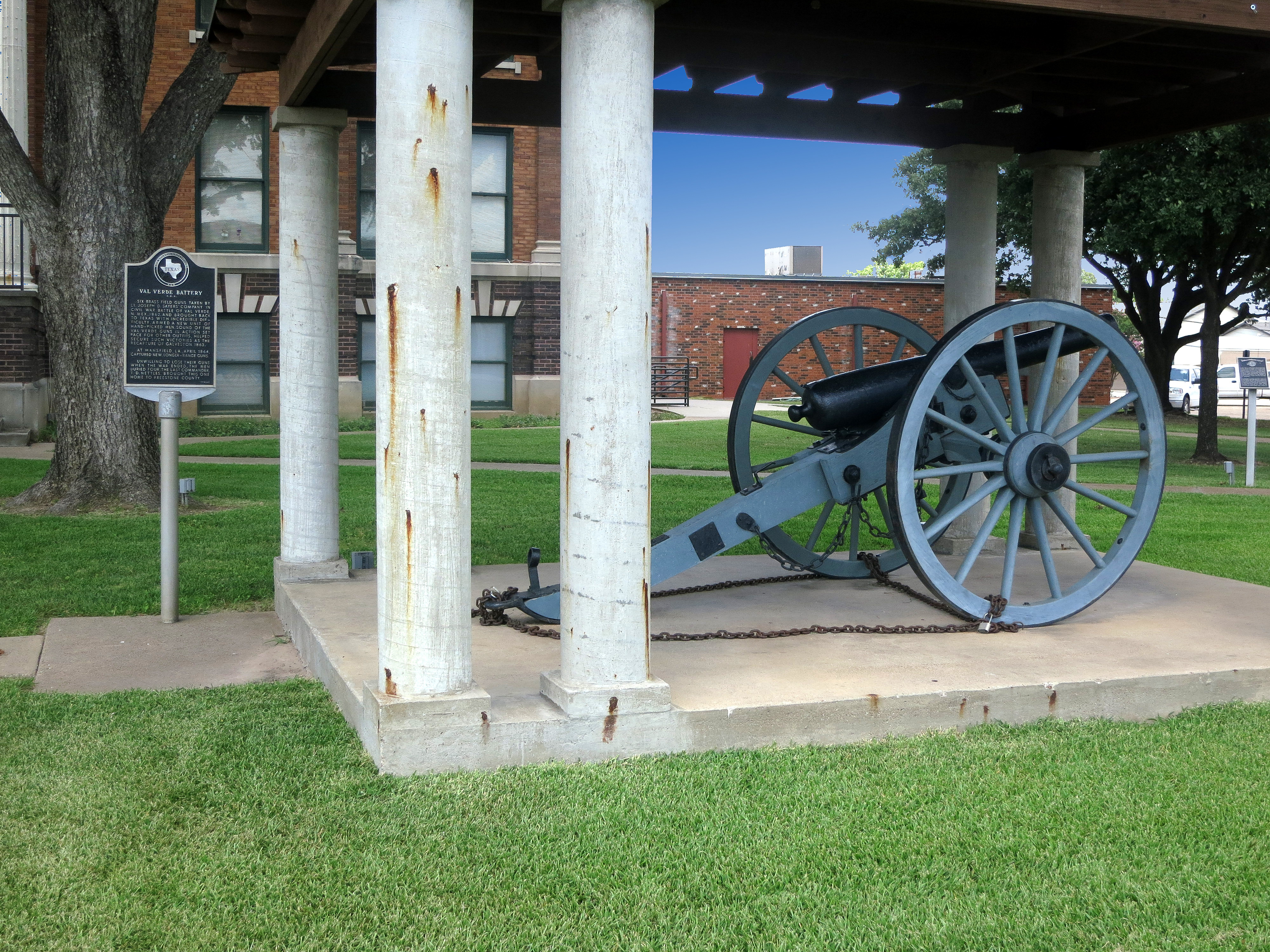
This cannon was taken at the Civil War battle of Val Verde. It is on the Freestone County Courthouse grounds.

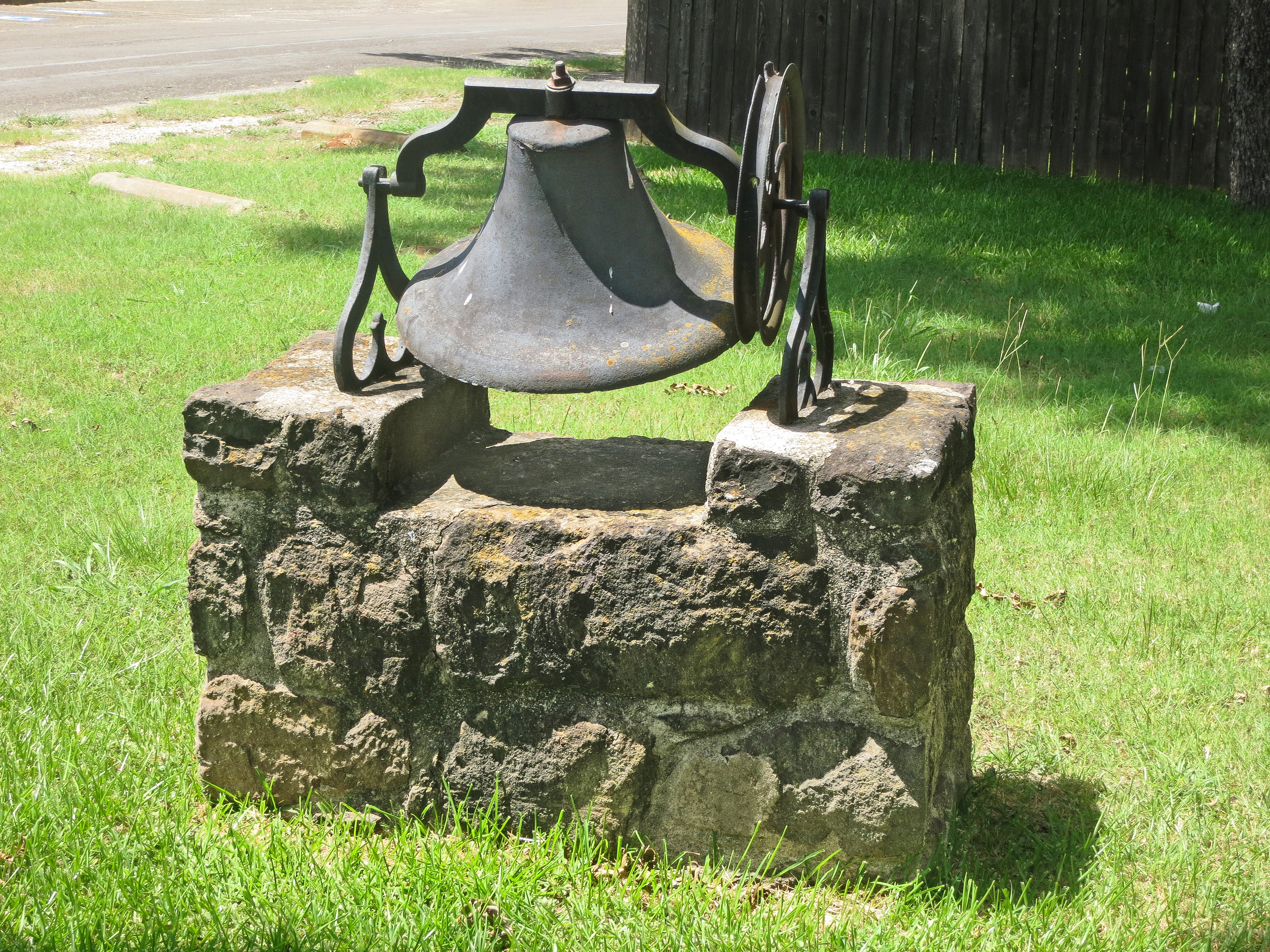
Butler Church Bell. From a sunken riverboat, to Butler Church then to become a historical bell.
