= List of Texas county seat name etymologies =

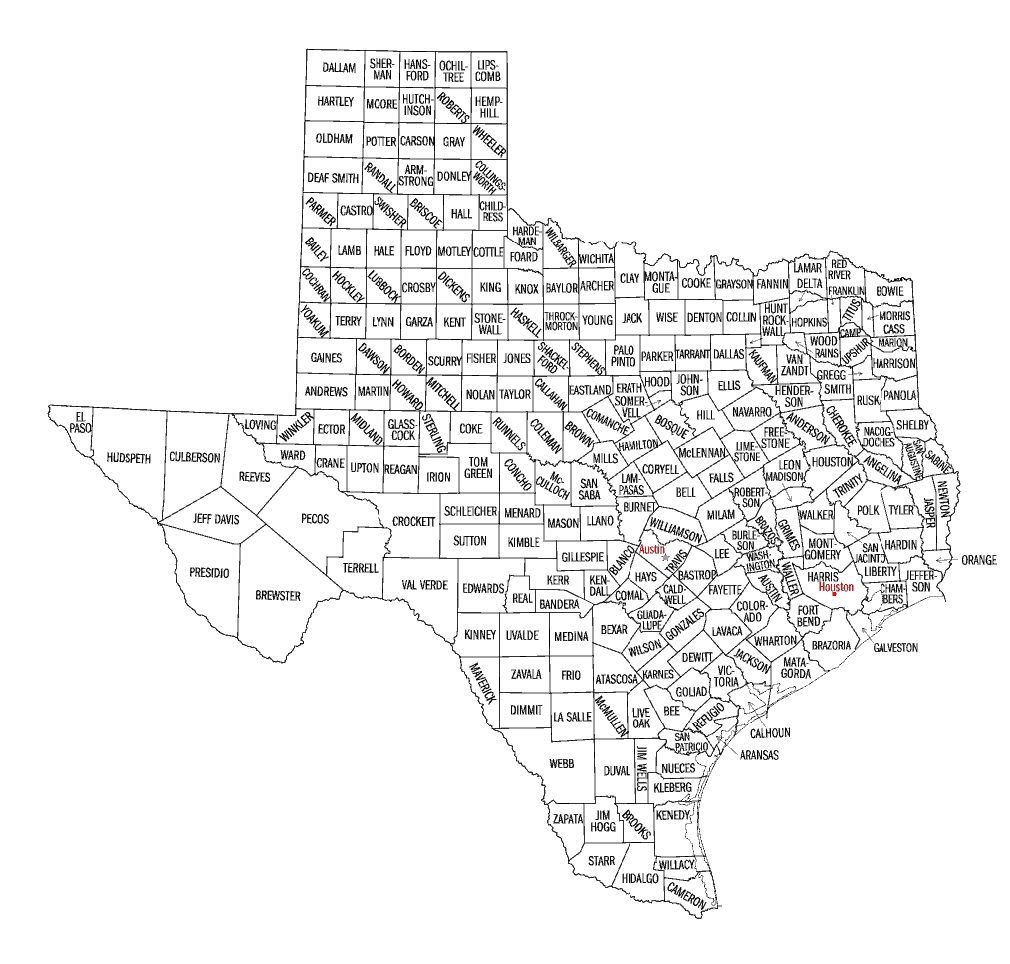
An enlargeable map of the 254 counties of the State of Texas

The following is a list of Texas county seat name etymologies, taken from the Handbook of Texas. A separate list of Texas county name etymologies, covering Texas counties instead of its county seats, is also available.

== A ==
County Seat	County	Named for
Abilene	Taylor	Abilene, Kansas, a famous cowtown
Albany	Shackelford	Albany, Georgia, the former home of an early settler
Alice	Jim Wells	Alice Gertrudis King Kleberg, the daughter of Richard King and wife of Robert Justus Kleberg III of the King Ranch
Alpine	Brewster	its location in mountainous West Texas
Amarillo	Potter	nearby Amarillo Lake and Amarillo Creek, in turn probably named for the yellow soil along their banks and shores (Amarillo is the Spanish word for yellow)
Anahuac	Chambers	the Anahuac region of Mexico, the ancient capital of the Aztecs
Anderson	Grimes	Kenneth Lewis Anderson, the last vice president of the Republic of Texas
Andrews	Andrews	Richard Andrews, the first Texan soldier to die in the Texas Revolution
Angleton	Brazoria	the wife of George W. Angle, a railroad official who had been prominent in making Velasco, Texas a deep-water port
Anson	Jones	Anson Jones, the last president of the Republic of Texas
Archer City	Archer	Branch Tanner Archer, a commissioner for the Republic of Texas
Aspermont	Stonewall	the Latin word for rough mountain
Athens	Henderson	Athens, Alabama by one of the early residents who came from there
Austin	Travis	Stephen F. Austin, who facilitated the Anglo American colonization of Texas and is known as the Father of Texas

== B ==
County Seat	County	Named for
Baird	Callahan	Matthew Baird, former owner of the Baldwin Locomotive Works
Ballinger	Runnels	William Pitt Ballinger, a Galveston attorney and railroad stockholder
Bandera	Bandera	Bandera Pass, named in turn for the Spanish word for flag
Bastrop	Bastrop	Felipe Enrique Neri, Baron de Bastrop, an early German settler
Bay City	Matagorda	its location on Bay Prairie
Beaumont	Jefferson	Jefferson Beaumont, brother-in-law of founder and Texas hero Henry Millard
Beeville	Bee	Barnard Elliott Bee, Sr., a secretary of state of the Republic of Texas
Bellville	Austin	Thomas B. Bell, one of the Old Three Hundred
Belton	Bell	its location in Bell County
Benjamin	Knox	Benjamin Bedford, a lightning victim and the son of Hilory H. Bedford, a president and controlling stockholder in the Wichita and Brazos Stock Company
Big Lake	Reagan	nearby Big Lake (which is usually dry in most years as it is located in arid West Texas)
Big Spring	Howard	nearby "big spring" in Sulphur Draw (a popular and often fought for location in arid West Texas; the spring remains active to this day and is now part of a local park)
Boerne	Kendall	Ludwig Boerne, a German author and publicist
Bonham	Fannin	James Butler Bonham, who died at the Alamo (ironically, Fannin County is named for the commander whose help Bonham enlisted to aid at the Alamo)
Boston	Bowie	Old Boston, Texas, named for store-owner W. J. Boston
Brackettville	Kinney	Oscar Bernadotte Brackett, an early merchant in the region
Brady	McCulloch	Brady Creek, which runs through the town
Breckenridge	Stephens	John Cabell Breckinridge, the fourteenth vice president of the United States (note the change in spelling)
Brenham	Washington	Richard Fox Brenham, a soldier in the Texas Revolution who had practiced medicine in the vicinity
Brownfield	Terry	a prominent ranching family in the area
Brownsville	Cameron	Fort Brown, named in turn for Major Jacob Brown, who died during an attack on the fort in the Mexican–American War
Brownwood	Brown	Henry Stevenson Brown, a commander at the Battle of Velasco
Bryan	Brazos	William Joel Bryan, a nephew of Stephen Fuller Austin who donated land for the town
Burnet	Burnet	David G. Burnet, president of the Republic of Texas

== C ==
County Seat	County	Named for
Caldwell	Burleson	Mathew Caldwell, a signer of the Texas Declaration of Independence and soldier during the Texas Revolution
Cameron	Milam	Ewen Cameron, a soldier during the Texas Revolution
Canadian	Hemphill	Its location on the Canadian River
Canton	Van Zandt	Old Canton, Texas, in neighboring Smith County
Canyon	Randall	Nearby Palo Duro Canyon
Carrizo Springs	Dimmit	The nearby springs
Carthage	Panola	Carthage, Mississippi
Center	Shelby	Its location in the center of Shelby County (the town and county, though, are near the Louisiana border in East Texas)
Centerville	Leon	Its location in the center of Leon County (coincidentally, the town is also located almost midway between Dallas and Houston)
Channing	Hartley	George Channing Rivers, the paymaster of the railroad when it built through the area
Childress	Childress	George Campbell Childress, the chairman of the committee which authored the Texas Declaration of Independence
Clarendon	Donley	Clara Sully Carhart, wife of the founder (& possible homage to the Earls of Clarendon)
Clarksville	Red River	James Clark, the founder of the town
Claude	Armstrong	Claude Ayers, the engineer of the first train to travel through the area
Cleburne	Johnson	Patrick Ronayne Cleburne, a Confederate general in the Civil War
Coldspring	San Jacinto	The cold springwater found at the location
Coleman	Coleman	Its location in Coleman County, which was named for Robert M. Coleman, a signer of the Texas Declaration of Independence and soldier at the Battle of San Jacinto.
Colorado City	Mitchell	Its location on the Colorado River
Columbus	Colorado	Columbus, Ohio
Comanche	Comanche	Its location in Comanche County, which was named for the Comanche indians
Conroe	Montgomery	Isaac Conroe, the first postmaster of the town
Cooper	Delta	L. W. Cooper, a supporter of the bill creating Delta County
Corpus Christi	Nueces	Nearby Corpus Christi Bay, discovered by Spanish explorer Alvarez de Pineda on the Catholic Feast of Corpus Christi (Latin: "Body of Christ")
Corsicana	Navarro	The island of Corsica, birthplace of the parents of José Antonio Navarro, the namesake of Navarro County
Cotulla	La Salle	Joseph Cotulla, the developer of the town
Crane	Crane	William Carey Crane, a past president of the Baylor University
Crockett	Houston	Davy Crockett, former Tennessee member of Congress and defender of the Alamo
Crosbyton	Crosby	Stephen Crosby, former commissioner of the Texas General Land Office
Crowell	Foard	George T. Crowell, owner of the townsite
Crystal City	Zavala	The clear artesian water of the area
Cuero	DeWitt	Spanish word for "hide" or "leather:" cattle was (and still is) a major component of the local economy

== D ==
County Seat	County	Named for
Daingerfield	Morris	Captain London Daingerfield, who was killed in an 1830 battle with Indians on the site that became the town in the 1840s
Dalhart	Dallam	Its location on the border between Dallam and Hartley counties
Dallas	Dallas	Uncertain: the primary report is that founder John Neely Bryan named it for his "good friend Dallas." This person is variously reported as 1) George Mifflin Dallas, the eleventh vice president of the United States; 2) his brother, Alexander Junior, an American commodore; 3) their father, Alexander Senior, United States Secretary of the Treasury around the end of the War of 1812; or 4) some other person named Dallas whose identity is uncertain. Additionally, another report has the town being named Dallas as the result of a town-naming contest in 1842.
Decatur	Wise	Stephen Decatur, a Revolutionary War naval hero
Del Rio	Val Verde	Its location on the Rio Grande
Denton	Denton	Methodist preacher and Indian fighter John Bunyan Denton, who was killed in 1841 at the Battle of Village Creek
Dickens	Dickens	Its location in Dickens County, which was named for a J. Dickens who fought in the Battle of the Alamo
Dimmitt	Castro	W. C. Dimmitt, a land owner and developer
Dumas	Moore	Louis Dumas, president of the Panhandle Townsite Company in Sherman

== E ==
County Seat	County	Named for
Eagle Pass	Maverick	A ford called El Paso del Águila from eagles who nested in a grove beside the mouth of the nearby Río Escondido
Eastland	Eastland	Its location in Eastland County
Edinburg	Hidalgo	Settler John Young's hometown of Edinburgh, Scotland
Edna	Jackson	A daughter of Count Joseph Telfener, an Italian entrepreneur who was building a railroad from Richmond, Texas, to Brownsville
El Paso	El Paso	El Paso del Norte, "The North Pass," the former Spanish name of nearby modern Ciudad Juarez, Mexico
Eldorado	Schleicher	The mythical city of El Dorado
Emory	Rains	Rains County, which was named for Emory Rains, an early legislator and surveyor of the area

== F ==
County Seat	County	Named for
Fairfield	Freestone	Unknown.
Falfurrias	Brooks	La Mota de Falfurrias, the grove of trees where Edward Lasater established a ranch
Farwell	Parmer	John V. Farwell, a Chicago merchant and a principal in the Capitol Syndicate, which built the present Texas State Capitol and owned the gigantic XIT Ranch
Floresville	Wilson	Canary Islands immigrant Don Francisco Flores de Abrego, who established a ranch in the area
Floydada	Floyd	Uncertain: The town was originally named Floyd City but was required to change it to avoid confusion with Floyd in Hunt County. The new name may have been created from garbling an intended "Floydalia" on the telegraph to Washington or by the addition of either donor James Price or his wife Caroline's mother Ada to the existing name.
Fort Davis	Jeff Davis	Fort Davis, which was named for Confederate president Jefferson Davis
Fort Stockton	Pecos	Camp Stockton, which was named in honor of Captain Robert Stockton, a prominent navy officer in the Mexican War
Fort Worth	Tarrant	Fort Worth, which was named for William Jenkins Worth, a general in the Mexican–American War
Franklin	Robertson	Old Franklin, the prior county seat, which was named for settler Francis Slauter, who had owned the land on which it was located
Fredericksburg	Gillespie	Prince Frederick of Prussia

== G ==
County Seat	County	Named for
Gail	Borden	Gail Borden, Jr., businessman, publisher, surveyor, and inventor of condensed milk
Gainesville	Cooke	United States General Edmund Pendleton Gaines, a sympathizer of the Texas Revolution
Galveston	Galveston	Bernardo de Gálvez, a Spanish governor of the Louisiana Territory and an ally of the United States during the American Revolution
Garden City	Glasscock	Old Garden City, which had been intended to be Gardner City after a local store owner but was misnamed due to typographical error
Gatesville	Coryell	Nearby Fort Gates on the Leon River, which was named after Bvt. MJ. Collinson Reed Gates, a hero of the Mexican War
George West	Live Oak	George Washington West, a rancher who founded the town, paid the railroad to build through it, and paid to build the courthouse after county voters approved moving the county seat
Georgetown	Williamson	George Washington Glasscock, soldier of the Texan Revolution and politician, who donated the land for the site
Giddings	Lee	Uncertain: Most likely railroad official Jabez Deming Giddings, but possibly his brother, the politician Dewitt Clinton Giddings
Gilmer	Upshur	Captain Thomas W. Gilmer, United States Secretary of the Navy, who was killed along with county namesake Abel Parker Upshur when a new naval gun exploded during a demonstration aboard the USS Princeton on the Potomac.
Glen Rose	Somervell	An inversion of the original Rose Glen, selected by the wife of donor T.C. Jordan as a reminder of her native Scotland
Goldthwaite	Mills	Joe G. Goldthwaite, railroad official for the Gulf, Colorado and Santa Fe Railway who auctioned the town lots
Goliad	Goliad	An anagram of the name of Mexican hero Father Miguel Hidalgo
Gonzales	Gonzales	Rafael Gonzales, governor of Coahuila y Tejas
Graham	Young	Gustavus A. and Edwin S. Graham, early settlers in the area
Granbury	Hood	Hiram B. Granbury, Confederate General
Greenville	Hunt	Thomas J. Green, a general in the Texas Army in the war for independence from Mexico and, later, a member of the Congress of the Republic of Texas
Groesbeck	Limestone	Abram Groesbeeck, a director of the Houston and Texas Central Railway
Groveton	Trinity	A grove of blackjack trees situated between the town and the nearby lumber mill
Guthrie	King	W.H. Guthrie of Kentucky, a major stockholder of the Louisville Land and Cattle Company which owned much of the surrounding area

== H ==
County Seat	County	Named for
Hallettsville	Lavaca	Settler, widow, and donor Margaret L. Hallett
Hamilton	Hamilton	James Hamilton, Jr., the former governor of South Carolina who gave financial aid to the Republic of Texas
Haskell	Haskell	Charles Ready Haskell, a soldier killed in the Goliad massacre
Hebbronville	Jim Hogg	James Richard Hebbron, a local rancher, who donated land for the town's railroad station.
Hemphill	Sabine	John Hemphill, an early Texas judge and legal scholar, and later a United States senator
Hempstead	Waller	Dr. G.S.B. Hempstead of Portsmouth, Ohio, brother-in-law of town co-founder Dr. Richard Rodgers Peebles
Henderson	Rusk	James Pinckney Henderson, the first governor of Texas
Henrietta	Clay	Uncertain: The law creating Clay County stated the county seat must be named Henrietta. One theory is that Henrietta was intended as the feminized form of county namesake Henry Clay.
Hereford	Deaf Smith	The Hereford cattle brought to the area by early ranchers
Hillsboro	Hill	George Washington Hill, Republic of Texas Secretary of War and Marine, surgeon, and early settler of the area
Hondo	Medina	Named for the nearby Hondo Creek. Hondo in Spanish means deep.
Houston	Harris	General Sam Houston, commander at the Battle of San Jacinto, and later President of the Republic of Texas and Governor and Senator for the state of Texas
Huntsville	Walker	Postmaster Ephraim Gray's hometown of Huntsville, Alabama

== J ==
County Seat	County	Named for
Jacksboro	Jack	Patrick Churchill Jack, attorney and early Texas colonist, and his brother William Houston Jack, both veterans of the Texas Revolution who founded the city and for whom the county is also named
Jasper	Jasper	William Jasper, a Revolutionary War hero
Jayton	Kent	the Jay family, early ranchers in the area
Jefferson	Marion	Thomas Jefferson
Johnson City	Blanco	James Polk Johnson, early settler and the nephew of Lyndon Baines Johnson's grandfather.
Jourdanton	Atascosa	Jourdan Campbell, owner of a local ranch, who lent his name to the city.
Junction	Kimble	its location at the confluence of the North and South Llano Rivers

== K ==
County Seat	County	Named for
Karnes City	Karnes	Henry Wax Karnes, a soldier in the Texas Revolution (The "City" was added to avoid confusion with Kerens)
Kaufman	Kaufman	David Spangler Kaufman, a Jewish state senator and the second Jewish member of the United States House of Representatives
Kermit	Winkler	Kermit Roosevelt, younger son of President Theodore Roosevelt. Kermit had visited the county to hunt antelope a few months before the town was named.
Kerrville	Kerr	James Kerr, a Republic of Texas congressman
Kingsville	Kleberg	Richard King, establisher of the King Ranch
Kountze	Hardin	Herman and Augustus Kountze, financial backers of the Sabine and East Texas Railroad

== L ==
County Seat	County	Named for
La Grange	Fayette	The name of the former home of General Lafayette, the Revolutionary War hero for whom Fayette County is named
Lamesa	Dawson	Selected in place of the grammatically correct La Mesa, so called due to flatness of surrounding region.
Lampasas	Lampasas	The nearby Lampasas River, which was possibly named for Lampazos, Mexico
Laredo	Webb	Laredo, Spain
Leakey	Real	John Leakey, an early settler in the area
Levelland	Hockley	The level topography of the surrounding South Plains
Liberty	Liberty	Uncertain. The town was originally platted as Villa de la Santísima Trinidad de la Libertad, "Town of the Most Holy Trinity at Liberty," in reference to its position on the Trinity and the recent success of the Mexican War of Independence. The mostly Anglo settlers quickly renamed it to Liberty, which is variously explained as a simple Anglicization of the Spanish name or as an homage to their hometown of Liberty, Mississippi.
Linden	Cass	Uncertain, but reportedly named after the former home of a Tennesseean immigrant
Lipscomb	Lipscomb	Judge Abner Smith Lipscomb, a Texian Secretary of State
Littlefield	Lamb	George W. Littlefield, local ranch owner and town founder
Livingston	Polk	Livingston, Tennessee, hometown of founder Moses L. Choate
Llano	Llano	The nearby Llano River, which was named for the surrounding plains
Lockhart	Caldwell	Byrd Lockhart, an assistant surveyor and reportedly the first Anglo to set foot in the county
Longview	Gregg	Supposedly, for the impressive view railroad management could see from the house of Ossamus Hitch Methvin, Sr., who sold them the land for the town. Possibly ironic, given the town's location in heavily forested East Texas.
Lubbock	Lubbock	Thomas Saltus Lubbock, a former Texas Ranger (some sources have Lubbock's first name as Thompson)
Lufkin	Angelina	Abraham P. Lufkin, a cotton merchant and Galveston city councilman, who was the son-in-law of Paul Bremond, president of the Houston, East and West Texas Railway which developed the town

== M ==
County Seat	County	Named for
Madisonville	Madison	James Madison, fourth President of the United States
Marfa	Presidio	Uncertain, though reportedly suggested by the wife of a railroad executive from a character in Fyodor Dostoyevsky's novel The Brothers Karamazov, which she was reading at the time
Marlin	Falls	John Marlin, pioneer and father-in-law of town founder Samuel A. Blain
Marshall	Harrison	John Marshall, fourth Chief Justice of the United States Supreme Court
Mason	Mason	Fort Mason, whose etymology is uncertain, though it was probably named after either Lt. George T. Mason, killed during the Mexican–American War at Brownsville, Texas, or for Gen. Richard Barnes Mason.
Matador	Motley	The Matador Ranch, which was located in the county
McKinney	Collin	Collin McKinney, one of five drafters and the oldest signer of the Texas Declaration of Independence, and early settler in the county
Memphis	Hall	Following a series of failures for the town to select a name not already in use, Rev. John Brice fortuitously noticed a letter in Austin addressed to Memphis, Texas, and marked No such town in Texas
Menard	Menard	Michel Branamour Menard, the founder of Galveston, Texas
Mentone	Loving	Old Mentone, which was named for Menton, France, the hometown of one of its early settlers
Meridian	Bosque	Uncertain, though most likely due to Commissioner Jasper N. Mabray's belief the town lay on or near the 98th meridian west. Surveyor George Erath had previously named Meridian Creek and Meridian Knobs for such a proximity.
Mertzon	Irion	M. L. Mertz, a director of the Kansas City, Mexico and Orient Railway
Miami	Roberts	Uncertain: Reportedly an Indian word meaning "sweetheart," but could also be named for rivers or other cities named after the Miami Indians
Midland	Midland	Its location midway between Fort Worth and El Paso on the Texas and Pacific Railway
Monahans	Ward	Thomas John Monahan, who dug the first water well between the Pecos River and Big Spring in 1881 and selected the site for a water tank
Montague	Montague	Daniel Montague, a state senator and early surveyor
Morton	Cochran	Morton Smith, a land agent hired to sell the property after the death of the original landowner
Mount Pleasant	Titus	A nearby Caddo burial site known as "Pleasant Mound"
Mount Vernon	Franklin	Mount Vernon, George Washington's homestead
Muleshoe	Bailey	The nearby Muleshoe Ranch

== N ==
County Seat	County	Named for
Nacogdoches	Nacogdoches	The Nacogdoche Indians
New Braunfels	Comal	Braunfels, Germany, hometown of German nobleman Prince Carl of Solms-Braunfels, commissioner general of the Adelsverein Society, whose German immigrants settled the area
Newton	Newton	John Newton, a veteran of the Revolutionary War under the "Swamp Fox" Francis Marion whose exploits were retold (and likely embellished) by Parson Weems

== O ==
County Seat	County	Named for
Odessa	Ector	Reportedly named by railroad workers from Ukraine who ironically named the flat, dry, and treeless town after their very much different hometown
Orange	Orange	Named for Orange County, which was named for an orange grove owned by George Patillo
Ozona	Crockett	The quantity of ozone in the local air

== P ==
County Seat	County	Named for
Paducah	Cottle	Paducah, Kentucky, the home of an early settler
Panhandle	Carson	Its location in the Texas Panhandle
Paint Rock	Concho	Native American pictographs discovered nearby
Palo Pinto	Palo Pinto	Palo Pinto County
Palestine	Anderson	Palestine, Illinois, the home of an early settler
Pampa	Gray	The Argentine pampas, which George Tyng, manager of the local White Deer Land Company, stated the area resembled
Paris	Lamar	Paris, France
Pearsall	Frio	Thomas W. Pearsall, vice president of the railroad
Pecos	Reeves	Nearby Pecos River, which was named for the Pecos Pueblo, which is of unknown etymology
Perryton	Ochiltree	George M. Perry, an early county judge
Pittsburg	Camp	Major William H. Pitts, who settled the tract of land which eventually became the town
Plains	Yoakum	Unknown, but most likely for the surrounding South Plains
Plainview	Hale	The unobstructed view of the surrounding South Plains
Port Lavaca	Calhoun	Nearby Lavaca Bay, which was named for the Lavaca River, which is the Spanish translation of the original French Rivière de Les Veches, so called because La Salle found so many bison along its shore during his expedition
Post	Garza	Founder C. W. Post, the cereal magnate who attempted to develop the town as a Utopian community

== Q ==
County Seat	County	Named for
Quanah	Hardeman	Quanah Parker, the last Comanche Indian chief
Quitman	Wood	Governor John Anthony Quitman of Mississippi, who also served as a soldier in the Mexican War and proposed a filibuster expedition to Cuba

== R ==
County Seat	County	Named for
Rankin	Upton	Frederick Harrison Rankin, one of Stephen F. Austin's original Old Three Hundred settlers
Raymondville	Willacy	Edward Burleson Raymond, a former foreman of a division of the King Ranch
Refugio	Refugio	The Spanish mission Nuestra Señora del Refugio, "Our Lady of Refuge," which was moved to the site after failed establishments elsewhere
Richmond	Fort Bend	Richmond, North Yorkshire, England
Rio Grande City	Starr	Nearby Rio Grande
Robert Lee	Coke	Confederate General Robert E. Lee
Roby	Fisher	M. L. and D. C. Roby, developers from Mississippi
Rockport	Aransas	The rock ledge underneath its shore along the Gulf of Mexico
Rocksprings	Edwards	Springs bubbling from nearby rocks
Rockwall	Rockwall	A stone wall discovered beneath the new town site in 1851
Rusk	Cherokee	Thomas Jefferson Rusk, Texan Secretary of War

== S ==
County Seat	County	Named for
San Angelo	Tom Green	Named San Angela by founder Bartholomew DeWitt after an unknown woman named Angela, possibly a nun sister-in-law or a wife Carolina Angela. Emended to San Angelo after the postal service complained of the ungrammatical construction.
San Antonio	Bexar	Named for the San Antonio River, discovered on the Catholic Feast of Saint Anthony of Padua
San Augustine	San Augustine	Uncertain, but most likely for Saint Augustine of Hippo
San Diego	Duval	Nearby San Diego Creek, presumably named after Saint Didacus of Alcalá
San Marcos	Hays	Nearby San Marcos River, mistakenly named for original San Marcos (probably either the current Colorado or Navidad), which was discovered on the Catholic Feast of Saint Mark the Evangelist
San Saba	San Saba	Nearby San Saba River, which was discovered on the Catholic Feast of Saint Sabbas the Sanctified
Sanderson	Terrell	Thomas P. Sanderson, a construction engineer
Sarita	Kenedy	Sarita Kenedy, daughter of ranch owner John Gregory Kenedy, Sr., and granddaughter of Mifflin Kenedy
Seminole	Gaines	Nearby Seminole watering holes
Seguin	Guadalupe	Juan Seguín, Tejano soldier in the Texan Revolution
Seymour	Baylor	Uncertain: The most common version is the name was chosen to honor a local cowboy named Seymour Munday, but other versions report that the name was simply chosen by settler J.W. Fullock or that it was selected to honor New York Governor Horatio Seymour.
Sherman	Grayson	General Sidney Sherman, hero of the Texas Revolution and man credited with the battle cry "Remember the Alamo!"
Sierra Blanca	Hudspeth	Nearby Sierra Blanca Mountain
Silverton	Briscoe	Named by founder Thomas J. Braidfoot.
Sinton	San Patricio	A major stock-holder in the Coleman-Fulton Pasture Company
Snyder	Scurry	William Henry Snyder, a merchant and buffalo hunter who operated a trading post in the area
Sonora	Sutton	Sonora, Mexico, hometown of a family servant of landowner Charles G. Adams
Spearman	Hansford	Railroad executive Thomas E. Spearman
Stanton	Martin	Supreme Court Justice Edwin McMasters Stanton
Stephenville	Erath	Landowner John M. Stephens
Sterling City	Sterling	W.S. Sterling, an early settler
Stinnett	Hutchinson	Albert Sidney Stinnett of Amarillo, who helped purchase the right-of-way for the railroad
Stratford	Sherman	Stratford Hall Plantation, the Virginia boyhood home of Confederate General Robert E. Lee
Sulphur Springs	Hopkins	Nearby sulphur springs
Sweetwater	Nolan	Nearby Sweetwater Creek

== T ==
County Seat	County	Named for
Tahoka	Lynn	Unknown.
Throckmorton	Throckmorton	Throckmorton County, which was named for settler William E. Throckmorton, father of Texas Senator and Governor James W. Throckmorton
Tilden	McMullen	Samuel J. Tilden, Democratic presidential candidate and victim of the Compromise of 1877
Tulia	Swisher	Nearby Tule Creek
Tyler	Smith	American President John Tyler

== U ==
County Seat	County	Named for
Uvalde	Uvalde	Nearby Cañon de Ugalde, the site of a victory by Spanish governor Juan de Ugalde over the Apache, which was renamed in his honor

== V ==
County Seat	County	Named for
Van Horn	Culberson	Union Army Major Jefferson Van Horne
Vega	Oldham	The Spanish word for meadow.
Vernon	Wilbarger	Mount Vernon, Virginia, George Washington's homestead
Victoria	Victoria	Mexican hero and president Guadalupe Victoria

== W ==
County Seat	County	Named for
Waco	McLennan	The Waco (Spanish: Hueco) band of the Wichita Indians, who established a village near the modern city
Waxahachie	Ellis	Nearby Waxahachie Creek, supposedly an Indian name meaning "Buffalo Creek"
Weatherford	Parker	Jefferson Weatherford, a Texas state senator for Parker County
Wellington	Collingsworth	The Duke of Wellington (The nearby Rocking Chair Ranch was partially owned by a relative of the Earl of Aberdeen, who had been with the duke at the Battle of Waterloo)
Wharton	Wharton	John Wharton and his brother William Wharton, two leaders of the Texas Revolution
Wheeler	Wheeler	Royal Tyler Wheeler, a chief justice of the Texas Supreme Court
Wichita Falls	Wichita	A series of falls formerly located on the Wichita River, before being destroyed by a flood in 1886
Woodville	Tyler	George T. Wood, the governor of Texas who introduced the bill to establish the county (coincidentally, the city is located in heavily forested East Texas where the timber industry is a major employer)

== Z ==
County Seat	County	Named for
Zapata	Zapata	Mexican Colonel Antonio Zapata, a ranch owner and military leader involved in the failed Republic of the Rio Grande

== Sources ==
- Handbook of Texas Online.
