= T15 =

T15 or T-15 may refer to:

== Aerospace ==
- T15 (satellite), a DirecTV communications satellite
- Marlin Airport, Texas, United States
- Slingsby T.15 Gull III, a British glider
- Soyuz T-15, a crewed spaceflight

== Automobiles ==
- Chery T15, a Chinese concept car
- Cooper T15, a British Formula Three racing car: see Cooper Mk.V
- Simca-Gordini T15, a French racing car
- Triumph T15 Terrier, a motorcycle

== Railway stations ==
- Minami-Sunamachi Station, Tokyo, Japan
- Nangō-Jūsan-Chōme Station, Sapporo, Hokkaido, Japan
- Nijō Station (Kyoto), Japan
- Sanuki-Tsuda Station, Kagawa, Japan
- Sekime-Takadono Station, Osaka, Japan
- Yagoto Station, Nagoya, Aichi, Japan

== Weapons and armour ==
- Safir T-15, a rifle
- Škoda T-15, a prototype German-Czechoslovak light tank
- T-15 torpedo, a Soviet nuclear torpedo
- T-15 Armata, a Russian infantry fighting vehicle
- Vickers T-15 light tank, of the Belgian Army

== Other uses ==
- T-15 (reactor), a Russian tokamak fusion research reactor
- Estonian national road 15
- T15 road (Tanzania)
- German torpedo boat T15
- Little Swanport language
