= Robert J. O'Conor Jr. =

American judge (1934-2023)

Judge of the United States District Court for the Southern District of Texas
- In office April 25, 1975 – September 30, 1984
- Appointed by: Gerald Ford
- Preceded by: Ben Clarkson Connally
- Succeeded by: Lynn Hughes

Personal details
- Born: Robert J. O'Conor Jr. June 22, 1934 Los Angeles, California, U.S.
- Died: June 5, 2023 (aged 88) Los Angeles, California, U.S.
- Spouse: Helen O'Conor
- Education: University of Texas at Austin (B.A.); University of Texas School of Law (LL.B.)
- Profession: Lawyer, judge

Military service
- Allegiance: United States
- Branch/service: United States Army
- Years of service: 1957–1964
- Rank: Captain
- Unit: J.A.G. Corps

Robert J. O'Conor Jr. (June 22, 1934 – June 5, 2023) was a United States district judge of the United States District Court for the Southern District of Texas and an attorney in private practice.

== Education and career ==
O'Conor was born in Los Angeles, California. He received a Bachelor of Arts degree from the University of Texas at Austin in 1956. He received a Bachelor of Laws from the University of Texas School of Law in 1957. He was in the United States Army Reserve as a Captain in the JAG Corps from 1957 to 1964. He was in private practice of law in Laredo, Texas from 1958 to 1975.

== Federal judicial service ==
O'Conor was nominated by President Gerald Ford on March 17, 1975, to a seat on the United States District Court for the Southern District of Texas vacated by Judge Ben Clarkson Connally. He was confirmed by the United States Senate on April 24, 1975, and received his commission on April 25, 1975. O'Conor's service was terminated on September 30, 1984, due to his resignation.

== Post judicial service ==
After his resignation from the federal bench, O'Conor returned to the private practice of law in Houston, Texas. He remained active with law firm FedArb, which provides alternative dispute resolution in complex commercial cases. In addition to his service with FedArb, he also maintained a private law practice with his wife, Helen D. O'Conor.

== Sources ==
Legal offices
Preceded by Ben Clarkson Connally	Judge of the United States District Court for the Southern District of Texas; 1975–1984	Succeeded by Lynn Hughes
