= Ben Clarkson Connally =

American judge

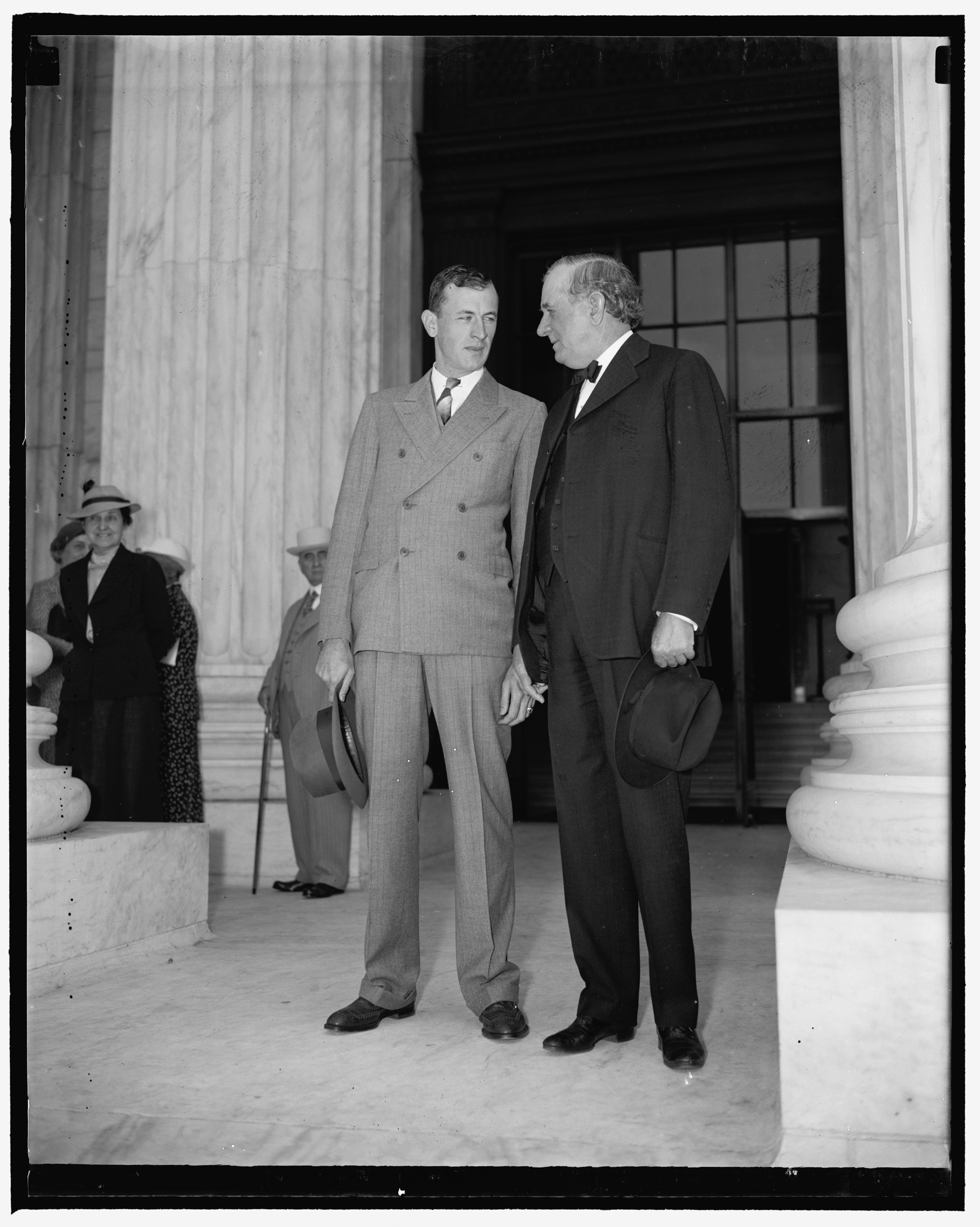
- Clarkson with his father Tom Connally in 1937

Senior Judge of the United States District Court for the Southern District of Texas
- In office December 28, 1974 – December 2, 1975

Chief Judge of the United States District Court for the Southern District of Texas
- In office 1962–1974
- Preceded by: Allen Burroughs Hannay
- Succeeded by: Reynaldo Guerra Garza

Judge of the United States District Court for the Southern District of Texas
- In office October 13, 1949 – December 28, 1974
- Appointed by: Harry S. Truman
- Preceded by: Seat established by 63 Stat. 493
- Succeeded by: Robert J. O'Conor Jr.

Personal details
- Born: Ben Clarkson Connally; December 28, 1909 Marlin, Texas, U.S.
- Died: December 2, 1975 (aged 65) Brooks County Hospital, Falfurrias, Texas, U.S.
- Spouse: Sarah Nell Allen
- Children: Ben Connally . Thomas Allen Connally
- Parent: Tom Connally Louise Clarkson
- Education: University of Texas at Austin (B.A.); University of Texas School of Law (LL.B.); Harvard Law School (LL.M.)

Ben Clarkson Connally (December 28, 1909 – December 2, 1975) was a United States district judge of the United States District Court for the Southern District of Texas.

== Education and career ==
Born in Marlin, Texas, Connally received a Bachelor of Arts degree from University of Texas at Austin in 1930, a Bachelor of Laws from the University of Texas School of Law in 1933, and a Master of Laws from Harvard Law School in 1934. He was in private practice in Houston, Texas from 1934 to 1942. He was in the United States Army Air Corps during World War II from 1942 to 1945. He returned to private practice in Houston until 1949.

== Federal judicial service ==
On September 23, 1949, Connally was nominated by President Harry S. Truman to a new seat on the United States District Court for the Southern District of Texas created by 63 Stat. 493. He was confirmed by the United States Senate on October 12, 1949, and received his commission on October 13, 1949. He served as a member of the Judicial Conference of the United States from 1959 to 1962. He served as Chief Judge from 1962 to 1974, assuming senior status on December 28, 1974, and remaining in that status until his death on December 2, 1975.

== Sources ==
Legal offices
Preceded by Seat established by 63 Stat. 493	Judge of the United States District Court for the Southern District of Texas; 1949–1974	Succeeded by Robert J. O'Conor Jr.
Preceded by Allen Burroughs Hannay	Chief Judge of the United States District Court for the Southern District of Texas; 1962–1974	Succeeded by Reynaldo Guerra Garza
