= Marlin Independent School District =

School district in Texas

Coordinates: 31.3136°N 96.8805°W

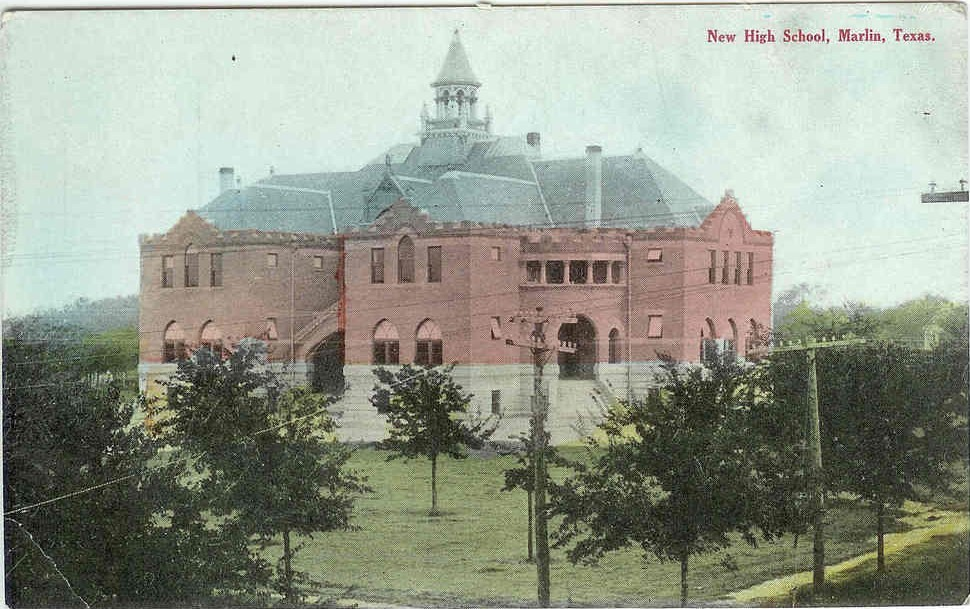
"New" high school, about 1905

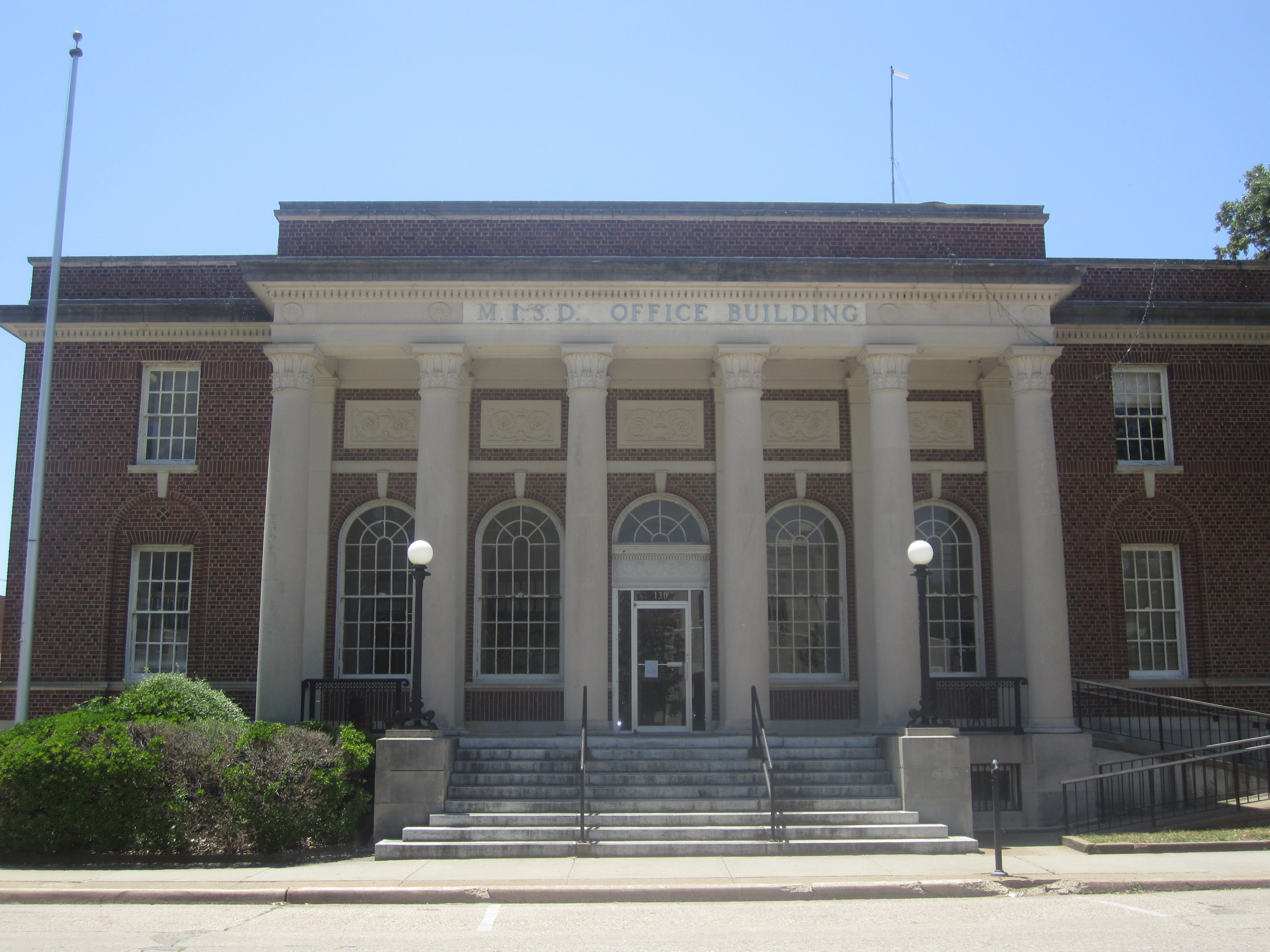
Marlin ISD office complex

Marlin Independent School District is a public school district based in Marlin, Texas, United States. The district serves students in eastern Falls County.

In 2009, the school district was rated "academically acceptable" by the Texas Education Agency. In 2010, the high school, middle school, and learning center were all rated academically acceptable as well.

In 2015 the district had about 900 students.

The district superintendent is Dr. Darryl Henson, who was selected in 2020.

== History ==
Michael Seabolt became the superintendent in 2015.

Marlin ISD received an "academically unacceptable" rating from the Texas Education Agency (TEA) in 2011. In 2013 and 2014 the TEA gave it "improvement required". In September 2015 the TEA sent a letter stating that it planned to revoke the accreditation as of July 1, 2016, which would lead to the closure of the district. Stephanie Butts of the Waco Tribune-Herald wrote that the announcement caught Marlin ISD officials "off guard".

In response, Marlin ISD filed a request for an informal review of the closure. The announcement resulted in a meeting being held by the Saved Our Schools volunteer organization. In November 2015 the TEA gave a temporary reprieve requiring academic improvement.

In August 2016 the district received another poor rating from the TEA, but instead of closing the district the TEA moved to take over its operations.

Marlin ISD's TEA accreditation was revoked in 2018. The TEA took over the district. TEA control is scheduled to end in 2026.

== Schools ==
- Marlin High School (Grades 9-12)
- Marlin Junior Academy (Grades 6-8) - Middle school
- Marlin Primary Academy (Grades PK-5) - Elementary school

The elementary and middle school campuses were previously Marlin Elementary School and Marlin Middle School, but in 2015 the names were changed due to a rule from the TEA.
