= Marlin High School =

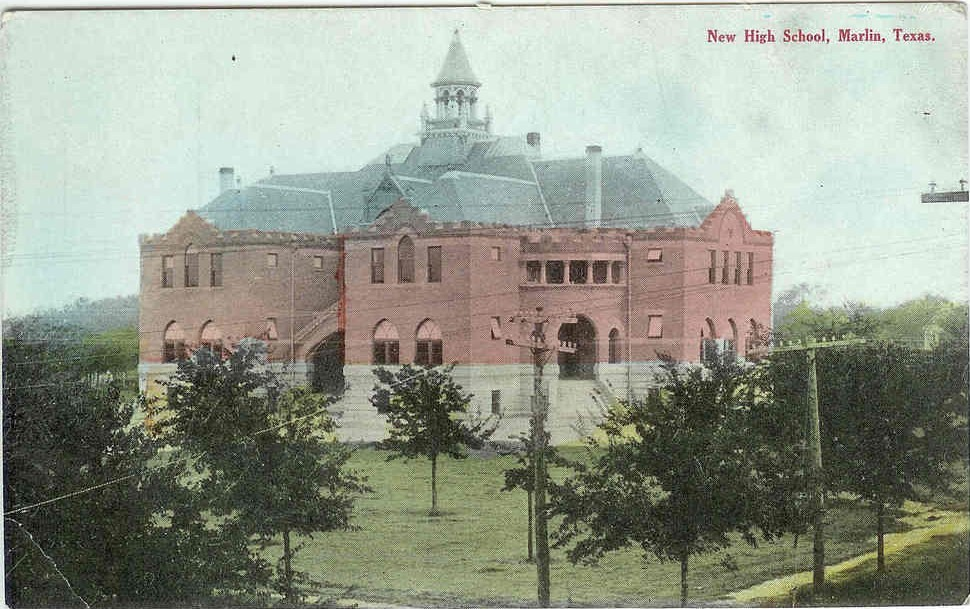
- School circa 1900-1910

Location
- 1400 Capps St; Marlin, Texas 76661; United States
- Coordinates: 31°18′33″N 96°52′35″W

Information
- School type: Public high school
- School district: Marlin Independent School District
- Principal: Remy Godfrey
- Grades: 9-12
- Enrollment: 250 (2024)
- Colors: Gold & Purple
- Athletics conference: UIL Class AAA
- Mascot: Bulldog
- Website: Marlin High School

Marlin High School is a public high school in the city of Marlin, Texas, United States. It is part of the Marlin Independent School District located in central Falls County. The school is classified as a 2A school by the University Interscholastic League (UIL). In 2015, the school was rated "Met Standard" by the Texas Education Agency.

== History ==
A brick school was constructed in 1903 after a fire destroyed the public-school building in 1900. In 1923, Marlin Independent School District was founded.

In early 2023 the school had 33 12th grade students in its standard program. By the end of the school year the school administration discovered that five of those students qualified to graduate, so the graduation ceremony was delayed. While Marlin's Director of Human Resources and teacher Jesse Mustamante said, "The support was there" for students from teachers, several students strongly disagreed.

== Athletics ==
The Marlin Bulldogs compete in cross country, volleyball, football, basketball, golf, track, softball, and baseball

=== Football ===
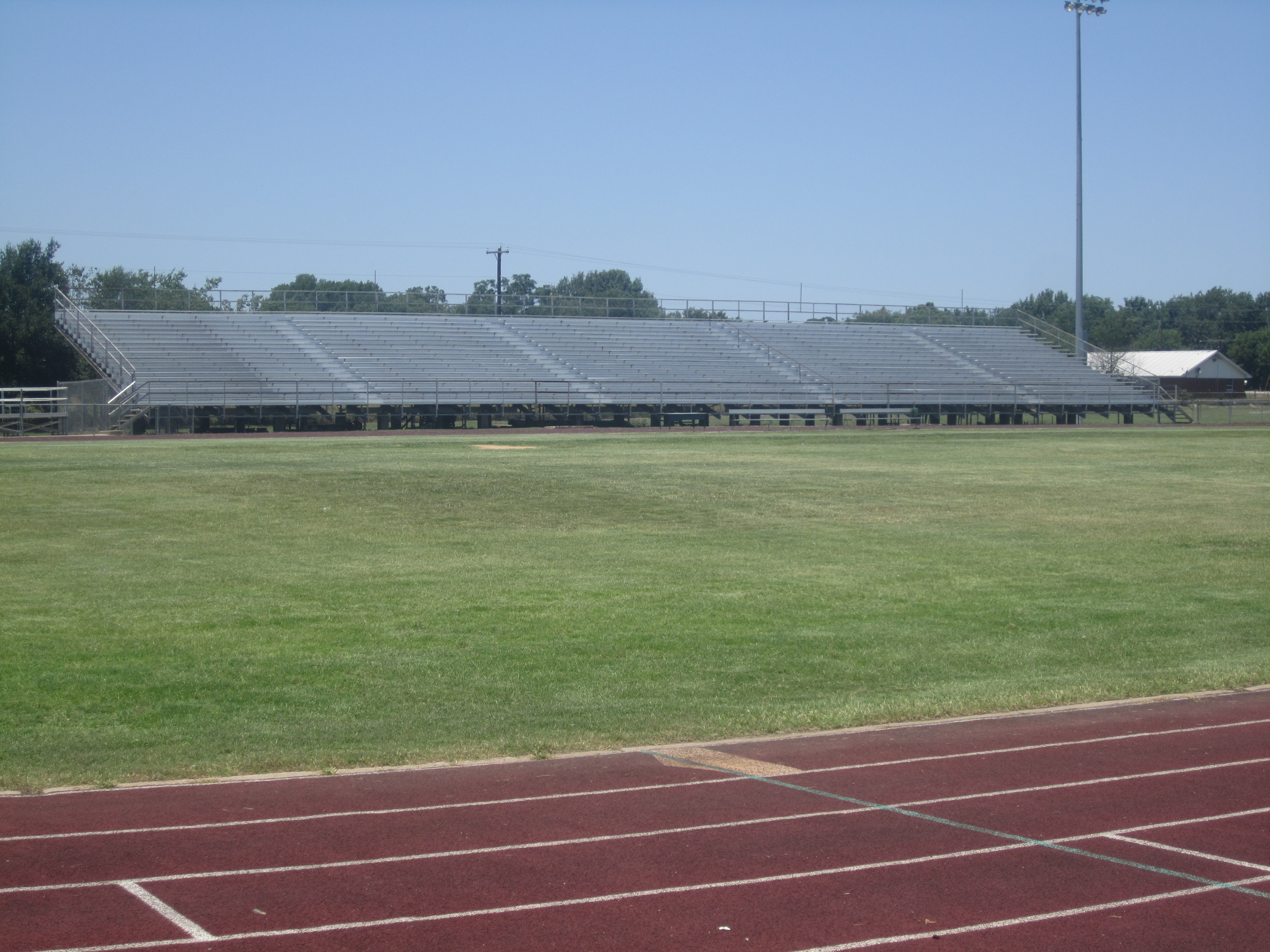
Marlin High School football stadium

=== State titles ===
Marlin (UIL)

- Boys' track -
  - 1914(1A), 1991(3A)

Marlin Washington (PVIL)

- Girls' track -
  - 1957(PVIL-2A), 1957(PVIL-2A), 1962(PVIL-3A), 1963(PVIL-3A)

==== State finalists ====
Marlin (UIL)

- Football -
  - 1964(2A), 2003(3A/D2)

Lost to Palacios 12–0 in 1964 and Atlanta 34–0 in 2003.

Marlin Washington (PVIL)

- Football -
  - 1964(PVIL-3A)

== Notable alumni ==
- Danario Alexander
- Dan Kubiak
