= Lynn Hughes =

American judge (born 1941)

Lynn Nettleton Hughes
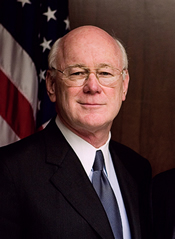

Senior Judge of the United States District Court for the Southern District of Texas
- Incumbent
- Assumed office February 12, 2023

Judge of the United States District Court for the Southern District of Texas
- In office December 17, 1985 – February 12, 2023
- Appointed by: Ronald Reagan
- Preceded by: Robert J. O'Conor Jr.
- Succeeded by: Nicholas Ganjei

Personal details
- Born: Lynn Nettleton Hughes; 1941 (age 84–85) Houston, Texas, U.S.
- Education: University of Alabama (BA); University of Texas (JD); University of Virginia (LLM)

Lynn Nettleton Hughes (born 1941) is an inactive senior United States district judge of the United States District Court for the Southern District of Texas. He gained attention for being removed from a number of cases for showing bias and failing to follow federal rules. Hughes has been involuntarily removed from so many cases that the Court of Appeals for the Fifth Circuit has describe removing him as "déjà vu all over again."

== Education and career ==
Hughes was born in Houston. He received a Bachelor of Arts degree from the University of Alabama in 1963 and a Juris Doctor from the University of Texas School of Law in 1966. He was in private practice in Houston from 1966 to 1979. He was President of Southwest Resources in Houston from 1969 to 1970. He was a judge on the 165th Judicial District, State of Texas from 1979 to 1980. He was a judge on the 189th Judicial District, State of Texas from 1981 to 1985. He was an adjunct professor at the South Texas College of Law from 1973 to 2003. He was an adjunct professor at the University of Texas School of Law from 1990 to 1991. He received a Master of Laws from the University of Virginia School of Law in 1992. Since approximately 2008, Hughes has been a lecturer focusing on ethical issues for the 35,000-member American Association of Petroleum Geologists.

=== Federal judicial service ===
Hughes was nominated by President Ronald Reagan on October 16, 1985, to a seat on the United States District Court for the Southern District of Texas vacated by Judge Robert J. O'Conor Jr. He was confirmed by the United States Senate on December 16, 1985, and received his commission on December 17, 1985. He assumed inactive senior status on February 12, 2023.

== Rulings and appeals ==
=== Sex discrimination ruling and reversal on appeal ===
In the case of Equal Employment Opportunity Commission v. Houston Funding II, Ltd. et al., Case Number H-11-2442 (S.D. Tex. Feb. 2, 2012), Donnicia Venters, a mother represented by the EEOC, claimed that she was fired from Houston Funding due to her request to be allowed to pump breastmilk upon her return to work after giving birth. Houston Funding claimed that it had fired Venters for abandoning her job for over two months after giving birth. Venters sued Houston Funding, alleging that the company had discriminated against her based on her sex. Citing several previous District Court opinions which had already ruled on the issue, Judge Hughes explained that breastfeeding is not covered by Title VII of the Civil Rights Act.

In the ruling, Hughes writes, "Even if the company's claim that she was fired for abandonment is meant to hide the real reason – she wanted to pump breast milk – lactation is not pregnancy, childbirth or a related medical condition. She gave birth on Dec. 11, 2009. After that day, she was no longer pregnant and her pregnancy-related conditions ended. Firing someone because of lactation or breast-pumping is not sex discrimination." Hughes was overruled by the Fifth Circuit Court of Appeals which held that Venters had established a prima facie case of sex discrimination under Title VII. Critically, the Fifth Circuit found Hughes to be so biased that it took the unusual step of reassigning the case to a district court judge on remand.

=== Sexism controversy ===
Upon dismissing the indictment in a case titled United States v. Swenson, Judge Hughes sharply criticized a female prosecutor on the case, saying "It was a lot simpler when you guys wore dark suits white shirts and navy ties . . . we didn’t let girls do it in the old days." The Fifth Circuit reversed, and stated that Judge Hughes' comments were "demeaning, inappropriate and beneath the dignity of a federal judge." The Fifth Circuit reassigned the case to another judge, finding Hughes to be too biased.

=== Reversed in an employment discrimination case ===
The United States Court of Appeals for the Fifth Circuit reversed the judge in an employment discrimination case and took the rare step of reassigning it to another judge and said this:

From the outset of these suits, the district judge’s actions evinced a prejudgment of Miller’s claims. At the beginning of the Initial Case Management Conference, the judge dismissed sua sponte Miller’s claims against TSUS and UHS, countenancing no discussion regarding the dismissal. Later in the same conference, the judge responded to the parties’ opposition to consolidating Miller’s two cases by telling Miller’s counsel, “I will get credit for closing two cases when I crush you. . . . How will that look on your record?”

And things went downhill from there. The court summarily denied Miller’s subsequent motion for reconsideration, denied Miller’s repeated requests for leave to take discovery (including depositions of material witnesses), and eventually granted summary judgment in favor of SHSU and UHD, dismissing all claims. Miller now appeals the district court’s rulings and asks for her cases to be reassigned on remand. Mindful of the fundamental right to fairness in every proceeding—both in fact, and in appearance, we REVERSE, REMAND, and direct that these cases be REASSIGNED to a new district judge for further proceedings.

The Fifth Circuit also notes that previous to the Miller case Hughes handled another case, McKoy, in a similar fashion – which also resulted in the case being similarly reversed and remanded.

In support of her position, Miller refers us to McCoy v. Energy XXI GOM, LLC, 695 F. App’x 750 (5th Cir. 2017). In that case, the same district judge [, i.e. Hughes,] imposed substantially similar discovery restrictions to those imposed here. Id. at 753. Specifically, the district judge denied almost all requests for discovery and “permitted only the deposition of [the plaintiff]” and “the disclosure by the defendants of certain documents pertaining to the specific [object] at issue,” certain photographs, and a video. Id. On appeal, we reversed and remanded the case on summary judgment grounds, finding genuine issues of material fact existed, even with the limited discovery that had been permitted. Id. at 758. But we also noted that “[t]he district court abused its discretion in refusing to allow [the plaintiff] to conduct sufficient discovery . . . to support the allegations he ha[d] fairly raised[.]” Id. at 759.

=== Sua sponte reassignment in the Khan case ===
In U.S. v. Khan, the Fifth Circuit took what it self-described as the "rare" move of reassigning a criminal case on appeal, doing so despite the absence of a request from either party, given the bias displayed by Judge Hughes in the trial court proceedings. Hughes engaged in personally insulting conduct, attacking individual attorneys for the federal government, which caused the Fifth Circuit to conclude that his behavior "reveal[ed] a level of prejudice" that was unacceptable for a federal judge. Because Hughes had supervised the trial court proceedings for more than four years, the Fifth Circuit lamented that "reassignment is regrettable," but concluded that "it is nonetheless necessary for the reasons we have stated."

The absence of a request for reassignment meant that the Fifth Circuit's decision to reassign is called "sua sponte." In general, federal courts limit their decisions to the issues presented by the parties. United States v. Sineneng-Smith, 140 S. Ct. 1575 (2020). Moreover, in general, federal appellate courts are extremely hesitant to require reassignment of a judge after an appeal, particularly if the judge has substantial experience with a case.

=== Upheld in COVID-19 vaccination requirement suit ===
In Jennifer Bridges v. Houston Methodist Hospital Hughes ruled that private employers have the right to require COVID-19 vaccinations as a condition for employment, even while the vaccine was only available under an Emergency Use Authorization. He dismissed the case by rejecting the arguments of the plaintiffs because Texas law only permits employees to sue for wrongful termination if they were required by their employer to engage in illegal conduct, while receiving the COVID-19 vaccine is legal. He further noted that individual plaintiffs would still be able to seek medical or religious accommodations under the Americans With Disabilities Act of 1990 and Title VII of the Civil Rights Act of 1964. He found that the vaccine has been authorized for emergency use by the FDA, and that the plaintiffs were not clinical trial participants, and were therefore not being utilized as test subjects. He rejected the notion that requirement for vaccination violated the Nuremberg Code and described the comparison of vaccination to the Holocaust was "reprehensible". This opinion was upheld by the Fifth Circuit in June 2022.

== Criticism for bias ==
Hughes has repeatedly been chastised for failing to follow the law of the appellate court which supervises him. In a 2022 case, the Fifth Circuit found "record support" for the "serious accusation" that Hughes "had prejudged the case...from the outset." In reversing Hughes and reassigning the case to a new judge on remand, the Fifth Circuit highlighted that it has repeatedly "reassigned this district judge's cases before," and highlighted five separate instances over as many years, in which the Fifth Circuit found that a "reasonable observer" would likely question Hughes' "impartiality," noting his overt bias and explicit sexism had forced the Court of Appeals to strip him of cases.

Hughes was also reprimanded for explicitly attacking a female attorney representing the United States of America in open court. While on the record, Hughes stated that "It was a lot simpler when you guys wore dark suits, white shirts and navy ties...We didn't let girls do it in the old days."

In a rebuke on appeal, the Court of Appeals for the Fifth Circuit reversed Hughes - who had dismissed the prosecution as a punitive sanction - and reprimanded Hughes that his "comments are demeaning, inappropriate, and beneath the dignity of a federal judge.”

After the decision, Hughes subsequently banned the same female attorney from ever appearing before him again as a punishment for raising his misconduct to the attention of the court of appeals. The Fifth Circuit again intervened, vacating his order and finding that he had "abused his discretion." Judge James Ho concurred in the vacatur, noting that "it’s hard to imagine a less persuasive way for a judge to rebut the charge that he discriminated against a female attorney than by expelling her from his courtroom—not just in one case, but in every case that she may bring for the rest of her career."

== See also ==
- List of United States federal judges by longevity of service

Legal offices
Preceded by Robert J. O'Conor Jr.	Judge of the United States District Court for the Southern District of Texas; 1985–2023	Succeeded by Nicholas Ganjei
