= The Marlin Democrat =

Newspaper in Marlin, Texas

- Publisher: Lindsey Vaculin
- Editor: Lindsey Vaculin
- Founded: 1890
- Headquarters: 251 Live Oak Street Marlin, TX 76661
- Circulation: 624 (as of 2023)
- Website: https://www.marlindemocrat.com/

The Marlin Democrat is a newspaper headquartered in Marlin, Texas. It, along with Rosebud News, is owned by Marlin Publications, Inc. In July 2015, Central Texas Publishing, LP acquired Marlin Publications.
