= Amarillo Lake =

Lake in Texas, United States

- Location within Texas Location within the United States
- Location: Amarillo, Texas
- Coordinates: 35°13′07.2″N 101°51′08.6″W
- Type: Playa
- Basin countries: United States
- Surface area: 656 acres (265 ha)
- Average depth: 48 ft (15 m)
- Surface elevation: 3,612 ft (1,101 m)
- References: GNIS

Amarillo Lake, also known as Wildhorse Lake, is a lake located in northern Amarillo, Texas. The reservoir is situated on the south side of Interstate 40 (and the historic Route 66). The city of Amarillo was originally constructed around the lake.

== See also ==
- Amarillo Creek
