= Marlin Airport =

- IATA: none; ICAO: none; FAA LID: T15

Summary
- Airport type: Public
- Owner: City of Marlin
- Serves: Marlin and Falls County
- Location: Marlin, Texas
- Elevation AMSL: 411 ft / 125 m
- Coordinates: 31°20′26″N 096°51′07″W

Map
- Location of Marlin Airport

Runways
Direction	Length		Surface
Direction	ft	m	Surface
17L/35R	3,021	921	Asphalt

Statistics
- Aircraft operations: avg. 29 per month

The Marlin Airport is a public municipal airport located and owned by the city of Marlin, Texas. The facility includes one runway that extends to over 3,000 feet long that is asphalt. The airport opened in 1960 and is about three miles northeast of Marlin, right next to Lake Marlin.

== See also ==
- List of airports in Texas
