= Meridian Creek =

Stream in North Slope Borough, Alaska, U.S.

Coordinates: 69°00′10″N 159°55′03″W

Meridian Creek is a stream in North Slope Borough, Alaska, in the United States. It is a tributary of the Colville River.

Meridian Creek was so named from the fact its course is roughly parallel with the 160th meridian west.

== See also ==
- List of rivers of Alaska
