= Amarillo Creek =

Creek in northern Texas

Location
- Country: United States

Physical characteristics
- Mouth
  - location: Amarillo, Texas
  - coordinates: 35°25′26″N 101°52′01″W

Amarillo Creek is a creek in Amarillo, Texas, in Potter County. The creek comprises Eastern and Western branches, with the mouth being on the Canadian River. The yellow banks of the river, and the nearby Amarillo Lake inspired the name of the city after the Spanish word "yellow”.

== East Amarillo Creek ==
The East Amarillo Creek, also known as Hedrio Creek rises to the north of the city, flowing north for fifteen miles before meeting the Canadian River.

== West Amarillo Creek ==
The West Amarillo Creek rises to near the Cadillac Ranch to the west of the city, flowing eighteen miles before meeting the Canadian River.
