= John Marlin (Texas settler) =

John Marlin (October 17, 1792 – March 12, 1847) was a colonist in Mexican Texas who was the namesake of Marlin, Texas. He was also a justice of the peace.

According to a descendant, John and his brother James Marlin emigrated from Ireland, while genealogists state he was born in Madison County, Alabama. He came to Texas in 1832 and settled near Sarahville de Viesca, Texas, in Robertson's Colony.

John was granted a league of land (4,428 acres) east of the Brazos River in 1835 and started a settlement later honored on his behalf years after his death. Marlin's son-in-law, Samuel Blain, laid out the streets and lots of the town.

John Marlin's wife was Mary Menefee Marlin (1789–1845), whom he married in Tennessee in 1817. The family left because of violent clashes with the Native Americans, but John and Mary returned to Bucksnort by 1837, near Fort Milam, along with the George Morgan family. There was a massacre in January 1839 that left several of the Morgans dead.

John and Mary Marlin had seven children:

- John Menefee Marlin (February 3, 1818 – November 4, 1836)
- William Nimrod Perry Marlin (February 22, 1820 – January 1, 1871)
- Louisa A. Marlin (born May 2, 1823), married Samuel A. Blain on May 19, 1841
- Rufus Anderson Marlin (January 9, 1824 – 1866)
- Ashley Stephen Marlin (January 2, 1827 – September 30, 1885)
- Oakley Dean Marlin (October 8, 1830 – died before July 25, 1853)
- Emily O. Marlin (May 7, 1833 – died before 1851), married to James Wimberley

Marlin died in Bucksnort in 1847. In 1850, when Falls County was established, the settlement was changed to Marlin and made the county seat.
