= Texas State Highway 14 =

Highway in Texas

State Highway 14

Route information
- Maintained by TxDOT
- Length: 60.148 mi (96.799 km)
- Existed: April 4, 1917–present

Major junctions
- South end: SH 6 southwest of Bremond
- US 84 in Mexia
- North end: I-45 in Richland

Location
- Country: United States
- State: Texas
- Counties: Robertson, Falls, Limestone, Freestone, Navarro

Highway system
- Highways in Texas; Interstate; US; State; Former; Toll; Loops; Spurs; FM/RM; Park; Rec
| ← I-14 | → Loop 14 |

State Highway 14 (SH 14) is a state highway in the east central region of the U.S. state of Texas. The highway runs from SH 6 south of Bremond to Interstate 45 in Richland.

== Route description ==
State Highway 14 begins at an intersection with SH 6 about 3 miles southwest of Bremond. The route travels northeastward through Bremond, mainly through farmland in central Texas, passing through the western edge of Kosse, intersecting SH 7, then briefly runs through Thornton before reaching Groesbeck, intersecting SH 164. It then passes through Mexia, intersecting SH 171 and US 84. Between Groesbeck and Mexia, SH 14 runs along the eastern edge of Fort Parker State Park and passes just east of the Confederate Reunion Grounds State Historic Site. The highway then travels through Wortham before reaching its northern terminus at I-45 on the north side of Richland near the western shore of the Richland-Chambers Reservoir. The entire route closely parallels the original Southern Pacific (now Union Pacific) railway lines.

== History ==
Historic SH 14

SH 14 was one of the original twenty six state highways proposed on June 21, 1917, known as the Dallas-Houston Highway. From 1917 the routing mostly followed present day I-45 from Dallas to Corsicana, but going through an unbuilt route through Teague to Houston. On July 17, 1917, SH 14 was rerouted south of Corsicana. From there, the highway turned southwest to Bremond, then following SH 2 to Houston. On November 21, 1917, an intercounty highway was designated from Bremond via Franklin to Bryan. The section of SH 14 south of Bremond was cancelled that day. On March 19, 1918, SH 14 was extended southeast over this intercounty highway. The section from Bremond to Bryan was cancelled on August 21, 1923 (but would be restored as SH 255 on October 26, 1937, which would have its south end in Wheelock). In 1926, US 75 was overlaid on the northern half of SH 14. On April 10, 1934, SH 14 was extended north to west of Sherman, replacing SH 116. On April 9, 1935, SH 14 Spur was created to Thornton. On September 26, 1939, the portion from Dallas to Gunter was renumbered as SH 289 and the section that US 75 overlaid was cancelled. On September 26, 1967, SH 14 was extended south from FM 46 (and SH 6 before this day), to SH 6. The highway has had the same routing since.

== Major intersections ==
| County | Location | mi | km | Destinations | Notes |
|---|---|---|---|---|---|
| Robertson | | 0.0 | 0.0 | SH 6 – Hearne, Waco | |
| Robertson | Bremond | 3.7 | 6.0 | FM 1373 west | |
| Robertson | Bremond | 4.3 | 6.9 | FM 46 – Marlin, Franklin | |
| Robertson | Bremond | 4.7 | 7.6 | FM 2413 south (Lamar Street) | south end of FM 2413 overlap |
| Robertson | Bremond | 4.9 | 7.9 | FM 2413 north | north end of FM 2413 overlap |
| Falls | No major junctions | | | | |
| Limestone | Kosse | 14.1 | 22.7 | FM 413 west – Reagan | |
| Limestone | Kosse | 14.5 | 23.3 | SH 7 – Marlin, Centerville, Marquez | |
| Limestone | Kosse | 15.0 | 24.1 | FM 339 north | |
| Limestone | Thornton | 22.3 | 35.9 | FM 1246 east – Oletha | south end of FM 1246 overlap |
| Limestone | Thornton | 22.4 | 36.0 | FM 1246 west | north end of FM 1246 overlap |
| Limestone | | 26.7 | 43.0 | FM 147 west – Marlin | |
| Limestone | Groesbeck | 30.2 | 48.6 | FM 3401 north | |
| Limestone | Groesbeck | 30.6 | 49.2 | SH 164 (Yeagua Street) – Mart, Buffalo | |
| Limestone | Groesbeck | 30.8 | 49.6 | FM 1245 west (West Trinity Street) – Fort Parker Monument | south end of FM 1245 overlap |
| Limestone | Groesbeck | 31.0 | 49.9 | FM 1245 east (West Jacinto Street) | north end of FM 1245 overlap |
| Limestone | | 35.1 | 56.5 | PR 35 west – Old Fort Parker | |
| Limestone | | 35.8 | 57.6 | PR 28 – Fort Parker State Park | |
| Limestone | | 37.5 | 60.4 | FM 2705 north / County Road 463 – Forest Glade, Lake Mexia, Confederate Reunion Grounds State Historic Site | |
| Limestone | Mexia | 41.2 | 66.3 | FM 1633 south – Forest Glade, Confederate Reunion Grounds State Historic Site | |
| Limestone | Mexia | 41.6 | 66.9 | FM 39 south (West Tyler Street) – Jewett | Access to Parkview Regional Hospital |
| Limestone | Mexia | 42.4 | 68.2 | US 84 (Milam Street) – Bellmead, Teague | |
| Limestone | Mexia | 42.5 | 68.4 | SH 171 – Coolidge, Teague | |
| Limestone | Mexia | 42.8 | 68.9 | FM 3119 north | |
| Freestone | Wortham | 50.0 | 80.5 | FM 27 – Fairfield | |
| Navarro | Currie | 55.6 | 89.5 | FM 641 west to FM 1394 | |
| Navarro | Richland | 59.9 | 96.4 | FM 1394 | |
| Navarro | | 60.2 | 96.9 | I-45 – Dallas, Houston | I-45 exit 219A; no access from I-45 north to SH 14 south |
1.000 mi = 1.609 km; 1.000 km = 0.621 mi: Concurrency terminus; Incomplete access
