= Frankie Smith (American football) =

American football player (born 1968)

No. 28, 29, 27
- Position: Defensive back

Personal information
- Born: October 8, 1968 (age 58); Fort Worth, Texas, U.S.
- Listed height: 5 ft 9 in (1.75 m)
- Listed weight: 186 lb (84 kg)

Career information
- High school: Groesbeck (Groesbeck, Texas)
- College: Baylor
- NFL draft: 1992: 4th round, 104th overall pick

Career history
- Atlanta Falcons (1992)*; Miami Dolphins (1993–1995); New England Patriots (1996)*; San Francisco 49ers (1996–1997); Chicago Bears (1998–2000)
- * Offseason or practice squad member only

Career NFL statistics
- Tackles: 116
- Fumble recoveries: 2
- Sacks: 4
- Stats at Pro Football Reference

Frankie L. Smith (born October 8, 1968) is an American former professional football player who was a cornerback in the National Football League (NFL). He played college football for the Baylor Bears and was selected 104th overall by the Atlanta Falcons in the fourth round of the 1992 NFL draft. He played in the NFL for the Miami Dolphins (1993-1995), San Francisco 49ers (1996-1997), and Chicago Bears (1998-2001). Smith is now a coach at Groesbeck Independent School District.
