= National Register of Historic Places listings in Limestone County, Texas =

Location of Limestone County in Texas

This is a list of the National Register of Historic Places listings in Limestone County, Texas.

This is intended to be a complete list of properties listed on the National Register of Historic Places in Limestone County, Texas. There are seven properties listed on the National Register in the county.

This National Park Service list is complete through NPS recent listings posted September 11, 2026.

== Current listings ==
The publicly disclosed locations of National Register properties may be seen in a mapping service provided.

	Name on the Register	Image	Date listed	Location	City or town	Description
1	Booker T. Washington Emancipation Proclamation Park	Booker T. Washington Emancipation Proclamation Park	May 24, 1976 (#76002046)	W side of Lake Mexia, 9 mi (14 km). W of Mexia; 31°39′17″N 96°35′56″W	Mexia vicinity	
2	Joseph E. Johnston Confederate Reunion Grounds	Joseph E. Johnston Confederate Reunion Grounds	April 2, 1976 (#76002048)	4 mi (6.4 km). W of Mexia on SR 1633; 31°37′59″N 96°33′36″W	Mexia vicinity	
3	Liberty Square Apartments	Liberty Square Apartments	August 29, 2018 (#10002847)	Roughly bounded by N Leon, W Sabine, N Preston, W Jacinto & N Fannin Sts. 31°31′43″N 96°32′10″W	Groesbeck	
4	Liberty Village Apartments	Liberty Village Apartments	August 29, 2018 (#10002846)	215 Elwood Enge Dr. & 612 S Ellis St. 31°31′03″N 96°32′19″W	Groesbeck	
5	Texas Hall, Old Trinity University	Texas Hall, Old Trinity University	July 12, 1978 (#78002971)	College and Westminster Sts. 31°44′38″N 96°32′43″W	Tehuacana	
6	Vinson Site		January 17, 1991 (#90001530)	Address restricted	Tehuacana vicinity	
7	Cindy Walker House		July 23, 2026 (#100013268)	114 S. Brooks Street; 31°40′48″N 96°28′06″W	Mexia	

== See also ==
- National Register of Historic Places listings in Texas
- Recorded Texas Historic Landmarks in Limestone County
