= Forest Glade =

Forest Glade can refer to:

- A glade
- Forest Glade, Windsor, Ontario, Canada
- Forest Glade, Texas, USA
