= Kenneth Sims =

American football player (1959–2025)

No. 77
- Position: Defensive end

Personal information
- Born: October 31, 1959; Kosse, Texas, U.S.
- Died: March 21, 2025 (aged 65)
- Listed height: 6 ft 5 in (1.96 m)
- Listed weight: 272 lb (123 kg)

Career information
- High school: Groesbeck (Groesbeck, Texas)
- College: Texas
- NFL draft: 1982: 1st round, 1st overall pick

Career history
- New England Patriots (1982–1989); Buffalo Bills (1992)*
- * Offseason or practice squad member only

Awards and highlights
- PFWA All-Rookie Team (1982); Lombardi Award (1981); UPI Lineman of the Year (1981); Unanimous All-American (1981); Consensus All-American (1980); 2× All-SWC First Team (1980, 1981); 2× Longhorn Football Team MVP (1980, 1981); Longhorn Hall of Honor inductee (1997)

Career NFL statistics
- Sacks: 17.0
- Fumble recoveries: 5
- Stats at Pro Football Reference
- College Football Hall of Fame

Kenneth Wayne Sims (October 31, 1959 – March 21, 2025) was an American professional football defensive end who played in the National Football League (NFL) for eight seasons with the New England Patriots. He played college football for the Texas Longhorns, winning the Lombardi Award and UPI Lineman of the Year en route to a victory in the 1982 Cotton Bowl Classic. Sims was selected first overall by the Patriots in the 1982 NFL draft, but his professional career would be afflicted by injuries. He was inducted to the College Football Hall of Fame in 2021.

== Early life ==
Sims was born in Kosse, Texas. In his junior year at Groesbeck High School, Sims quit football but then realized that football was indeed for him and went on to spend his senior year playing linebacker, fullback and tight end, rather than as a tackle.

== College career ==
At the University of Texas at Austin, Sims spent his freshman year learning the basics of the tackle position. He spent his sophomore year behind Steve McMichael and Bill Acker, then became a force his junior year. He made 131 tackles, and was named All-Conference and an All-American. As a senior in 1981, Sims became the first Longhorn to win the Lombardi Award, was named the 1981 UPI Lineman of the Year, was the top defensive vote-recipient for the Heisman Trophy (8th overall) and earned all-conference and All-American status once again. In 1981, he helped Texas to finish 10–1–1, win the 1982 Cotton Bowl Classic, and finish ranked second nationally, their best end-of-year ranking since 1970.

During his college career, Sims recorded 322 tackles (including 50 tackles for loss), 29 sacks, 15 forced fumbles, seven fumble recoveries and three blocked kicks.

== Professional career ==
Sims was the first overall pick in the 1982 NFL draft, only the third Longhorn to be selected with the first pick. In his rookie year, he came in fifth in the voting for the NFL Defensive Rookie of the Year. With the New England Patriots in the NFL, Sims played 74 career games and had 17 sacks over eight NFL seasons. His best year was 1985, when he managed 5.5 sacks despite only playing in 13 games after he broke his leg late in the regular season. He did not get to play in Super Bowl XX, which the Patriots lost. Sims suffered multiple injuries to his knees, legs and back throughout his career, limiting his play such that the only complete season he played was 1984. He had surgery in 1987 for his back. After that season he signed a one-year, incentives based contract with the Patriots but he ruptured his Achilles tendon in the opening game of the year and missed the remainder of the season. He was signed to another one-year contract in 1989 and played most of the 1989 season, but missed the last game with an injured knee.

Following the 1985 season, the Patriots instituted a voluntary drug testing program after six players, including Sims, admitted to struggling with drugs over the prior years. Sims supported the program and said that he'd gotten himself clean after going through a team-supported drug rehabilitation program. In 1990, Sims was arrested in Austin, Texas, and charged with possession of cocaine. He was released by the Patriots 16 days later for failing to stay in proper shape.

In 1992, after spending time in rehab, Sims signed a one-year contract with the Buffalo Bills—by this time he was being described as a recovering alcoholic; he was waived before the start of the season.

== Death ==
Sims died in his sleep on March 21, 2025, at the age of 65.

== Honors ==
Sims was elected to the College Football Hall of Fame in 2021. He was inducted into the Texas Athletics Hall of Honor in 1997.

== See also ==
- List of Texas Longhorns football All-Americans
- List of New England Patriots first-round draft picks
