= Booker T. Washington State Park =

Booker T. Washington State Park may refer to:

- Booker T. Washington State Park (Tennessee)
- Booker T. Washington State Park (West Virginia)
- Booker T. Washington Park (Texas)
