= Kosse, Texas =

- Town
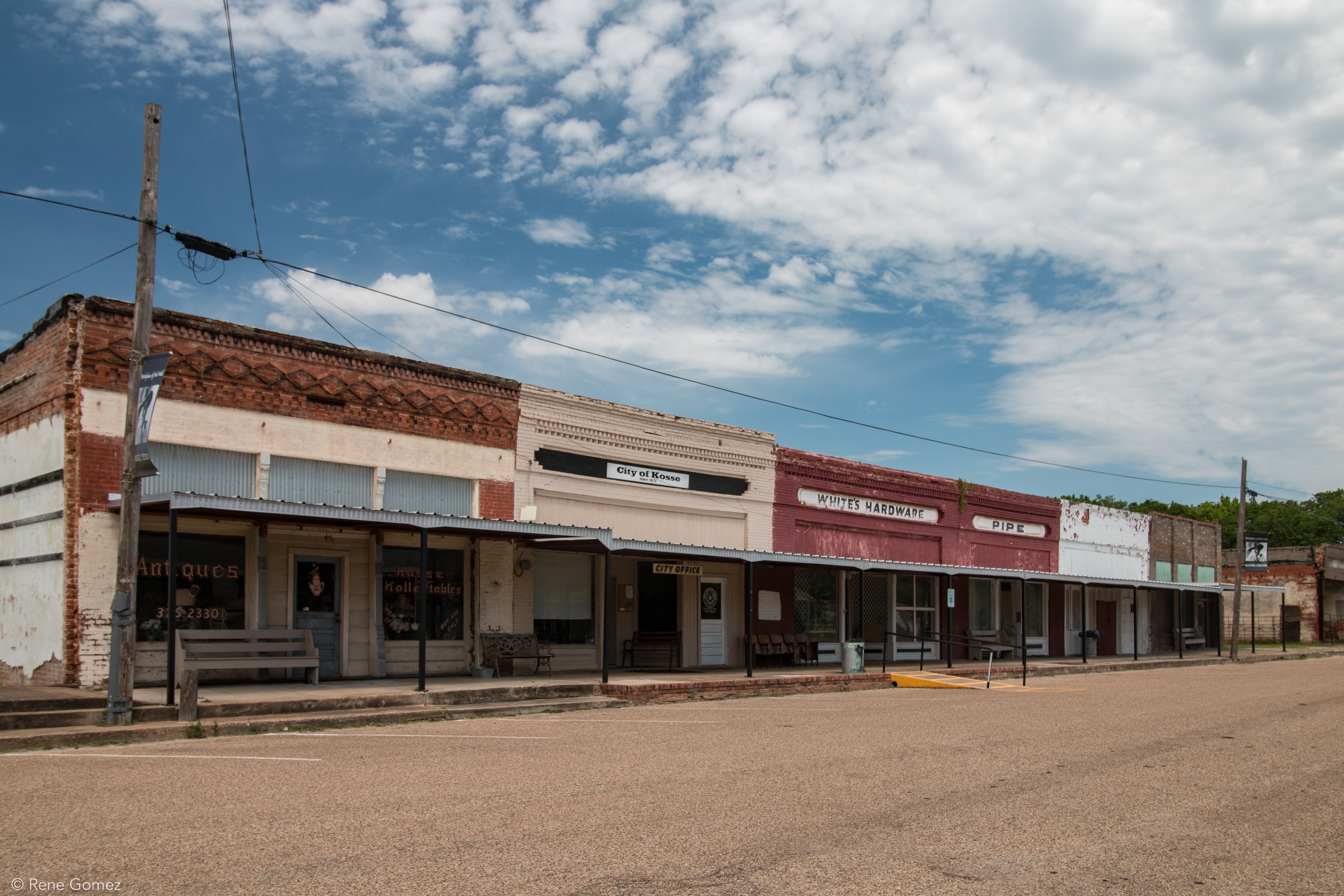
- Kosse, Texas

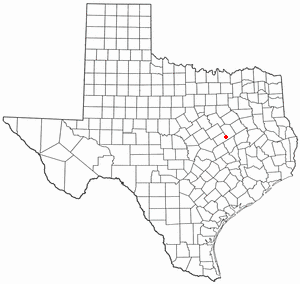
- Location of Kosse, Texas

- Coordinates: 31°18′27″N 96°37′49″W
- Country: United States
- State: Texas
- County: Limestone

Area
  - Total: 1.30 sq mi (3.37 km^{2})
  - Land: 1.29 sq mi (3.34 km^{2})
  - Water: 0.012 sq mi (0.03 km^{2})
- Elevation: 499 ft (152 m)

Population (2020)
  - Total: 458
  - Density: 355/sq mi (137/km^{2})
- Time zone: UTC-6 (Central (CST))
  - Summer (DST): UTC-5 (CDT)
- ZIP code: 76653
- Area code: 254
- FIPS code: 48-39844
- GNIS feature ID: 1360753
- Website: www.kossetexas.com

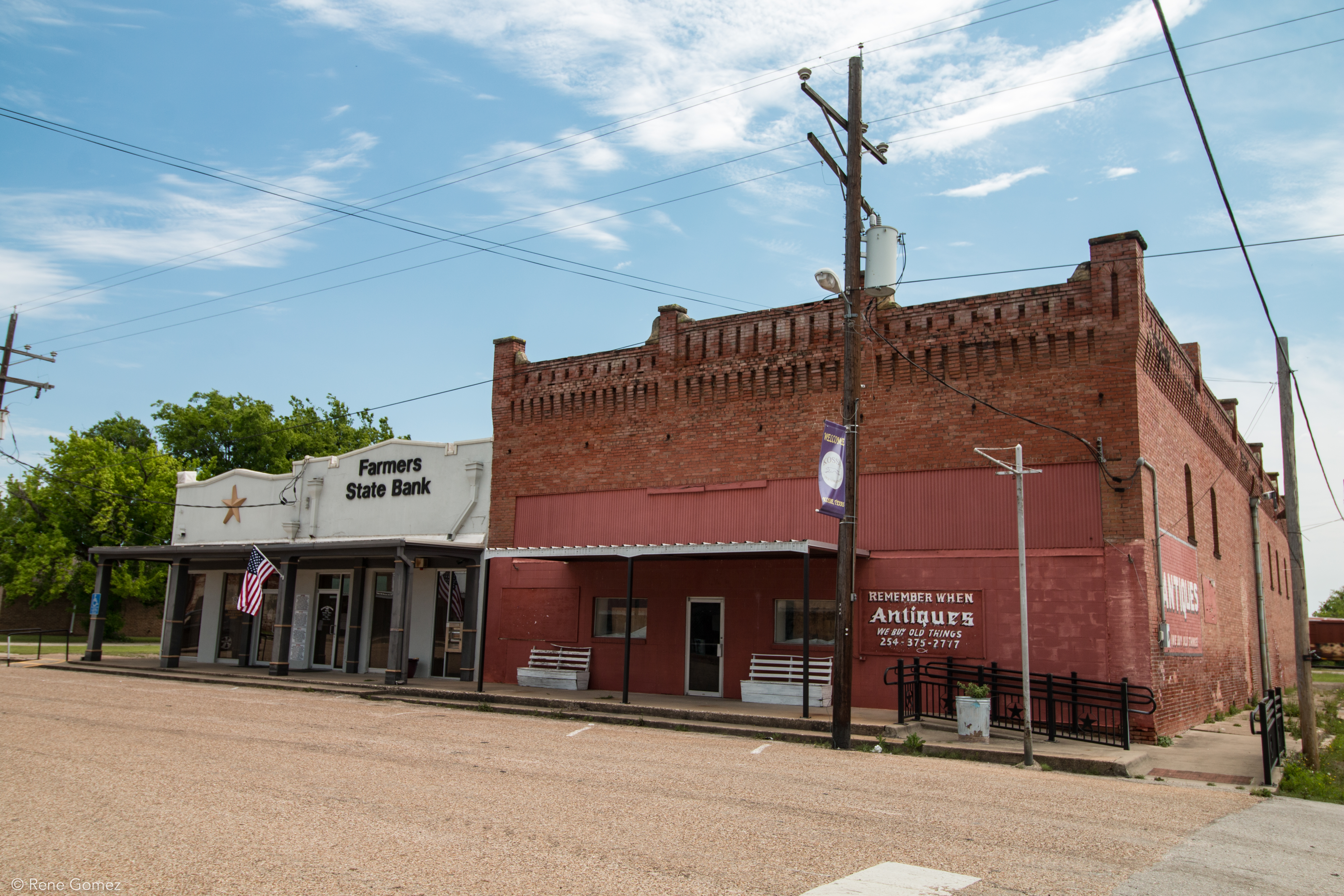
Narcissus Street in Kosse

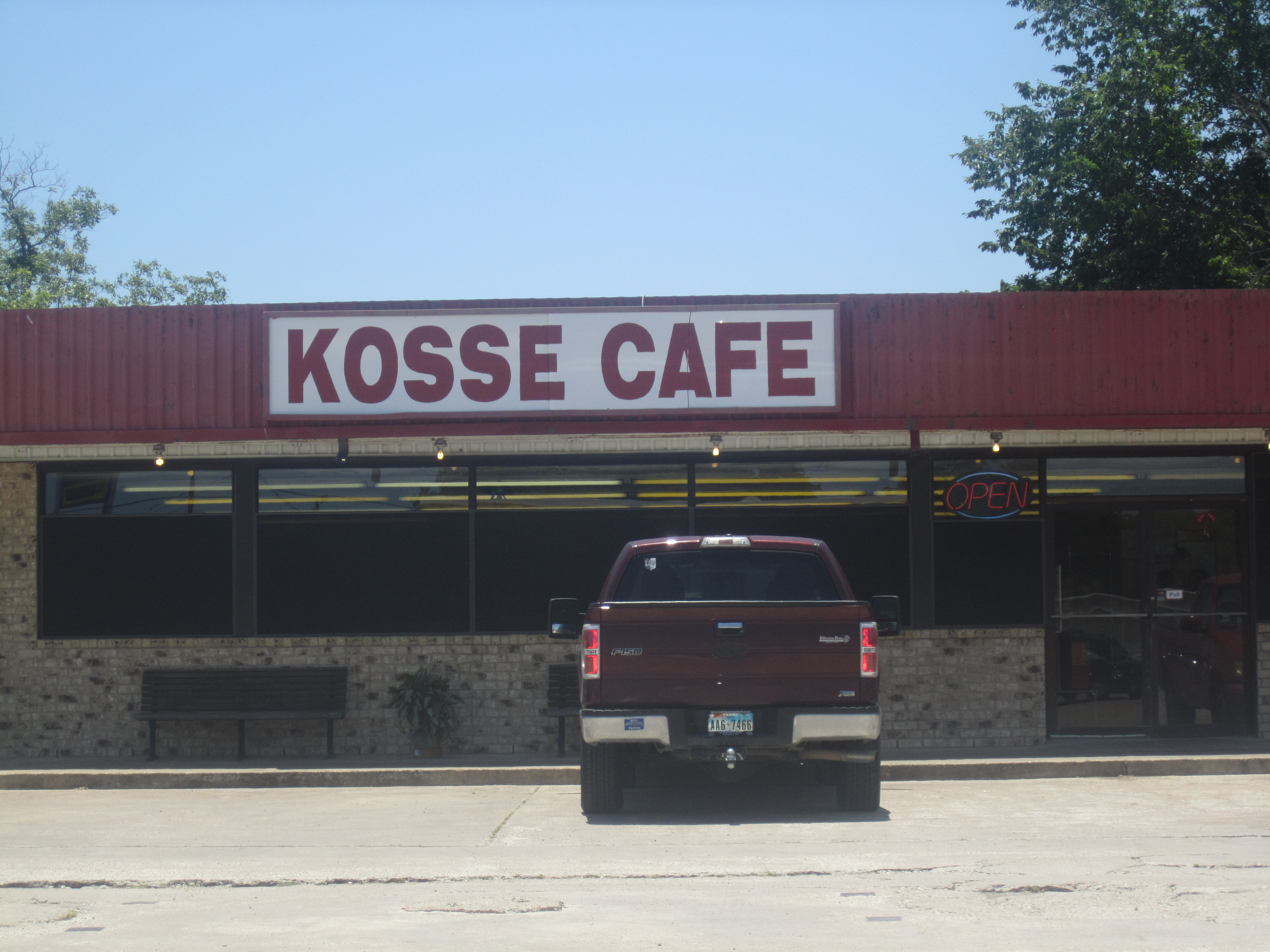
Kosse Cafe is located at the intersection of Texas Highways 7 and 14 and is one of three restaurants in the town.

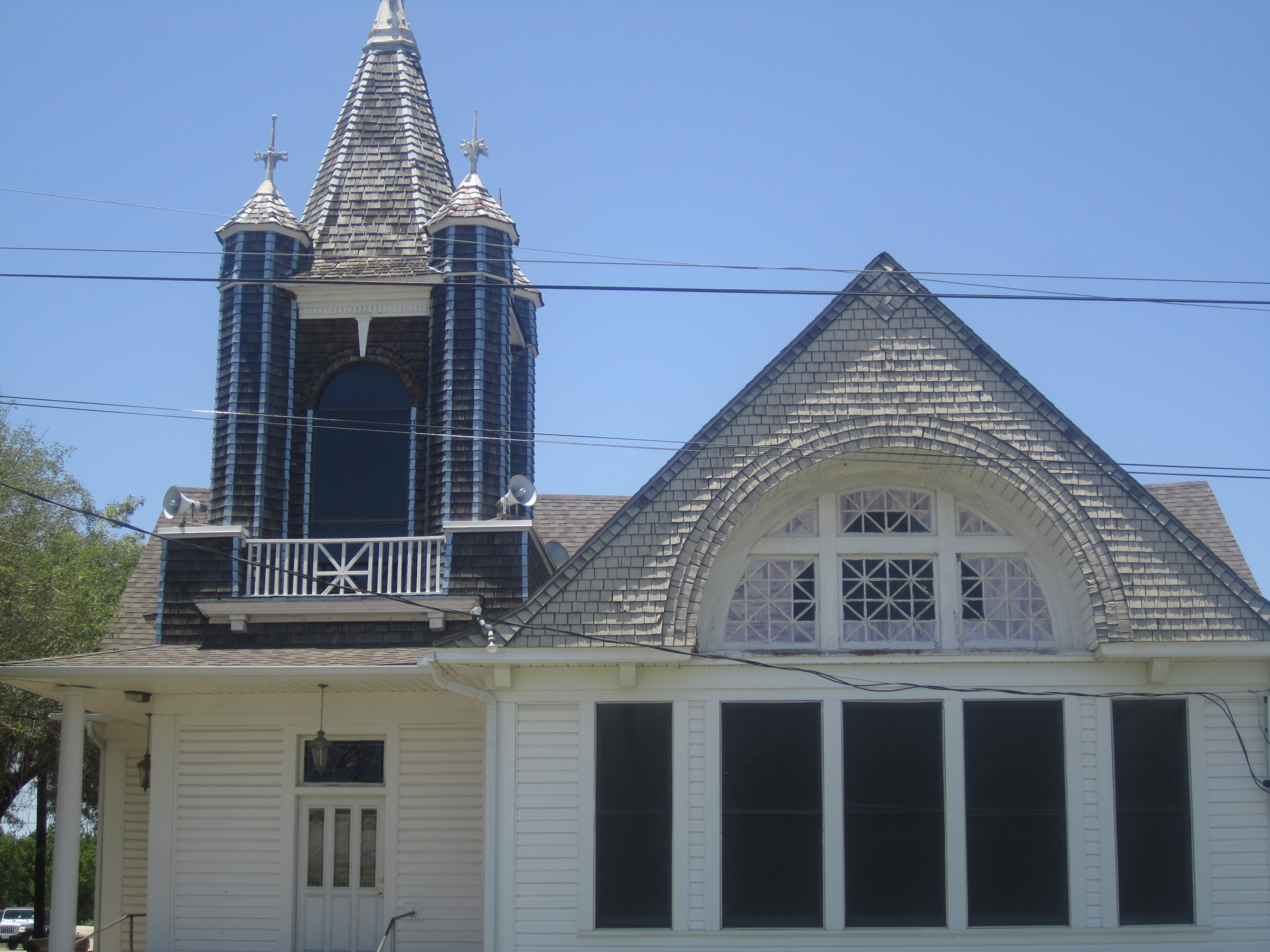
The First Baptist Church of Kosse was built in 1907.

Kosse is a town in southern Limestone County, Texas, United States. The population was 458 at the 2020 census.

Kosse calls itself "A Little Town with a Big Heart."

== Geography ==
Kosse is located at 31°18′27″N 96°37′49″W (31.307452, –96.630267). It is situated at the junction of State Highways 7 and 14 in southwestern Limestone County, approximately 16 miles east of Marlin and 17 miles south of Groesbeck. The closest large cities are Waco, 42 miles to the northwest, and Bryan/College Station, 52 miles south of Kosse.

According to the United States Census Bureau, the town has a total area of 1.3 square miles (3.4 km^{2}), all land.

== History ==
=== Early settlement ===
Initial settlement of the area began in the mid-1840s as a community known as Eutaw. Settlers built homes near Duck Creek and Eutaw was a stage stop for the Franklin-Springfield and Waco-Marlin stage routes.

=== Arrival of the Houston & Texas Central Railway ===
Following the Civil War, the area was in the planned route of the Houston and Texas Central Railway (H&TC) which was being constructed to link Houston to Dallas, Denison and the Red River. The H&TC set aside one acre of land along the rail line two miles west of Eutaw as a townsite, and named it for chief engineer Theodore Kosse. For several months in late 1870 and early 1871, Kosse was the northernmost terminus of the railway, and the population briefly boomed. But by the spring of 1871, the rail line had been extended further north to the new terminus of Groesbeck and Kosse's population was considerably reduced. By 1873, Logan's Railway Business Directory noted that Kosse "contains about 200 inhabitants and is doing little business. When it was the terminus it was a thriving place, now its glory has faded. Cattle constitute the bulk of shipments from here."

=== Incorporation and early years ===
The new town of Kosse was formally incorporated by an Act of the Texas Legislature on May 22, 1871. The Act named G. N. Beaumont, D. T. Igleheart, J. Huey, R. H. Fielder and a Mr. Young to be commissioners to lay off the town and make a town plat. The town's first officers were appointed by the Governor, and the first general election was held on the second Tuesday in November 1872, at which time a mayor, constable and five aldermen were elected for a two-year term. The town was named for H&TC's chief engineer, Theodore Kosse.

=== Late 19th century ===
The first census of Kosse was taken in 1880 when it had a population of 476. Five years later, Kosse had multiple cotton gins, two sawmills, and three gristmills. By 1890 there were 647 residents.

An acre of land was granted for the construction of a public school on October 1, 1884. Kosse became an independent school district in 1893, with J. Thomas Hall as its first superintendent. The district had a total of 225 students. A separate school with 80 students and two teachers served the area's black community.

On December 22, 1895, a fire burned seven brick buildings and destroyed the merchandise of seventeen firms; this caused a loss of $75,000, of which only $30,000 was insured.

=== Early 20th century ===
By the turn of the 20th century, Kosse had emerged as a small but stable regional community that supported the surrounding farms and ranches of southern Limestone County.

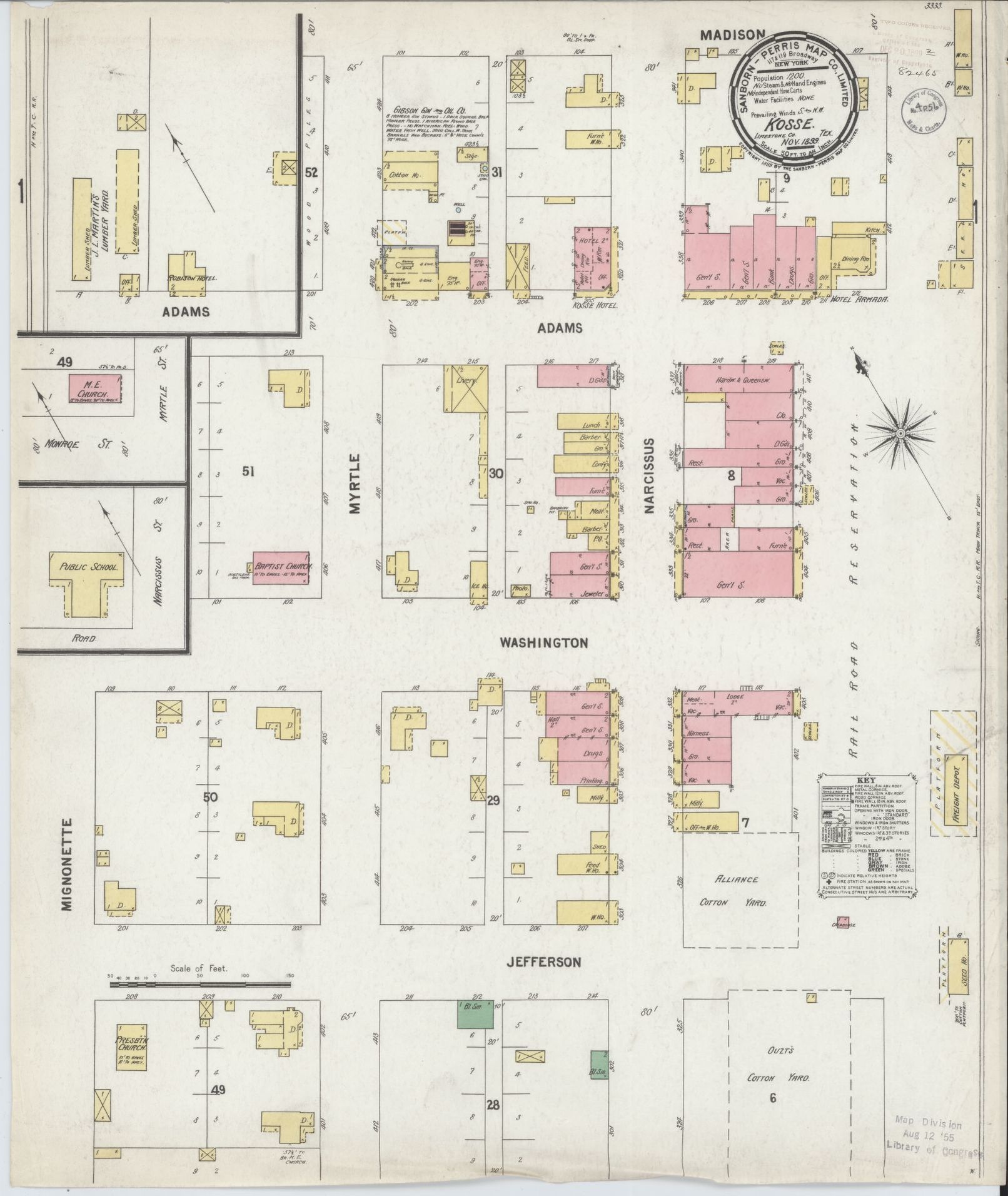
Downtown Kosse in November 1899

Kosse was home to 700 residents in 1914. A local Chamber of Commerce was formed in 1921. In 1922, discovery of oil by wildcatter A. E. Humphreys dramatically transformed Kosse into a temporary oil boom town with thousands of new residents. However, the numerous wells drilled around Kosse did not turn out to be producers, and Kosse's oil boom came to a rapid close early in 1923.

The Great Depression severely impacted Kosse as businesses closed and people left in search of jobs. Declining student enrollment caused the Kosse School Board to vote in favor of consolidation with Groesbeck in 1968. Kosse had eleven businesses in 1989.

== Demographics ==
As of the census of 2000, there were 497 people, 205 households, and 137 families residing in the town. The population density was 381.7 inhabitants per square mile (147.4/km^{2}). There were 269 housing units at an average density of 206.6 per square mile (79.8/km^{2}). The racial makeup of the town was 73.24% White, 18.31% African American, 1.01% Native American, 0.20% Asian, 5.84% from other races, and 1.41% from two or more races. Hispanic or Latino of any race were 10.66% of the population.

Historical population
| Census | Pop. | Note | %± |
|---|---|---|---|
| 1880 | 476 | | — |
| 1890 | 647 | | 35.9% |
| 1900 | 717 | | 10.8% |
| 1910 | 764 | | 6.6% |
| 1920 | 872 | | 14.1% |
| 1930 | 805 | | −7.7% |
| 1940 | 881 | | 9.4% |
| 1950 | 566 | | −35.8% |
| 1960 | 354 | | −37.5% |
| 1970 | 471 | | 33.1% |
| 1980 | 484 | | 2.8% |
| 1990 | 505 | | 4.3% |
| 2000 | 497 | | −1.6% |
| 2010 | 464 | | −6.6% |
| 2020 | 458 | | −1.3% |
U.S. Decennial Census; 2020 Census

There were 205 households, out of which 32.7% had children under the age of 18 living with them, 48.8% were married couples living together, 15.1% had a female householder with no husband present, and 32.7% were non-families. 30.7% of all households were made up of individuals, and 19.5% had someone living alone who was 65 years of age or older. The average household size was 2.42 and the average family size was 3.03.

In the town, the population was spread out, with 27.4% under the age of 18, 7.2% from 18 to 24, 27.0% from 25 to 44, 22.3% from 45 to 64, and 16.1% who were 65 years of age or older. The median age was 36 years. For every 100 females, there were 95.7 males. For every 100 females age 18 and over, there were 82.3 males.

The median income for a household in the town was $25,227, and the median income for a family was $30,781. Males had a median income of $24,167 versus $16,750 for females. The per capita income for the town was $12,868. About 19.6% of families and 25.2% of the population were below the poverty line, including 45.4% of those under age 18 and 21.1% of those age 65 or over.

== Education ==
Public education in the town of Kosse is provided by the Groesbeck Independent School District.

== Notable people ==
- Sam G. Bratton, senator and circuit judge
- John Wesley Hardin, outlaw and killer; claimed to have committed a murder in Kosse, January 1870 (although Kosse hadn't been established yet)
- Kosse Johnson, former All-American football player (Rice University; 1951–1953)
- Walter Angus Keeling, former federal judge and Texas Attorney General
- Kenneth Sims, former professional football player (New England Patriots; 1982–1989). First overall selection in the 1982 NFL draft, inducted into College Football Hall of Fame Class of 2021
- Bob Wills, Western swing musician, songwriter and bandleader
