= Alfonso Steele =

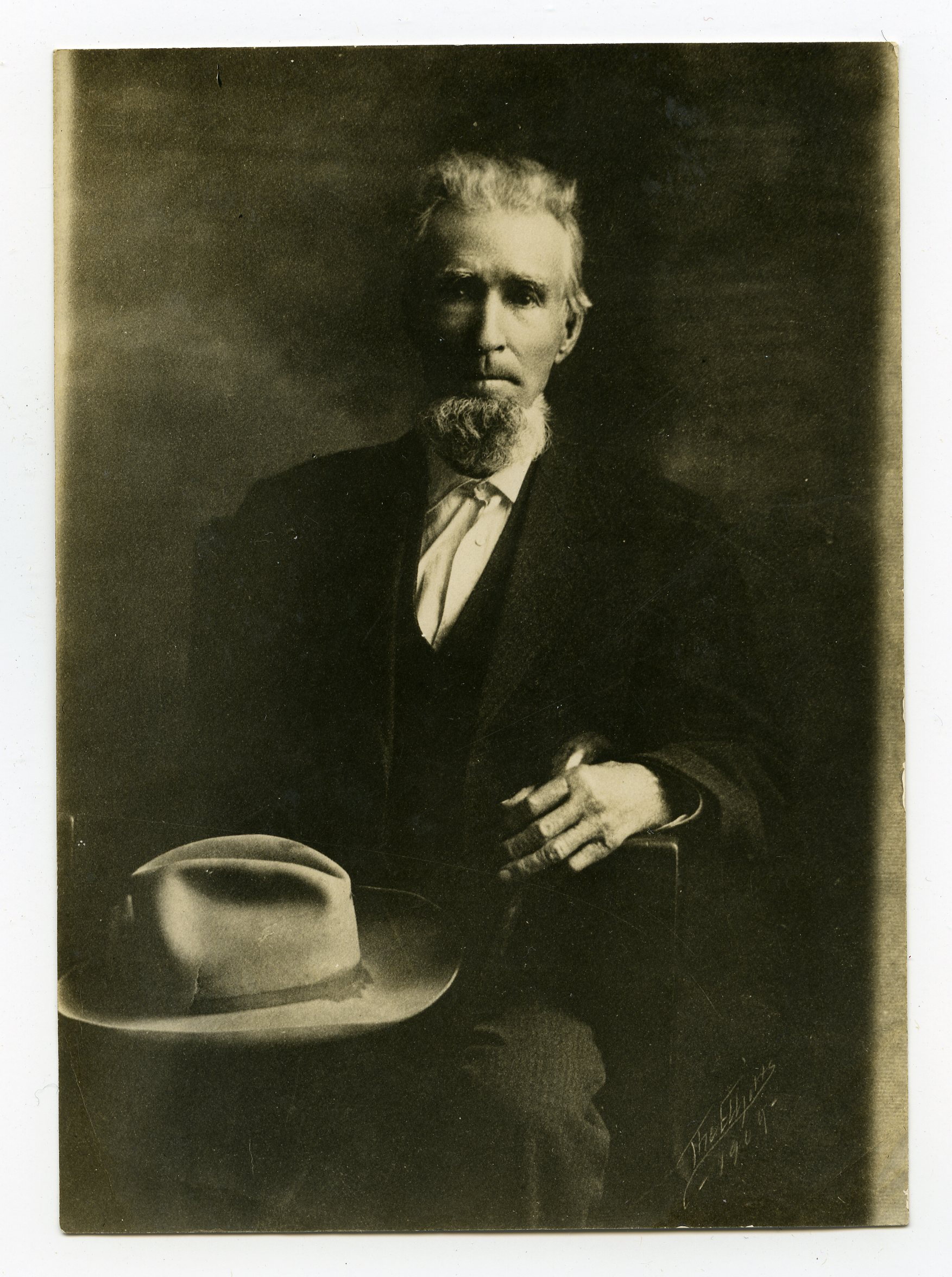
Alphonso Steele in 1909

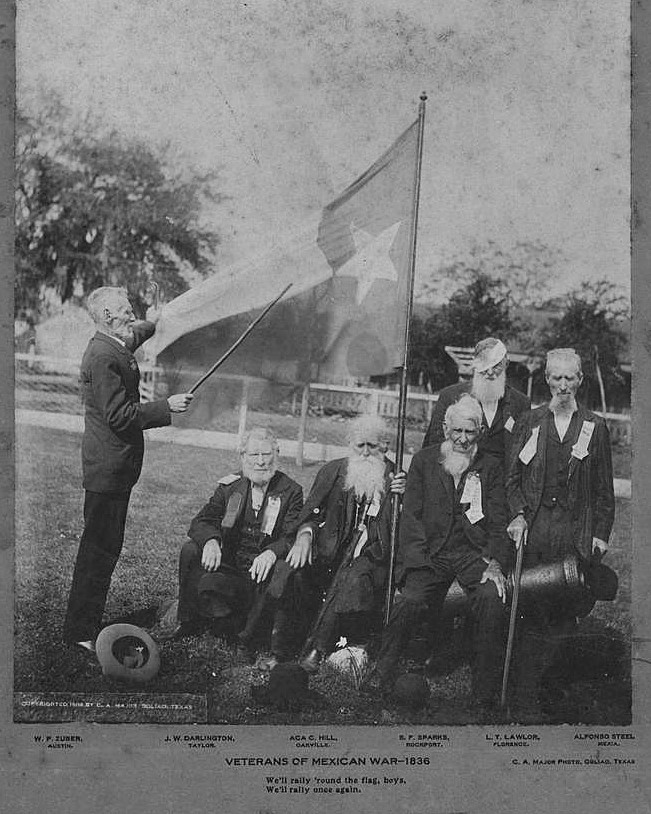
Last reunion of veterans of the 1836 Army of the Republic of Texas, held April 21, 1906 at Goliad. L-R William Physick Zuber of Austin, John Washington Darlington of Taylor, Aca C. Hill of Oakville, Stephen Franklin Sparks of Rockport, L. T. Lawlor of Florence, and Alfonso Steele of Mexia

Alfonso Parcutt Steele (April 9, 1817 – July 8, 1911) was one of the last remaining survivors of the Battle of San Jacinto during the Texas Revolution, and second-to-last survivor of Sam Houston's Army.

== Life ==
Alphonso (Often spelled "Alfonso" in Republic of Texas records) Steele was born in 1817 to Stephen Parcutt Steele and Susannah McCarty Steele, a pioneer family in Hardin County, Kentucky. His grandfather, Thomas Steele, a native of Dublin, Ireland, had served on the schooner "General Putnam" in defense of New York during the Revolutionary War and had settled in Kentucky with his family in 1798. At seventeen, Steele traveled to Lake Providence Louisiana, where he joined Captain Ephraim Daggett's volunteers bound for Texas in 1835. Upon arriving New Year's Day 1836 at Washington-on-Brazos, he found that Texas had not yet declared independence from Mexico. He worked at a local hotel and gristmill across from what would later be named "Independence Hall" and served the signers of the Texas Declaration of Independence. After independence was declared, he then joined a company that marched toward the Alamo, which was under siege, to aid in defense of the Alamo, Colonel William B. Travis, and its defenders. While crossing the Colorado River and receiving word that the Alamo had fallen, Steele and the group then joined Houston's army.

=== Military ===
Steele served as private in Sidney Sherman's regiment at the Battle of San Jacinto (April 21, 1836). He was severely wounded, having been shot through the lung during one of the first volleys of the battle, but continued in the fight until its conclusion and accepted no surrenders. Houston rode Steele's gray horse through much of the battle; it was one of the horses that was shot out from under Houston.

Following the battle's conclusion, he was carried by row boat across Buffalo Bayou to the home of Republic of Texas Vice-President Lorenzo de Zavala in order to have his wounds treated and was then transported by boat to Perkins Island, which had a one-room hospital, where he recuperated for many weeks.

Discharged, Steele made his way to Montgomery County, where he farmed and raised cattle.

=== Family ===
On September 28, 1838, he married Mary Ann Powell. Mary Ann Powell and her family came to Texas by covered wagon with their cousins, the Berryman and the Parker families. The Parker family established Fort Parker near Mexia, Texas, where in 1836 several family members were massacred or kidnapped by a band of Comanche, including Cynthia Ann Parker. Alphonso and Mary Ann Powell later moved to a part of Robertson County that became part of Limestone County. They had several children, one of which being Hampton Steele, who wrote a sketch of the early history of Limestone County, where he lived. Hampton and his brother, Alvarado "Rado" Steele, who served Texas during the Civil War, were the only survivors of the first families that are now in the county. Steele's second son, Alonzo, served Texas as an army officer during the American Civil War and following the war's conclusion served as Commander for Life of the Trans-Mississippi United Confederate Veterans. Alonzo Steele inherited the league of land that was paid to Alphonso Steele for his services provided during the revolution. The land is still owned by several direct descendants living in North Texas. The descendants of Alphonso P. and Mary Ann Powell Steele continue to meet annually the first Saturday in October and the last Saturday in April at the Confederate Reunion Grounds State Historic Site, in Mexia.

== Community Service and Death ==
Steele was a Mason and served in the San Jacinto Veterans Association. He was honored in 1909 by the Thirty-First Texas Legislature as being one of the last two living survivors of the Battle of San Jacinto and was invited to speak on the floor of the Texas Senate. Two years later, on July 8, 1911, he died aged 94. He is buried in the Mexia City Cemetery in Mexia. Upon his death, William Physick Zuber became the last survivor of the Battle of San Jacinto. Zuber died on September 22, 1913, and is buried in the State Cemetery in Austin.

A life-sized portrait of Steele hangs in front of the Senate chamber, to the right of the dais, at the Texas State Capitol in Austin. There was a roadside park dedicated in his honor in Limestone County. The park in question is no longer maintained by the state. The Texas Highway Department (now the Texas Department of Transportation) sold that property. The deed transfer was recorded March 6, 1964.
