= Booker T. Washington Park (Texas) =

State park in Texas, United States

Coordinates: 31.655900°N 96.600900°W

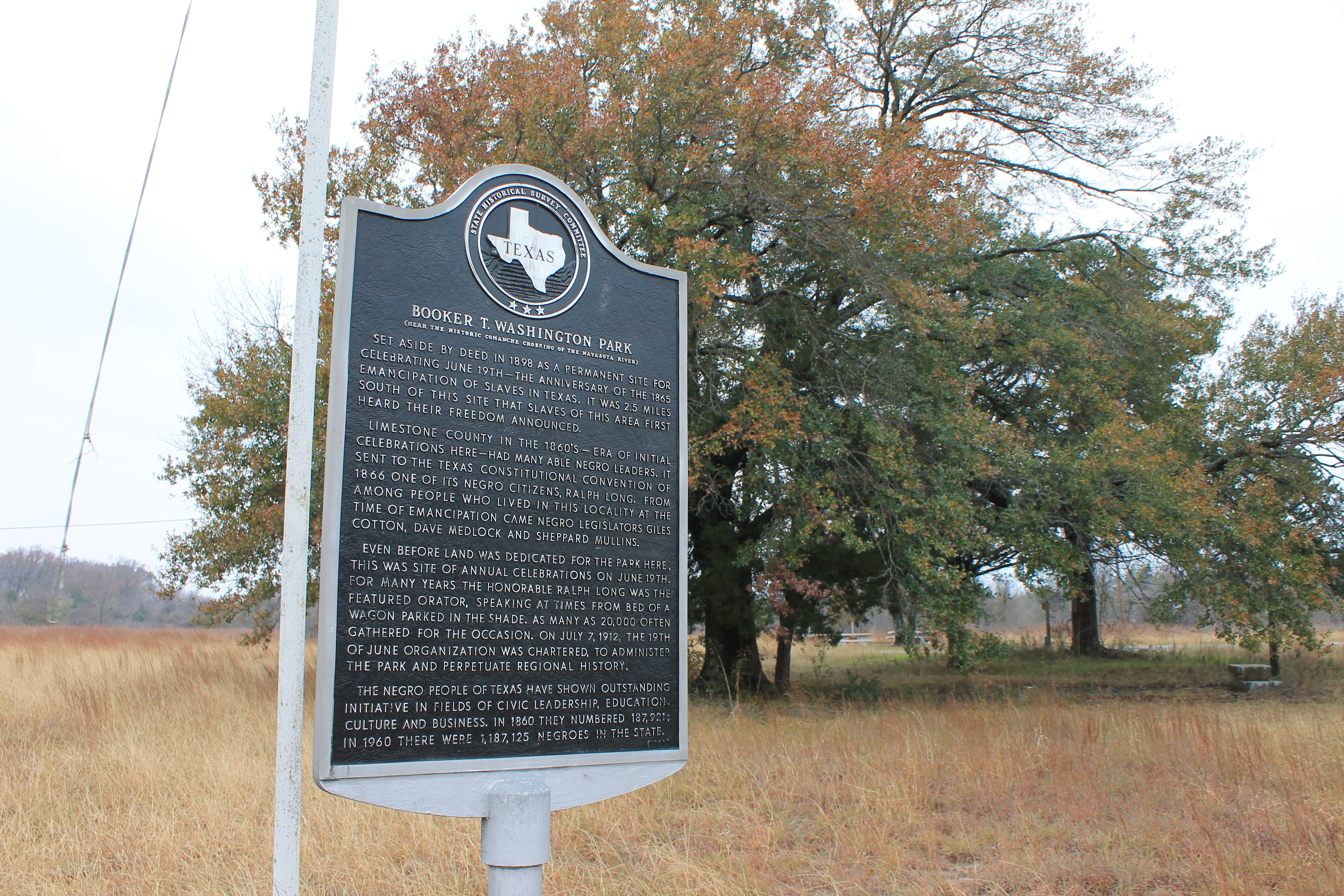
- Historic marker
- Interactive map of Booker T. Washington Park
- Type: State park
- Location: Mexia, Texas
- Area: 18 acres (0.073 km^{2})
- Operator: Nineteenth of June Organization
- Open: Year round
- Website: Official website
- Booker T. Washington Park
- U.S. National Register of Historic Places
- NRHP reference No.: 76002046
- Added to NRHP: May 24, 1976

Booker T. Washington Park is a Texas state park, located at Comanche Crossing, Limestone County, Texas, near Mexia.

== History ==
Starting in the late 1860s, formerly enslaved Black people gathered in the area of the Navasota River to celebrate Juneteenth and the anniversary of Logan Stroud's reading of General Order No. 3. During this time period, celebrations began to coalesce around the area of Comanche Crossing near Mexia. Participants in gatherings included Ralph Long, Giles Cotton, David Medlock, Jr., and Shepard Mullens.

Limestone County Nineteenth of June Organization formed and purchased 10 acres of land around the site of Comanche Crossing in 1898 as a permanent place for the annual celebration of Juneteenth. The organization purchased 20 additional adjacent acres in 1900, bringing the size of the park to 30 acres. The Stroud plantation was 2.5 miles south of this site, where many local enslaved people first heard of the enforcement of emancipation in Texas. The park was first known as Nineteenth Ground and was later renamed for Booker T. Washington.

In 1915, the Nineteenth of June Organization built a speaker's pavilion or tabernacle for events and church services. Around 1950, the group also built a dance pavilion, a raised one-story building with a dance hall and room below the support structure for exhibits and food and drink vendor concession booths.

In the 1920s, when oil was discovered in Mexia, the Nineteenth of June Organization was able to fund their activities by leasing drilling rights to oil fields on the park property. At the same, the organization allowed Colonel Albert Edmund Humphreys to build a dam across the Navasota River which provided them another source of funding and formed a small natural swimming pool as a result. In 1961, the Bistone Municipal Water Supply District purchased land within the park via eminent domain as a part of the construction of the Bistone Dam. In this process, the land was inundated which submerged the swimming pool, Humphreys' dam, and created Lake Mexia.

Crowds as large as 20,000 were reported at the Juneteenth celebrations and attracted out-of-state travelers who heard of the event from former Texas residents. Large gatherings continued into the early 1970s. By 1975, attendance at Juneteenth celebrations had started to decrease, particularly for out-of-state attendees, with suspected reasons being the need to save money due to high gas prices and a weak economy.

In 1981, three Black teenagers, Carl Baker, 19; Anthony Freeman, 18; and Steven Booker, 19 drowned in the park during the annual Juneteenth celebrations. Law enforcement officers had detained the young men for marijuana possession and the boat used to transport them across the lake capsized. The officers were brought to trial on misdemeanor charges for criminally negligent homicide and found not guilty. Each of the deceased's families then sued for civil damages, alleging that their sons’ civil rights had been violated. In December 1983, they settled for a total of $200,000 combined.

Turnout for Juneteenth in 1982 was the lowest in 35 years at about 2,000 people. In 1980, Juneteenth became a Texas state holiday and lead to the development of other Juneteenth celebrations throughout the state, further decreasing attendance of the celebration at the park. In the late 1980s arson damaged the two park structures, requiring them to be rebuilt, and racist graffiti was found spray painted on concession stands. Despite the decline in numbers, Juneteenth celebrations continued each year from the 1980s through the present day.

== See also ==
- National Register of Historic Places listings in Limestone County, Texas
