= Buffalo Mop, Texas =

- Unincorporated community
- Location in Texas Location in the United States
- Coordinates: 31°25′9″N 96°41′41″W
- Country: United States
- State: Texas
- County: Limestone
- Elevation: 486 ft (148 m)
- Time zone: UTC-6 (Central (CST))
  - Summer (DST): UTC-6 (CDT)
- Area code: 254
- GNIS feature ID: 2034774

Buffalo Mop is a small unincorporated community in Limestone County, Texas, United States.
