= Kirk, Limestone County, Texas =

Unincorporated community in Texas, US

Kirk
- Ghost town
- Location in Texas
- Coordinates: 31.5871127°N 96.7280432°W
- Country: United States
- State: Texas
- County: Limestone
- Elevation: 541 ft (165 m)

Population (2000)
  - Total: 10

Kirk is an unincorporated community in Limestone County, Texas, United States.

== History ==
Kirk was established by German farmers in the 1870s. A post office operated from 1890 to 1914, and later consolidated by Mart's. It declined from the 1940s, having a population of 10 as of 2000.
