= Jay T. Robbins =

United States Air Force general

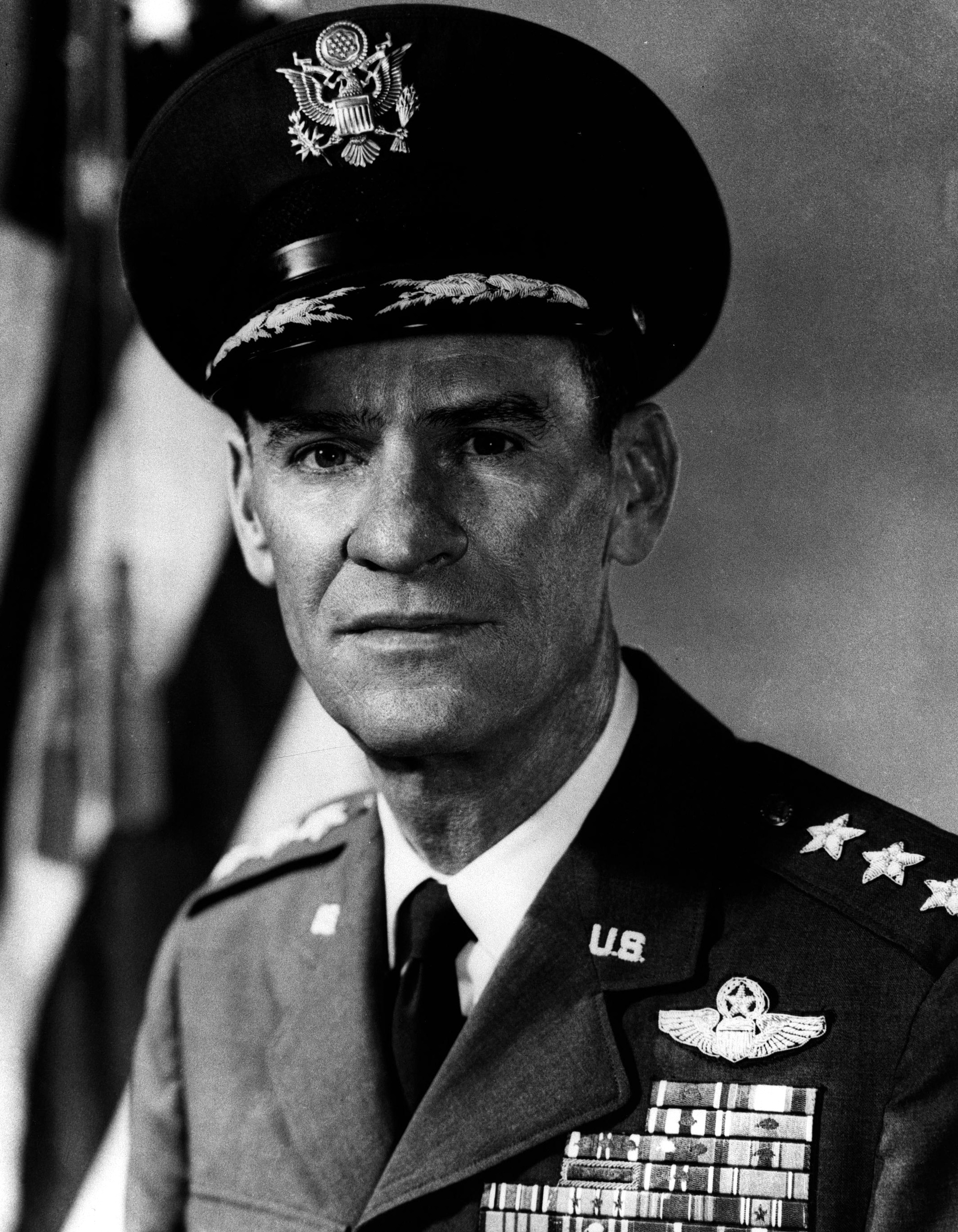
- Lieutenant General Jay Robbins
- Born: 16 September 1919; Coolidge, Texas, US
- Died: 3 March 2001 (aged 81)
- Military career
- Allegiance: United States
- Branch: United States Army Air Forces; United States Air Force
- Service years: 1940–1974
- Rank: Lieutenant General
- Commands: Twelfth Air Force; 313th Air Division; 20th Tactical Fighter Wing; 8th Fighter Group; 80th Fighter Squadron
- Conflicts: World War II
- Awards: Distinguished Service Cross (2); Air Force Distinguished Service Medal (3); Silver Star (2); Legion of Merit (2); Distinguished Flying Cross (4); Air Medal (7)

Jay Thorpe Robbins (16 September 1919 – 3 March 2001) was a career officer in the United States Air Force who rose to the rank of lieutenant general. He was also a United States Army Air Forces fighter ace of World War II.

== Early life ==
Robbins was born in Coolidge, Texas, on 16 September 1919. He was educated at Coolidge High School until 1936 and then attended Texas A&M University, graduating in 1940 with a Bachelor of Science and a commission as second lieutenant through the Reserve Officers' Training Corps.

== World War II ==
Robbins entered active United States Army Air Corps duty at Randolph Field, Texas, in July 1941. He began flying training at Corsicana Air Field, at Randolph Field, and at Foster Field, Texas. He received his pilot's wings in July 1942, and began fighter-aircraft training in the 55th Fighter Squadron, 20th Pursuit Group, at Morris Field, NC and Drew Army Airfield in Florida.

In September 1942, Robbins was assigned to 80th Fighter Squadron, 8th Fighter Group of the Fifth Air Force in the Southwest Pacific area. By September 1943, he had been credited with three aerial victories in two aerial combats. On 4 September 1943 he downed another four Japanese aircraft in one flight, becoming an ace.

In January 1944, Robbins became commander of the squadron and in September 1944 became deputy commander of the group. He flew 607 hours on 181 combat missions in P-39 and then P-38 aircraft. He scored 22 aerial victories against Japanese fighter aircraft, the fourth highest number of enemy aircraft destroyed by an Army Air Forces pilot in the Pacific Theater of Operations. He twice destroyed four enemy fighters during single missions and was awarded the Distinguished Service Cross for each of these missions.

== United States Air Force career ==
After the war ended, Robbins remained in the United States Air Force. He commanded the 434th Army Air Forces Base Unit at Santa Rosa Field, California, from February to November 1945. He next served as squadron operations officer with the 412th Fighter Group (later redesignated the 1st Fighter Group), at March Field, California, the first organization in the Air Force to be equipped with the F-80 jet fighter, and later held several operational staff positions. In June 1947, he was assigned to Headquarters Tactical Air Command (TAC), Langley Air Force Base, Virginia, in plans and operations. In 1949, he was posted to Headquarters Twelfth Air Force, Brooks Air Force Base, Texas. He attended the Air Command and Staff School at Maxwell Air Force Base, Alabama, in early 1950 and, after graduation in June, returned to the Twelfth Air Force. In August 1950, he was assigned as assistant chief, Tactical Air Operations Branch, Headquarters Continental Air Command, Mitchel Air Force Base, New York, and in January 1951, joined the operational staff of the newly established Air Defense Command at Ent Air Force Base, Colorado.

From June 1953 to September 1955, Robbins served as plans and programs officer of the War Plans Division, Directorate of Plans, at Headquarters U.S. Air Force. He then became a member of the Joint Strategic Plans Group of the Joint Chiefs of Staff. While in this position, he represented the Joint Chiefs of Staff on a special continental defense subcommittee of the National Security Council.

Robbins was deputy commander and later commander of the 20th Tactical Fighter Wing in England from July 1957 to August 1961. In 1960, he led the U.S. Air Force European Gunnery Champions to the "William Tell" weaponry meet in Nevada, flying F-100s aircraft across the Atlantic to participate.

In July 1962, he graduated from the National War College and was named director of USAF flight safety. In January 1963, he became the director of aerospace safety at Norton Air Force Base. Robbins became commander of the 313th Air Division in July 1965. In March 1967, he was named chief of staff, Pacific Air Forces, with headquarters at Hickam Air Force Base, Hawaii.

From July 1968 to February 1970, Robbins was the commander of the Twelfth Air Force at Bergstrom Air Force Base. In February 1970, he was named vice commander, Tactical Air Command at Langley Air Force Base. In August 1972, he became vice commander of Military Airlift Command (MAC). He retired from the Air Force in 1974.

Robbins died in 2001 at the age of 81. He was buried with full military honors at Fort Sam Houston National Cemetery.

== Awards and decorations ==
During his lengthy career, Robbins earned many decorations, including:

USAF Command pilot badge
Distinguished Service Cross with bronze oak leaf cluster	Air Force Distinguished Service Medal with two bronze oak leaf clusters	
Silver Star with bronze oak leaf cluster	Legion of Merit with bronze oak leaf cluster	Distinguished Flying Cross with three bronze oak leaf clusters
Air Medal with silver and bronze oak leaf clusters	Air Force Commendation Medal with bronze oak leaf cluster	Air Presidential Unit Citation
Air Force Outstanding Unit Award with bronze oak leaf cluster	American Defense Service Medal	American Campaign Medal
Asiatic-Pacific Campaign Medal with three bronze campaign stars	World War II Victory Medal	National Defense Service Medal with service star
Vietnam Service Medal with bronze campaign star	Air Force Longevity Service Award with one silver and two bronze oak leaf clusters	Philippine Liberation Medal

=== Distinguished Service Cross citation (1st Award) ===

Robbins, Jay T.
First Lieutenant (Air Corps), U.S. Army Air Forces
80th Fighter Squadron, 8th Fighter Group, 5th Air Force
Date of Action: September 4, 1943

Citation:

The President of the United States of America, authorized by Act of Congress July 9, 1918, takes pleasure in presenting the Distinguished Service Cross to First Lieutenant (Air Corps) Jay Thorpe Robbins, United States Army Air Forces, for extraordinary heroism in connection with military operations against an armed enemy while serving as Pilot of a P-38 Fighter Airplane in the 80th Fighter Squadron, 8th Fighter Group, Fifth Air Force, in aerial combat against enemy forces on 4 September 1943. On this date First Lieutenant Robbins shot down four enemy aircraft in a single mission. First Lieutenant Robbins' unquestionable valor in aerial combat is in keeping with the highest traditions of the military service and reflects great credit upon himself, the 5th Air Force, and the United States Army Air Forces.

=== Distinguished Service Cross citation (2nd Award) ===

Robbins, Jay T.
First Lieutenant (Air Corps), U.S. Army Air Forces
80th Fighter Squadron, 8th Fighter Group, 5th Air Force
Date of Action: October 24, 1943

Citation:

The President of the United States of America, authorized by Act of Congress July 9, 1918, takes pleasure in presenting a Bronze Oak Leaf Cluster in lieu of a Second Award of the Distinguished Service Cross to First Lieutenant (Air Corps) Jay Thorpe Robbins, United States Army Air Forces, for extraordinary heroism in connection with military operations against an armed enemy while serving as Pilot of a P-38 Fighter Airplane in the 80th Fighter Squadron, 8th Fighter Group, Fifth Air Force, in aerial combat against enemy forces on 24 October 1943. On this date, for the second time in less than two month, First Lieutenant Robbins shot down four enemy aircraft in a single mission. First Lieutenant Robbins' unquestionable valor in aerial combat is in keeping with the highest traditions of the military service and reflects great credit upon himself, the 5th Air Force, and the United States Army Air Forces.
