= Coolidge Independent School District =

School district in Texas

Coordinates: 31.7472°N 96.6556°W

Coolidge ISD

Address
- 1002 Kirven Street Coolidge, Limestone County, Texas, 76635; United States

District information
- Type: Public
- Grades: PK-12

Students and staff
- Enrollment: 309 (2017-2018)
- Faculty: 57
- Athletic conference: UIL Class 1A
- District mascot: Yellowjacket
- Colors: Yellow, Black, White, Gray

Other information
- Website: www.coolidgeisd.org

Coolidge Independent School District is a public school district based in Coolidge, Texas (USA).

In 2009, the school district was rated "academically acceptable" by the Texas Education Agency.

== Schools ==
- Coolidge Elementary (Grades PK-5)
- Coolidge Junior/Senior High (Grades 6-12)

== Academics ==
In the 2018-19 school year, Coolidge High School had an average SAT score of 981 out of 1600, and an average ACT score of 16.0 out of 36, both below state average (of 1027 and 20.6, respectively). For that same school year, Coolidge HS earned a "B"-grade overall accountability rating from the Texas Education Agency, while Coolidge Elementary School earned an "A"-grade on the same.

As of the 2020-21 school year, Coolidge ISD allows corporal punishment as a consequence for significant student misconduct, as do most public school districts in Texas. According to the district's student handbook, such punishment is administered only if the student's parents had agreed to corporal punishment at the start of the school year, is reported on the student's record, and is limited to "three swats" per offense. In the survey year 2017, the US Department of Education reported that there were 18 total incidents of corporal punishment in Coolidge ISD and 10 out of school suspensions for the district's 308 students. This rate of incidence of corporal punishment is higher than the Texas state average, where in 2015-16 about 0.3% of students state-wide received corporal punishment.

== Extracurricular activities ==
The Coolidge ISD offers the following athletic activities for junior and senior high school students:

Junior and Senior High

- Six-man football
- Volleyball
- Cross country
- Basketball
- Track and Field

Senior High only

- Baseball
- Softball
- Marching Band

== Notable people ==
Physician and educator E. Donnall Thomas graduated from Coolidge High School around 1937. In 1990 he was awarded the Nobel Prize in Physiology or Medicine along with Joseph Murray for organ and cell transplantation techniques. He was a primary developer of bone marrow transplantation for the treatment of leukemia.

== See also ==
- List of school districts in Texas
