= Coolidge, Texas =

- Town
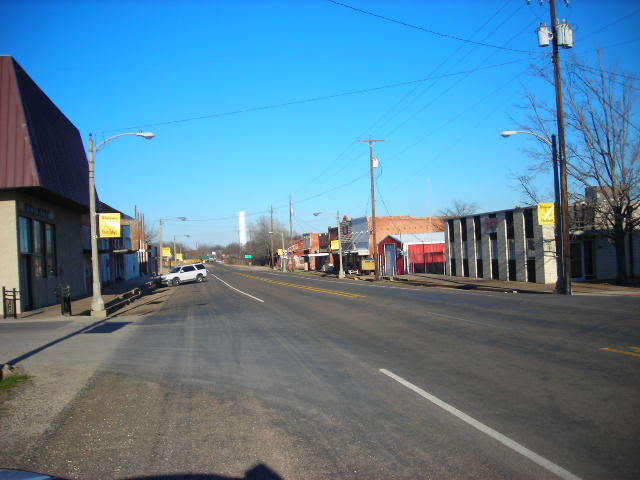
- Downtown Coolidge

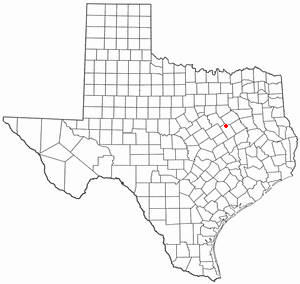
- Location of Coolidge, Texas

- Coordinates: 31°45′9″N 96°39′2″W
- Country: United States
- State: Texas
- County: Limestone
- Established: 1903

Area
  - Total: 0.98 sq mi (2.55 km^{2})
  - Land: 0.95 sq mi (2.46 km^{2})
  - Water: 0.035 sq mi (0.09 km^{2})
- Elevation: 535 ft (163 m)

Population (2020)
  - Total: 778
  - Density: 1,006/sq mi (388.4/km^{2})
- Time zone: UTC-6 (Central (CST))
  - Summer (DST): UTC-5 (CDT)
- ZIP code: 76635
- Area code: 254
- FIPS code: 48-16552
- GNIS feature ID: 1373194
- Website: www.cityofcoolidgetx.com

Coolidge is a town in Limestone County, Texas, United States, established in 1903. The population was 778 at the 2020 census.

== History ==
The town of Coolidge was established in 1903 by the Trinity and Brazos Valley Railway of Texas, as it was laying down rail between Hillsboro and Mexia. The same rail line was also responsible for the growth of nearby Tehuacana, itself established in 1847. Coolidge lost its rail service in 1942, though the depot remained and was later restored into a visitor center. Historically, the town's main industry was cotton farming, though it was largely replaced with cattle ranching by the mid-20th century, as with most of the surrounding area.

== Geography ==
Coolidge is located at 31°45′9″N 96°39′2″W (31.752609, –96.650524).

According to the United States Census Bureau, the town has a total area of 1.0 square mile (2.6 km^{2}), of which 1.0 square mile (2.6 km^{2}) is land and 0.04 square miles (0.10 km^{2}) (3.00%) is water.

== Demographics ==
Historical population
| Census | Pop. | Note | %± |
|---|---|---|---|
| 1910 | 505 | | — |
| 1970 | 786 | | — |
| 1980 | 810 | | 3.1% |
| 1990 | 748 | | −7.7% |
| 2000 | 848 | | 13.4% |
| 2010 | 955 | | 12.6% |
| 2020 | 778 | | −18.5% |
U.S. Decennial Census

Coolidge racial composition as of 2020 (NH = Non-Hispanic) (Note: Note: the US Census treats Hispanic/Latino as an ethnic category. This table excludes Latinos from the racial categories and assigns them to a separate category. Hispanics/Latinos can be of any race.)
| Race | Number | Percentage |
|---|---|---|
| White (NH) | 223 | 28.66% |
| Black or African American (NH) | 147 | 18.89% |
| Native American or Alaska Native (NH) | 9 | 1.16% |
| Asian (NH) | 1 | 0.13% |
| Mixed/Multi-Racial (NH) | 16 | 2.06% |
| Hispanic or Latino | 382 | 49.1% |
| Total | 778 | |

As of the 2020 United States census, there were 778 people, 327 households, and 244 families residing in the town.

As of the census of 2000, there were 848 people, 305 households, and 208 families residing in the town. The population density was 878.6 inhabitants per square mile (339.2/km^{2}). There were 339 housing units at an average density of 351.2 per square mile (135.6/km^{2}). The racial makeup of the town was 62.38% White, 18.63% African American, 0.59% Native American, 0.12% Asian, 15.45% from other races, and 2.83% from two or more races. There were 305 households, out of which 39.3% had children under the age of 18 living with them, 47.2% were married couples living together, 15.7% had a female householder with no husband present, and 31.8% were non-families. 29.2% of all households were made up of individuals, and 15.7% had someone living alone who was 65 years of age or older. The average household size was 2.78 and the average family size was 3.38.

In the town, the population was spread out, with 31.3% under the age of 18, 11.8% from 18 to 24, 26.9% from 25 to 44, 16.9% from 45 to 64, and 13.2% who were 65 years of age or older. The median age was 30 years. For every 100 females, there were 93.6 males. For every 100 females age 18 and over, there were 95.6 males.

The median income for a household in the town was $23,558, and the median income for a family was $27,583. Males had a median income of $24,896 versus $17,132 for females. The per capita income for the town was $11,589. About 23.6% of families and 25.2% of the population were below the poverty line, including 26.4% of those under age 18 and 11.9% of those age 65 or over.

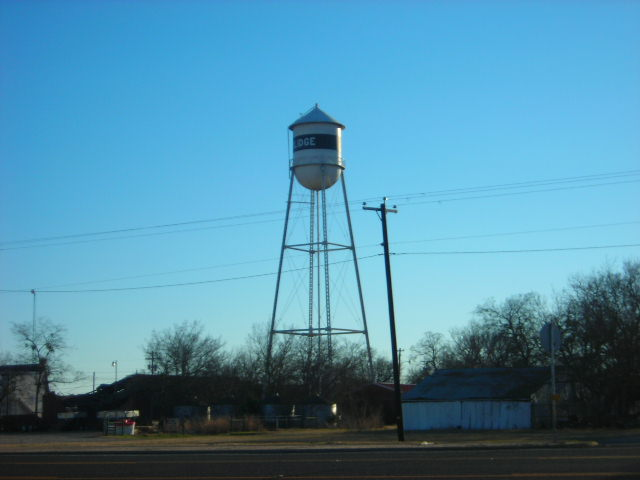
The Coolidge water tower

== Education ==
The town is served by the Coolidge Independent School District.

== Notable people ==
- Jay T. Robbins, US Air Force Lieutenant General; World War II fighter ace (22 kills, Pacific Theater)
- E. Donnall Thomas, 1990 Nobel Prize-winning physician, graduated from Coolidge Senior High School
- Ann Williams, dancer, born in Coolidge
