= Groesbeck High School =

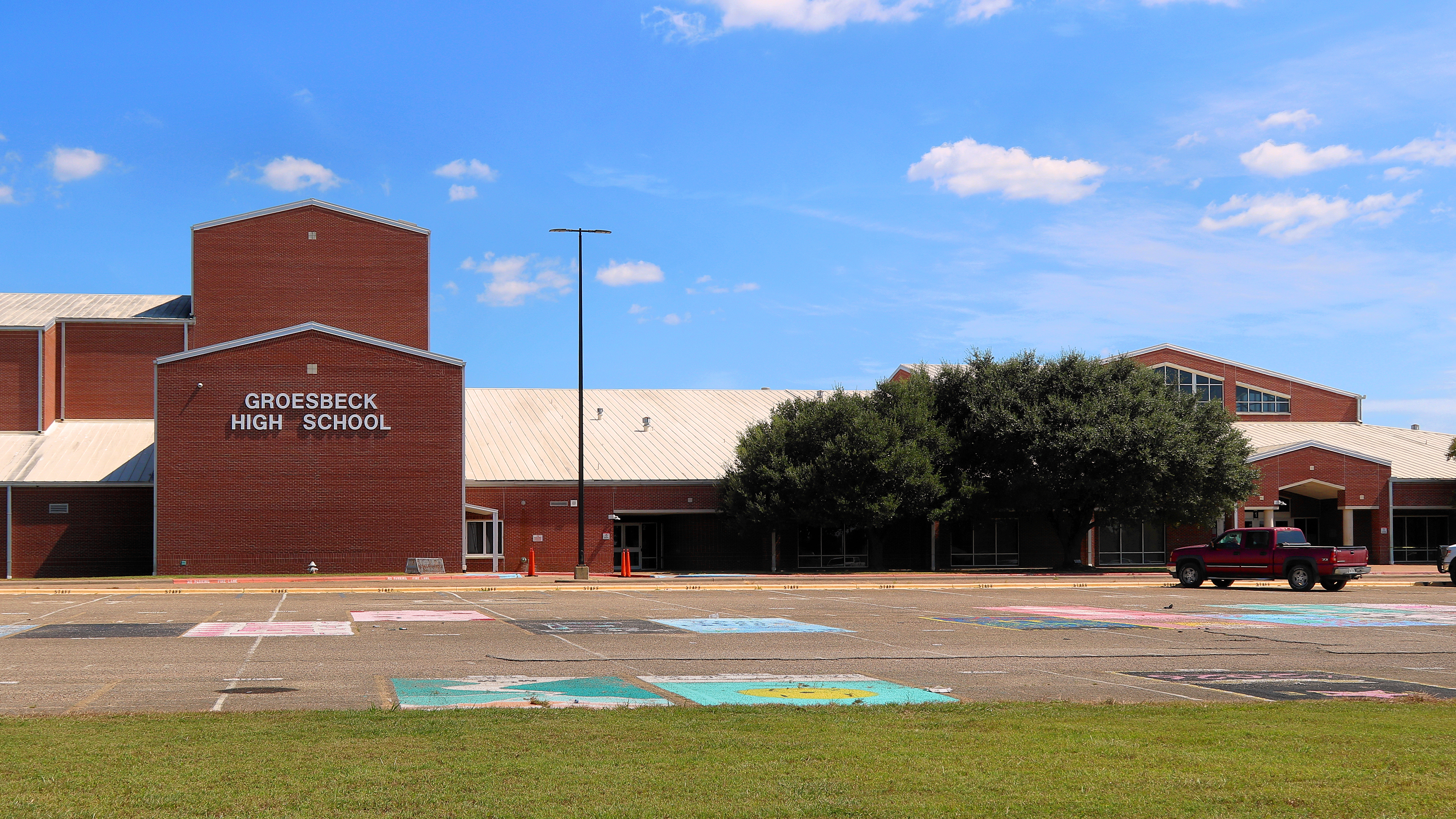

Location
- 1202 N. Ellis St. Groesbeck, Texas 76642; United States; 31.5391°N 96.5243°W

Information
- School type: Public high school
- Motto: Every Kid A Winner
- School district: Groesbeck Independent School District
- Principal: Cannon Kortis
- Teaching staff: 38.77 (FTE)
- Grades: 9-12
- Enrollment: 499 (2023–2024)
- Student to teacher ratio: 12.87
- Colors: Red, gray and white
- Athletics conference: UIL Class AAA
- Nickname: Goats/Lady Goats
- Newspaper: Groesbeck Journal
- Yearbook: The Taog
- Website: www.groesbeckisd.net/o/ghs/

Groesbeck High School is a public high school located in the city of Groesbeck, Texas, United States. It is classified as a 3A school by the UIL. It is a part of the Groesbeck Independent School District located in central Limestone County. In 2015, the school was rated "Met Standard" by the Texas Education Agency.

== Athletics ==
The Groesbeck Goats competes in volleyball, cross country, football, basketball, tennis, track, baseball, softball and golf.

=== State Champions ===
- Football
  - 1991 (3A)
- Girls' basketball
  - 1996 (3A)
- Girls' track
  - 1996 (3A)

==== State Finalists ====
- Boys' basketball
  - 1992 (3A)
- Girls' basketball
  - 1984 (3A)

== Academics ==
- UIL Team Debate Champions
  - 1964 (1A)
- UIL Team Spelling Champions
  - 2014 (3A)
- UIL State Marching Champions
  - 2004 (3A)
- 1st Place Drums Along The Brazos (3A)
