= Groesbeck, Texas =

Town in Texas, United States

- City
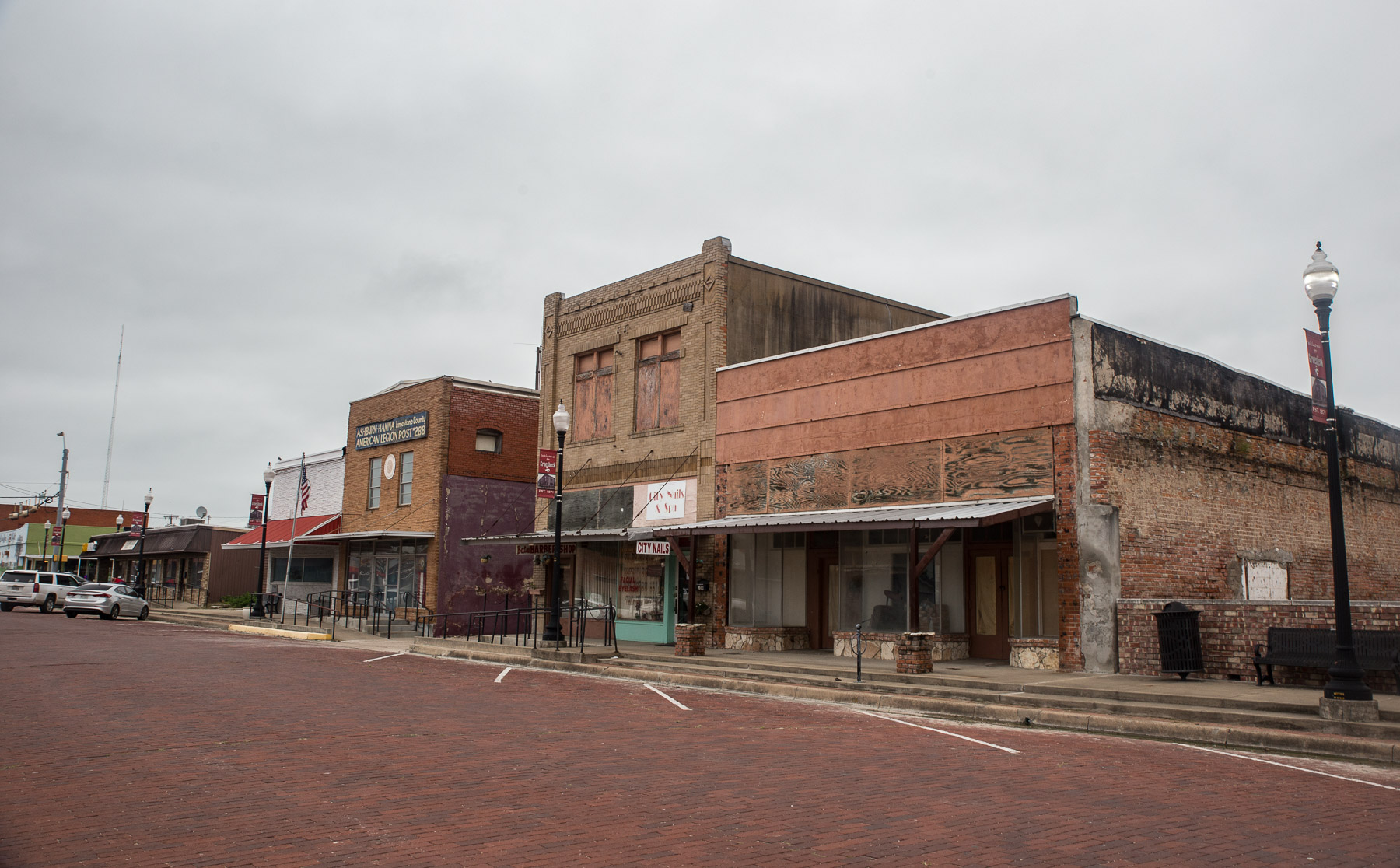
- Motto: The Friendly City
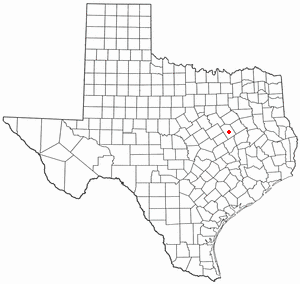
- Location of Groesbeck, Texas

- Coordinates: 31°31′22″N 96°31′56″W
- Country: United States
- State: Texas
- County: Limestone

Government
  - Mayor: Matthew Dawley

Area
  - Total: 4.37 sq mi (11.33 km^{2})
  - Land: 4.34 sq mi (11.24 km^{2})
  - Water: 0.035 sq mi (0.09 km^{2})
- Elevation: 660 ft (200 m)

Population (2020)
  - Total: 3,631
  - Density: 980.2/sq mi (378.44/km^{2})
- Time zone: UTC-6 (Central (CST))
  - Summer (DST): UTC-5 (CDT)
- ZIP code: 76642
- Area code: 254
- FIPS code: 48-31280
- GNIS feature ID: 1358461
- Website: www.cityofgroesbeck.com

Groesbeck (/ɡroʊzbɛk/ GROWS-beck) is a city in and the county seat of Limestone County, Texas, United States. Located along Texas State Highway 14 and Texas State Highway 164, it sits in the northern part of the Texas Triangle. Its population was 3,631 at the 2020 census.

== History ==
The Tawakoni, who are part of the Wichita people, are attested to be living between the Trinity and Brazos Rivers since at least 1768.

=== European colonization ===
Limestone County was a part of the empresario grants given out by the government of Coahuila y Tejas, with Haden Edwards given permission to settle an area including most of Limestone County in 1825, but the Mexican government legally forbade Anglo-Americans from settling into Mexican Texas after the Law of April 6, 1830. Settlement continued, however, including in 1833, when a group of Anglos from Illinois settled Fort Parker, the earliest known European settlement in the vicinity. Numerous Mexican and Anglo settlers made land claims in the area before 1836. After 1836, due in part to the Fort Parker massacre and ongoing violence in between settlers and natives in Limestone County, the newly established Republic of Texas forbade new settlement until the Treaty of Tehuacana Creek in 1844. In the mid-1840s, two more towns were founded before on April 11, 1846, Limestone County was formed from Robertson's Colony, with Springfield being named county seat. As of 1860, its population was 3,464 Whites, 1,072 slaves, and a free Black woman. In 1861, 98% of voters in Limestone County voted to secede and join the Confederate States of America.

=== Fort Parker ===
Fort Parker State Park, located north of Groesbeck, is preserved to tell the story of Cynthia Ann Parker, who was captured by Comanches, and became the mother of Quanah Parker, the last Comanche chief.

=== Reconstruction ===
After the Civil War, in June 1865, the Emancipation Proclamation was read from the front porch of the largest slaveholder in the county, Logan Stroud, who held over 150 people in bondage. Four future African-American Texas legislators were freed in Limestone County that day, Ralph Long, Sheppard Mullins, and David Medlock Jr., and Giles Cotton, who were freed from Stroud's estate.

"Ecstasy! Banjos twanged as couples danced and women laughed and children shouted. Grown men wept and jubilation reigned. Release! Liberty! Deliverance!"

Juneteenth has been celebrated since then in Booker T. Washington Park along Lake Mexia, with early crowds reaching 20,000 as they listened to passionate speeches by local preachers and politicians. Separately, White veterans of the Civil War began their own summer gathering nearby at Confederate Reunion Grounds State Historic Site, with theirs peaking at 5,000 in attendance.

During the Reconstruction era, Limestone County experienced heightened racial tensions. In June 1867, Limestone County was assigned a Freedmen's Bureau agent, who was shot and killed within 6 months of his arrival. In October 1872, a Mexican man, accused of theft, was lynched by several vigilantes in Groesbeck.

=== Groesbeck Riot of 1871 ===
On September 30, 1871, in Groesbeck, two Black police officers went to arrest a White man committing a crime, when the White man pulled out a gun, and was then shot and killed in a firefight. The police officers, understanding the immediate threat to their lives, fled to the mayor's office. Soon after the town had gathered around the scene, a man rode in on horseback claiming "one-hundred armed blacks" were heading towards Groesbeck. The mayor, Adolph Zadek, was threatened with his life by a mob of armed Whites to call all citizens to arms and to issue arrest warrants for the two Black officers. Shortly after, the mob appointed a new mayor and used their new-found authority to expropriate 30 weapons from a local store. At this point, the mob numbered about 600-800 men. The two Black police officers escaped the mob, but were arrested the next morning and put under the protection of the state guard. Blacks were prevented from voting in Limestone County during this period due to threats of violence, but this was especially relevant in the election of 1871, which occurred just a few days later on October 3.

"Words had passed through the county that Blacks and [Republicans] would be killed if they attempted to vote. Blacks who did go to the polls were told to go home." Communication with the capital were slow since riotous citizens cut the telegraph lines.

Having finally heard news of what was taking place, Governor Edmund J. Davis petitioned the US Department of War for aid, and General John F. Reynolds personally responded. Governor Davis also placed Limestone County under martial law and sent the state police captain and a major general commanding a combined force of hundreds of armed men, although by the time they arrived, the elections had passed. The state faced resistance from local officials, but the rioting was calmed by this show of force. On November 6, the Texas House of Representatives voted that the declaration of martial law was illegal, and civil authority was restored on November 9, 1871.

=== Early days ===
The Houston and Texas Central Railway extended from Houston to Groesbeck by the end of 1870. Groesbeck was incorporated in April 1871, and by the end of 1872, Groesbeck had rail connections to Waco and Dallas, and trains on the way from St. Louis to Houston began passing through in 1880. Springfield was bypassed by the railroad and the courthouse burned down in 1873, so Groesbeck was made county seat in 1874. Railroads in the late 19th century were a booming industry. The end of reconstruction and the advent of the railroad began an era of growth for the county. The population in Limestone County was 9,000 in 1870, and 32,000 in 1900. Groesbeck itself grew from 663 to 1,462 between 1890 and 1900.

=== Discovery of oil and natural gas ===
In 1912, natural gas was discovered in the Mexia-Groesbeck area, and finding oil in the area also was thought to be possible. In October 1920, Col. A.E. Humphreys completed an oil well begun by the Mexia Oil and Gas Company and discovered oil at a depth of 3100 feet. A proper well was set up and producing 4000 barrels a day by the summer of 1921. The discovery was notable because it was the first discovery of oil fields formed by the Cenomanian-era Woodbine Group geologic formation. This encouraged future exploration in the Woodbine sand, leading to the discovery of many other Woodbine fields, including the giant East Texas Oil Field, which was discovered in 1930. By January 1922, $5 million had been invested in Mexia and 5 million barrels of oil had been extracted. On January 12, martial law was declared for the second time in Limestone County history due to open and flagrant violation of the law, highway robberies, open gambling, and selling of liquor. The oil discovery brought wealth to the area, but in Groesbeck, natural gas was more commonly extracted due to the lack of suitable oil deposits. After 1922 however, production of oil and natural gas declined rapidly. By 1927 most of the heavy oil extraction was finished in Limestone county, but the formations remain useful for paleobiologists.

The oil boom led to many trusses being built in the area. This type of bridge, popular among Texans in the early 20th century, is a rare sight now. Seven trusses, all built in the 1920s, survive in their original locations in Limestone County as of 2025.

=== The Great Depression ===
The Great Depression had a major effect on Groesbeck. In 1930, the population of Limestone County had reached its peak of nearly 40,000, with over 6,000 farms. By 1940, however, that had fallen to 34,000 people and 3,400 farms, and the number of businesses was cut in half. The Civilian Conservation Corps and Works Progress Administration helped ease unemployment and built Fort Parker State Park.

=== Postwar years ===
In 1960, the population of Groesbeck was 2,500. The housing situation was critical since over 55% of citizens were low-income, and with only 34 vacant housing units. In 1962, the Groesbeck Housing Authority was created by mayor George Koch, and the city began plans to construct low-income housing. In August 1964, the Groesbeck Housing Authority approved plans for Liberty Village and Liberty Square apartments, affordable housing units that were built on opposite ends of town.

“We are building the housing units because we have many citizens who are living in substandard housing. We have many retired people and other old-age citizens who are virtually living in slum areas.” - Mayor George Koch

The project was finished with 12 units in July 1965, and a policy of segregation was revealed to have been used in selecting tenants. The exact date of desegregation is not known, but it likely happened in response to the Fair Housing Act of 1968. The apartments were successful at housing elderly and low-income individuals, so the apartments were expanded and 15 more units finished construction in 1973. Both sites still function as government housing.

In August 1966, a team sent by the federal HEW Department investigated Groesbeck ISD and found they had maintained a segregated school system for 12 years after Brown v. Board of Education, and that facilities in the all-White school were "vastly superior". Within two weeks of federal intervention, 22 Black students transferred within the district. Longtime district superintendent H.O. Whitehurst resigned the same year, after 35 years. Full integration was not achieved until the 1969–70 school year. The 1969 class of Washington High School was the last segregated graduating class in Groesbeck.

In 1979, NRG Energy proposed construction of a $1.6 billion coal-burning power plant near Groesbeck. It finished construction in 1985. The power plant increased the tax base and brought many jobs to Groesbeck. Between 1985 and 1989, Groesbeck ISD spent $18 million constructing new elementary and high schools, and in 1991, the high school football team went undefeated and claimed the 3-A championship. After 1993, the Texas Legislature enacted the Robin Hood plan, which redistributes the taxes earned from the power plant more equitably across Texas school districts.

== Geography ==
Groesbeck is located at 31°31′22″N 96°31′56″W (31.522907, –96.532125).

According to the United States Census Bureau, the city has a total area of 3.8 sq mi (9.8 km^{2}), almost all land (0.27% covered by water).

The community is located at the junction of State Highways 14 and 164.

Groesbeck is the closest town to historic Old Fort Parker. The fort holds an annual Christmas event at the site every December. The original fort has been rebuilt on the original site to the original specifications.

== Demographics ==
Historical population
| Census | Pop. | Note | %± |
|---|---|---|---|
| 1880 | 402 | | — |
| 1890 | 663 | | 64.9% |
| 1900 | 1,462 | | 120.5% |
| 1910 | 1,454 | | −0.5% |
| 1920 | 1,522 | | 4.7% |
| 1930 | 2,059 | | 35.3% |
| 1940 | 2,272 | | 10.3% |
| 1950 | 2,182 | | −4.0% |
| 1960 | 2,498 | | 14.5% |
| 1970 | 2,396 | | −4.1% |
| 1980 | 3,373 | | 40.8% |
| 1990 | 3,185 | | −5.6% |
| 2000 | 4,291 | | 34.7% |
| 2010 | 4,328 | | 0.9% |
| 2020 | 3,631 | | −16.1% |
U.S. Decennial Census

=== Racial and ethnic composition ===
Groesbeck city, Texas – Racial and ethnic composition Note: the US Census treats Hispanic/Latino as an ethnic category. This table excludes Latinos from the racial categories and assigns them to a separate category. Hispanics/Latinos may be of any race.
| Race / Ethnicity (NH = Non-Hispanic) | Pop 2000 | Pop 2010 | Pop 2020 | % 2000 | % 2010 | % 2020 |
|---|---|---|---|---|---|---|
| White alone (NH) | 2,407 | 2,475 | 1,921 | 56.09% | 57.19% | 52.91% |
| Black or African American alone (NH) | 1,061 | 857 | 703 | 24.73% | 19.80% | 19.36% |
| Native American or Alaska Native alone (NH) | 16 | 9 | 9 | 0.37% | 0.21% | 0.25% |
| Asian alone (NH) | 2 | 11 | 33 | 0.05% | 0.25% | 0.91% |
| Native Hawaiian or Pacific Islander alone (NH) | 0 | 0 | 0 | 0.00% | 0.00% | 0.00% |
| Other race alone (NH) | 1 | 11 | 6 | 0.02% | 0.25% | 0.17% |
| Mixed race or Multiracial (NH) | 52 | 62 | 113 | 1.21% | 1.43% | 3.11% |
| Hispanic or Latino (any race) | 752 | 903 | 846 | 17.53% | 20.86% | 23.30% |
| Total | 4,291 | 4,328 | 3,631 | 100.00% | 100.00% | 100.00% |

=== 2020 census ===
As of the 2020 census, Groesbeck had a population of 3,631 and a median age of 37.0 years; 24.8% of the residents were under 18 and 16.1% were 65 or older. For every 100 females, there were 101.2 males, and for every 100 females 18 and over, there were 100.1 males 18 and over.

Of the 1,233 households in Groesbeck, 37.7% had children under 18 living in them, 40.3% were married-couple households, 15.7% were households with a male householder and no spouse or partner present, and 38.4% were households with a female householder and no spouse or partner present. About 28.8% of all households were made up of individuals, and 14.6% had someone living alone who was 65 or older. The city had 1,450 housing units, of which 15.0% were vacant. The homeowner vacancy rate was 3.2% and the rental vacancy rate was 13.0%.

None of the residents lived in urban areas, while 100.0% lived in rural areas.

Racial composition as of the 2020 census
| Race | Number | Percentage |
|---|---|---|
| White | 2,216 | 61.0% |
| Black or African American | 719 | 19.8% |
| American Indian and Alaska Native | 33 | 0.9% |
| Asian | 34 | 0.9% |
| Some other race | 361 | 9.9% |
| Two or more races | 268 | 7.4% |

=== 2010 census ===
At the 2010 census, 4,328 people, 1,286 households, and 864 families lived in the city. The population density was 989 people/sq mi (382/km^{2}). The 1,473 housing units averaged 336.8/s mi (130/km^{2}). The racial makeup of the city was 65.36% White, 20.2% African American, 0.3% Native American, 0.03% Asian, 11.3% from other races, and 2.7% from two or more races. Hispanics or Latinos of any race were 20.9%.

Of the 1,286 households, 32.6% had children under 18 living with them, 45.8% were married couples living together, 17.0% had a female householder with no husband present, and 32.8% were not families. About 29.2% of households were one person and 13% were one person aged 65 or older. The average household size was 2.6, and the average family size was 3.25. The age distribution in the city was 24.6% under 18, 8.4% from 19 to 24, 32.6% from 25 to 44, 21.1% from 45 to 64, and 13.2% 65 or older. The median age was 34.4 years.

== Government ==
The City of Groesbeck is a type-A,general-law city. The current mayor is Matthew Dawley. The five current city council members are Tamika Jackson, Warren Anglin, Kim Harris, Sonia Selvera, and Lee Cox.

The main source of water for the city is the Navasota River.

== Library ==
The city of Groesbeck has one public library, located at 601 W. Yeagua St., also known as Texas SH 164.

== Education ==
The city of Groesbeck is served by the Groesbeck Independent School District, which includes five schools:

- Preschool
- H.O. Whitehurst
- Enge Washington
- Groesbeck Middle School
- Groesbeck High School

== Notable people ==
- Joe Don Baker, actor, was born in Groesbeck in 1936.
- Larry Dossey, physician, was born Groesbeck in 1940.
- Lafayette L. Foster, president of the A&M College of Texas, politician, and journalist, lived and was elected in Groesbeck.
- Clay Hammond, R&B singer and songwriter, was born in Groesbeck in 1936.
- John E. Hatley, a former master sergeant in the United States Army, is serving a 40-year sentence in the Fort Leavenworth Disciplinary Barracks for the murder of four Iraqi detainees. He attended high school in Groesbeck.
- Lenoy Jones, a National Football League (NFL) player, played for Groesbeck High School.
- Garland Roark, author (Wake of the Red Witch), was born in Groesbeck.
- Kenneth Sims, first overall selection in the 1982 NFL draft ad inducted into College Football Hall of Fame Class of 2021, played for Groesbeck High School.
- Frankie Smith, an NFL player, played for Groesbeck High School.
- John Westbrook was the first African American to play football in the Southwest Conference; he was born in Groesbeck in 1947.
