= Groesbeck Independent School District =

School district in Texas

Groesbeck Independent School District is a public school district based in Groesbeck, Texas, United States.

In addition to Groesbeck, the district serves the towns of Kosse and Thornton. Located in Limestone County, small portions of the district extend into Falls and Robertson Counties.

In 2008, Groesbeck ISD voters passed a $23 million bond to build a new 92,000 sq ft (8,500 m^{2}) intermediate school, and to give children in the school district access to their own laptop and equip every classroom as a 21st-century classroom with a mounted, LCD projector, document camera, speaker system, DVD/VCR player, and Eno Interactive Board.

In 2009, the school district was rated "academically acceptable" by the Texas Education Agency.

== Schools ==
- Groesbeck High School (grades 9-12)
- Groesbeck Middle (grades 7-8)
  - 1994-96 National Blue Ribbon School
- Groesbeck Elementary (prekindergarten - grade 6) – split into two campuses

- H.O. Whitehurst Campus (prekindergarten - grade 3)
- Enge-Washington Intermediate Campus (grades 4-6)
