= Thornton, Texas =

- Town
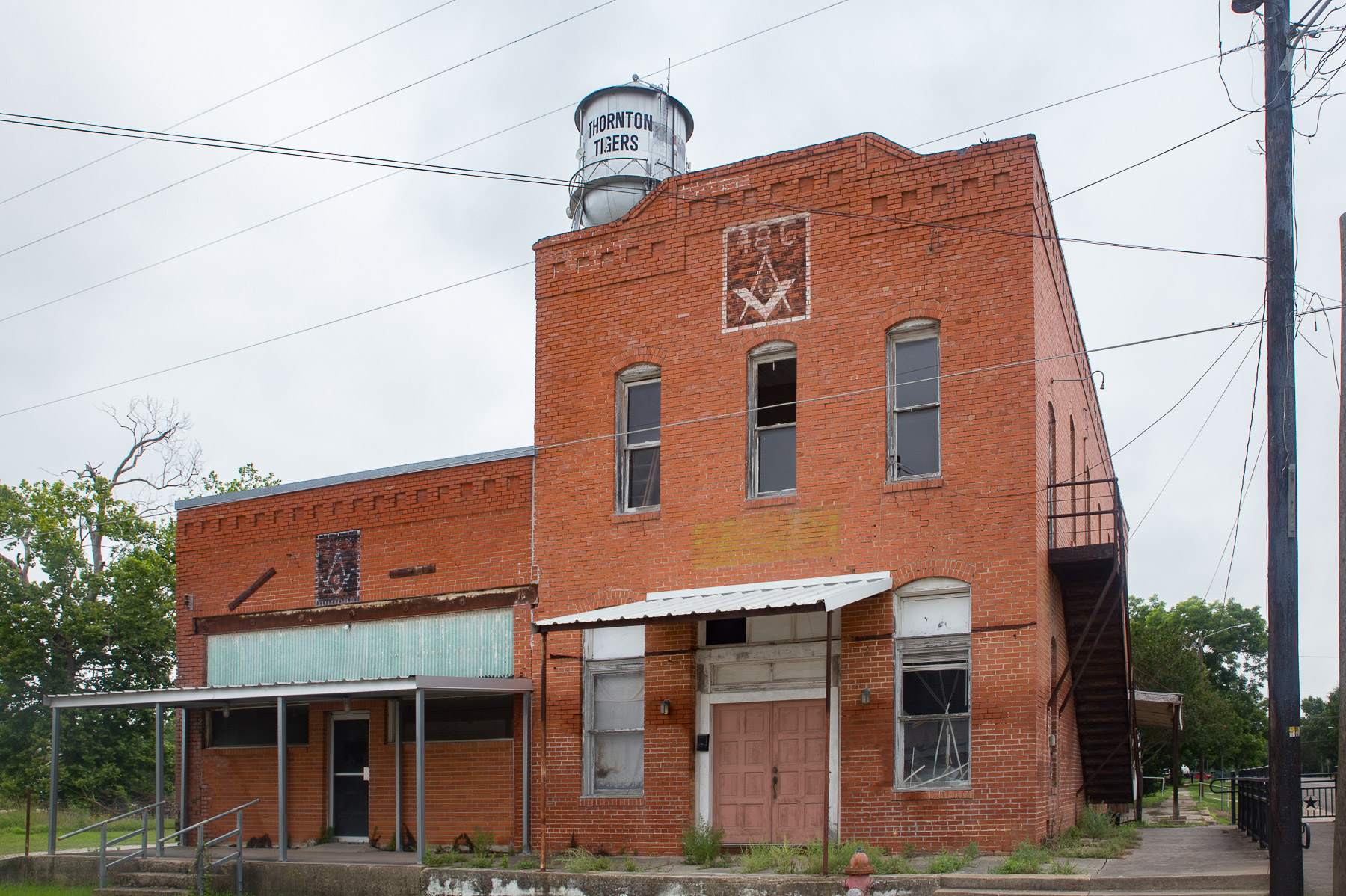
- Masonic building in Thornton, Texas

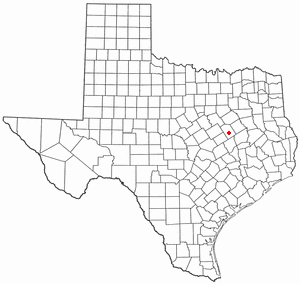
- Location of Thornton, Texas

- Coordinates: 31°24′36″N 96°34′25″W
- Country: United States
- State: Texas
- County: Limestone

Area
  - Total: 0.98 sq mi (2.55 km^{2})
  - Land: 0.98 sq mi (2.54 km^{2})
  - Water: 0.0039 sq mi (0.01 km^{2})
- Elevation: 490 ft (150 m)

Population (2020)
  - Total: 421
  - Density: 429/sq mi (166/km^{2})
- Time zone: UTC-6 (Central (CST))
  - Summer (DST): UTC-5 (CDT)
- ZIP code: 76687
- Area code: 254
- FIPS code: 48-72788
- GNIS feature ID: 1369866
- Website: cityofthorntontx.com

Thornton is a town in Limestone County, Texas, United States. The population was 421 at the 2020 census.

== Geography ==
Thornton is located at 31°24′36″N 96°34′25″W (31.409906, –96.573594).

According to the United States Census Bureau, the town has a total area of 1.0 square mile (2.6 km^{2}), of which 1.0 square mile (2.6 km^{2}) is land and 1.00% is water.

=== Climate ===
The climate in this area is characterized by hot, humid summers and generally mild to cool winters. According to the Köppen Climate Classification system, Thornton has a humid subtropical climate, abbreviated "Cfa" on climate maps.

== Demographics ==
Historical population
Census	Pop.	Note	%±
1880	182		—
1890	466		156.0%
1910	678		—
1920	733		8.1%
1930	739		0.8%
1940	745		0.8%
1950	623		−16.4%
1960	504		−19.1%
1970	433		−14.1%
1980	498		15.0%
1990	540		8.4%
2000	525		−2.8%
2010	526		0.2%
2020	421		−20.0%
U.S. Decennial Census; 2020 Census

As of the census of 2000, there were 525 people, 206 households, and 147 families residing in the town. The population density was 529.5 inhabitants per square mile (204.4/km^{2}). There were 248 housing units at an average density of 250.1 per square mile (96.6/km^{2}). The racial makeup of the town was 88.00% White, 6.48% African American, 0.95% Native American, 0.19% Asian, 2.86% from other races, and 1.52% from two or more races. Hispanic or Latino of any race were 8.00% of the population.

There were 206 households, out of which 32.0% had children under the age of 18 living with them, 55.8% were married couples living together, 8.7% had a female householder with no husband present, and 28.6% were non-families. 23.8% of all households were made up of individuals, and 13.1% had someone living alone who was 65 years of age or older. The average household size was 2.55 and the average family size was 3.04.

In the town, the population was spread out, with 28.2% under the age of 18, 5.5% from 18 to 24, 28.8% from 25 to 44, 21.9% from 45 to 64, and 15.6% who were 65 years of age or older. The median age was 37 years. For every 100 females, there were 98.1 males. For every 100 females age 18 and over, there were 96.4 males.

The median income for a household in the town was $26,607, and the median income for a family was $31,538. Males had a median income of $24,792 versus $20,000 for females. The per capita income for the town was $12,615. About 13.7% of families and 16.4% of the population were below the poverty line, including 15.5% of those under age 18 and 11.1% of those age 65 or over.

== Education ==
Thornton is served by the Groesbeck Independent School District.
