= Confederate Reunion Grounds State Historic Site =

Coordinates: 31.633°N 96.559°W

- Joseph E. Johnston Confederate Reunion Grounds
- U.S. National Register of Historic Places
- Texas State Historic Site
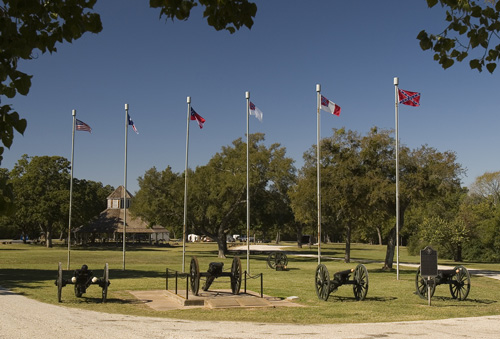
- Confederate Reunion Grounds in 2009

- Location within Texas Location within the United States
- Nearest city: Mexia, Texas
- Area: 70 acres (28 ha)
- Built: 1892
- Built by: Johansen
- Architectural style: Late Victorian
- Website: Confederate Reunion Grounds State Historic Site
- NRHP reference No.: 76002048

Significant dates
- Added to NRHP: April 2, 1976
- Designated TSHS: September 1983

Confederate Reunion Grounds is a Texas historic site located near Mexia, Limestone County, Texas at the confluence of the Navasota River and Jack's Creek. From 1889 to 1946, Confederate Civil War veterans and families reunited at the site during late-July or early-August, camping under the giant bur oaks, enjoying speeches, concerts, dances, fellowship and food, and raising funds for families of deceased soldiers.

Today, Confederate Reunion Grounds is operated by the Texas Historical Commission and is open to the public. Historic architectural attractions include the 1893 dance pavilion, entrance marker and iron archway, 1920s pump house, ruins of Miss Mamie Kennedy's “Delight House,” Colonel Humphrey's Arch and Spring, rock and concrete barbecue pits, and rock chimneys, ponds, fountains, cisterns and wells throughout the site. A Civil War-era cannon, “Old Val Verde,” is exhibited beneath the flagpoles at the center of the site near the intersection of Robert E. Lee and Stonewall Jackson Avenues. The cannon's history includes action for both Union and Confederate forces.

Picnic areas and walking trails, including a remnant of the brick “Old Coolidge–Reunion Grounds” Road, are available to visitors. Native vegetation and flora at the site provide shelter and home to an abundance of wildlife. The site is locally known for its fishing and also provides a kayak and canoe link to the Fort Parker State Park Lake along the Limestone Bluffs Paddling Trail.

== Gallery ==
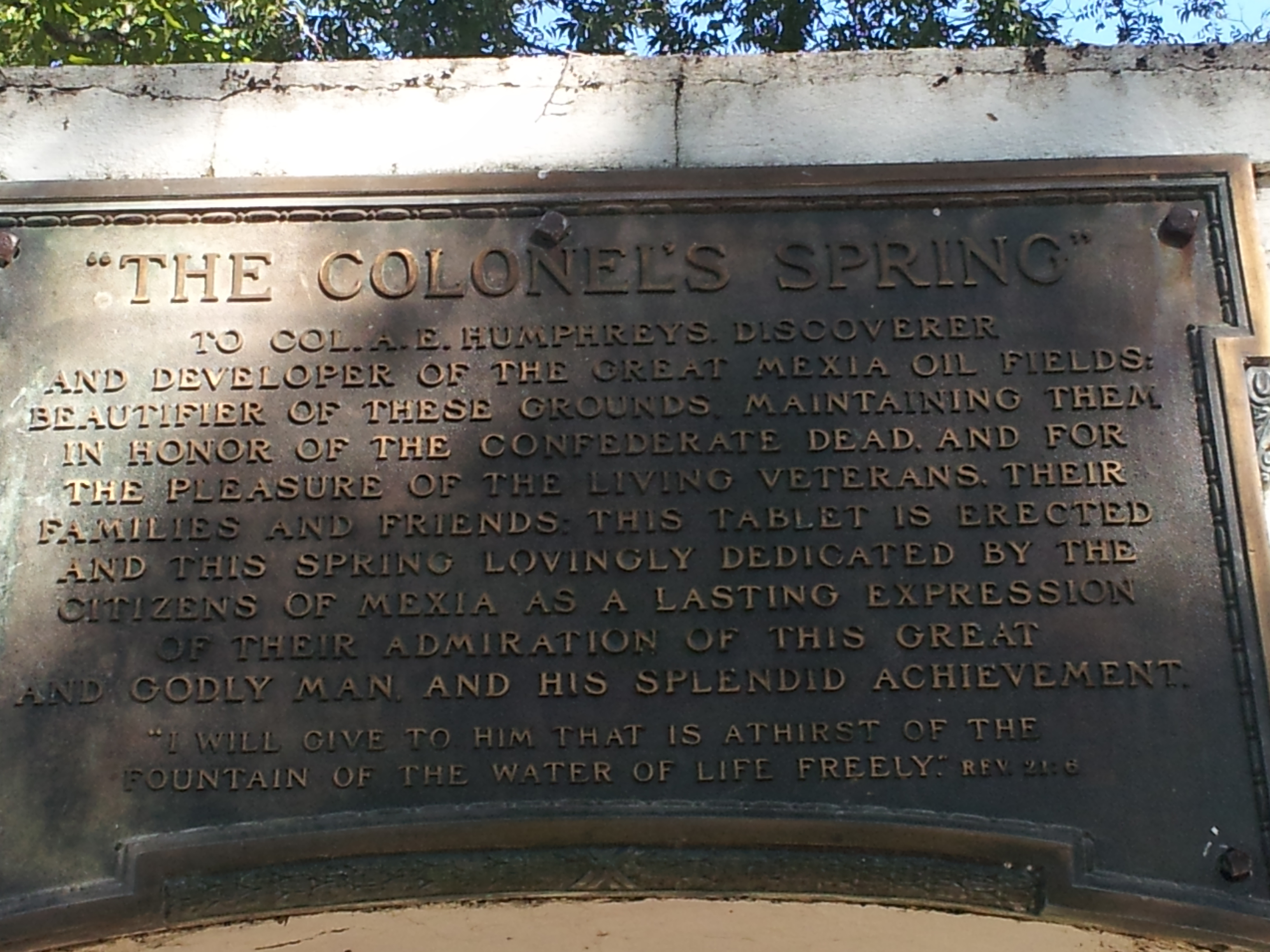
Colonel Humphrey's Spring

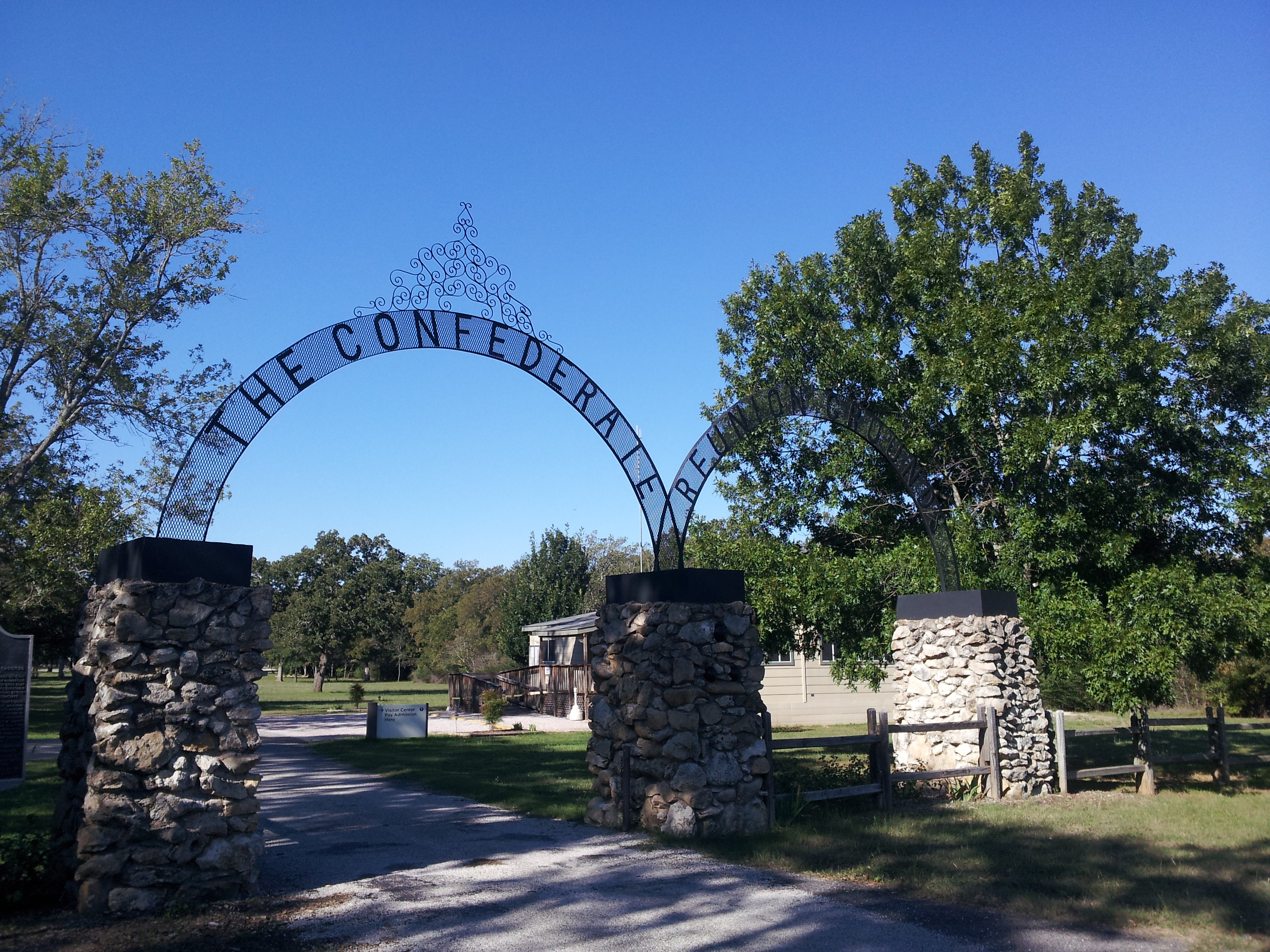
Entrance

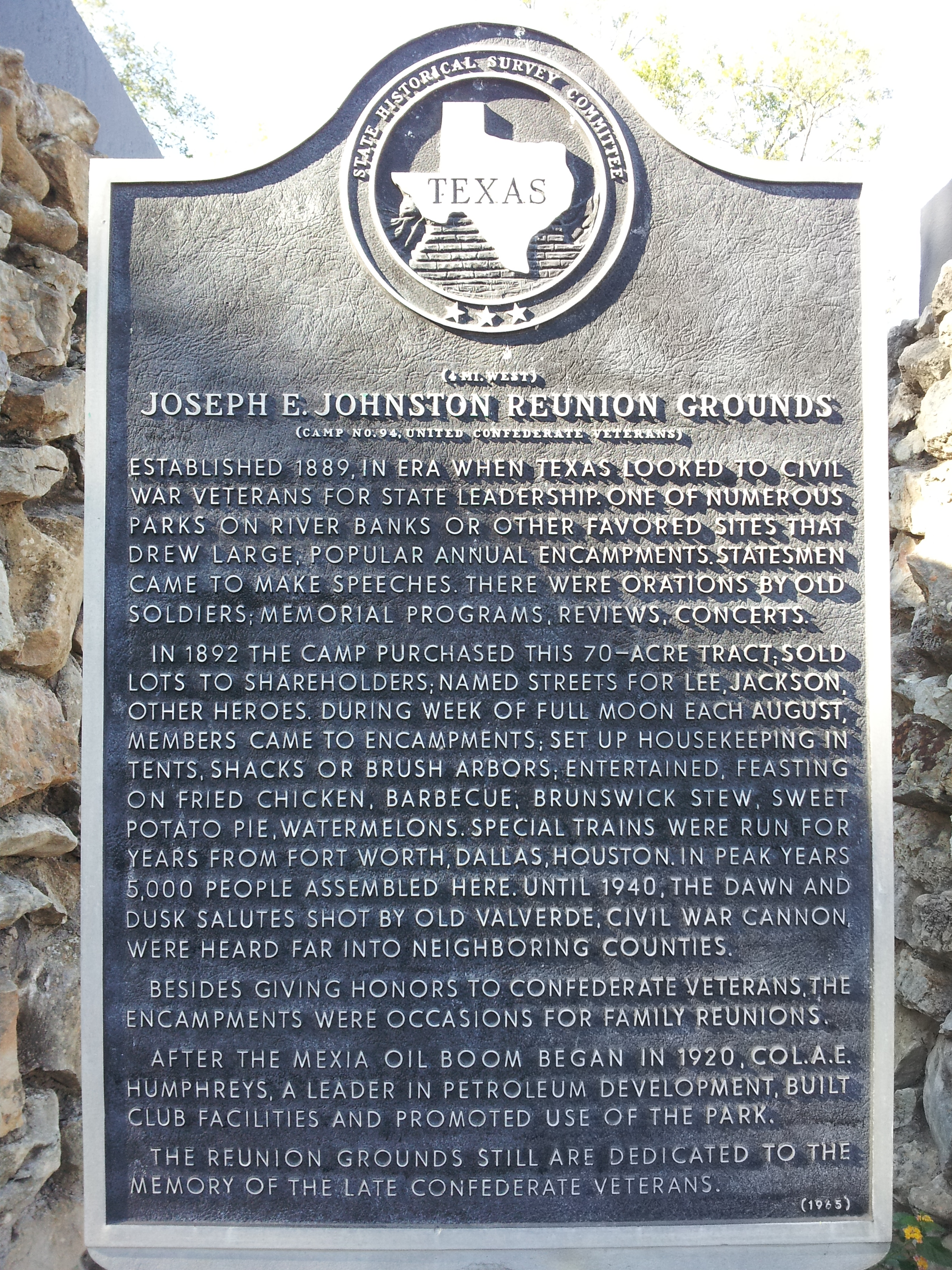
Texas Historical Marker

== See also ==
- List of Texas state historic sites
- National Register of Historic Places listings in Limestone County, Texas
