= Forest Glade, Texas =

- Unincorporated community
- Location in Texas Location in the United States
- Coordinates: 31°37′51″N 96°31′19″W
- Country: United States
- State: Texas
- County: Limestone

Population (2000)
  - Total: 340
- Time zone: UTC-6 (Central (CST))
  - Summer (DST): UTC-5 (CDT)
- GNIS feature ID: 1357557

Forest Glade is an unincorporated community in Limestone County, Texas, United States. According to the Handbook of Texas, the community had an estimated population of 340 in 2000.
