= Limestone County, Texas =

County in the United States

- County
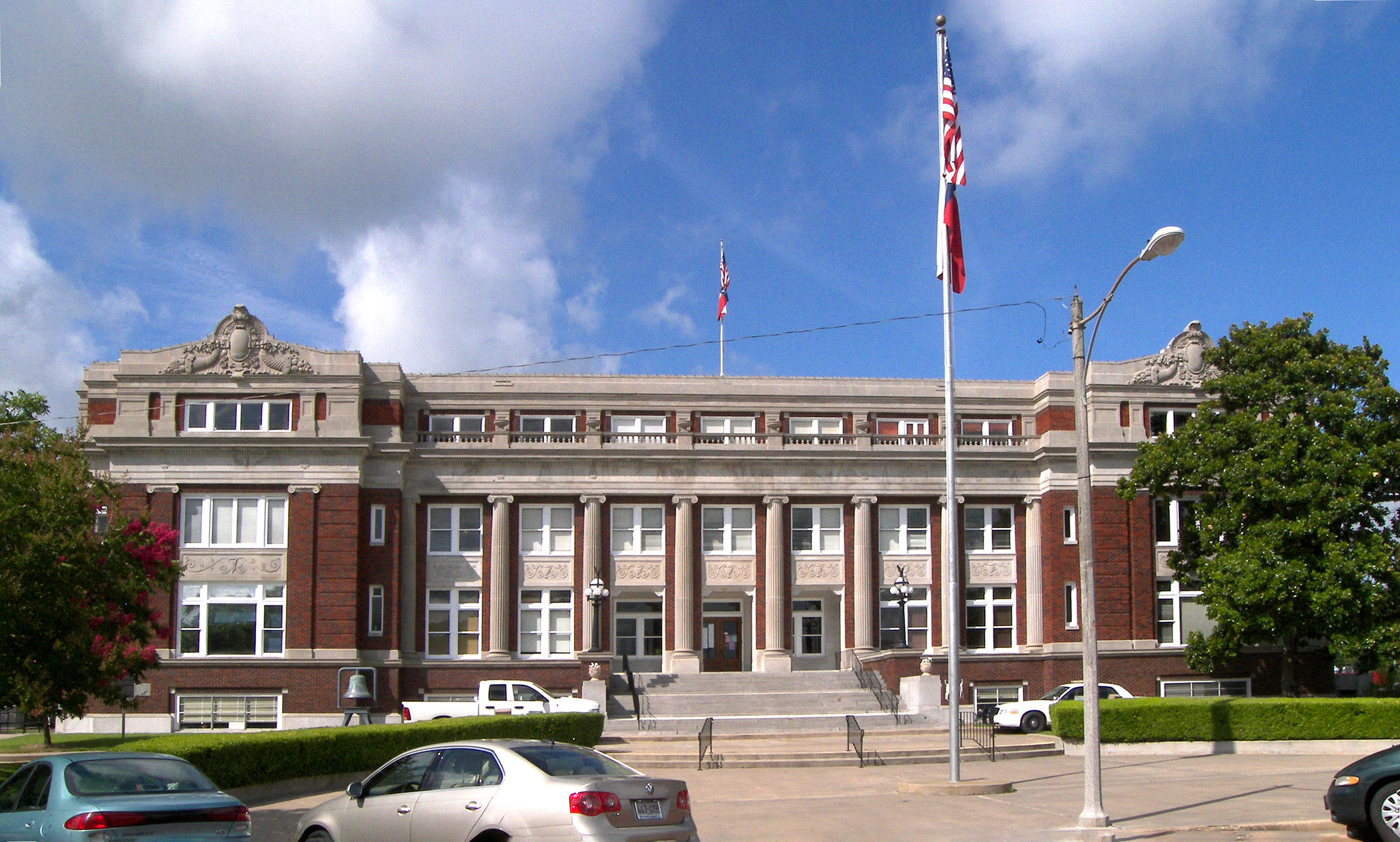
- The Limestone County Courthouse in Groesbeck

- Location within the U.S. state of Texas
- Coordinates: 31°32′N 96°35′W
- Country: United States
- State: Texas
- Founded: 1846
- Seat: Groesbeck
- Largest city: Mexia

Area
  - Total: 933 sq mi (2,420 km^{2})
  - Land: 905 sq mi (2,340 km^{2})
  - Water: 28 sq mi (73 km^{2}) 3.0%

Population (2020)
  - Total: 22,146
  - Estimate (2025): 22,849 ▲
  - Density: 24.5/sq mi (9.45/km^{2})
- Time zone: UTC−6 (Central)
  - Summer (DST): UTC−5 (CDT)
- Congressional district: 17th
- Website: www.co.limestone.tx.us

Limestone County is a county in the U.S. state of Texas. As of the 2020 census, its population was 22,146. Its county seat is Groesbeck. The county was created in 1846.

== History ==
=== Native Americans ===
Natives friendly to the settlers resided in East Texas before the Kiowa, Apache and Comanche intruded upon their territory. These tribes hunted, farmed the land, and were adept traders. The Tawakoni branch of Wichita Indians originated north of Texas, but migrated south into east Texas. From 1843 onward, the Tawakoni were part of treaties made by both the Republic of Texas and the United States. Tawakoni were also sometimes known as Tehuacana. The Limestone County town of Tehuacana was settled on the former site of a Tehuacana village. The Waco people were also a branch of the Wichita Indians.

=== Settlers ===
Limestone County was part of the Haden Harrison Edwards (800 families) and Robertson's Colony (800 families) empresario grants made by the Coahuila y Texas legislature in 1825. By contracting how many families each grantee could settle, the government sought to have some control over colonization.

Baptist spiritual leader Daniel Parker and eight other men organized the Pilgrim Predestinarian Regular Baptist Church in Lamotte, Illinois. The fellowship in its entirety migrated in 1833 to the new frontier of Texas. Among this group of settlers were Silas M. Parker, Moses Herrin, Elisha Anglin, Luther T. M. Plummer, David Faulkenberry, Joshua Hadley, and Samuel Frost. Fort Parker, near the Navasota River in what is now central Limestone County, was the earliest actual settlement in the vicinity. Following on the heels of the original settlers, other communities were established.

==== Fort Parker massacre ====
Arguably the most infamous Indian depredation in Texas took place in Limestone County on May 19, 1836, when an odd alliance of Comanche, Kiowa, Caddo, and Wichita approached Fort Parker surreptitiously under a flag of peace. The Indians subsequently attacked the fort, killing or kidnapping all but about 18 settlers who escaped to Fort Houston. Captured in the Fort Parker massacre were Elizabeth Kellogg, Rachel Plummer and her son James Pratt Plummer, John Richard Parker and his sister Cynthia Ann Parker, who later became mother of Comanche Chief Quanah Parker.

=== County established ===
On April 11, 1846, Limestone County was formed from Robertson County. On August 18, 1846, the county was organized. Springfield became the county seat. The county seat was moved to Groesbeck in 1873 after boundary changes, and the Springfield courthouse had burned down.

Homesteaders became self-sustaining farmers and ranchers, who also hunted wild game. Support businesses were connected to the repair and maintenance of farm equipment and livestock. The population of 1860 was 4,537. Of these, 3,464 were White, 1,072 were slaves, and one was a free Black female.

=== Civil War and Reconstruction ===
Limestone County voted 525–9 in favor of secession from the Union, and sent its men to fight for the Confederate States of America. Lochlin Johnson Farrar raised the first Confederate company from the county. Reconstruction in the county was so contentious, with racial violence and threats against the government, that on October 9, 1871, Texas Governor Edmund J. Davis declared the county under martial law.

=== Postwar development ===
The Houston and Texas Central Railway laid tracks in 1869, terminating near Kosse which was named after the railway's chief engineer Theodore Kosse. The Trinity and Brazos Valley Railway, laid track in 1903 from Cleburne to Mexia. Several towns were established on these routes.

The Thornton Institute was founded in 1877 by Edward Coke Chambers and was chartered in 1881 as the Thornton Male and Female Institute. The school provided a type of dormitory for the students and sent many graduates out to teach in rural Texas. Henry P. Davis acquired the school in 1889, and in 1891, the school was given to the Thornton Independent School District.

Oil and gas were discovered in Mexia between 1913 and 1920, creating jobs and a population boom - from just 3,482 people to 35,000 in 1922. Martial law had to be briefly declared in Mexia. The population began to decline during the Great Depression. Camp Mexia, a German prisoner of war camp was built during World War II.

The Work Projects Administration (WPA) and the Civilian Conservation Corps (CCC) helped ease the county economic issues during the Great Depression. The CCC built Fort Parker State Recreation Area. The WPA erected a number of buildings in the county.

== Geography ==
According to the U.S. Census Bureau, the county has a total area of 933 square miles (2,420 km^{2}), of which 905 square miles (2,340 km^{2}) are land and 28 square miles (73 km^{2}) (3.0%) are covered by water.

=== Major highways ===
- U.S. Highway 84
- State Highway 7
- State Highway 14
- State Highway 164
- State Highway 171
- Loop 442

=== Adjacent counties ===
- Navarro County (north)
- Freestone County (northeast)
- Leon County (southeast)
- Robertson County (south)
- Falls County (southwest)
- McLennan County (west)
- Hill County (northwest)

== Demographics ==
Historical population
Census	Pop.	Note	%±
1850	2,608		—
1860	4,537		74.0%
1870	8,591		89.4%
1880	16,246		89.1%
1890	21,678		33.4%
1900	32,573		50.3%
1910	34,621		6.3%
1920	33,283		−3.9%
1930	39,497		18.7%
1940	33,781		−14.5%
1950	25,251		−25.3%
1960	20,413		−19.2%
1970	18,100		−11.3%
1980	20,224		11.7%
1990	20,946		3.6%
2000	22,051		5.3%
2010	23,384		6.0%
2020	22,146		−5.3%
2025 (est.)	22,849	▲	3.2%
U.S. Decennial Census; 1850–2010 2010 2020

=== 2020 census ===
As of the 2020 census, the county had a population of 22,146, and the median age was 41.7 years; 22.8% of residents were under 18 and 20.5% were 65 or older.The female/male ratio was 1:1.018 males, and the 18 and over female/male ratio was with 1:0.998.

Of the 8,237 households in the county, 31.1% had children under 18 living in them, 48.2% were married-couple households, 18.0% were households with a male householder and no spouse or partner present, and 28.5% were households with a female householder and no spouse or partner present. About 26.1% of all households were made up of individuals, and 12.8% had someone living alone who was 65 years of age or older.

The county had 10,368 housing units, of which 20.6% were vacant; among occupied units, 74.2% were owner-occupied and 25.8% were renter-occupied, with a homeowner vacancy rate of 2.0% and a rental vacancy rate of 11.1%.

The racial makeup of the county was 63.3% White, 16.8% Black or African American, 0.7% American Indian and Alaska Native, 0.7% Asian, 0.1% Native Hawaiian and Pacific Islander, 10.6% from some other race, and 7.8% from two or more races. Hispanic or Latino residents of any race comprised 22.6% of the population.

About 30.1% of residents lived in urban areas, while 69.9% lived in rural areas.

=== Racial and ethnic composition ===
Limestone County, Texas – Racial and ethnic composition Note: the US Census treats Hispanic/Latino as an ethnic category. This table excludes Latinos from the racial categories and assigns them to a separate category. Hispanics/Latinos may be of any race.
Race / Ethnicity (NH = Non-Hispanic)	Pop 2000	Pop 2010	Pop 2020	% 2000	% 2010	% 2020
White alone (NH)	14,711	14,433	12,530	66.71%	61.72%	56.58%
Black or African American alone (NH)	4,186	4,041	3,636	18.98%	17.28%	16.42%
Native American or Alaska Native alone (NH)	71	68	72	0.32%	0.29%	0.33%
Asian alone (NH)	19	84	160	0.09%	0.36%	0.72%
Pacific Islander alone (NH)	2	1	18	0.01%	0.00%	0.08%
Other race alone (NH)	8	22	60	0.04%	0.00%	0.27%
Multiracial (NH)	195	270	657	0.88%	1.15%	2.97%
Hispanic or Latino (any race)	2,859	4,465	5,013	12.97%	19.09%	22.64%
Total	22,051	23,384	22,146	100.00%	100.00%	100.00%

=== 2000 census ===
As of the 2000 census, 22,051 people, 7,906 households, and 5,652 families resided in the county. The population density was 24 people per square mile (9.3 people/km^{2}). The 9,725 housing units averaged 11 units per square mile (4.2/km^{2}). The racial makeup of the county was 70.75% White 19.07% African American, 0.45% Native American, 0.12% Asian, 8.11% from other races, and 1.49% from two or more races. About 12.97% of the population was Latino of any race.

Of the 7,906 households, 32.0% had children under 18 living with them, 54.0% were married couples living together, 13.5% had a female householder with no husband present, and 28.5% were not families. About 25.6% of all households were made up of individuals, and 13.8% had someone living alone who was 65 or older. The average household size was 2.55 and the average family size was 3.04.

In the county, the population was distributed as 25.4% under 18, 9.1% from 18 to 24, 26.4% from 25 to 44, 22.7% from 45 to 64, and 16.4% who were 65 or older. The median age was 37 years. For every 100 females, there were 103.2 males. For every 100 females age 18 and over, there were 100.8 males.

The median income in the county for a household was $29,366 and for a family was $36,924. Males had a median income of $28,069 versus $18,893 for females. The per capita income for the county was $14,352. About 14.4% of families and 17.8% of the population were below the poverty line, including 22.9% of those under 18 and 15.0% of those 65 or over.

== Communities ==
=== Cities ===
- Groesbeck (county seat)
- Mart (mostly in McLennan County)
- Mexia

=== Towns ===
- Coolidge
- Kosse
- Tehuacana
- Thornton

=== Unincorporated communities ===
- Ben Hur
- Big Hill
- Box Church
- Buffalo Mop
- Forest Glade
- Kirk
- Old Union
- Oletha
- Prairie Hill
- Victoria

=== Ghost town ===
- Springfield

== Notable people ==
- Sheppard Mullins (19th-century), African American state legislator
- Alfonso Steele (1817–1911) was born in 1817 in Hardin County, Kentucky, and is buried in Mexia.
- Anna Nicole Smith (1967–2007) lived briefly in Mexia.
- Don the Beachcomber (1907–1989) was born Ernest Raymond Beaumont Gantt in Limestone County.
- Bob Wills (1905-1975) was born on a farm in Kosse, in the southern portion of Limestone County.
- Rachel Plummer (1819-1839) captured by Comanches at the age of seventeen, wrote of her twenty-one month ordeal before her death.

== Government and politics ==
=== Government ===
United States presidential election results for Limestone County, Texas
Year	Republican		Democratic		Third party(ies)	
Year	No.	%	No.	%	No.	%
1912	153	7.19%	1,667	78.37%	307	14.43%
1916	225	8.91%	2,188	86.62%	113	4.47%
1920	408	12.04%	2,165	63.86%	817	24.10%
1924	523	9.62%	4,868	89.58%	43	0.79%
1928	1,642	38.64%	2,608	61.36%	0	0.00%
1932	215	4.64%	4,416	95.28%	4	0.09%
1936	196	4.83%	3,857	95.05%	5	0.12%
1940	559	10.46%	4,784	89.50%	2	0.04%
1944	239	4.73%	4,299	84.99%	520	10.28%
1948	688	15.18%	3,289	72.57%	555	12.25%
1952	2,485	37.50%	4,132	62.35%	10	0.15%
1956	2,097	40.55%	3,067	59.31%	7	0.14%
1960	2,023	36.71%	3,472	63.00%	16	0.29%
1964	1,478	28.08%	3,777	71.77%	8	0.15%
1968	1,485	26.13%	2,796	49.20%	1,402	24.67%
1972	2,949	66.67%	1,452	32.83%	22	0.50%
1976	2,045	34.66%	3,825	64.83%	30	0.51%
1980	2,835	44.86%	3,403	53.85%	81	1.28%
1984	4,063	55.62%	3,228	44.19%	14	0.19%
1988	3,257	48.16%	3,476	51.40%	30	0.44%
1992	2,358	33.40%	3,188	45.16%	1,514	21.44%
1996	2,691	40.49%	3,236	48.69%	719	10.82%
2000	4,212	59.53%	2,768	39.12%	95	1.34%
2004	5,028	64.31%	2,752	35.20%	38	0.49%
2008	5,079	66.20%	2,516	32.79%	77	1.00%
2012	5,288	69.92%	2,208	29.19%	67	0.89%
2016	5,796	74.89%	1,778	22.97%	165	2.13%
2020	6,789	74.52%	2,213	24.29%	108	1.19%
2024	7,081	78.03%	1,921	21.17%	73	0.80%

United States Senate election results for Limestone County, Texas1
Year	Republican		Democratic		Third party(ies)	
Year	No.	%	No.	%	No.	%
2024	6,821	75.70%	2,045	22.69%	145	1.61%

United States Senate election results for Limestone County, Texas2
Year	Republican		Democratic		Third party(ies)	
Year	No.	%	No.	%	No.	%
2020	6,656	74.23%	2,112	23.55%	199	2.22%

Texas Gubernatorial election results for Limestone County
Year	Republican		Democratic		Third party(ies)	
Year	No.	%	No.	%	No.	%
2022	5,390	78.67%	1,366	19.94%	95	1.39%

Limestone County, like all counties in Texas, is governed by a commissioners' court. This court consists of the county judge (the chairperson of the court), who is elected county-wide, and four commissioners who are elected by the voters in each of four precincts.

The Commissioners' Court is the policy-making body for the county; in addition, the county judge is the senior executive and administrative position in the county. The Commissioners' Court sets the county tax rate, adopts the budget, appoints boards and commissions, approves grants and personnel actions, and oversees the administration of county government. Each commissioner supervises a Road and Bridge District. The Commissioners' Court approves the budget and sets the tax rate for the hospital district, which is charged with the responsibility for providing acute medical care for citizens who otherwise would not receive adequate medical services.

Limestone County is represented in the United States Congress as part of Texas's 17th congressional district, represented by Republican Pete Sessions of Waco. Its two senators are Ted Cruz and John Cornyn, both Republicans. At the state level, Limestone County is represented in the Texas State Legislature as part of Texas's 13th House of Representatives district, represented by Republican Angelia Orr of Itasca, and Texas Senate, District 5, represented by Republican Charles Schwertner of Georgetown.

==== County Commissioners ====
Office	Name	Party
County Judge	Richard Duncan	Republican
Commissioner, Precinct 1	Jody Goodman	Republican
Commissioner, Precinct 2	Micah Anderson	Republican
Commissioner, Precinct 3	Stephen Friday	Republican
Commissioner, Precinct 4	Bobby Forrest	Republican

==== Justices of the Peace ====
Office	Name	Party
Justice of the Peace, Precinct 1	Marcus Ray Hanna	Republican
Justice of the Peace, Precinct 2	Mike Bell	Republican
Justice of the Peace, Precinct 3	Jeff Melasky	Republican
Justice of the Peace, Precinct 4	Ray Jones	Republican

==== Constables ====
Office	Name	Party
Constable, Precinct 1	Scott T. Smith	Republican
Constable, Precinct 2	Michael Carter	Republican
Constable, Precinct 3	Thomas Shoemaker	Republican
Constable, Precinct 4	Mark Roark	Republican

==== County Officials ====
Office	Name	Party
District/County Attorney	Jeff Janes	Republican
District Clerk	Carol Sue Jenkins	Republican
County Clerk	Kerrie Cobb	Republican
Sheriff	Murray Agnew	Republican
Tax Assessor-Collector	Stacy Hall	Republican
Treasurer	Carol Pickett	Republican

=== Courts ===
==== County Criminal Court ====
Office	Name	Party
Limestone County Court	Richard Duncan	Republican

==== District Courts ====
Office	Name	Party
Texas's 77th Judicial District	Roy DeFriend	Republican
Texas's 87th Judicial District	Amy Thomas Ward	Republican

=== Politics ===
Like the majority of Southern counties, Limestone was traditionally dominated by the Democratic Party, consistently voting for it by wide majorities upon statehood. Limestone's Democratic dominance was shown by its Civil War history, in which it voted for secession by 98% and raised multiple companies to fight for the Confederacy. This Democratic dominance continued well into the 20th century, where Limestone County only voted for five Republicans at any level, all during national and statewide landslides. Since the turn of the 21st century, Limestone County has followed the rest of rural Texas in becoming strongly Republican, with Republicans gaining in vote percentage in every single election so far (aside from a less than 1% decrease in 2020). In 2024, Limestone County gave Republicans their highest share of the vote in county history.

Limestone County's Republican bent is fairly consistent across the county, with almost every precinct voting heavily for Republicans. The only major Democratic stronghold in the county is in Mexia, whose large percentage of African-Americans and Hispanic Americans has led Western Mexia to be the only Democratic-voting precinct in the county. As of 2024, Republicans control every local office in the county.

== Education ==
School districts include:

- Axtell Independent School District
- Coolidge Independent School District
- Groesbeck Independent School District
- Hubbard Independent School District
- Mart Independent School District
- Mexia Independent School District
- Mount Calm Independent School District
- Wortham Independent School District

The entire county is in the service area of Navarro College, according to the Texas Education Code.

== See also ==
- National Register of Historic Places listings in Limestone County, Texas
- Recorded Texas Historic Landmarks in Limestone County
