= Mejia =

Mejia, Mejía, Mejia, Mejía or Mejía may refer to:

- Mejía (surname), a surname (and list of people with the name)
- Mejía (canton), a canton in province of Pichincha, Ecuador
- Mejia (community development block), an administrative division in Bankura Sadar subdivision, Bankura district, West Bengal, India
- Mejia, Bankura, a village in Bankura district, West Bengal, India
- Mejía District, a district in the province of Islay, Arequipa, Peru; also, its capital
- Mexia, Alabama, unincorporated community in Monroe County, southern Alabama, U.S.
- Mexia, Texas, town in limestone County, central Texas, U.S.
  - Mexia High School
  - Mexia Independent School District
  - Mexia News, a newspaper published in Mexia, Texas
- Mexia Supermarket, an abandoned grocery store in Fort Worth, Texas
- Mejía Municipality, a municipality on the Gulf of Cariaco in state of Sucre, Venezuela

== See also ==
- Ministro Ramos Mexía, a village and municipality, Río Negro Province, Argentina
- Ramos Mejía, a locale in La Matanza Partido, Greater Buenos Aires, Argentina
  - Hospital Ramos Mejía, a hospital in Buenos Aires, Argentina
- Instituto Nacional Mejía, a secondary educational institution in Quito, Ecuador
- Tlacotepec de Mejía, a municipality in the state of Veracruz, Mexico
- Nochistlán de Mejía Municipality, a municipality in the state of Zacatecas, Mexico
