= Senator Yoakum =

Senator Yoakum may refer to:

- Charles Henderson Yoakum (1849–1909), Texas State Senate
- Henderson King Yoakum (1810–1856), Texas State Senate
