= SS Susana =

Cargo ship that served in both world wars

History
- Name: 1914: Erny; 1920: Warszawa; 1923: Stanley Dollar; 1936: Susana
- Namesake: 1920: Warsaw; 1923: Stanley Dollar
- Owner: 1914: Unione Austriaca; 1917: USSB; 1920: Polish American Nav Corp; 1923: Robert Dollar Co; 1925: Dollar SS Line; 1936: Madrigal & Co
- Operator: 1919: Emergency Fleet Corporation; 1925: Robert Dollar Co, Inc
- Port of registry: 1914: (Austria-Hungary) Trieste; 1917: (United States) New York; 1923: (United States) San Francisco; 1936: (United States) Manila
- Builder: Cantiere Navale Triestino, Monfalcone
- Launched: 31 January 1914
- Completed: April 1914
- Identification: 1914: code letters HGMB; by 1918: US official number 215293; by 1918: code letters LHKV; by 1934: call sign WCDM
- Fate: sunk by torpedo, 14 October 1942

General characteristics
- Tonnage: 1914: 6,515 GRT, 4,171 NRT; 1924: 5,929 GRT, 3,742 NRT
- Length: 402.0 ft (122.5 m)
- Beam: 51.8 ft (15.8 m)
- Draft: 27 ft 2 in (8.28 m)
- Depth: 30.9 ft (9.4 m)
- Decks: 1
- Installed power: 1 × triple-expansion engine, 2,700 ihp, 520 NHP
- Propulsion: 1 × screw
- Speed: 14 knots (26 km/h)
- Crew: 1923: 30 officers and men; 1942: 42 officers & men, + 16 Armed Guards
- Armament: 1942: 1 × 4-inch (100 mm) gun; 4 × 50 caliber guns; 2 × 30 caliber guns

SS Susana was a cargo steamship. She was built in 1914 as Erny for Unione Austriaca. Later that year, when the First World War began, she was interned in the US. In 1917, the US government seized her, but did not assume ownership of her. Two shipbrokers bought her, and sold her on to the US government. She became the property of the United States Shipping Board (USSB), and by 1919 the Emergency Fleet Corporation was managing her. By 1920, the Polish American Navigation Corporation had bought her, and renamed her Warszawa. In 1923, the Robert Dollar Company bought her, and renamed her Stanley Dollar. In 1936, a Filipino shipping company bought her, and renamed her Susana. She took part in the Battle of the Atlantic, and in 1942 a German U-boat sank her, killing 38 members of her company.

She was the second Unione Austriaca ship to be called Erny. The first was a cargo steamship that was built in Scotland in 1904, and sold and renamed in 1912. She was the second Robert Dollar ship to be called Stanley Dollar. The first was a cargo steamship that was built in 1912 as Adeline Smith, and renamed Stanley Dollar in 1919 or 1920.

== Erny ==
Cantiere Navale Triestino in Monfalcone, near Trieste in what was then Austria-Hungary, built the ship. She was launched on 31 January 1914 as Erny, and completed that April. She was the last ship to be completed for Unione Austriaca before the First World War. Her registered length was 402.0 ft (122.5 m), her beam was 51.8 ft (15.8 m), her depth was 30.9 ft (9.4 m), and her draft was 27 ft 2 in (8.28 m). As built, her tonnages were 6,515 GRT and 4,171 NRT. She had a single screw, driven by a three-cylinder triple-expansion engine built by John G. Kincaid & Company of Greenock in Scotland. It was rated at 520 NHP, or 2,700 ihp, and gave her a speed of 14 knots (26 km/h). Unione Austriaco registered her at Trieste. Her code letters were HSFW.

== Internment and seizure ==
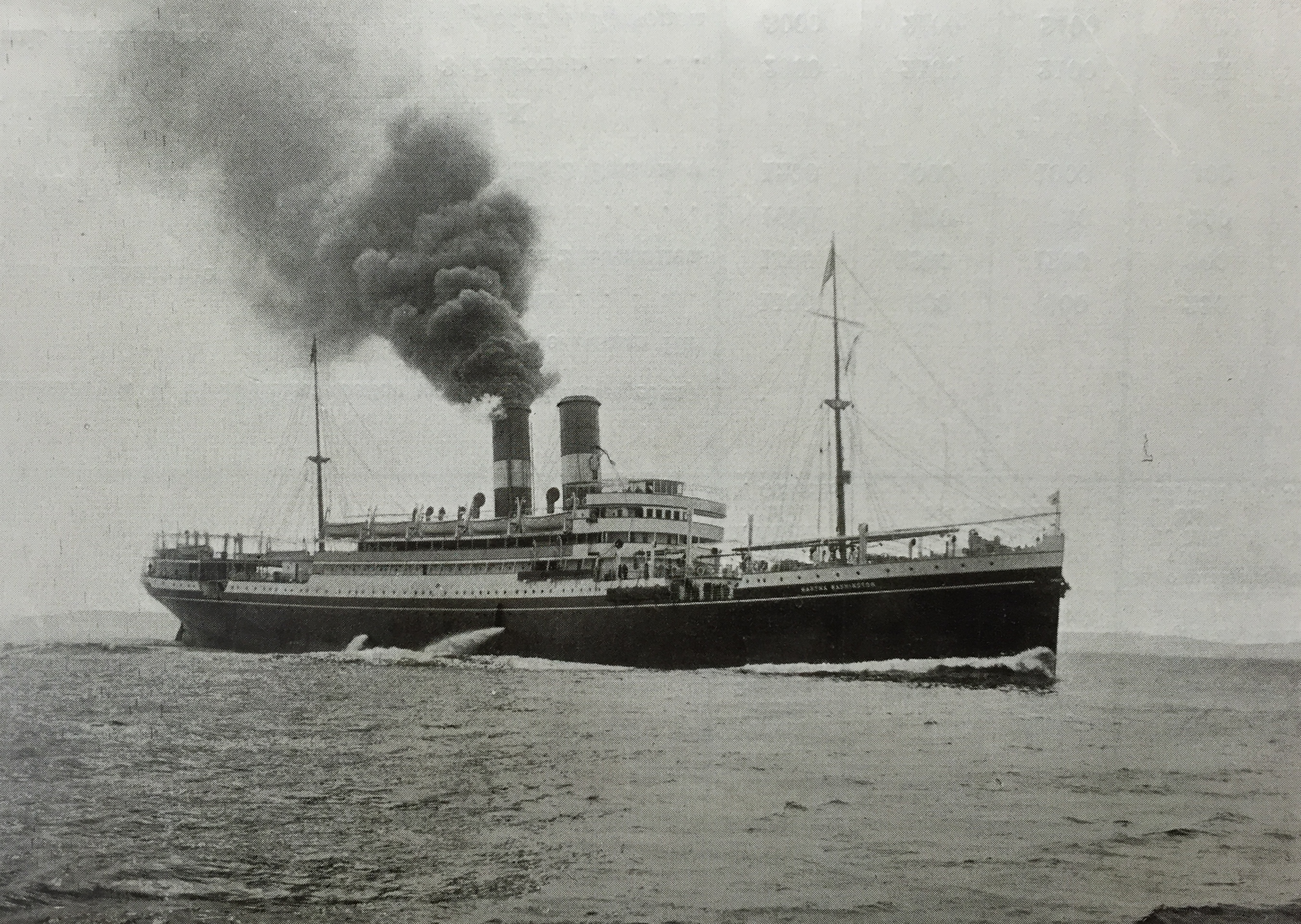
The liner Martha Washington in 1913

When the First World War began, on 3 August 1914, Germany and Austria-Hungary ordered their merchant ships to return home if possible, or otherwise take shelter in a neutral port. Unione Austriaca's fleet included 30 ocean-going steamships, eight of which took refuge in US ports. Erny sheltered in Boston. The liner Martha Washington sheltered in New York, with the cargo ships Dora and Ida. Three cargo ships; Anna, Teresa, and Clara; remained in New Orleans. The cargo ship Lucia sheltered in Pensacola. Along with Erny, five German ships also sheltered in Boston: Hamburg America Line's Amerika and Cincinnati, Norddeutscher Lloyd's Köln and Wittekind, and DDG Hansa's Ockenfels. In November 1914, NDL's Kronprinzessin Cecilie joined them.

On 6 April 1917, the US declared war against Germany, and seized all German ships in its ports. The US did not declare war against Austria-Hungary, so the 14 Austro-Hungarian ships in US ports were not seized. However, two days later, Austria-Hungary terminated diplomatic relations with the US, so the US responded by seizing all of those Austro-Hungarian ships. The crews were removed, and taken into the custody of the United States Department of Labor. United States Customs Service guards were placed on all of the seized ships.

== US purchase ==
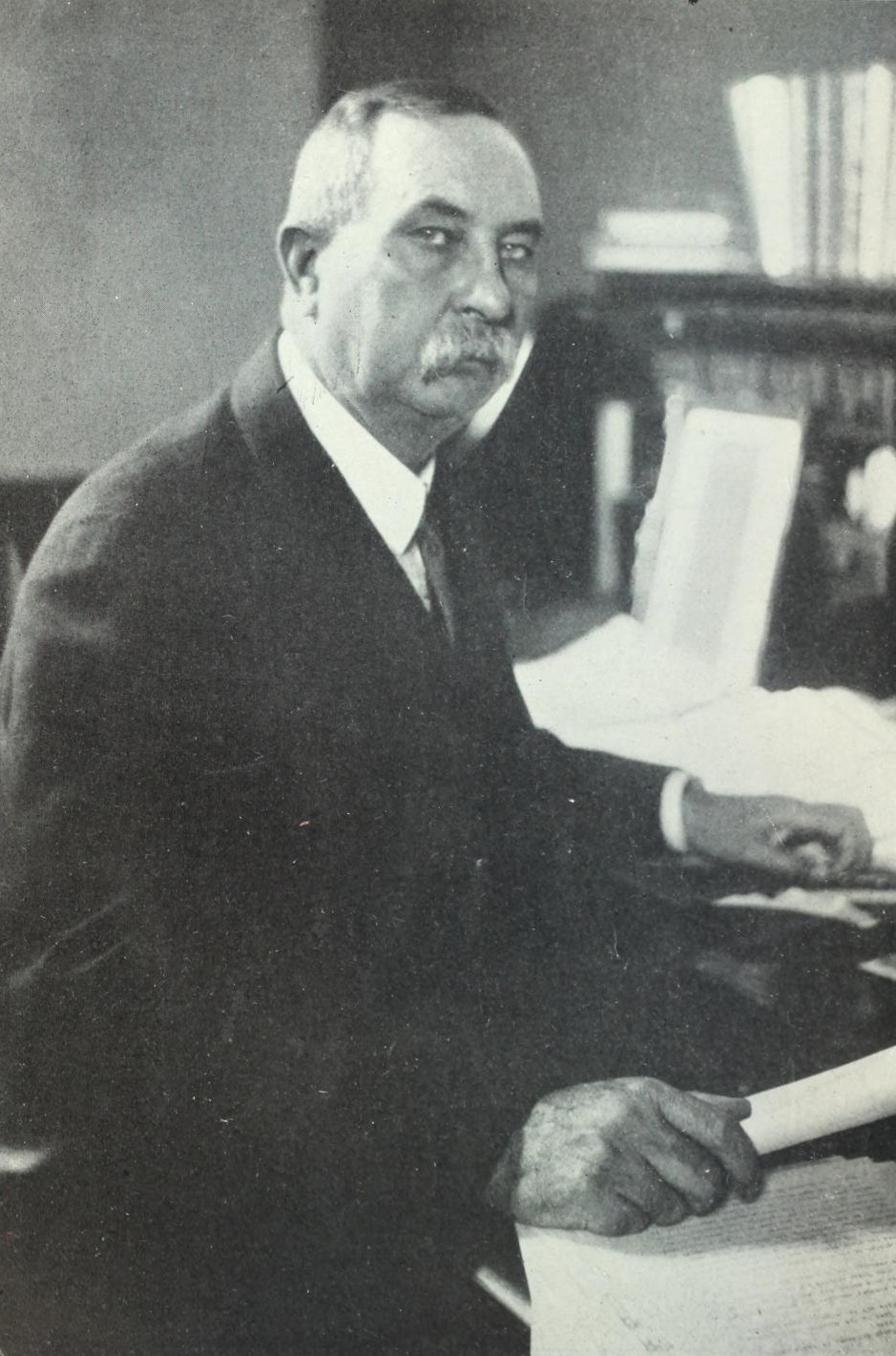
Benjamin Franklin Yoakum

The eight Unione Austriaca ships remained the property of their Austro-Hungarian owners. Soon after they were seized, two New York shipbrokers, George Carden and Anderson Herd, bought all seven of Unione Austriaca's cargo ships, including Erny, for $6,370,771, which was said to be about half of their true value. The price included $159,209 commission, which was shared between a number of intermediaries, including a Hungarian Count Rudolf Festetics who was a reserve officer in the Austro-Hungarian Navy, and a French Baron Robert Oppenheim. Two days after the sale, a consortium of industrialists and financiers offered Carden and Herd $10,060,000 for the seven ships. The consortium comprised Benjamin Franklin Yoakum, Percy Rivington Pyne II, JH Carpenter, August Heckscher, and Robert Walton Goelet. Carden and Herd declined the offer, believing that the ships were worth more.

William Denman, Chairman of the USSB, then summoned Carden and Herd's attorney to Washington, where he told him the US government wanted the ships. Carden and Herd were told that President Wilson wanted them to sell the ships to the government at cost price, without taking a profit. After consulting with Yoakum, Carden and Herd agreed to sell them to the government. The government paid Carden and Herd $6,778,006, which was $407,235 more than the brokers paid for the ships.

The United States Shipping Board took ownership of Erny. By June 1918, she was registered in New York, her US official number was 215293, and her code letters were LHKV. By July 1919, she was equipped with wireless telegraphy, and the Emergency Fleet Corporation was managing her.

== Warszawa ==
On 30 April 1919, at the Hotel McAlpin in Manhattan, the Polish American Navigation Co was inaugurated, with a head office at 115 Broadway. It aimed to provide passenger and freight services between the US and Poland. It bought a fleet of second-hand ships, and renamed them with Polish names. These included three former Unione Austriaca ships from the USSB: Erny, which it renamed Warszawa; Clara, which it renamed Kraków; and Ida, which it renamed Pulawski. In 1920, Pulawski was sold back to Cosulich Line, which was the former Unione Austriaca, and her name was changed back to Ida. In October 1920, Kraków burnt out in Havana and sank. Warszawa remained in the Polish American fleet until 1922 or 1923.

In August 1920, Warszawa was delayed in Antwerp. She was loading munitions that were being sent from the American Expeditionary Forces that were taking part in the Occupation of the Rhineland, to arm the forces of the Second Polish Republic in the Polish–Soviet War. On 21 August, Belgian dockworkers stopped work, and 30 railroad cars full of munitions were held up in railway sidings. She eventually left Antwerp for Gdańsk on 27 August.

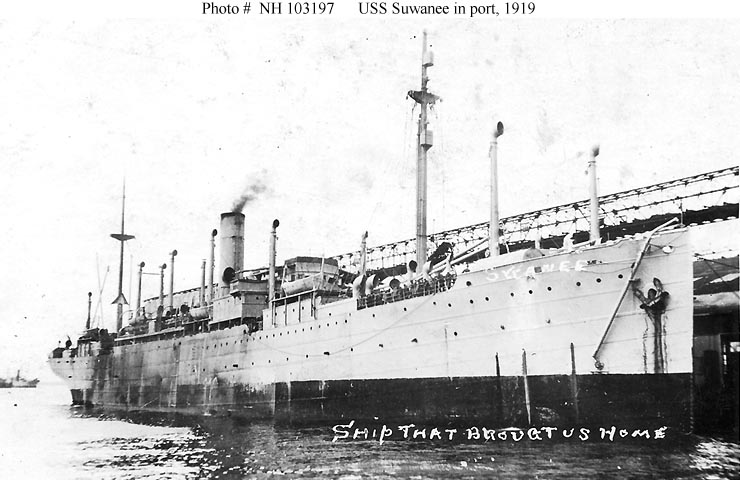
Poznań, the former USS Suwanee

Polish American Navigation bought its fleet from the USSB by paying in instalments. By February 1922 it had suspended operations, after the USSB had seized at least five ships, including Warszawa, for which the company had paid $2.5 million out of a total $7 million. A merger with the Polish Mercantile Marine Corporation was proposed. On 6 April, a US Marshal put one of the company's ships, Poznań, up for auction in lieu of debts, with a reserve price of $200,000. By August 1922, Polish American Navigation was to merge with the Polish Navigation Corporation, to create a company called United Polish Lines. It was to be headed by Admiral Walter McLean and Commander Alfred von Niezychowski.

== Stanley Dollar ==
By June 1923, the Robert Dollar Company had bought Warszawa, renamed her Stanley Dollar after Stanley Dollar, and registered her in San Francisco. Her tonnages were revised to 5,929 GRT and 3,742 NRT. By 1934, her call sign was WCDM, and this had superseded her code letters.

On Saturday 7 October 1923, Stanley Dollar left San Francisco for Japan. Her Master was a Captain RB Wilke. On 10 October, he signalled by wireless telegraph that fire had broken out in her number three hold, and she would return to port. Wilke reported that the fire was under control, and he had declined offers of help from three nearby vessels. Stanley Dollar's crew used steam to quench the fire. On 13 October, she arrived back in San Francisco, with her cargo still smoldering, and she docked near the port's fireboats.

== Susana ==
In 1936, Madrigal & Co bought Stanley Dollar, renamed her Susana, and registered her in Manila in the Philippines.

On 31 August 1942, Susana left Cristóbal, Panama with Convoy ZG 1. This was a convoy of seven US merchant ships, two UK merchant ship, and one Panamanian; and a United States Navy escort of two destroyers, two submarine chasers, and one armed yacht. On 5 September, ZG 1 reached Guantánamo Bay in Cuba, and Susana left on the same day with Convoy GN 1. This comprised 34 merchant ships, of seven nationalities, with no naval escort. GN 1 reached New York on 12 September.

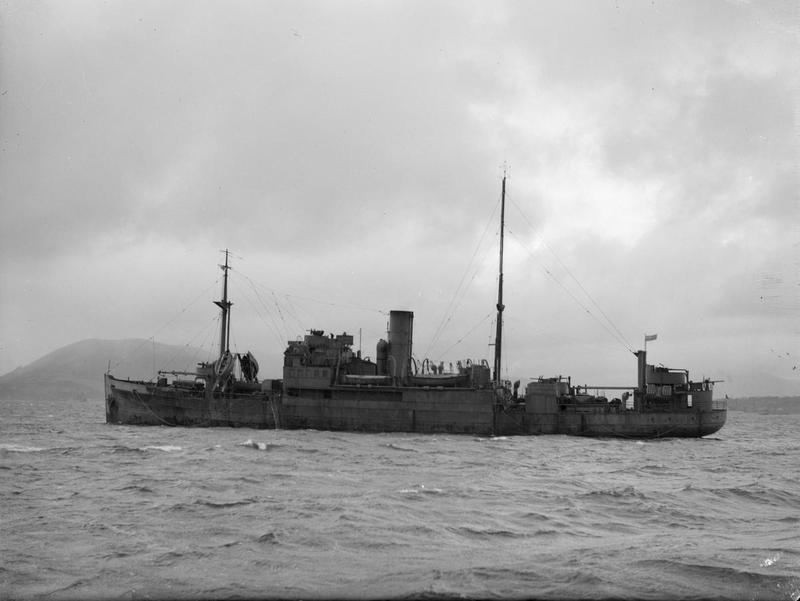
The UK convoy rescue ship Gothland

On 3 October 1942, Susana left New York with Convoy SC 104, which was destined for Liverpool in England. Susana's cargo included high-value items, and mail. SC 104 included 57 merchant ships, of eight different nationalities. At different times, the convoy was escorted by 17 naval ships, from the Royal Navy and Royal Canadian Navy. Susana was defensively armed with one 4-inch (100 mm) gun, four M2 Browning machine guns, and two M1919 Browning machine guns. Her Master was a Captain Jose Ayesa. Her company comprised 42 officers & men, plus 16 United States Navy Armed Guards to man her guns. Most of civilian crew were Filipinos, plus at least three Norwegians.

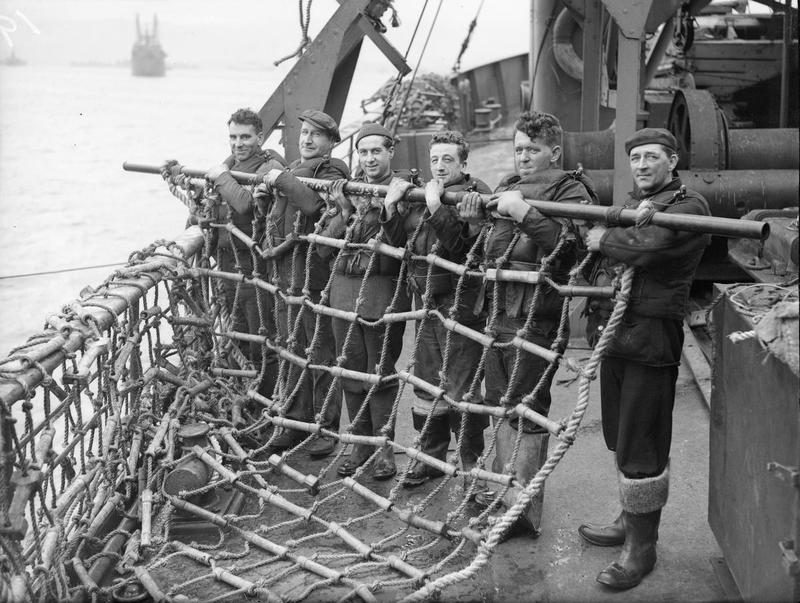
Members of crew of the UK convoy rescue ship Gothland, in February 1943, displaying a scramble net with which to rescue survivors without lowering a lifeboat

On 11 October, the U-boat U-258 found SC 104, and on the night of 12–13 October, three members of the wolf pack Wotan attacked the convoy, sinking three merchant ships. The next day, five more U-boats arrived, and on the night of 13–14 October, all eight attacked the convoy. They sank another four merchant ships, including Susana. At 00:04, 00:12, and 00:13 hrs, German time, U-221 fired torpedoes at the convoy. Only one hit a target, and this was Susana. It exploded in the starboard side of her number 5 hold, causing her to settle rapidly by the stern, and sank in six minutes at position 53°41′N 41°23′W, northeast of St. John's, Newfoundland. One of her lifeboats was launched, and this was by six of her Armed Guards. Other members of Susana's crew jumped overboard into the rough sea.

The UK convoy rescue ship Gothland arrived, but the sea was too rough for her to lower a boat. Within an hour, she rescued the six Armed Guards from the lifeboat, and 15 crewmen from the water. Captain Ayesa, 27 of his officers and men, and ten of the Armed Guards were lost.

== Bibliography ==
- Bureau of Navigation (1918). Fiftieth Annual List of Merchant Vessels of the United States. Washington, DC: United States Department of Commerce and Labor – via HyperWar.
- Bureau of Navigation (1920). Fifty-Second Annual List of Merchant Vessels of the United States. Washington, DC: United States Department of Commerce and Labor – via HyperWar.
- Bureau of Navigation (1922). Fifty-Fourth Annual List of Merchant Vessels of the United States. Washington, DC: United States Department of Commerce and Labor – via HyperWar.
- Bureau of Navigation (1923). Fifty-Fifth Annual List of Merchant Vessels of the United States. Washington, DC: United States Department of Commerce and Labor – via HyperWar.
- Haws, Duncan (2001). Italia 1881–2001. Merchant Fleets. Vol. 40. Pembroke. ISBN 0-946378-43-6.
- Lloyd's Register of Shipping. Vol. II.–Steamers. London: Lloyd's Register of Shipping. 1914 – via Internet Archive.
- Lloyd's Register of Shipping. Vol. II.–Steamers. London: Lloyd's Register of Shipping. 1917 – via Internet Archive.
- Lloyd's Register of Shipping. Vol. II.–Steamers. London: Lloyd's Register of Shipping. 1919 – via Internet Archive.
- Lloyd's Register of Shipping. Vol. II.–Steamers. London: Lloyd's Register of Shipping. 1920 – via Internet Archive.
- Lloyd's Register of Shipping. Vol. II.–Steamers and Motor Vessels. London: Lloyd's Register of Shipping. 1923 – via Internet Archive.
- Lloyd's Register of Shipping. Vol. II.–Steamers and Motorships. London: Lloyd's Register of Shipping. 1924 – via Internet Archive.
- Lloyd's Register of Shipping. Vol. II.–Steamers and Motorships of 300 Tons Gross and Over. London: Lloyd's Register of Shipping. 1934 – via Southampton City Council.
- Lloyd's Register of Shipping. Vol. II.–Steamers and Motorships Over 300 Tons. London: Lloyd's Register of Shipping. 1936 – via Southampton City Council.
- Mayer, Horst F; Winkler, Dieter (1987). In Allen Häfen War Österreich (in German). Vienna: Edition S. ISBN 3-7046-0079-2.
