= SS Poznan =

A number of steamships have been named Poznan.

- SS Poznan (1919)
- SS Poznan (1926)
