= USS Teresa =

Cargo ship that served in the United States Navy

History
- Name: 1899: Teresa; 1923: Demokratia; 1932: Phoenix
- Namesake: 1923: Democracy; 1932: Phoenix
- Owner: 1900: Fratelli Cosulich; 1906: Unione Austriaca; 1917: USSB; 1923: George Pervolaris
- Operator: 1917: US Army; 1918: US Navy; 1919: Emergency Fleet Corp
- Port of registry: 1900: (Austria-Hungary) Trieste; 1917: (United States) New York; 1923: (Greece) Chios
- Builder: Russell & Co, Port Glasgow
- Yard number: 449
- Launched: 8 December 1899
- Completed: 1900
- Commissioned: into US Navy, 9 January 1918
- Decommissioned: from US Navy, 19 July 1919
- Identification: 1900: code letters HSFW; by 1918: US official number 215296; by 1918: code letters LHMC; 1918: Naval Registry 4478; by 1926: code letters JFHD
- Fate: scrapped, 14 November 1932

General characteristics
- Type: cargo steamship
- Tonnage: 3,769 GRT, 2,381 NRT
- Displacement: 8,615 tons
- Length: 345.8 ft (105.4 m)
- Beam: 49.8 ft (15.2 m)
- Draft: 24 ft (7.3 m)
- Depth: 17.9 ft (5.5 m)
- Decks: 1
- Installed power: 1 × triple-expansion engine, 1,206 ihp, 345 NHP
- Propulsion: 1 × screw
- Speed: 10 knots (19 km/h)
- Complement: in US Navy, 90
- Armament: 2 × 4-inch/40-caliber guns
- Notes: sister ships: Federica, Alberta, Auguste

USS Teresa (Id. No. 4478) was a cargo steamship. She was launched in Scotland in 1899 as Teresa for the shipowners Fratelli Cosulich, who at that time were Austro-Hungarian. The US interned her in 1914. In April 1917 the US government seized her, but did not assume ownership of her. Two shipbrokers bought her, and sold her on to the US government. She became the property of the United States Shipping Board (USSB), and in September 1917 the United States Army chartered her. She was commissioned into the United States Navy in 1918, and decommissioned in 1919. In 1923 a Greek shipowner bought her from the USSB, and renamed her Demokratia. In 1932 she was renamed Phoenix, and later that year she was scrapped in Italy.

== A set of sister ships ==
In 1899 and 1900, two shipyards in Port Glasgow on the Lower Clyde built four cargo steamships for the Cosulich brothers. Russell & Co built three of the four. Yard number 450 was launched as Federica on 21 September 1899, and completed that October. Yard number 449 was presumably laid down before number 450, but was launched later, on 8 December, as Teresa, and completed in January 1900. Yard number 468 was launched on 20 November 1900 as Alberta, and completed that December. Anderson Rodger & Co built the fourth ship as yard number 347. She was launched on 2 March 1900 as Auguste, and completed that June. The four ships were not built to exactly the same dimensions, but seem to have been sisters. Teresa and Alberta were the largest, and were almost identical in length and beam. Federica was about 4.7 feet (1.4 m) shorter, and 3.7 feet (1.1 m) less in beam. Auguste was the smallest of the four ships, with the same beam as Federica, but a length of only 320.2 feet (97.6 m).

Teresa's registered length was 345.8 ft (105.4 m), her beam was 49.8 ft (15.2 m), her depth was 17.9 ft (5.5 m), and her draft was 24 ft (7.3 m). Her tonnages were 3,769 GRT, 2,381 NRT, and 8,615 tons displacement. She had a single screw, driven by a three-cylinder triple-expansion engine that was built by Blackwood & Gordon of Port Glasgow. It was rated at 345 NHP or 1,206 ihp, and gave her a speed of 10 knots (19 km/h). The Cosulich brothers registered Teresa at Trieste. Her code letters were HSFW. In the second half of 1905, or the first half of 1906, the Cosulich brothers changed her ownership to Unione Austriaca di Navigazione, Società Anonima.

== Internment and seizure ==
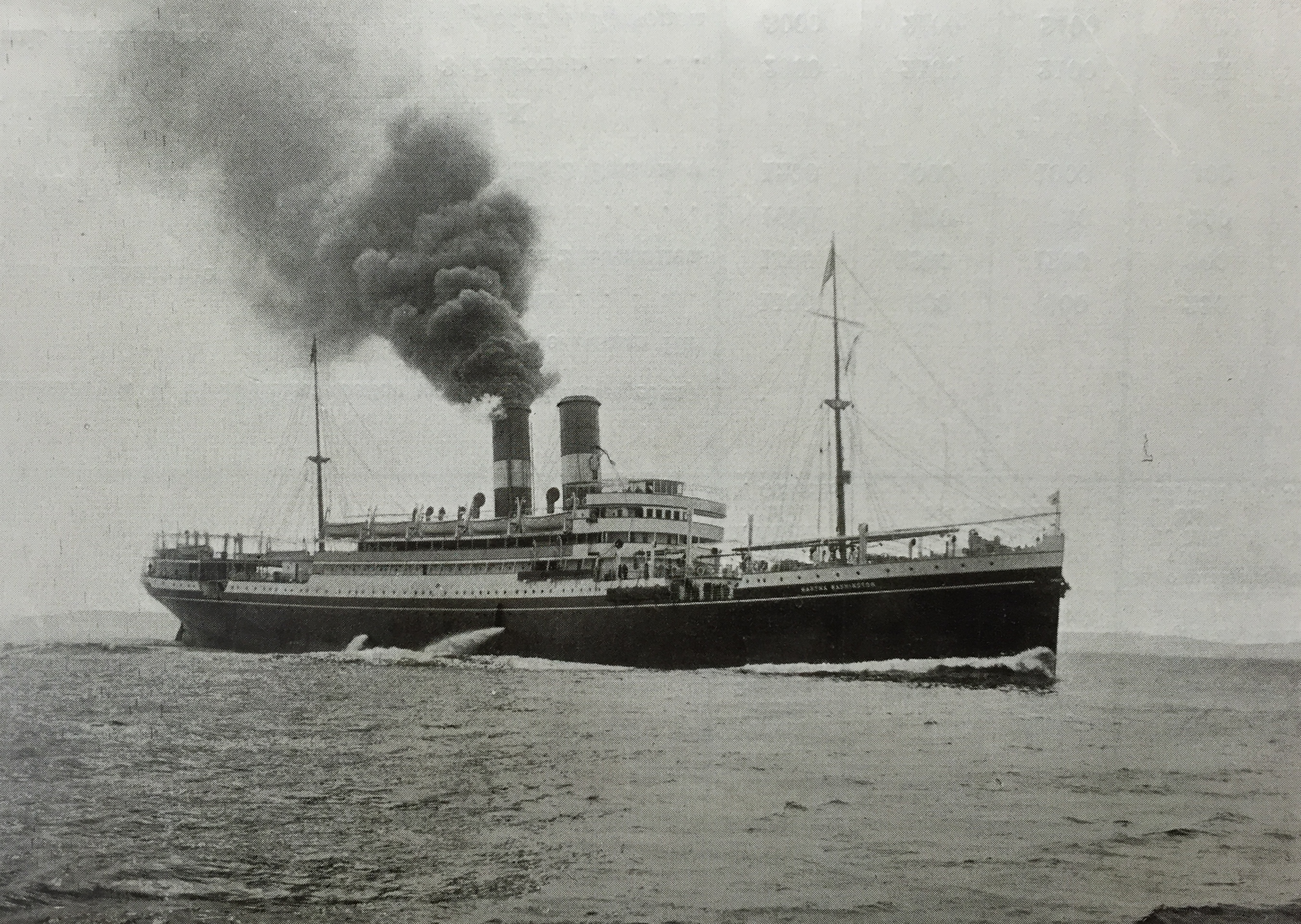
The liner Martha Washington in 1913

By 1914, Teresa was one of the ships working Unione Austriaca's cargo route between Trieste and ports on the Gulf Coast of the United States. In July 1914, a few days before the First World War began, she and another Unione Austriaca ship, Clara, steamed from Pensacola to New Orleans. When the war began, on 3 August 1914, Germany and Austria-Hungary ordered their merchant ships to return home if possible, or otherwise take shelter in a neutral port. Unione Austriaca's fleet included 30 ocean-going steamships, eight of which took refuge in US ports. Teresa and Clara remained in New Orleans, along with a third Unione Austriaca ship, Anna. The liner Martha Washington sheltered in New York, with the cargo ships Dora and Ida. Two other cargo ships, Erny and Lucia, sheltered in Boston and Pensacola respectively.

On 6 April 1917, the US declared war against Germany, and seized all German ships in its ports. The US did not declare war against Austria-Hungary, so the 14 Austro-Hungarian ships in US ports were not seized. However, two days later, Austria-Hungary terminated diplomatic relations with the US, so the US responded by seizing all of those Austro-Hungarian ships. The crews were removed, and taken into the custody of the United States Department of Labor. United States Customs Service guards were placed on all of the seized ships.

== US purchase ==
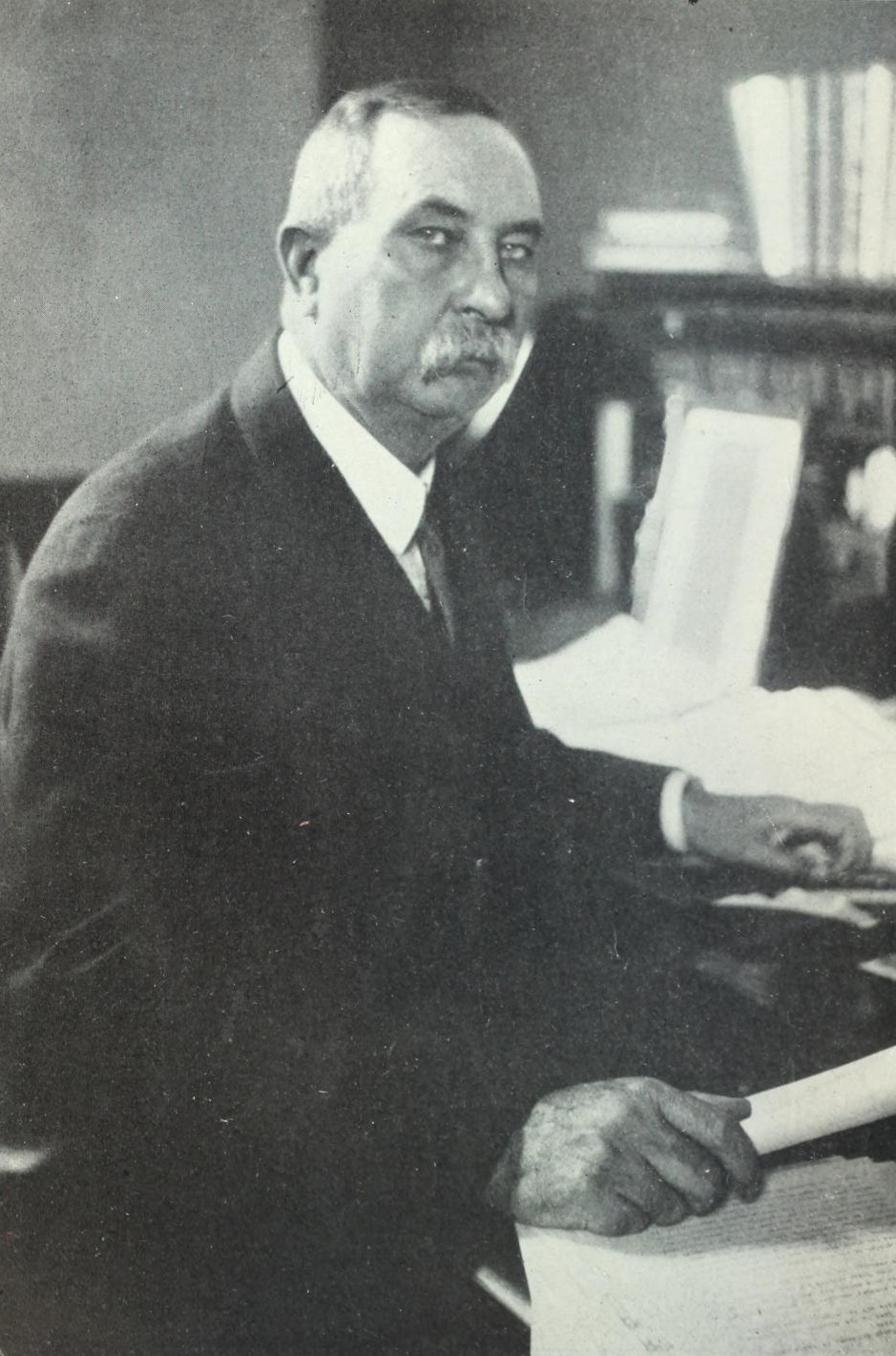
Benjamin Franklin Yoakum

The eight Unione Austriaca ships remained the property of their Austro-Hungarian owners. Soon after they were seized, two New York shipbrokers, George Carden and Anderson Herd, bought all seven of Unione Austriaca's cargo ships, including Teresa, for $6,370,771, which was said to be about half of their true value. The price included $159,209 commission, which was shared between a number of intermediaries, including a Hungarian Count Rudolf Festetics who was a reserve officer in the Austro-Hungarian Navy, and a French Baron Robert Oppenheim. Two days after the sale, a consortium of industrialists and financiers offered Carden and Herd $10,060,000 for the seven ships. The consortium comprised Benjamin Franklin Yoakum, Percy Rivington Pyne II, JH Carpenter, August Heckscher, and Robert Walton Goelet. Carden and Herd declined the offer, believing that the ships were worth more.

William Denman, Chairman of the USSB, then summoned Carden and Herd's attorney to Washington, where he told him the US government wanted the ships. Carden and Herd were told that President Wilson wanted them to sell the ships to the government at cost price, without taking a profit. After consulting with Yoakum, Carden and Herd agreed to sell them to the government. The government paid Carden and Herd $6,778,006, which was $407,235 more than the brokers paid for the ships.

== US government ownership ==
On 27 September 1917, the US Army chartered Teresa from the USSB, with a crew of civilian merchant seafarers. By June 1918, she was registered in New York, her US official number was 215296, and her code letters were LHMC. However, a dispute arose between the US Army quartermaster and Teresa's Master, which led the Army to ask the US Navy to crew the ship. On 9 January 1918, the Navy commissioned her at Newport News, Virginia as USS Teresa, with the Naval Registry 4478.

Teresa was refitted for naval service, defensively armed with two 4-inch/40-caliber guns, and assigned to the Naval Overseas Transport Service. On 29 January 1918 left Newport News for New York, where she loaded Army supplies, before returning to Norfolk. On 23 February, she left Norfolk in a convoy, and on 4 March she reached Saint-Nazaire in France. Over the next 16 months, Teresa made four further return trips between the US and France. She arrived at Philadelphia on 28 June 1919, was decommissioned there on 19 July, and returned to the USSB the same day.

By July 1919, Teresa was equipped with wireless telegraphy, and the Emergency Fleet Corporation was managing her for the USSB. However, by July 1920, no manager was listed for her, which may mean that she was laid up.

== Greek ownership ==
In the second half of 1923 or the first half of 1924, a Greek shipowner, George Pervolaris, bought Teresa, renamed her Demokratia, and registered her in Chios. By 1926, her code letters were JFHD. In the second half of 1932, Demokratia was renamed Phoenix. On 14 November 1932, she arrived in Genoa in Italy to be scrapped.

== Bibliography ==
- Bureau of Navigation (1918). Fiftieth Annual List of Merchant Vessels of the United States. Washington, DC: United States Department of Commerce and Labor – via HyperWar.
- Haws, Duncan (2001). Italia 1881–2001. Merchant Fleets. Vol. 40. Pembroke. ISBN 0-946378-43-6.
- Lloyd's Register of British and Foreign Shipping. Vol. I.–Steamers. London: Lloyd's Register of Shipping. 1900 – via Internet Archive.
- Lloyd's Register of British and Foreign Shipping. Vol. I.–Steamers. London: Lloyd's Register of Shipping. 1901 – via Internet Archive.
- Lloyd's Register of British and Foreign Shipping. Vol. I.–Steamers. London: Lloyd's Register of Shipping. 1905 – via Internet Archive.
- Lloyd's Register of Shipping. Vol. II.–Steamers. London: Lloyd's Register of Shipping. 1919 – via Internet Archive.
- Lloyd's Register of Shipping. Vol. II.–Steamers. London: Lloyd's Register of Shipping. 1920 – via Internet Archive.
- Lloyd's Register of Shipping. Vol. II.–Steamers and Motor Vessels. London: Lloyd's Register of Shipping. 1923 – via Internet Archive.
- Lloyd's Register of Shipping. Vol. II.–Steamers and Motorships. London: Lloyd's Register of Shipping. 1926 – via Internet Archive.
- Lloyd's Register of Shipping. Vol. II.–Steamers and Motorships of 300 Tons Gross and Over. London: Lloyd's Register of Shipping. 1932 – via Southampton City Council.
- Mayer, Horst F; Winkler, Dieter (1987). In Allen Häfen War Österreich (in German). Vienna: Edition S. ISBN 3-7046-0079-2.
