= John Boyd (Texas politician) =

Senator, Republic of Texas; state senator, Texas

- Born: August 7, 1796; Nashville, Tennessee, US
- Died: May 4, 1873 (aged 76)
- Occupations: settler, politician, philanthropist
- Spouse: Elizabeth McLean
- Relatives: Linn Boyd (brother)

John Boyd ( August 7, 1796 – May 4, 1873) was an American settler and politician. He served as a Congressman for the Republic of Texas and as a member of the Texas Senate.

== Early life ==
John Boyd was born on August 7, 1796, in Nashville, Tennessee. His father was Abraham Boyd and his mother, Nancy Linn. His brother, Linn Boyd, went on to serve as the Speaker of the United States House of Representatives from 1851 to 1855.

== Career ==
By 1835, Boyd settled in Sabine County, Texas, with his wife and children. He then served in the Texas Revolution.

Boyd served as a member of the Congress of the Republic of Texas from 1836 to 1845. In 1845, he moved to Limestone County, Texas, where he staked a claim near the Tehuacana Hills, northwest of Tehuacana.

From 1862 to 1863, Boyd served in the Texas Senate. By then, he had become a secessionist, in favor of the Confederate States of America.

Boyd was also a landowner in Nashville. He donated 11,000 acres (4,500 ha) of land as well as financial assistance for the establishment of Trinity University.

== Personal life, death and legacy ==
Boyd married Elizabeth McLean. They had nine children, but only three reached adulthood. He was a member of the Cumberland Presbyterian Church.

Boyd died on May 4, 1873. After his death, the land he owned in Nashville, Tennessee was inherited by his granddaughter, Rachel Douglas Boyd Smiley, the wife of Senator Henry S. Foote. They built a house, Old Central, which was later acquired by Vanderbilt University, on whose campus it still stands today.
