= Mexia News =

The Mexia News
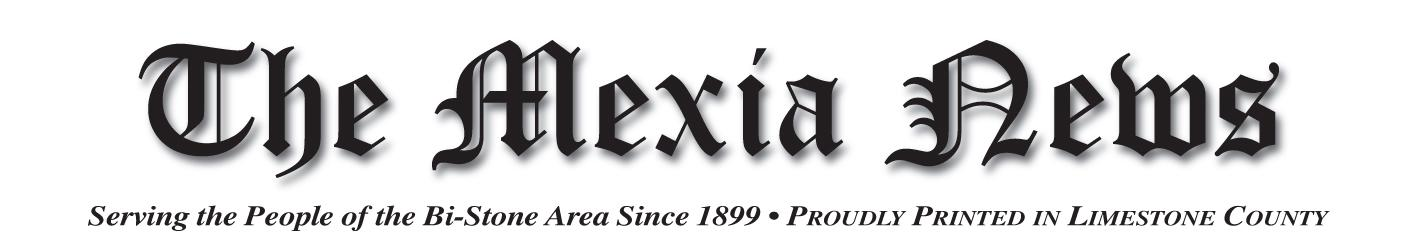
- Type: Weekly newspaper
- Format: Broadsheet
- Owner: Times Media Group
- Publisher: Mandy Farrow
- Editor: Alicia Venter
- Founded: 1899
- Headquarters: 214 North Railroad Street; Mexia, Texas 76667; United States
- Circulation: 1,360 (as of 2023)
- Website: mexiadailynews.com

The Mexia News is a weekly newspaper published in Mexia, Texas. It is owned by Times Media Group in Tempe, Arizona.
