= C. H. Yoakum =

American politician and lawyer (1849–1909)

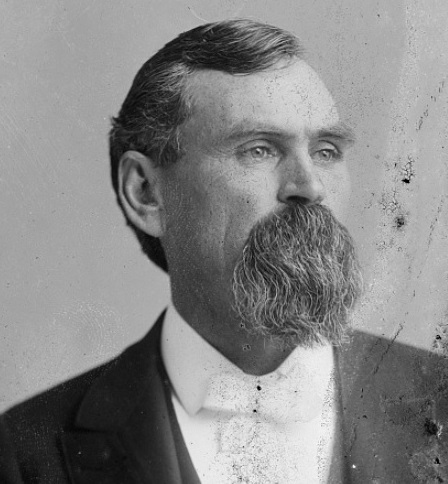
- Portrait of Yoakum by Charles Milton Bell, taken between February 1894 and February 1901

Member of the U.S. House of Representatives from Texas's 3rd district
- In office March 4, 1895 – March 3, 1897
- Preceded by: Constantine B. Kilgore
- Succeeded by: Reese C. De Graffenreid

Member of the Texas Senate from the 5th district
- In office January 10, 1892 – September 10, 1896

Personal details
- Born: Charles Henderson Yoakum; July 10, 1849 Tehuacana, Texas, US
- Died: January 1, 1909 (aged 59) Fort Worth, Texas, US
- Party: Democratic
- Relations: Benjamin Franklin Yoakum (brother); Henderson King Yoakum (uncle)
- Parent: Franklin Laughlin Yoakum (father)
- Occupation: Politician, lawyer

Charles Henderson Yoakum (July 10, 1849 – January 1, 1909) was an American politician and lawyer. A Democrat, he was a member of the United States House of Representatives from Texas.

Born near Tehuacana, Texas, Yoakum attended college and read law. He worked as a lawyer and held several district court offices. He served in the Texas Senate from 1892 to 1896, then in the House from 1895 to 1897. Afterwards, he was made general attorney of the St. Louis–San Francisco Railway.

== Early life and education ==
Yoakum was born on July 10, 1849, near Tehuacana, Texas (then part of Lincoln County), though the Houston Post states he was born in Cherokee County. He was the son of Franklin Laughlin Yoakum and Narcissus (née Teague) Yoakum. He had two brothers, one of whom was Benjamin Franklin Yoakum. His uncle was Henderson King Yoakum. He studied at Cherokee County and Cumberland College and Larissa College.

== Career ==
Yoakum worked as an educator and read law in his spare time. In 1874, he was admitted to the bar, after which he began practicing law in Emory. In 1883, he moved to Greenville, practicing law there also. In 1876, he was prosecutor for Rains County, and from 1886 to 1890, was district attorney of the 8th Texas Judicial District Court.

Yoakum was a Democrat. From January 10, 1892, to September 10, 1896, he served in the Texas Senate, representing the 5th district. The Austin American-Statesman states he also served in the Texas House of Representatives. He was a member of the United States House of Representatives, from March 4, 1895, to March 3, 1897, representing Texas's 3rd district. He declined candidacy in the following election due to illness. Ideologically, he was liberal.

After serving in Congress, Yoakum returned to practicing law in Greenville. From either fall 1898 or 1900, to 1904, he lived in Los Angeles. He then moved to Fort Worth, as he had been named general attorney of the St. Louis–San Francisco Railway.

== Personal life and death ==
Yoakum was married and had a daughter. He was a member of the Methodist Episcopal Church, South, as well as a member of the Freemasons and the Independent Order of Odd Fellows. He died on January 1, 1909, aged 59, in Fort Worth from a stroke and a myocardial infraction, and was buried on his family plot at Myrtle Cemetery, in Ennis.

U.S. House of Representatives
Preceded by Constantine B. Kilgore	Member of the U.S. House of Representatives from Texas's 3rd congressional district 1895–1897	Succeeded by Reese C. De Graffenreid
