= Kelvin Beachum =

American football player (born 1989)

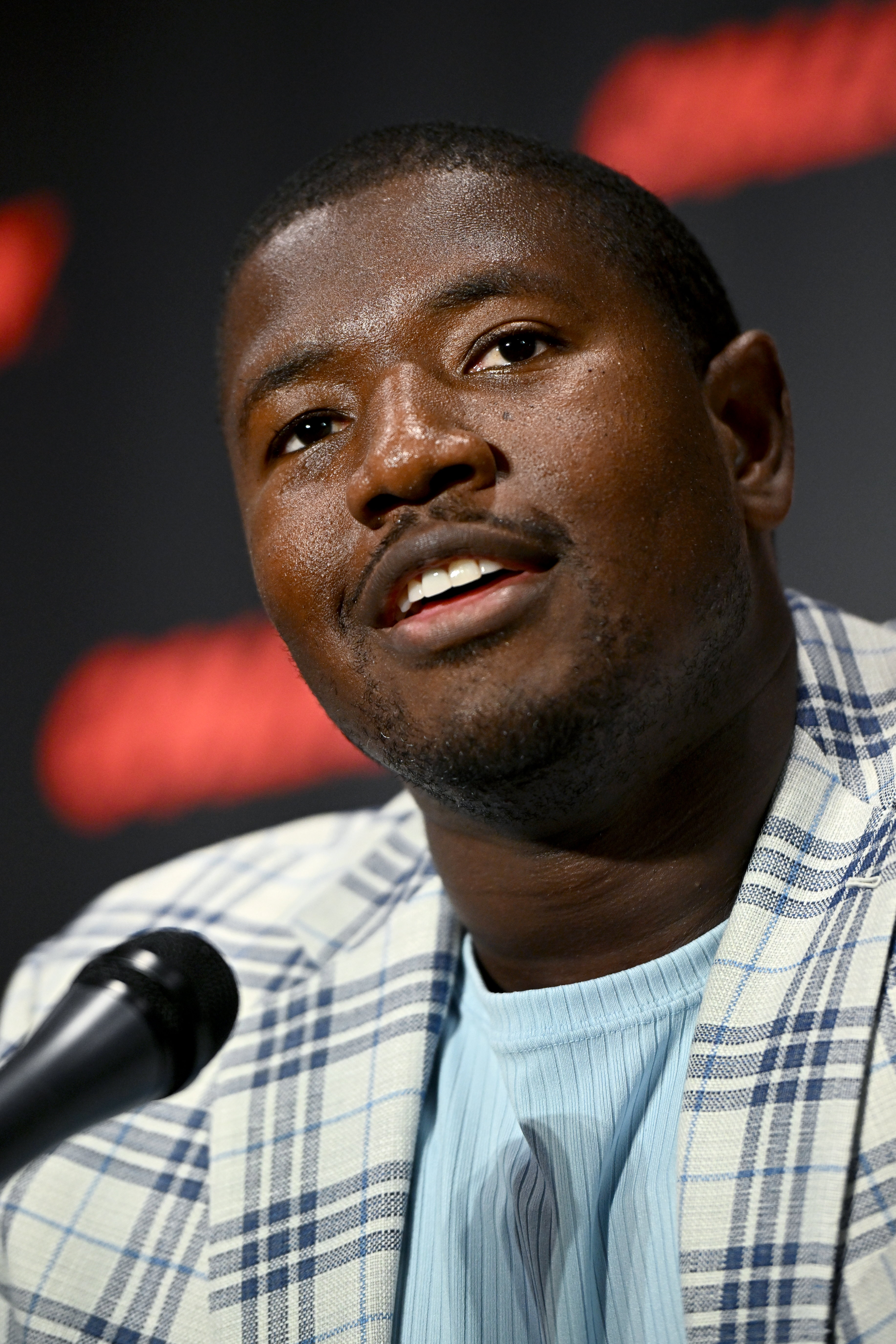
- Beachum in 2023

Profile
- Position: Offensive tackle

Personal information
- Born: June 8, 1989 (age 37); Mexia, Texas, U.S.
- Listed height: 6 ft 3 in (1.91 m)
- Listed weight: 308 lb (140 kg)

Career information
- High school: Mexia (TX)
- College: SMU (2007–2011)
- NFL draft: 2012: 7th round, 248th overall pick

Career history
- Pittsburgh Steelers (2012–2015); Jacksonville Jaguars (2016); New York Jets (2017–2019); Arizona Cardinals (2020–2025)

Awards and highlights
- 2× First-team All-C-USA (2010, 2011); Second-team All-C-USA (2009)

Career NFL statistics as of Week 5, 2025
- Games played: 184
- Games started: 162
- Stats at Pro Football Reference

Kelvin Lee Beachum Jr. (born June 8, 1989) is an American professional football offensive tackle. He played college football for the SMU Mustangs and was selected by the Pittsburgh Steelers in the seventh round of the 2012 NFL draft. He has also played for the Jacksonville Jaguars and New York Jets, and Arizona Cardinals.

== College career ==
Beachum played offensive left tackle at Southern Methodist University. He was a four-year starter for the Mustangs and competed in the NFLPA Collegiate Bowl. He played alongside Josh LeRibeus, who was later picked in the third round of the NFL draft by the Washington Redskins.

== Professional career ==
=== Pre-draft ===
Coming out of college, Beachum was projected by the majority of analysts to be selected in the seventh round or be a priority undrafted free agent. He was ranked as the 24th best offensive guard although he played tackle in college. Many analysts and scouts were conflicted on his position due to his height. Beachum was invited to the NFL Combine as an offensive tackle and was able to complete all the drills and positional workouts. On May 14, 2012, he participated at Southern Methodist University's Pro Day and decided to do only the bench. Although he lacked size for an offensive tackle, scouts complimented his lateral movement and quickness off the ball.

Pre-draft measurables
Height	Weight	Arm length	Hand span	40-yard dash	10-yard split	20-yard split	20-yard shuttle	Three-cone drill	Vertical jump	Broad jump	Bench press
6 ft 2 7/8 in (1.90 m)	303 lb (137 kg)	33 1/4 in (0.84 m)	9 3/8 in (0.24 m)	5.44 s	1.85 s	3.11 s	4.80 s	7.79 s	28.5 in (0.72 m)	8 ft 5 in (2.57 m)	19 reps
All values from NFL Combine

=== Pittsburgh Steelers ===
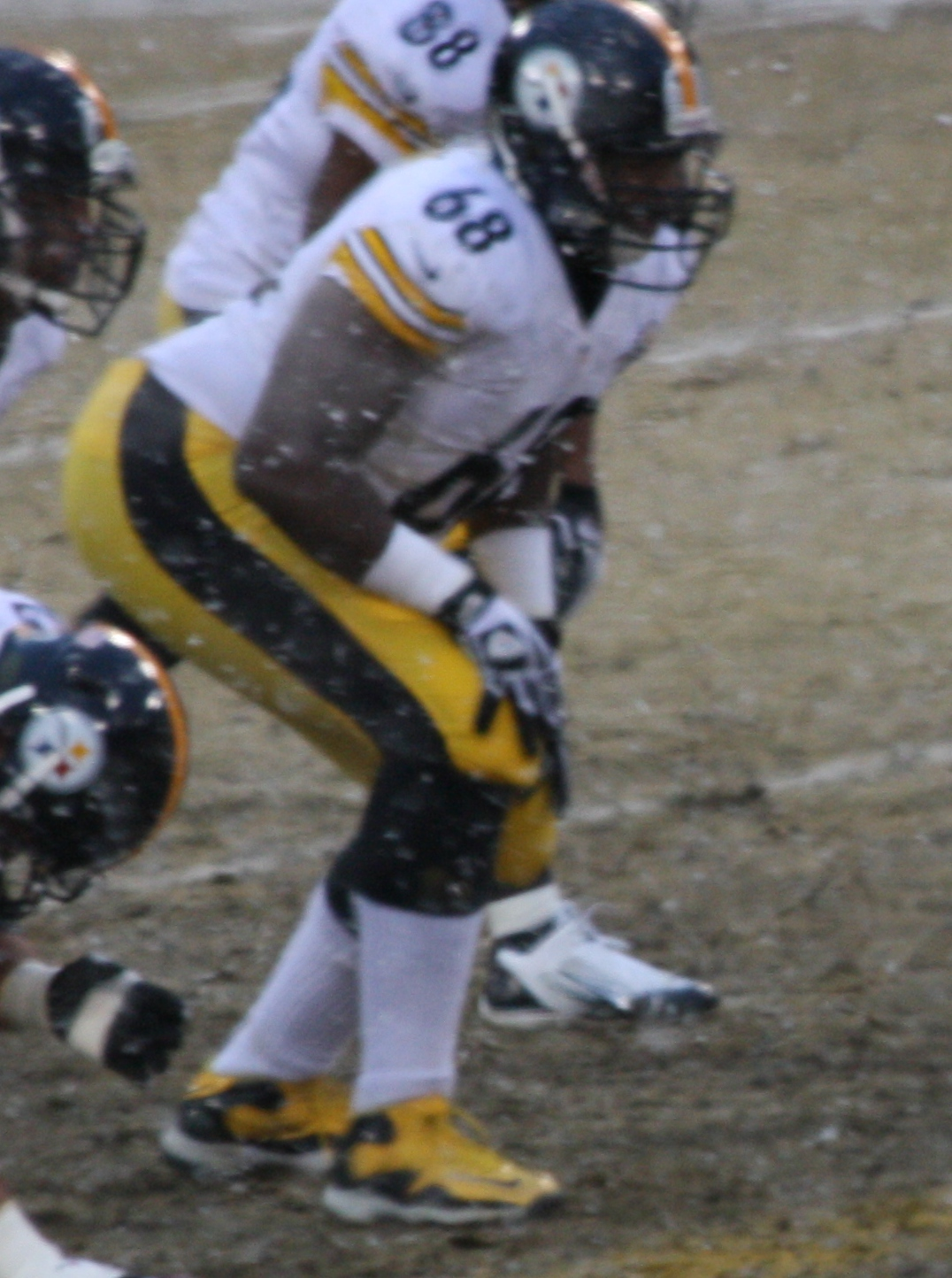
Beachum with the Steelers in 2013

==== 2012 ====
The Pittsburgh Steelers selected Beachum in the seventh round (248th overall) of the 2012 NFL draft. He was the 20th and last offensive tackle taken and was the third offensive lineman drafted by the Steelers in the draft.

On May 10, 2012, the Steelers signed Beachum to a four-year, $2.14 million contract with a signing bonus of $49,816.

He entered training camp competing with Max Starks, Marcus Gilbert, Mike Adams, and Chris Scott for a starting offensive tackle position. The Steelers named him the third left tackle on their depth chart behind Starks and Adams to begin the regular season.

On September 23, 2012, Beachum made his professional regular season debut in a 34–31 loss to the Oakland Raiders. On November 18, 2012, he earned his first career start at right tackle in a 13–10 loss to the Baltimore Ravens after Marcus Gilbert was placed on injured reserve with torn tendons in his ankle and backup Mike Adams had an ankle injury. He finished his rookie season with a total of five starts in seven games, played 314 offensive snaps, and earned a -2.8 grade from Pro Football Focus (PFF). Beachum was graded -2.9 in pass blocking after allowing 18 pressures on 205 pass blocking snaps.

==== 2013 ====
With the departure of Starks, Beachum entered training camp competing for the vacant left tackle position with Gilbert and Adams. He was named the backup to starting right tackle Gilbert and starting left tackle Adams to begin the regular season. He earned his first start of the season in the Steelers season-opener, beginning the game as a tight end, during a 16–9 loss to the Tennessee Titans. During a Week 6 matchup against the Tennessee Titans, Beachum was named the starting left tackle in place of Adams and remained the starter for the remainder of the season. Beachum finished the 2013 season with 12 starts in 15 games and played 840 offensive snaps, earning an -0.4 grade from PFF.

==== 2014 ====
Beachum entered the regular season in 2014 as the Steeler's de facto starting left tackle. He finished his third season starting all 16 regular season games and was ranked the fifth best left tackle by PFF. He also earned the fifth highest grade among tackles, finishing with a +21.7 overall grade from PFF and a 97.5 grade in pass blocking efficiency. Beachum finished third in pass blocking efficiency, behind only Andrew Whitworth and Joe Thomas.

Entering his last year of his rookie contract, the Steelers offered Beachum a contract extension, but he declined their offer.

==== 2015 ====
Beachum entered his final year on his rookie contract in 2015 and started the regular season at left tackle. On October 18, 2015, he left during a 25–13 victory over the Arizona Cardinals after tearing his left anterior cruciate ligament. He was placed on injured reserve for the remainder of the season.

On March 9, 2016, Beachum became a free agent and was ranked by PFF as the second best free agent offensive tackle behind Cordy Glenn. He met with multiple teams, including the New York Jets, Seattle Seahawks, and Jacksonville Jaguars.

While with the Steelers, he appeared in 44 games with 39 starts.

=== Jacksonville Jaguars ===
On March 15, 2016, the Jacksonville Jaguars signed Beachum to a one-year, $5 million contract that included a four-year, $40 million option with $1.5 million guaranteed.

He entered his first training camp with the Jaguars competing with Luke Joeckel to be the starting left tackle. On August 30, 2016, head coach Gus Bradley named him the starting left tackle to begin the regular season. Beachum made his first start for the Jacksonville Jaguars in their season-opening 27–23 loss to the Green Bay Packers. He suffered a concussion in a Week 2 matchup against the San Diego Chargers and was inactive for Week 3. He returned the following game and started the last 13 games of the regular season. Beachum finished his first season with the Jaguars starting in 15 games and was considered a disappointment after surrendering 49 quarterback pressures. The 49 quarterback pressures was the 11th most by any offensive tackles in 2016. He received a 44.3 PFF production grade that ranked him 63rd out of 78th offensive tackles that qualified.

On February 15, 2017, the Jaguars declined Beachum's four-year option, making him a free agent.

=== New York Jets ===
On March 10, 2017, the New York Jets signed Beachum to a three-year, $24 million contract that included $12 million guaranteed and a signing bonus of $4.5 million.

He entered training camp competing against Ben Ijalana for the job as the starting left tackle that was left vacant after the departure of Ryan Clady. Head coach Todd Bowles named Beachum the starting left tackle to begin the regular season. He started all 16 games for the Jets in 2017 and performed fairly well, receiving a 72.7 overall grade by PFF. In comparison, the Jets former starting left tackle, Ryan Clady, received an overall grade of 47.2 from PFF in 2016.

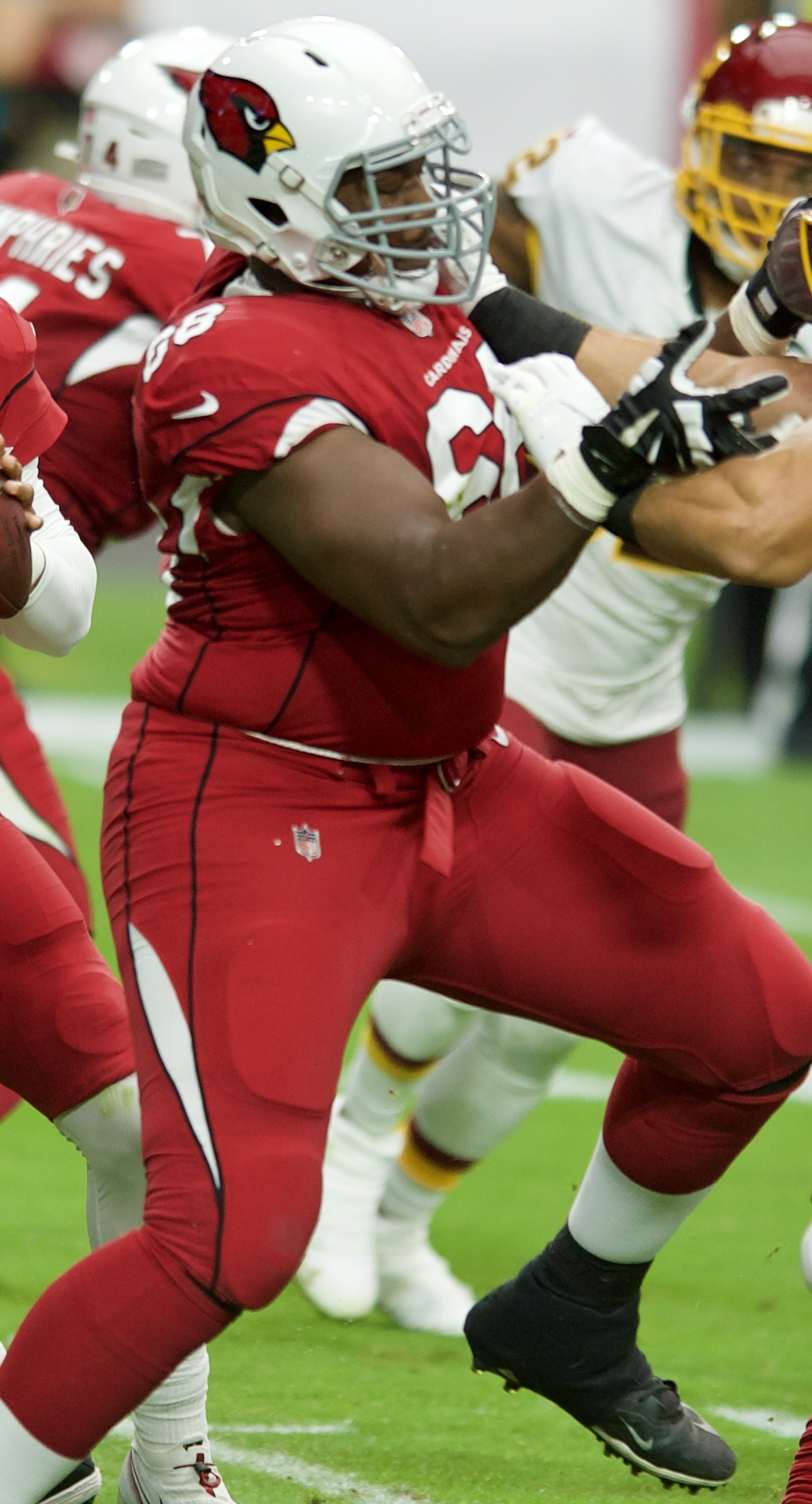
Beachum with the Cardinals in 2020

=== Arizona Cardinals ===
On July 17, 2020, the Arizona Cardinals signed Beachum to a one-year contract. He started all 16 games at right tackle for the Cardinals in 2020.

On March 16, 2021, Beachum signed a two-year, $4 million contract extension with the Cardinals.

Beachum agreed to a two-year, $5.15 million contract extension on March 14, 2023.

On April 3, 2025, Beachum signed a one-year contract to return to the Cardinals.

== NFLPA ==
Beachum is an advisory board member of the National Football League Players Association (NFLPA), joining as an inaugural member of the board in 2016.

He has been named the weekly NFL Players Association Community MVP Award a record five times.

== In media ==
In 2017, Beachum appeared on an episode of the HGTV program Fixer Upper, in which he helped his parents renovate a $130,000 new house by giving them an extra $100,000 for their renovation budget.

== Personal life ==
Beachum is married to Jessica Beachum. They have three children. Beachum is a Christian.

Beachum is a supporter of Bread for the World, Feeding America, and World Vision.
