= Tehuacana Hills =

Coordinates: 31°44′40″N 96°33′05″W

The Tehuacana Hills (/təˈwɑːkənə/; Spanish pronunciation: [tewaˈkana]) are a series of hills in Limestone County, Texas.

== Location ==
The hills are located northwest of Tehuacana in Limestone County, Texas. They are "650 feet above sea level and 150 feet higher than the surrounding area".

== History ==
In 1797, Philip Nolan encountered the Tawakoni people, a Native American tribe of the Tawakoni ethnic group, living on the hills and surrounding area. They were sedentary farmers.

By 1830, the Cherokee tribe had exterminated the Tawakoni by burning the tall grass growing on their settlement. There is a legend in Texas folklore about a Tawakoni Ghost looking down from the hills.

In 1852, Tehuacana Academy was established at this location. Meanwhile, John Boyd, a Tennessee-born white settler, staked a claim on the land. He later donated 1,100 acres for the establishment of Trinity University.
