= Henderson King Yoakum =

American politician and historian (1810–1856)

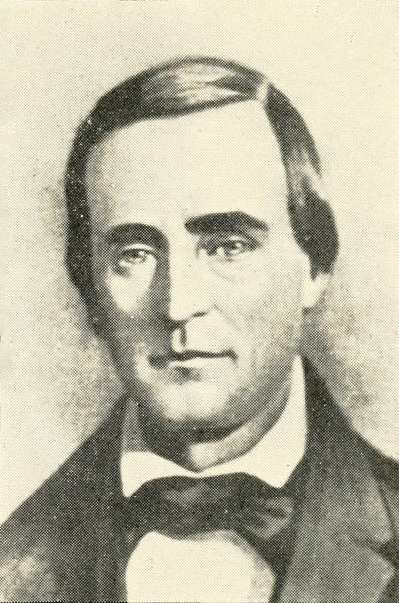

Member of the Tennessee Senate
- In office 1839–1845

Texas State Historian
- In office 1849

Personal details
- Born: September 6, 1810 Claiborne County, Tennessee, US
- Died: November 30, 1856 (aged 46) Houston, Texas, US
- Resting place: Oakwood Cemetery
- Party: Democratic
- Education: United States Military Academy
- Occupation: Politician, historian, lawyer, military officer

Military service
- Allegiance: United States
- Rank: Colonel
- Battles/wars: Cherokee removal; Mexican–American War; Battle of Monterrey

Henderson King Yoakum (September 6, 1810 – November 30, 1856) was an American politician, historian, lawyer, and military officer.

Born in Tennessee, Yoakum studied at the United States Military Academy. As a soldier, he served in the Cherokee removal and the Mexican–American War. For a time, he was a member of the Tennessee Senate. He then moved to Texas, where he worked as a lawyer and published a history book on the state. Yoakum County, Texas, is named for him.

== Early life and education ==
Yoakum was born on September 6, 1810, in Claiborne County, Tennessee, the son of George Yoakum II and Mary Ann (née Maddy) Yoakum. He was of Dutch descent. His brother was Franklin Laughlin Yoakum, and his nephews were Benjamin Franklin Yoakum and C. H. Yoakum.

In 1832, Yoakum graduated from the United States Military Academy. His graduating class was 45 students large, with him ranking 21st. He was ranked lieutenant before resigning in spring 1833.

== Career ==
After resigning, Yoakum moved to Murfreesboro, where he practiced law under James Coffield Mitchell. He also managed real estate. In 1836, he served as captain of the Murfreesboro Sentinels – a cavalry company – near the Sabine River, under Edmund P. Gaines.

Yoakum was a Democrat. He was mayor of Murfreesboro from 1837 to 1843. In 1838, he participated in the Cherokee removal as a Tennessee infantry colonel. From 1839 to 1845, he was a member of the Tennessee Senate, as which he pushed for Texas annexation. Ideologically, the Tennessee Encyclopedia identified him as a "Jacksonian Stalwart". He aligned with James K. Polk.

Yoakum left Tennessee due to the state being dominated by the Whigs; Polk lost the 1844 United States presidential election in Tennessee, despite it being his home state. He moved to Huntsville, Texas on October 6, 1845, and on December 2 of the same year, was admitted to the State Bar of Texas. He helped make Huntsville the county seat of Walker County.

During the Mexican–American War, Yoakum served as a private under John Coffee Hays, later as a lieutenant under James Gillaspie. He fought in the Battle of Monterrey. He returned to Huntsville on October 2, 1846, where he continued practicing law.

In 1849, Yoakum served as Texas State Historian. Also in 1849, he wrote the charter for Austin College, serving as a trustee from then until 1856. He also helped create Andrew Female College. In 1859, he became director of the Huntsville Unit. In July 1853, he moved to Shepherd's Valley. In 1865, he published History of Texas from Its First Settlement in 1685 to Its Annexation to the United States in 1846, a two-volume history book. He owned over 10,000 acres of land in five counties of East Texas.

== Personal life and death ==
On February 13, 1833, Yoakum married Evaline Cannon; they had five children together. He was Methodist and a Freemason. He refrained from the use of liquor and profanity.

In fall 1856, Yoakum travelled to Houston to give a Masonic courtoom speech. There, he was sickened by tuberculosis, dying from the disease there on November 30 of the same year, in the house of Peter W. Gray. He was buried at Oakwood Cemetery, in Huntsville; his friend Sam Houston is buried beside him, per Houston's dying wish. In 1876, Yoakum County was named for him. In 1936, a commemorative plaque was dedicated by the Texas Centennial Commission, at his house in Shepherd's Valley, with another being placed in 2016. In 1976, a plaque was installed in Huntsville.
