= Quentin Durward Corley =

American judge

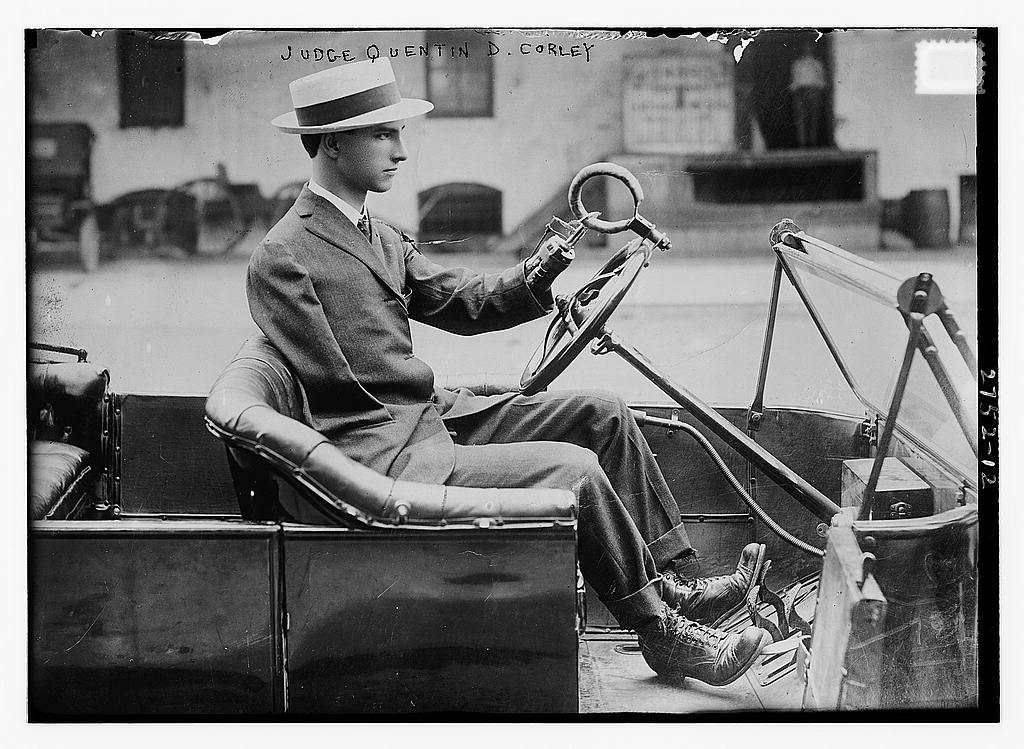
Judge Corley in 1916, driving his automobile using a prosthesis of his own invention.

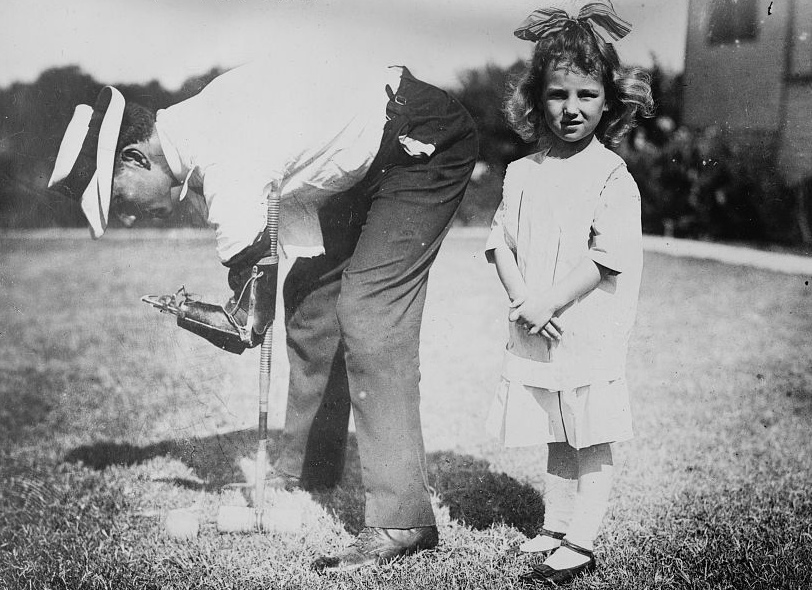

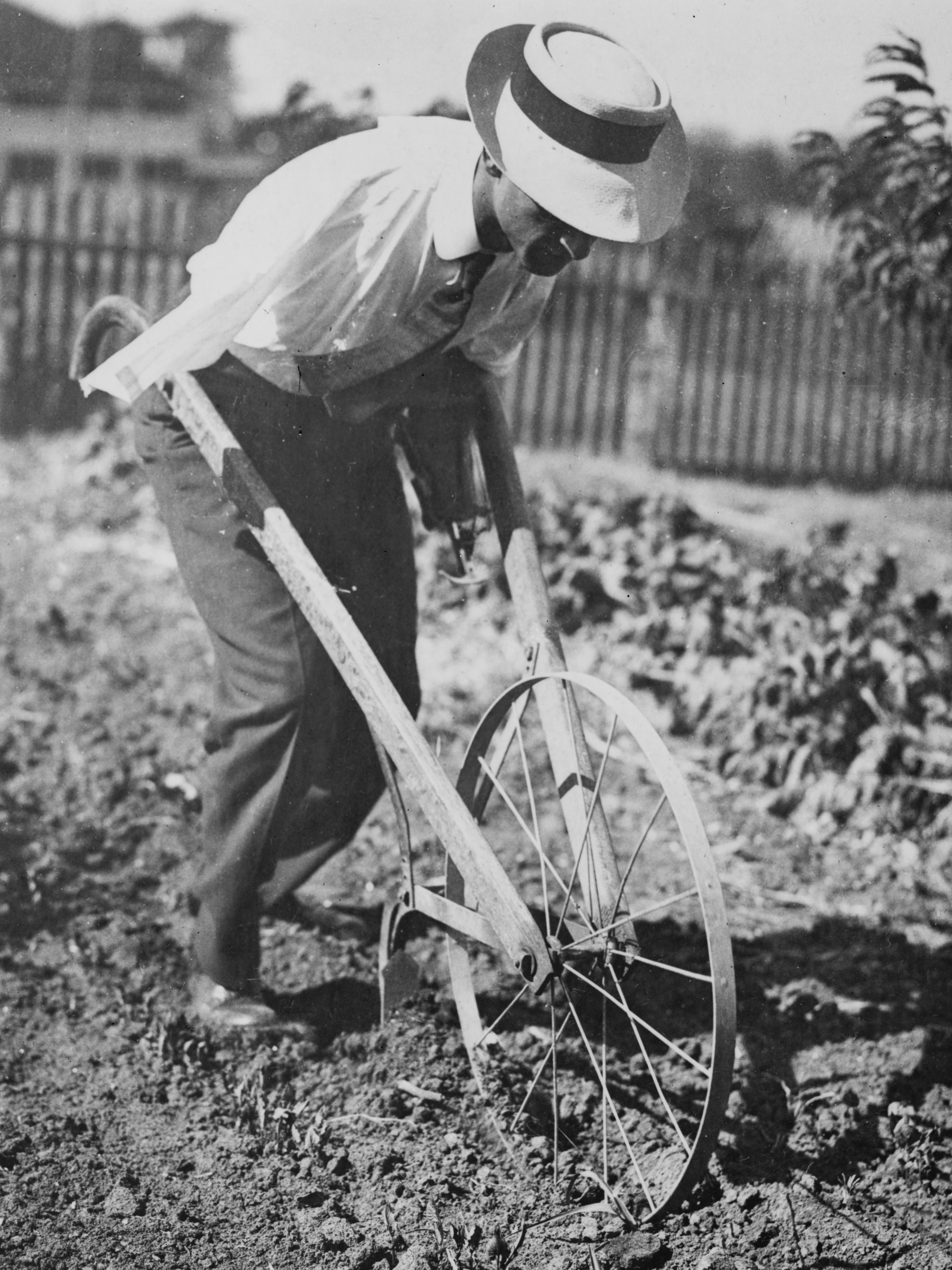
Quentin Corley plowing in the 1910s

Quentin Durward Corley, Sr. (January 21, 1884 - April 22, 1980) was a Texas circuit judge.

== Biography ==
He was born in Mexia, Texas on January 21, 1884, to Daniel Jacob Corley (1852–1948) and Mary Louise California (1851–1946). His parents were from Alabama, and moved to Texas in 1874. Quentin moved to Dallas, Texas in 1895. In 1901 he graduated from the Oak Cliff high school. On September 18, 1905, in Utica, New York he was in a railroad accident and lost both hands and one arm and shoulder. Within two years he invented and patented an artificial limb.

He went on to study law in the offices of Muse & Allen in Dallas, and in 1907 passed the Dallas County, Texas bar. In 1908 he was elected to the office of justice of the peace, and his service in that capacity was of such a character that in the campaign of 1912 he was elected a county judge. He died on April 22, 1980, in Dallas, Texas.

== Patents ==
- Improvements in and relating to artificial arms (1920)

== Legacy ==
- Quentin D. Corley Academy
