= Mexia High School =

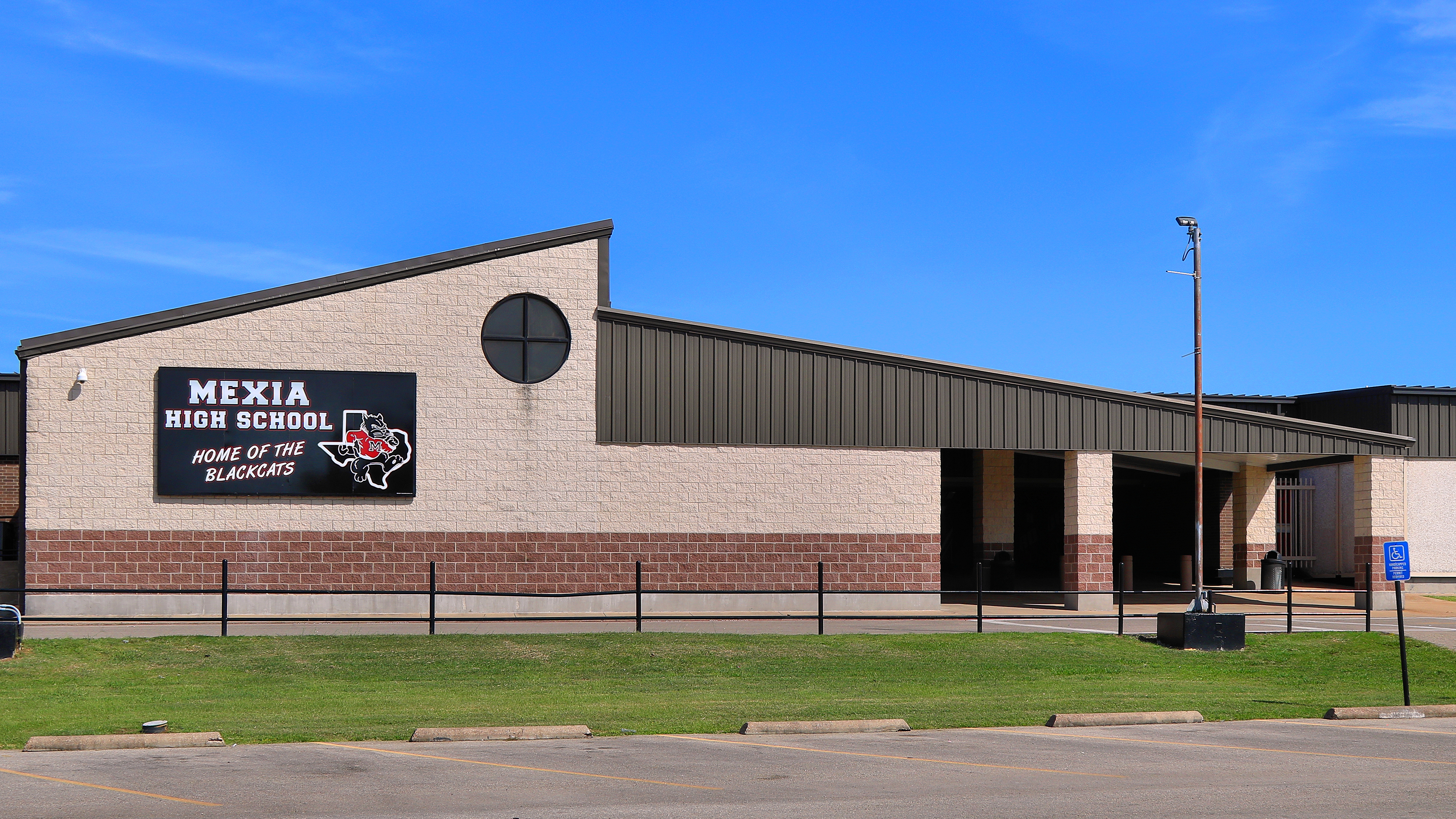
- Front entry area of Mexia High School

Location
- 1120 North Ross Avenue; Mexia, Texas 76667-2299; United States
- Coordinates: 31.695°N 96.473°W

Information
- Type: Public high school
- School district: Mexia Independent School District
- NCES School ID: 483042003425
- Principal: (Formerly) Val Sunday (February 14, 1975 - July 24, 2019), (Current) Marus Wilson
- Teaching staff: 40.28 (on an FTE basis)
- Grades: 9–12
- Enrollment: 511 (2023-2024)
- Student to teacher ratio: 12.69
- Colors: Black and Crimson
- Athletics conference: UIL Class 3A
- Mascot: Blackcats/Lady Cats
- Yearbook: Blackcat
- Website: www.mexiaisd.net

Mexia High School is a public high school in Mexia, Texas, United States. It is part of the Mexia Independent School District and classified as a 3A school by the University Interscholastic League. In 2015, the school was rated "Met Standard" by the Texas Education Agency.

In addition to Mexia, the district's boundary includes Tehuacana.

== Athletics ==
The Mexia Blackcats/Lady cats compete in various sports including volleyball, cross country, football, basketball, powerlifting, soccer, golf, tennis, track, and softball and baseball.

=== State titles ===
- Boys Basketball
  - 1999(3A)
  - 2001(3A)
- Girls Basketball
  - 2013(3A)
- Football
  - 1989(3A)
- Boys Golf
  - 1998(3A)

=== Boys State Finalists ===
- Football
  - 1949(1A)
- Basketball
  - 1968 (2A)(Runner up lost to Kirbyville 52-57)
  - 2011 (3A)(Finalist lost to Burkburnett 68-77)

== Theater ==
- One Act Play
  - 1927(All), 2008(3A)

== Notable alumni ==
- Anna Nicole Smith, model, dropped out during her sophomore year.
- Ray Rhodes, former NFL head coach and defensive back, class of 1969.
- Kelvin Beachum, professional football player
- Cindy Walker, Songwriter. lived there many years and is laid to rest in Mexia Cemetery.
