= Mexia Independent School District =

School district in Texas

Mexia Independent School District is a public school district based in Mexia, Texas (USA).

In addition to Mexia, the district serves the town of Tehuacana. Located in Limestone County, a very small portion of the district extends into Freestone County.

In 2009, the school district was rated "academically acceptable" by the Texas Education Agency.

== Schools ==
- Mexia High School (Grades 9-12)
- Mexia Junior High (Grades 6-8)
- R.Q. Sims Intermediate (Grades 3-5)
- A.B. McBay Elementary (Grades PK-2)
