= USS Suwanee (ID-1320) =

United States Navy transport commissioned in 1919

Coordinates: 10°3′N 63°42′E

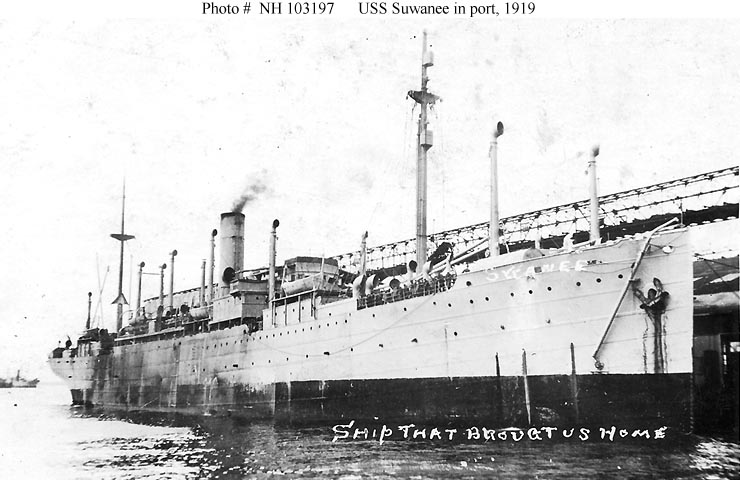
- USS Suwanee in 1919.

History

United States
- Name: USS Suwanee
- Namesake: An alternative spelling for the Suwannee River in Georgia and Florida (previous name retained)
- Builder: Bremer-Vulkan Works, Vegesack, Germany
- Completed: 1913
- Acquired: 11 April 1919
- Commissioned: 11 April 1919
- Decommissioned: 4 October 1919
- Fate: Transferred to United States Shipping Board 4 October 1919; Returned to commercial service
- Notes: In commercial service as German cargo ship SS Mark from 1913-1917 and as American cargo ship SS Suwanee from 1917-1919; renamed SS Poznan sometime after 1919 return to commercial service

General characteristics
- Type: Transport
- Tonnage: 6,579 Gross register tons
- Displacement: 16,240 tons
- Length: 491 ft 2 in (149.71 m)
- Beam: 59 ft 1 in (18.01 m)
- Draft: 26 ft (7.9 m) (mean)
- Propulsion: Steam engine
- Speed: 12.9 knots

USS Suwanee (ID-1320) was a United States Navy transport in commission in 1919. She was the second ship to carry her name.

== Construction and service history ==
Suwanee was built as the German cargo ship SS Mark in 1913 at Vegesack, Germany, by Bremer-Vulkan Works for the North German Lloyd Line. She was the fifth freighter of the Rheinland-Class built for the Australian Freight Line via the Cape. When World War I began in August 1914, Mark was in Japan and left Kobe with 4,000 t of coal for the Squadron of Admiral Spee. Supplying the ships of the Imperial Navy at Pagan Island, she at last served for some days the auxiliary cruisers SMS Prinz Eitel Friedrich and Cormoran. On 7 October 1914 she took refuge at Manila on Luzon in the Philippine Islands, then a neutral territory of the United States, to avoid capture or destruction by Allied naval forces. She was still there when the United States entered the war on the side of the Allies in April 1917. The United States Government seized her and placed her under the control of the United States Shipping Board. Renamed SS Suwanee, she served as an American civilian cargo ship through the end of World War I on 11 November 1918 and into early 1919.

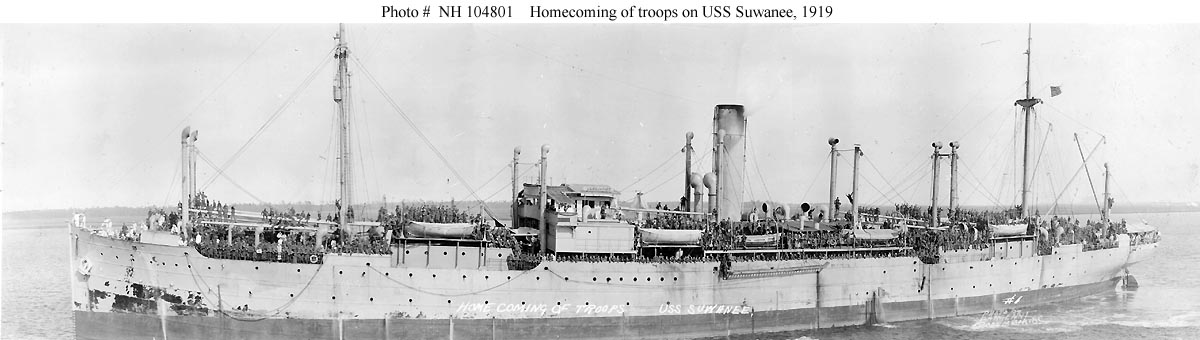
USS Suwanee arrives in the southern United States, possibly at Charleston, South Carolina, in 1919 with her deck crowded with servicemen returning from Europe after World War I.

The U.S. Navy acquired Suwanee on 11 April 1919 for post-war use as a troop transport. She was assigned the Naval Registry Identification Number (Id. No.) 1320 and commissioned the same day as USS Suwanee.

Assigned to the Transport Force, Newport News Division, Suwanee made at least two Atlantic crossings. One documented crossing departed from Newport News, Virginia with a cargo of 795 animals (horses & mules) under the charge of Lieutenant Ervin A. Froshaug, Veterinary Reserve Corps., and 85 enlisted sailors under the command of Captain J.M. Dickinson, F.A.N.G., 149th Field Artillery on March 5, 1918. The ship stopped in New York on March 6, 1918 and joined a convoy of 25 ships crossing the Atlantic arriving in Saint-Nazarie, France on March 25, 1918. And a second crossing to carry American servicemen home to the United States after their World War I service in Europe.

Suwanee was decommissioned on 4 October 1919 and returned to the Shipping Board the same day for disposal. Once again SS Suwanee, she returned to commercial service. Her named later was changed to SS Poznan of the Polish American Navigation and 1922 to Paul Luckenbach when R. Luckenbach Steamship bought her. In 1942 she was sunk in the Arabian Sea by a Japanese submarine.
