= Tehuacana, Texas =

Town in Texas, United States

- Town
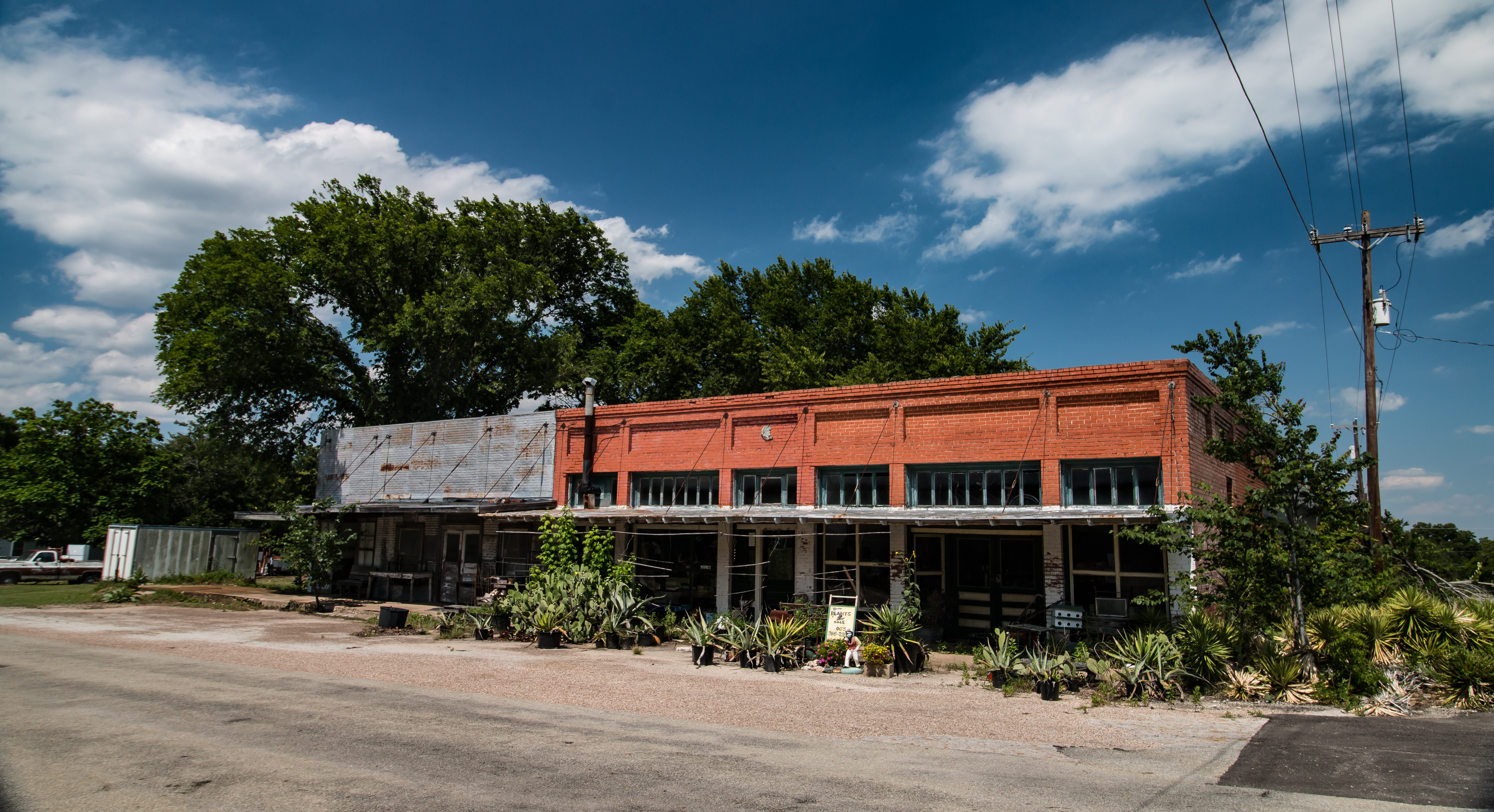

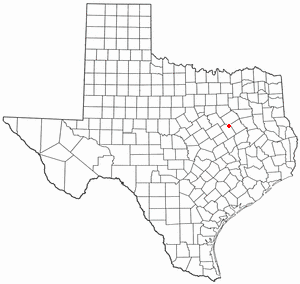
- Location of Tehuacana, Texas

- Coordinates: 31°44′32″N 96°32′44″W
- Country: United States
- State: Texas
- County: Limestone
- Named for: The Tehuacana people

Area
  - Total: 1.59 sq mi (4.11 km^{2})
  - Land: 1.58 sq mi (4.09 km^{2})
  - Water: 0.0077 sq mi (0.02 km^{2})
- Elevation: 640 ft (195 m)

Population (2020)
  - Total: 228
  - Density: 144/sq mi (55.7/km^{2})
- Time zone: UTC-6 (Central (CST))
  - Summer (DST): UTC-5 (CDT)
- ZIP code: 76686
- Area code: 254
- FIPS code: 48-72080
- GNIS feature ID: 1376406
- Website: www.tehuacana.com

Tehuacana (/təˈwɑːkənə/, Spanish pronunciation: [tewaˈkana]) is a town near the Tehuacana Hills in Limestone County, Texas, United States. The population was 228 at the 2020 census. From 1869 until 1902, the town was home to Trinity University.

== History ==
A post office called "Tewockony Springs" was established in what is now known as Tehuacana in 1847. It was named for the Tawakoni Indians, who lived in the area until the late 1840s. In 1850, the town came in second in an election held to decide the new Texas state capitol, which Austin ultimately won. When Tehuacana Academy opened in 1852, the community was known as Tehuacana Hills, though the post office continued to be called after the springs. The post office was discontinued during the Civil War, but service resumed in 1869, at which time the name of the office was changed to Tehuacana.

== Geography ==
Tehuacana is located at 31°44′32″N 96°32′44″W (31.742338, –96.545560).

According to the United States Census Bureau, the town has a total area of 1.6 square miles (4.1 km^{2}), all land.

== Demographics ==
Historical population
Census	Pop.	Note	%±
1900	382		—
1910	425		11.3%
1920	614		44.5%
1930	412		−32.9%
1940	408		−1.0%
1950	389		−4.7%
1960	316		−18.8%
1970	285		−9.8%
1980	265		−7.0%
1990	322		21.5%
2000	307		−4.7%
2010	283		−7.8%
2020	228		−19.4%
U.S. Decennial Census; 2020 Census

As of the census of 2000, there were 307 people, 132 households, and 86 families residing in the town. The population density was 190.3 inhabitants per square mile (73.5/km^{2}). There were 147 housing units at an average density of 91.1 per square mile (35.2/km^{2}). The racial makeup of the town was 89.25% White, 7.49% African American, 2.93% from other races, and 0.33% from two or more races. Hispanic or Latino of any race were 2.93% of the population.

There were 132 households, out of which 30.3% had children under the age of 18 living with them, 54.5% were married couples living together, 8.3% had a female householder with no husband present, and 34.1% were non-families. 33.3% of all households were made up of individuals, and 18.2% had someone living alone who was 65 years of age or older. The average household size was 2.33 and the average family size was 2.89.

In the town, the population was spread out, with 23.5% under the age of 18, 10.7% from 18 to 24, 23.5% from 25 to 44, 27.0% from 45 to 64, and 15.3% who were 65 years of age or older. The median age was 42 years. For every 100 females, there were 100.7 males. For every 100 females age 18 and over, there were 92.6 males.

The median income for a household in the town was $35,469, and the median income for a family was $51,250. Males had a median income of $31,250 versus $21,786 for females. The per capita income for the town was $18,965. About 8.5% of families and 10.6% of the population were below the poverty line, including 9.1% of those under the age of eighteen and none of those 65 or over.

== Education ==
Tehuacana is served by the Mexia Independent School District. Mexia High School is that district's comprehensive high school.

== Notable person ==
- Benjamin Franklin Yoakum, railroad executive born near Tehuacana; played a pivotal role in shaping rail transportation in Texas and the Southwest as a whole
