= Mexia, Texas =

Mexia
- City
- Mexia, Texas
- Motto(s): A great place to live, no matter how you pronounce it
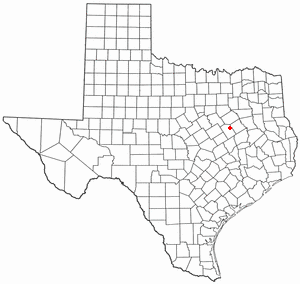
- Location of Mexia, Texas

- Coordinates: 31°39′44″N 96°29′50″W
- Country: United States
- State: Texas
- County: Limestone

Area
  - Total: 7.30 sq mi (18.90 km^{2})
  - Land: 7.20 sq mi (18.64 km^{2})
  - Water: 0.097 sq mi (0.25 km^{2})
- Elevation: 532 ft (162 m)

Population (2025)
  - Total: 7,091
  - Density: 1,020.3/sq mi (393.95/km^{2})
- Time zone: UTC-6 (Central (CST))
  - Summer (DST): UTC-5 (CDT)
- ZIP code: 76667
- Area code: 254
- FIPS code: 48-47916
- GNIS feature ID: 2411092
- Website: cityofmexia.com

Mexia (/məxeɪjə/ muh-HAY-uh or /mɛxeɪjə/ meh-HAY-uh) is a city in Limestone County, Texas, United States. The population was 7,091 at the 2025 census.

The city's motto, based on the fact that outsiders tend to mispronounce the name as /ˈmɛksiə/ (MEK-see-ə), is "A great place to live, no matter how you pronounce it."

Named after General José Antonio Mexía, a Mexican hero for the Republic of Texas Army during the Texas Revolution, the town was founded near his estate. Nearby attractions include Fort Parker Historical recreation, the Confederate Reunion grounds, and Mexia State Supported Living Center (formerly Mexia State School), which began as a prisoner of war camp for members of Field Marshal Erwin Rommel's Afrika Korps during World War II.

Mexia is also home to the Mexia Public Schools Museum, one of a few museums dedicated to the historical and social significance of a Texas public school system.

Late model Anna Nicole Smith attended Mexia Public Schools.

Mexia hosts a large Juneteenth celebration every year.

== Geography ==
According to the United States Census Bureau, the city has a total area of 5.2 square miles (13 km^{2}), all land.

== Demographics ==
Historical population
Census	Pop.	Note	%±
1890	1,674		—
1900	2,393		43.0%
1910	2,694		12.6%
1920	3,482		29.3%
1930	6,579		88.9%
1940	6,410		−2.6%
1950	6,627		3.4%
1960	6,121		−7.6%
1970	5,943		−2.9%
1980	7,094		19.4%
1990	6,933		−2.3%
2000	6,563		−5.3%
2010	7,459		13.7%
2020	6,893		−7.6%
U.S. Decennial Census

=== Racial and ethnic composition ===
Mexia city, Texas – Racial and ethnic composition Note: the US Census treats Hispanic/Latino as an ethnic category. This table excludes Latinos from the racial categories and assigns them to a separate category. Hispanics/Latinos may be of any race.
Race / Ethnicity (NH = Non-Hispanic)	Pop 2000	Pop 2010	Pop 2020	% 2000	% 2010	% 2020
White alone (NH)	3,265	2,904	2,213	49.75%	38.93%	32.11%
Black or African American alone (NH)	2,073	2,337	2,086	31.59%	31.33%	30.26%
Native American or Alaska Native alone (NH)	8	11	19	0.12%	0.15%	0.28%
Asian alone (NH)	7	41	33	0.11%	0.55%	0.48%
Native Hawaiian or Pacific Islander alone (NH)	0	0	8	0.00%	0.00%	0.12%
Other race alone (NH)	0	2	10	0.00%	0.03%	0.15%
Mixed race or Multiracial (NH)	35	79	178	0.53%	1.06%	2.58%
Hispanic or Latino (any race)	1,175	2,085	2,346	17.90%	27.95%	34.03%
Total	6,563	7,459	6,893	100.00%	100.00%	100.00%

=== 2020 census ===
As of the 2020 census, Mexia had a population of 6,893, 2,415 households, and 1,586 families residing in the city. The median age was 35.7 years, 26.7% of residents were under the age of 18 and 15.3% of residents were 65 years of age or older. For every 100 females there were 96.4 males, and for every 100 females age 18 and over there were 92.8 males age 18 and over.

Of the 2,415 households, 35.7% had children under the age of 18 living in them. Of all households, 39.7% were married-couple households, 18.6% were households with a male householder and no spouse or partner present, and 35.4% were households with a female householder and no spouse or partner present. About 27.3% of all households were made up of individuals and 11.2% had someone living alone who was 65 years of age or older.

There were 2,794 housing units, of which 13.6% were vacant. The homeowner vacancy rate was 2.3% and the rental vacancy rate was 9.3%.

96.6% of residents lived in urban areas, while 3.4% lived in rural areas.

Racial composition as of the 2020 census
Race	Number	Percent
White	2,945	42.7%
Black or African American	2,134	31.0%
American Indian and Alaska Native	45	0.7%
Asian	33	0.5%
Native Hawaiian and Other Pacific Islander	8	0.1%
Some other race	1,083	15.7%
Two or more races	645	9.4%

=== 2008 estimate ===
A 2008 Census Bureau estimate recorded a median income for a household in the city of $22,785 and a median income for a family of $29,375, with males having a median income of $26,479 versus $18,138 for females. The per capita income for the city was $12,235, and about 20.8% of families and 22.1% of the population were below the poverty line, including 28.5% of those under age 18 and 15.2% of those age 65 or over.

== History ==
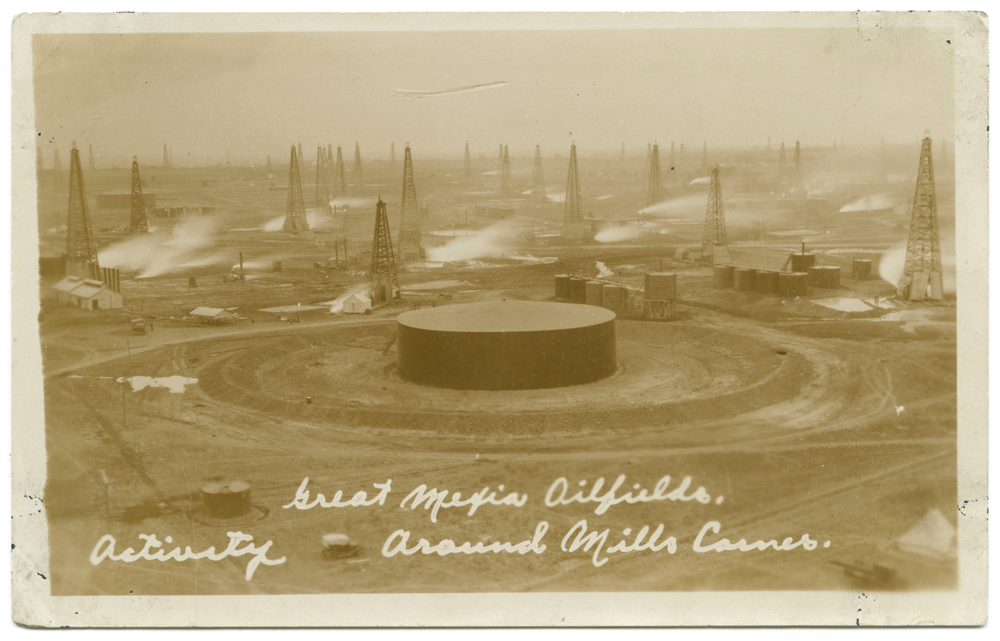
Mexia Oilfields 1920s.

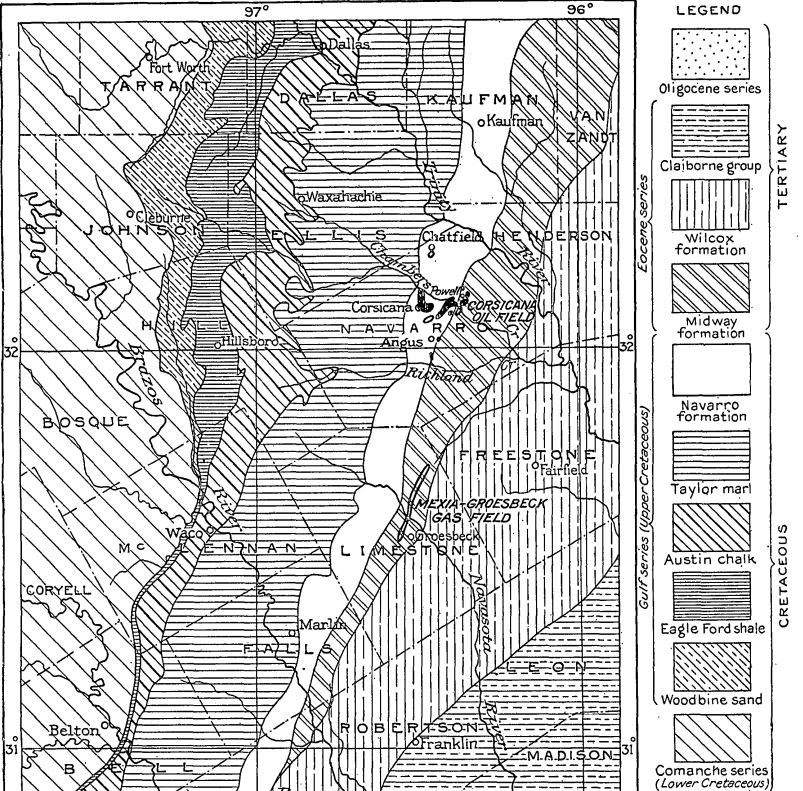
Mexia-Groesbeck gas oil field geological map

Mexia was founded as a town in the 19th century. Inhabitants occupied the Fort Parker settlement near the Navasota river. The area is near where the rolling hills of the great plains begin. The hills provided grazing land for the buffalo herds, which plains Indians depended upon for sustenance. Many hunting artifacts from Native American people have been found in the creek beds and draws around Mexia. The Comanche tribe came into conflict with the white settlers in this area. The abduction of Cynthia Ann Parker took place at Fort Parker. Comanches raided the fort and took the nine-year-old Parker girl. She lived among the Comanche people into adulthood and was the mother of Quanah Parker, the last Comanche war chief.

Mexia is at the intersection of US Highway 84 and State highways 14 and 171, twelve miles northeast of Groesbeck in northeastern Limestone County. It was named for the Mexía family, who in 1833 received an eleven-league land grant that included what is now the townsite. The town was laid out in 1870 by a trustee of the Houston and Texas Central Townsite Company, which offered lots for sale in 1871, as the Houston and Texas Central Railway was completed between Hearne and Groesbeck. The Mexia post office began operation in 1872, and the community was incorporated with a mayoral form of government in 1873 by an act of the legislature. J.C. Yarbro was the first mayor. The city's first newspaper, the Ledger, was established in Fairfield in 1869 and moved to Mexia in 1872. By 1880 Mexia also had four schools, three churches, and a variety of businesses to serve its 1,800 residents; by 1885 the town had a gas works, an opera house, two banks, two sawmills, and 2,000 residents. The Mexia Democrat was established in 1887 and the Weekly News in 1898. Between 1904 and 1906 the Trinity and Brazos Valley Railway built track between Hillsboro and Houston, making Mexia a commercial crossroads for area farmers.

In 1912 the Mexia Gas and Oil Company drilled ten dry holes, but in the eleventh attempt discovered a large natural gas deposit. The Mexia oilfield was discovered in 1920, by Colonel Albert E. Humphreys and his geologist F. Julius Fohs. Oil production peaked in November 1921 at 53,000 BOPD. The population of Mexia increased from 3,482 to nearly 35,000. The rapid growth was excessive for local authorities, and for a short time in 1922 Mexia was under martial law. That year, production for the Mexia field was 35 million barrels produced. Cumulative production of the field totaled 108 million barrels by the mid-1980s. In 1924 Mexia residents passed a new city charter that changed the local government to a city manager system. After the initial oil boom, the population of Mexia declined to 10,000 by the mid-1920s. The prosperity generated by the boom continued until the 1930s, when the Great Depression forced many people to leave in search of work. The number of residents stabilized at 6,500 in the early 1930s, but the number of businesses fell from 280 to 190. In 1942 a camp for prisoners of war was established at Mexia; the facility was converted in 1947 for use as the Mexia State School, which became one of the community's principal employers. The population was reported as 6,618 in the early 1950s, 5,943 in the early 1970s, 7,172 in the late 1980s, and 6,933 in 1990. In 2000 the population was listed as 6,563.

Mexia made national news in 1981, when three young black men drowned in Lake Mexia after being taken into custody by law enforcement officers for possession of marijuana during the annual Juneteenth celebration. Carl Baker, 19; Anthony Freeman, 18; and Steven Booker, 19; drowned after a boat used to transport them across the lake, which was also occupied by three officers, capsized less than 100 feet from shore. Two police officers and one probation officer who had been in the boat were tried for the offense of criminally negligent homicide, but all were acquitted by a jury in Dallas.

Mexia also made news when its former resident Anna Nicole Smith died, and when Allen Stanford was arrested on allegations of fraud in 2009.

The city of Mexia, the confusion over its correct pronunciation and the city motto are all the subject of an Act 1 Aria in Mark-Anthony Turnage's Opera Anna Nicole staged by the Royal Opera House, Covent Garden, London. Various imagined residents such as the Town Mayor and head of the Chamber of Commerce also feature alongside the titular character.

== Education ==
Mexia is zoned to schools in the Mexia Independent School District.

Schools include:

- A.B. McBay Elementary School
- R.Q. Sims Intermediate School
- Mexia Junior High School
- Mexia High School

Pre-integration:

- Woodland High School (African-American)
- Paul Lawrence Dunbar High School (African-American)

Post-Secondary Education:

- Navarro College's Mexia Campus

== Notable people ==
- Les Baxter, musician and composer
- Kelvin Beachum, NFL offensive lineman
- Quentin Durward Corley, judge
- Bill Crider, novelist
- W. C. Friley, clergyman and educator
- Henry Cecil McBay, chemist
- Ynés Mexía, botanist
- Washington Phillips, singer
- Ray Rhodes, NFL player and coach
- Anna Nicole Smith, model and actress
- Daniel Wayne Smith, son of Anna Nicole Smith
- Allen Stanford, financier, convicted felon
- Lee Wilder Thomas, oilman
- Cindy Walker, songwriter and singer

== Climate ==
The climate in this area is characterized by hot, humid summers and generally mild to cool winters. According to the Köppen Climate Classification system, Mexia has a humid subtropical climate, abbreviated "Cfa" on climate maps.

== See also ==
- List of cities in Texas
