= Benjamin Franklin Yoakum =

American railroad executive (1859–1929)

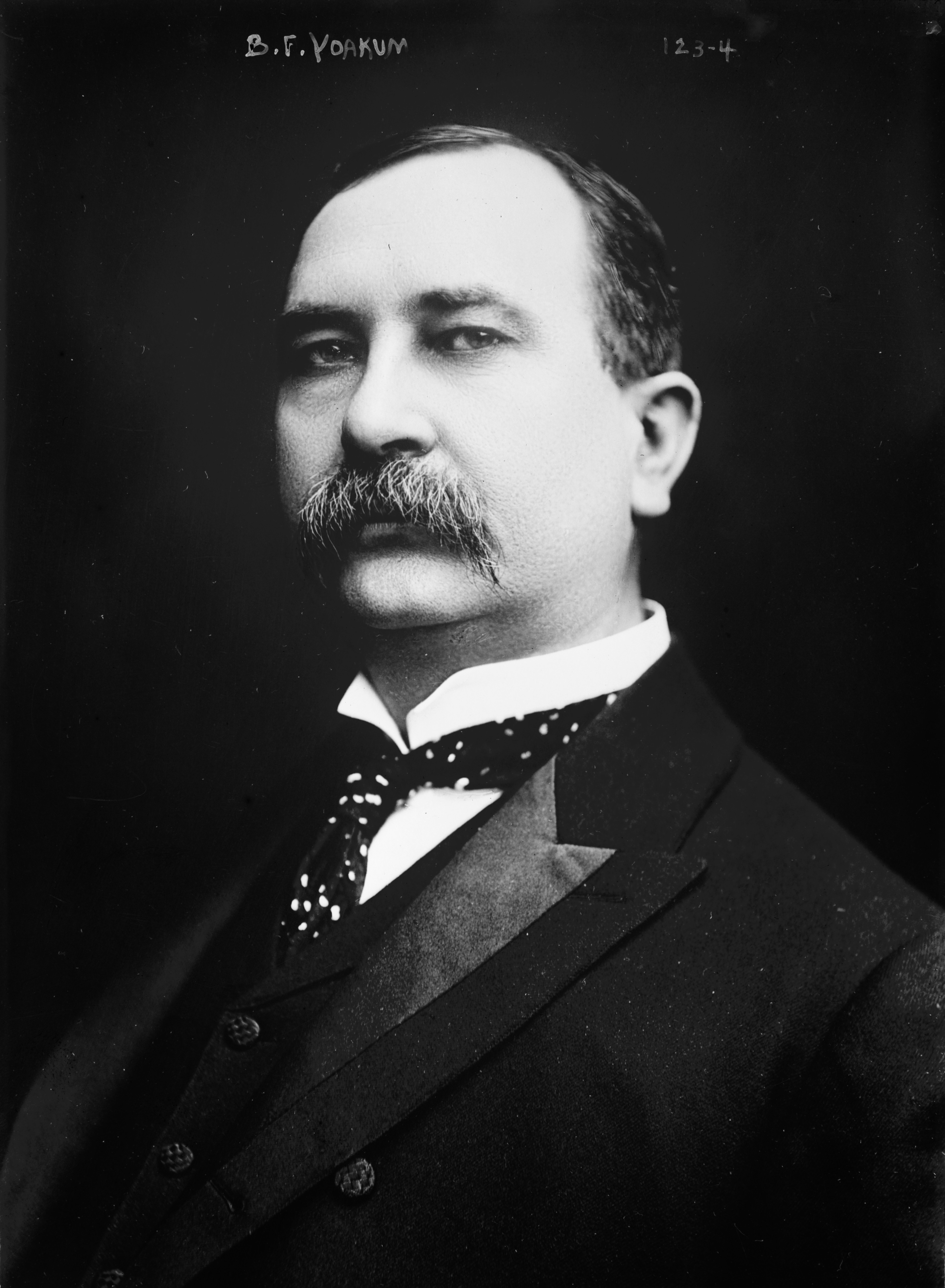
- B. F. Yoakum, circa 1900
- Born: August 20, 1859; Tehuacana, Texas
- Died: November 28, 1929 (aged 70); New York, New York
- Occupation: Railroad executive
- Spouse: Elizabeth Bennett
- Children: 2

Benjamin Franklin Yoakum (August 20, 1859 – November 28, 1929) was an American railroad executive of the late 19th and early 20th centuries who attempted to join the Frisco and Rock Island Railroads into a great system stretching from Chicago to Mexico. In 1909, when Yoakum controlled 17,500 miles of railroad, Railway World magazine called him an "empire builder" who had done as much for the Southwest as James J. Hill had done for the Northwest.

== Biography ==
Yoakum was born near Tehuacana, Texas, on August 20, 1859 to Narcissa Teague and Franklin L. Yoakum.

In 1879 at age twenty, he worked on the surveying gang for the International-Great Northern Railroad to Palestine, Texas. He later became a land speculator for Jay Gould. He drilled artesian wells in the Rio Grande Valley. In 1887, the town of Yoakum, Texas, was named for him.

From before 1888 to 1892, Yoakum worked for the San Antonio and Aransas Pass Railway as general manager and traffic manager. From 1893 to 1896, he was general manager and third vice president for the Gulf, Colorado and Santa Fe Railroad. In 1896, he became vice president and general manager of the Frisco Railroad. He became president in 1900, and chairman of the board in 1904.

Other positions Yoakum held were president of the Chicago and Eastern Illinois Railroad, 1902-1904, afterwards chairman of the board; president, Evansville and Terre Haute Railroad, 1904, afterwards chairman; president, St. Louis, Brownsville and Mexico Railway after 1905; and chairman of the executive committee, Chicago, Rock Island and Pacific Railroad after 1905.

According to the Handbook of Texas,

In 1905 the Frisco and Rock Island lines were joined, and Yoakum was the chairman of the executive committee. This line was known as the Yoakum Line and at the time was the largest railroad system under a single control. His career was one of the most colorful of the many men in railroad history.

Between 1911 and 1913, the Frisco suffered devastating financial losses from coal strikes, flooding of the tracks in Louisiana and Arkansas, and loss of business due to the Mexican Revolution. "Yoakum's Dream" ended when the Frisco entered bankruptcy in 1913 and was shorn of its Gulf Coast Lines as well as its affiliation with the Rock Island.

In 1907, Yoakum moved to New York, where he became president of the Empire Bond and Mortgage Company. In his later years, Yoakum gave lectures and wrote popular magazine articles about the railroads, and advocated agricultural cooperatives to help farmers, in whose problems he was deeply interested.

Yoakum died at his home in New York on November 28, 1929, at age 70. He was buried in Woodlawn Cemetery in New York City.

In 1932, Yoakum's heirs sold his country home, "Tywacana", located in what was then part of Farmingdale, New York, now within the Census boundaries of Old Bethpage on Long Island, to the State of New York, which developed the property into Bethpage State Park. The park's famous Black Course has hosted golf's U.S. Open twice.

== Family ==
Yoakum married Elizabeth Bennett of San Antonio, daughter of a prominent banker. They had two daughters, one of whom, Bessie F. Yoakum, married Francis Rham Larkin in 1913.

A brother, Charles Henderson Yoakum (1849-1909), was a Texas state legislator and United States Congressman. Another brother, Finis E. Yoakum (1851-1920), was a faith healer and social reformer.

== See also ==
- Gulf Coast Lines
