= List of municipalities in Texas =

A map of the United States of America with the state of Texas highlighted

Texas is a state located in the Southern United States. As of the 2025 census estimate, Texas has 31,709,821 residents, of which over 68% (21,815,869) reside in the Dallas–Fort Worth metroplex, Houston metropolitan area, San Antonio metropolitan area, and Austin metropolitan area.

== Municipalities ==
Texas Counties and cities

As of May 2026, the 1,224 Texas municipalities (Note: Ellinger was incorporated in November 2020 after the 2020 Census count ended.) include 971 cities, 230 towns, and 23 villages. These designations are determined by United States Census Bureau requirements based on state statutes and may not match a municipality's self-reported designation. The types of municipalities in Texas are defined in the Local Government Code, which was codified in 1987. The designations of city, town and village were superseded by Type A, B, and C general-law cities in the code.

In Texas, there are two forms of municipal government: general-law and home-rule. A general-law municipality has no charter and is limited to the specific powers granted by the general laws of the state. Home-rule municipalities have a charter and derive the "full power of local self-government" from the Constitution of Texas. A general-law municipality containing more than 5,000 inhabitants may order an election on adopting a home-rule charter. If the population of the municipality later falls below 5,000, it may maintain its home-rule charter.

Three pairs of municipalities share the same name: Lakeside, Oak Ridge, and Reno.

County seat
State capital and county seat

2025 rank	Municipality	Designation	Primary county	Secondary county(ies)	Population		
2025 rank	Municipality	Designation	Primary county	Secondary county(ies)	2025 Estimate	2020 census	2020–2025 Change
1	Houston	City	Harris	Fort Bend, Montgomery, Waller	2,397,315	2,301,572	+4.16%
2	San Antonio	City	Bexar	Medina	1,548,422	1,434,625	+7.93%
3	Dallas	City	Dallas	Rockwall, Collin, Kaufman, Denton	1,329,491	1,304,379	+1.93%
4	Fort Worth	City	Tarrant	Denton, Parker, Wise, Johnson	1,028,117	918,915	+11.88%
5	Austin	City	Travis	Williamson, Hays	1,002,632	961,855	+4.24%
6	El Paso	City	El Paso	—	683,012	678,815	+0.62%
7	Arlington	City	Tarrant	—	402,134	394,266	+2.00%
8	Corpus Christi	City	Nueces	Kleberg, Aransas, San Patricio	317,247	317,863	−0.19%
9	Plano	City	Collin	Denton	293,028	285,494	+2.64%
10	Lubbock	City	Lubbock	—	273,071	257,141	+6.20%
11	Laredo	City	Webb	—	269,515	255,205	+5.61%
12	Irving	City	Dallas	—	257,076	256,684	+0.15%
13	Garland	City	Dallas	Rockwall	249,625	246,018	+1.47%
14	Frisco	City	Collin	Denton	236,955	200,509	+18.18%
15	McKinney	City	Collin	—	236,001	195,308	+20.84%
16	Grand Prairie	City	Dallas	Tarrant, Ellis	209,434	196,100	+6.80%
17	Amarillo	City	Potter	Randall	205,130	200,393	+2.36%
18	Brownsville	City	Cameron	—	192,957	186,738	+3.33%
19	Denton	City	Denton	—	169,431	139,869	+21.14%
20	Killeen	City	Bell	—	161,883	153,095	+5.74%
21	Mesquite	City	Dallas	Kaufman	150,693	150,108	+0.39%
22	McAllen	City	Hidalgo	—	150,640	142,210	+5.93%
23	Pasadena	City	Harris	—	148,539	151,950	−2.24%
24	Waco	City	McLennan	—	147,788	138,486	+6.72%
25	Midland	City	Midland	Martin	147,615	132,524	+11.39%
26	Round Rock	City	Williamson	Travis	141,282	119,468	+18.26%
27	Lewisville	City	Denton	Dallas	139,006	111,822	+24.31%
28	Carrollton	City	Dallas	Denton, Collin	134,562	133,434	+0.85%
29	Abilene	City	Taylor	Jones	131,588	125,182	+5.12%
30	Pearland	City	Brazoria	Harris, Fort Bend	129,930	125,828	+3.26%
31	College Station	City	Brazos	—	127,472	120,511	+5.78%
32	Odessa	City	Ector	Midland	122,707	114,428	+7.24%
33	New Braunfels	City	Comal	Guadalupe	122,492	90,403	+35.50%
34	League City	City	Galveston	Harris	119,905	114,392	+4.82%
35	Conroe	City	Montgomery	—	119,564	89,956	+32.91%
36	Richardson	City	Dallas	Collin	118,542	119,469	−0.78%
37	Tyler	City	Smith	—	113,723	105,995	+7.29%
38	Allen	City	Collin	—	113,447	104,627	+8.43%
39	Beaumont	City	Jefferson	—	112,967	115,282	−2.01%
40	Edinburg	City	Hidalgo	—	110,700	100,243	+10.43%
41	Sugar Land	City	Fort Bend	—	107,726	111,026	−2.97%
42	Georgetown	City	Williamson	—	106,907	67,176	+59.14%
43	Wichita Falls	City	Wichita	—	101,951	102,316	−0.36%
44	San Angelo	City	Tom Green	—	100,640	99,893	+0.75%
45	Temple	City	Bell	—	98,412	82,073	+19.91%
46	Bryan	City	Brazos	—	91,996	83,980	+9.55%
47	Leander	City	Williamson	Travis	91,132	59,202	+53.93%
48	Mission	City	Hidalgo	—	88,992	85,778	+3.75%
49	Baytown	City	Harris	Chambers	86,561	83,701	+3.42%
50	Mansfield	City	Tarrant	Johnson, Ellis	84,444	72,602	+16.31%
51	Longview	City	Gregg	Harrison	83,236	81,638	+1.96%
52	Pharr	City	Hidalgo	—	80,830	79,715	+1.40%
53	Flower Mound	Town	Denton	Tarrant	79,540	75,956	+4.72%
54	Cedar Park	City	Williamson	Travis	79,032	77,595	+1.85%
55	San Marcos	City	Hays	Caldwell, Guadalupe	77,830	67,553	+15.21%
56	Missouri City	City	Fort Bend	Harris	77,327	74,259	+4.13%
57	Harlingen	City	Cameron	—	72,467	71,829	+0.89%
58	North Richland Hills	City	Tarrant	—	70,843	69,917	+1.32%
59	Kyle	City	Hays	—	69,917	45,697	+53.00%
60	Pflugerville	City	Travis	Williamson	68,316	65,191	+4.79%
61	Rowlett	City	Dallas	Rockwall	67,890	62,535	+8.56%
62	Victoria	City	Victoria	—	66,500	65,534	+1.47%
63	Fulshear	City	Fort Bend	—	64,630	16,856	+283.42%
64	Celina	City	Collin	Denton	64,427	16,739	+284.89%
65	Wylie	City	Collin	Dallas, Rockwall	63,842	57,526	+10.98%
66	Little Elm	City	Denton	—	62,727	46,453	+35.03%
67	Euless	City	Tarrant	—	60,008	61,032	−1.68%
68	Texas City	City	Galveston	Chambers	59,733	51,898	+15.10%
69	Burleson	City	Johnson	Tarrant	56,907	47,641	+19.45%
70	DeSoto	City	Dallas	—	56,681	56,145	+0.95%
71	Port Arthur	City	Jefferson	Orange	55,804	56,039	−0.42%
72	Rockwall	City	Rockwall	—	53,980	47,251	+14.24%
73	Galveston	City	Galveston	—	53,636	53,695	−0.11%
74	Sherman	City	Grayson	—	52,417	43,645	+20.10%
75	Grapevine	City	Tarrant	Dallas, Denton	50,714	50,631	+0.16%
76	Waxahachie	City	Ellis	—	50,090	41,140	+21.75%
77	Cedar Hill	City	Dallas	Ellis	49,801	49,148	+1.33%
78	Huntsville	City	Walker	—	49,088	45,941	+6.85%
79	Bedford	City	Tarrant	—	47,958	49,928	−3.95%
80	Midlothian	City	Ellis	—	46,683	35,125	+32.91%
81	The Colony	City	Denton	—	46,196	44,534	+3.73%
82	Keller	City	Tarrant	—	46,078	45,776	+0.66%
83	Hutto	City	Williamson	—	46,048	27,577	+66.98%
84	Schertz	City	Bexar	Guadalupe, Comal	45,978	42,002	+9.47%
85	Prosper	Town	Collin	Denton	45,605	30,174	+51.14%
86	Haltom City	City	Tarrant	—	45,542	46,073	−1.15%
87	Weslaco	City	Hidalgo	—	44,203	40,160	+10.07%
88	Princeton	City	Collin	—	43,524	17,027	+155.62%
89	Rosenberg	City	Fort Bend	—	42,701	38,282	+11.54%
90	Forney	City	Kaufman	—	41,658	23,455	+77.61%
91	Coppell	City	Dallas	Denton	41,386	42,983	−3.72%
92	Friendswood	City	Galveston	Harris	41,319	41,213	+0.26%
93	Seguin	City	Guadalupe	—	41,048	29,433	+39.46%
94	Weatherford	City	Parker	—	40,634	30,854	+31.70%
95	Lancaster	City	Dallas	—	40,526	41,275	−1.81%
96	Copperas Cove	City	Coryell	Lampasas, Bell	40,118	36,670	+9.40%
97	Cleburne	City	Johnson	—	39,942	31,352	+27.40%
98	Cibolo	City	Guadalupe	Bexar	39,019	32,276	+20.89%
99	Hurst	City	Tarrant	—	38,974	40,413	−3.56%
100	Duncanville	City	Dallas	—	38,915	40,706	−4.40%
101	Socorro	City	El Paso	—	38,787	34,306	+13.06%
102	Farmers Branch	City	Dallas	—	38,320	35,991	+6.47%
103	La Porte	City	Harris	—	37,983	35,124	+8.14%
104	San Juan	City	Hidalgo	—	37,868	35,294	+7.29%
105	Greenville	City	Hunt	—	37,069	28,164	+31.62%
106	Texarkana	City	Bowie	—	36,195	36,193	+0.01%
107	Anna	City	Collin	—	35,245	16,896	+108.60%
108	Harker Heights	City	Bell	—	35,195	33,097	+6.34%
109	Del Rio	City	Val Verde	—	34,496	34,673	−0.51%
110	Lufkin	City	Angelina	—	34,350	34,143	+0.61%
111	Deer Park	City	Harris	—	34,282	34,495	−0.62%
112	Sachse	City	Dallas	Collin	32,834	27,103	+21.15%
113	Nacogdoches	City	Nacogdoches	—	32,500	32,147	+1.10%
114	Converse	City	Bexar	—	32,481	27,466	+18.26%
115	Southlake	City	Tarrant	Denton	31,175	31,265	−0.29%
116	Alvin	City	Brazoria	—	30,115	27,098	+11.13%
117	Melissa	City	Collin	—	29,969	13,901	+115.59%
118	Fate	City	Rockwall	—	29,007	17,958	+61.53%
119	Eagle Pass	City	Maverick	—	28,926	28,130	+2.83%
120	Katy	City	Harris	Fort Bend, Waller	28,373	21,894	+29.59%
121	Royse City	City	Rockwall	Collin, Hunt	28,307	13,508	+109.56%
122	Lake Jackson	City	Brazoria	—	27,803	28,177	−1.33%
123	Balch Springs	City	Dallas	—	27,258	27,685	−1.54%
124	Denison	City	Grayson	—	26,822	24,479	+9.57%
125	Saginaw	City	Tarrant	—	26,706	23,890	+11.79%
126	Belton	City	Bell	—	25,964	23,054	+12.62%
127	Colleyville	City	Tarrant	—	25,727	26,057	−1.27%
128	Ennis	City	Ellis	—	25,694	20,159	+27.46%
129	Kerrville	City	Kerr	—	25,578	24,278	+5.35%
130	Corsicana	City	Navarro	—	25,487	25,109	+1.51%
131	University Park	City	Dallas	—	25,323	25,278	+0.18%
132	Corinth	City	Denton	—	25,297	22,634	+11.77%
133	Paris	City	Lamar	—	25,205	24,476	+2.98%
134	Horizon City	City	El Paso	—	25,118	22,489	+11.69%
135	San Benito	City	Cameron	—	24,980	24,861	+0.48%
136	Kingsville	City	Kleberg	—	24,687	25,402	−2.81%
137	Marshall	City	Harrison	—	24,467	23,392	+4.60%
138	Benbrook	City	Tarrant	—	24,279	24,520	−0.98%
139	Alton	City	Hidalgo	—	24,138	18,198	+32.64%
140	Boerne	City	Kendall	—	24,047	17,850	+34.72%
141	Terrell	City	Kaufman	—	23,921	17,465	+36.97%
142	Manor	City	Travis	—	23,070	13,652	+68.99%
143	Watauga	City	Tarrant	—	22,981	23,650	−2.83%
144	Big Spring	City	Howard	—	22,290	26,144	−14.74%
145	Dickinson	City	Galveston	—	21,908	20,847	+5.09%
146	Stephenville	City	Erath	—	21,793	20,897	+4.29%
147	Angleton	City	Brazoria	—	21,295	19,429	+9.60%
148	Seagoville	City	Dallas	Kaufman	21,077	18,446	+14.26%
149	Murphy	City	Collin	—	20,985	21,013	−0.13%
150	Crowley	City	Tarrant	Johnson	20,954	18,070	+15.96%
151	Portland	City	San Patricio	Nueces	20,833	20,383	+2.21%
152	Manvel	City	Brazoria	—	20,699	9,992	+107.16%
153	Alamo	City	Hidalgo	—	20,625	19,493	+5.81%
154	Iowa Colony	Village	Brazoria	—	20,503	8,154	+151.45%
155	Universal City	City	Bexar	Guadalupe	20,399	19,720	+3.44%
156	Red Oak	City	Ellis	—	20,394	14,222	+43.40%
157	Glenn Heights	City	Dallas	Ellis	20,327	15,819	+28.50%
158	La Marque	City	Galveston	—	20,324	18,030	+12.72%
159	Brenham	City	Washington	—	19,957	17,369	+14.90%
160	Palestine	City	Anderson	—	19,555	18,544	+5.45%
161	Orange	City	Orange	—	19,419	19,324	+0.49%
162	Plainview	City	Hale	—	19,314	20,187	−4.32%
163	Lakeway	City	Travis	—	19,027	19,189	−0.84%
164	Brownwood	City	Brown	—	18,635	18,862	−1.20%
165	Gainesville	City	Cooke	—	18,528	17,394	+6.52%
166	Taylor	City	Williamson	—	18,402	16,267	+13.12%
167	Lockhart	City	Caldwell	—	18,159	14,379	+26.29%
168	Nederland	City	Jefferson	—	18,108	18,856	−3.97%
169	Stafford	City	Fort Bend	Harris	18,043	17,666	+2.13%
170	White Settlement	City	Tarrant	—	17,932	18,269	−1.84%
171	Mercedes	City	Hidalgo	—	17,915	16,258	+10.19%
172	Alice	City	Jim Wells	—	17,550	17,891	−1.91%
173	Bay City	City	Matagorda	—	17,488	18,061	−3.17%
174	Bellaire	City	Harris	—	17,434	17,202	+1.35%
175	Addison	Town	Dallas	—	17,195	16,661	+3.21%
176	Sulphur Springs	City	Hopkins	—	17,054	15,941	+6.98%
177	Groves	City	Jefferson	—	16,907	17,335	−2.47%
178	Hewitt	City	McLennan	—	16,754	16,026	+4.54%
179	Donna	City	Hidalgo	—	16,698	16,797	−0.59%
180	Canyon	City	Randall	—	16,518	14,836	+11.34%
181	Humble	City	Harris	—	16,484	16,795	−1.85%
182	Live Oak	City	Bexar	—	16,426	15,781	+4.09%
183	Gatesville	City	Coryell	—	16,422	16,135	+1.78%
184	Pampa	City	Gray	—	16,414	16,867	−2.69%
185	South Houston	City	Harris	—	16,407	16,153	+1.57%
186	Mount Pleasant	City	Titus	—	16,225	16,047	+1.11%
187	Buda	City	Hays	—	16,166	15,108	+7.00%
188	Highland Village	City	Denton	—	16,029	15,899	+0.82%
189	Mineral Wells	City	Palo Pinto	Parker	15,983	14,820	+7.85%
190	Palmview	City	Hidalgo	—	15,878	15,830	+0.30%
191	Tomball	City	Harris	—	15,768	12,341	+27.77%
192	Uvalde	City	Uvalde	—	15,455	15,217	+1.56%
193	Rio Grande City	City	Starr	—	15,451	15,317	+0.87%
194	Hidalgo	City	Hidalgo	—	15,376	13,964	+10.11%
195	Azle	City	Tarrant	Parker	15,365	13,369	+14.93%
196	West University Place	City	Harris	—	15,158	14,955	+1.36%
197	Hereford	City	Deaf Smith	—	14,976	14,972	+0.03%
198	Dumas	City	Moore	—	14,862	14,501	+2.49%
199	Jacksonville	City	Cherokee	—	14,658	13,997	+4.72%
200	Lumberton	City	Hardin	—	14,123	13,554	+4.20%
201	Forest Hill	City	Tarrant	—	14,056	13,955	+0.72%
202	Seabrook	City	Chambers	Harris, Galveston	13,974	13,618	+2.61%
203	Santa Fe	City	Galveston	—	13,913	12,735	+9.25%
204	Athens	City	Henderson	—	13,870	12,857	+7.88%
205	Port Neches	City	Jefferson	—	13,768	13,692	+0.56%
206	Trophy Club	Town	Denton	Tarrant	13,695	13,688	+0.05%
207	Andrews	City	Andrews	—	13,665	13,487	+1.32%
208	Kilgore	City	Gregg	Rusk	13,531	13,376	+1.16%
209	Henderson	City	Rusk	—	13,496	13,271	+1.70%
210	Richmond	City	Fort Bend	—	13,389	11,627	+15.15%
211	Bastrop	City	Bastrop	—	13,383	9,688	+38.14%
212	Elgin	City	Bastrop	Travis	13,327	9,784	+36.21%
213	Liberty Hill	City	Williamson	—	13,317	3,646	+265.25%
214	Granbury	City	Hood	—	13,263	10,958	+21.03%
215	Beeville	City	Bee	—	13,086	13,669	−4.27%
216	Robinson	City	McLennan	—	13,028	12,443	+4.70%
217	Levelland	City	Hockley	—	12,513	12,652	−1.10%
218	Webster	City	Harris	—	12,507	12,499	+0.06%
219	Providence Village	Town	Denton	—	12,498	7,691	+62.50%
220	El Campo	City	Wharton	—	12,142	12,350	−1.68%
221	Northlake	Town	Denton	—	12,036	5,201	+131.42%
222	Fair Oaks Ranch	City	Bexar	Kendall, Comal	12,025	9,833	+22.29%
223	Selma	City	Bexar	Guadalupe, Comal	11,955	10,952	+9.16%
224	Fredericksburg	City	Gillespie	—	11,893	10,875	+9.36%
225	Lavon	City	Collin	—	11,888	4,469	+166.01%
226	Borger	City	Hutchinson	—	11,842	12,551	−5.65%
227	Heath	City	Rockwall	Kaufman	11,671	9,769	+19.47%
228	Leon Valley	City	Bexar	—	11,563	11,542	+0.18%
229	Roma	City	Starr	—	11,543	11,561	−0.16%
230	Pleasanton	City	Atascosa	—	11,511	10,648	+8.10%
231	Rockport	City	Aransas	—	11,348	10,070	+12.69%
232	Bonham	City	Fannin	—	11,263	10,408	+8.21%
233	Dripping Springs	City	Hays	—	11,167	4,650	+140.15%
234	Snyder	City	Scurry	—	11,166	11,438	−2.38%
235	Port Lavaca	City	Calhoun	—	11,060	11,557	−4.30%
236	Burkburnett	City	Wichita	—	11,057	10,939	+1.08%
237	Roanoke	City	Denton	Tarrant	10,931	9,665	+13.10%
238	Fairview	Town	Collin	—	10,913	10,372	+5.22%
239	Clute	City	Brazoria	—	10,821	10,604	+2.05%
240	Kaufman	City	Kaufman	—	10,717	6,797	+57.67%
241	Mont Belvieu	City	Chambers	Liberty	10,673	7,654	+39.44%
242	Kennedale	City	Tarrant	—	10,626	8,517	+24.76%
243	Bellmead	City	McLennan	—	10,592	10,494	+0.93%
244	Freeport	City	Brazoria	—	10,508	10,696	−1.76%
245	Lago Vista	City	Travis	—	10,498	8,896	+18.01%
246	Helotes	City	Bexar	—	10,387	9,030	+15.03%
247	Pecos	City	Reeves	—	10,386	12,916	−19.59%
248	Galena Park	City	Harris	—	10,352	10,740	−3.61%
249	Robstown	City	Nueces	—	10,324	10,143	+1.78%
250	Sanger	City	Denton	Cooke	10,238	8,839	+15.83%
251	Dayton	City	Liberty	—	10,226	8,777	+16.51%
252	Josephine	City	Collin	Hunt	10,208	2,119	+381.74%
253	Sweetwater	City	Nolan	—	10,141	10,622	−4.53%
254	San Elizario	City	El Paso	—	10,138	10,116	+0.22%
255	Ingleside	City	San Patricio	Nueces	10,085	9,519	+5.95%
256	Raymondville	City	Willacy	—	10,082	10,236	−1.50%
257	Whitehouse	City	Smith	—	9,970	8,257	+20.75%
258	Cleveland	City	Liberty	Montgomery, San Patricio	9,936	7,471	+32.99%
259	Commerce	City	Hunt	—	9,928	9,090	+9.22%
260	Navasota	City	Grimes	Brazos	9,904	7,643	+29.58%
261	Woodway	City	McLennan	—	9,753	9,383	+3.94%
262	Vernon	City	Wilbarger	—	9,747	10,078	−3.28%
263	Bridge City	City	Orange	—	9,645	9,546	+1.04%
264	Marble Falls	City	Burnet	—	9,633	7,037	+36.89%
265	Vidor	City	Orange	—	9,597	9,789	−1.96%
266	Jacinto City	City	Harris	—	9,388	9,613	−2.34%
267	Joshua	City	Johnson	—	9,352	7,891	+18.51%
268	Pearsall	City	Frio	—	9,170	7,325	+25.19%
269	Liberty	City	Liberty	—	9,133	8,279	+10.32%
270	Hondo	City	Medina	—	9,130	8,289	+10.15%
271	Floresville	City	Wilson	—	9,105	7,203	+26.41%
272	Aubrey	City	Denton	—	9,066	5,006	+81.10%
273	Hillsboro	City	Hill	—	9,036	8,221	+9.91%
274	Decatur	City	Wise	—	9,029	6,538	+38.10%
275	Sunnyvale	Town	Dallas	—	9,008	7,893	+14.13%
276	Prairie View	City	Waller	—	8,969	8,184	+9.59%
277	Lucas	City	Collin	—	8,896	7,612	+16.87%
278	Venus	City	Johnson	Ellis	8,870	4,361	+103.39%
279	Aransas Pass	City	Nueces	Aransas, San Patricio	8,842	7,941	+11.35%
280	Graham	City	Young	—	8,814	8,732	+0.94%
281	Wharton	City	Wharton	—	8,776	8,627	+1.73%
282	Highland Park	Town	Dallas	—	8,764	8,864	−1.13%
283	Brownfield	City	Terry	—	8,762	8,936	−1.95%
284	Wolfforth	City	Lubbock	—	8,746	5,521	+58.41%
285	Los Fresnos	City	Cameron	—	8,703	8,114	+7.26%
286	Richland Hills	City	Tarrant	—	8,529	8,621	−1.07%
287	Bee Cave	City	Travis	—	8,464	9,144	−7.44%
288	Dalhart	City	Dallam	Hartley	8,377	8,447	−0.83%
289	Cuero	City	DeWitt	—	8,264	8,128	+1.67%
290	Kirby	City	Bexar	—	8,211	8,142	+0.85%
291	Hutchins	City	Dallas	—	8,206	5,607	+46.35%
292	Lamesa	City	Dawson	—	8,103	8,674	−6.58%
293	Magnolia	City	Montgomery	—	8,095	2,359	+243.15%
294	Pilot Point	City	Denton	Cooke, Grayson	8,052	4,381	+83.79%
295	Fort Stockton	City	Pecos	—	8,027	8,466	−5.19%
296	Van Alstyne	City	Grayson	Collin	8,012	4,369	+83.38%
297	Lampasas	City	Lampasas	—	7,988	7,291	+9.56%
298	Nolanville	City	Bell	—	7,983	5,917	+34.92%
299	Sealy	City	Austin	—	7,937	6,839	+16.05%
300	Lake Dallas	City	Denton	—	7,852	7,708	+1.87%
301	Perryton	City	Ochiltree	—	7,850	8,492	−7.56%
302	Crandall	City	Kaufman	—	7,730	3,860	+100.26%
303	Seminole	City	Gaines	—	7,730	6,988	+10.62%
304	Jersey Village	City	Harris	—	7,729	7,921	−2.42%
305	Hitchcock	City	Galveston	—	7,722	7,301	+5.77%
306	Willis	City	Montgomery	—	7,652	6,431	+18.99%
307	Alamo Heights	City	Bexar	—	7,632	7,357	+3.74%
308	Alvarado	City	Johnson	—	7,539	4,739	+59.08%
309	Jasper	City	Jasper	—	7,511	6,884	+9.11%
310	River Oaks	City	Tarrant	—	7,467	7,646	−2.34%
311	Willow Park	City	Parker	—	7,439	4,936	+50.71%
312	Monahans	City	Ward	Winkler	7,427	7,836	−5.22%
313	Lindale	City	Smith	—	7,385	6,059	+21.88%
314	Bulverde	City	Comal	—	7,337	5,692	+28.90%
315	Mabank	Town	Kaufman	Henderson	7,294	4,050	+80.10%
316	Justin	City	Denton	—	7,285	4,409	+65.23%
317	Lacy-Lakeview	City	McLennan	—	7,240	6,988	+3.61%
318	Gonzales	City	Gonzales	—	7,239	7,165	+1.03%
319	La Feria	City	Cameron	—	7,222	6,817	+5.94%
320	Hempstead	City	Waller	—	7,194	5,430	+32.49%
321	Gun Barrel City	City	Henderson	—	7,133	6,190	+15.23%
322	Aledo	City	Parker	—	7,122	4,858	+46.60%
323	Keene	City	Johnson	—	7,109	6,387	+11.30%
324	Mexia	City	Limestone	—	7,091	6,893	+2.87%
325	Burnet	City	Burnet	—	6,939	6,436	+7.82%
326	Bridgeport	City	Wise	—	6,915	5,923	+16.75%
327	Oak Point	City	Denton	—	6,909	4,357	+58.57%
328	Hickory Creek	Town	Denton	—	6,875	4,718	+45.72%
329	Krum	City	Denton	—	6,808	5,483	+24.17%
330	Wilmer	City	Dallas	—	6,768	4,974	+36.07%
331	Carthage	City	Panola	—	6,640	6,569	+1.08%
332	Silsbee	City	Hardin	—	6,613	6,935	−4.64%
333	Iowa Park	City	Wichita	—	6,542	6,535	+0.11%
334	Everman	City	Tarrant	—	6,537	6,154	+6.22%
335	Peñitas	City	Hidalgo	—	6,495	6,460	+0.54%
336	Parker	City	Collin	—	6,462	5,462	+18.31%
337	McGregor	City	McLennan	Coryell	6,405	5,321	+20.37%
338	Argyle	City	Denton	—	6,372	4,403	+44.72%
339	Crockett	City	Houston	—	6,346	6,332	+0.22%
340	Gladewater	City	Gregg	Upshur	6,306	6,134	+2.80%
341	White Oak	City	Gregg	—	6,186	6,225	−0.63%
342	Bowie	City	Montague	—	6,113	5,448	+12.21%
343	Brookshire	City	Waller	—	6,090	5,066	+20.21%
344	Edna	City	Jackson	—	6,088	5,987	+1.69%
345	Kermit	City	Winkler	—	6,019	6,267	−3.96%
346	Alpine	City	Brewster	—	5,989	6,035	−0.76%
347	Sinton	City	San Patricio	—	5,966	5,504	+8.39%
348	Luling	City	Caldwell	Guadalupe	5,920	5,599	+5.73%
349	Yoakum	City	Lavaca	DeWitt	5,900	5,908	−0.14%
350	Sandy Oaks	City	Bexar	—	5,874	5,075	+15.74%
351	Crystal City	City	Zavala	—	5,871	6,354	−7.60%
352	Jarrell	City	Williamson	—	5,870	1,753	+234.85%
353	Elsa	City	Hidalgo	—	5,820	5,668	+2.68%
354	Windcrest	City	Bexar	—	5,809	5,865	−0.95%
355	Wake Village	City	Bowie	—	5,796	5,945	−2.51%
356	Caddo Mills	City	Hunt	—	5,715	1,495	+282.27%
357	Rockdale	City	Milam	—	5,688	5,323	+6.86%
358	Slaton	City	Lubbock	—	5,684	5,858	−2.97%
359	Littlefield	City	Lamb	—	5,675	5,943	−4.51%
360	Childress	City	Childress	—	5,650	5,737	−1.52%
361	McLendon-Chisholm	City	Rockwall	Kaufman	5,629	3,562	+58.03%
362	Marlin	City	Falls	—	5,599	5,462	+2.51%
363	Rusk	City	Cherokee	—	5,568	5,285	+5.35%
364	Mineola	City	Wood	—	5,537	4,823	+14.80%
365	Farmersville	City	Collin	—	5,531	3,612	+53.13%
366	Granite Shoals	City	Burnet	—	5,498	5,129	+7.19%
367	Cameron	City	Milam	—	5,489	5,306	+3.45%
368	Atlanta	City	Cass	—	5,478	5,433	+0.83%
369	Primera	Town	Cameron	—	5,478	5,257	+4.20%
370	Giddings	City	Lee	—	5,425	4,969	+9.18%
371	Sansom Park	City	Tarrant	—	5,419	5,454	−0.64%
372	Livingston	Town	Polk	—	5,386	5,640	−4.50%
373	Waller	City	Waller	Harris	5,380	2,682	+100.60%
374	Horseshoe Bay	City	Llano	Burnet	5,339	4,257	+25.42%
375	Hudson	City	Angelina	—	5,328	4,849	+9.88%
376	Port Isabel	City	Cameron	—	5,302	5,028	+5.45%
377	Bullard	Town	Smith	Cherokee	5,301	3,318	+59.76%
378	Gilmer	City	Upshur	—	5,287	4,843	+9.17%
379	Haslet	City	Tarrant	Denton	5,267	1,952	+169.83%
380	La Joya	City	Hidalgo	—	5,257	4,457	+17.95%
381	Center	City	Shelby	—	5,246	5,221	+0.48%
382	Terrell Hills	City	Bexar	—	5,215	5,045	+3.37%
383	Nassau Bay	City	Harris	—	5,210	5,347	−2.56%
384	Springtown	City	Parker	Wise	5,204	3,064	+69.84%
385	Muleshoe	City	Bailey	—	5,162	5,160	+0.04%
386	Progreso	City	Hidalgo	—	5,148	4,807	+7.09%
387	Diboll	City	Angelina	—	5,125	4,457	+14.99%
388	Breckenridge	City	Stephens	—	5,123	5,187	−1.23%
389	Godley	City	Johnson	—	5,093	1,450	+251.24%
390	Canton	City	Van Zandt	—	5,070	4,229	+19.89%
391	Brady	City	McCulloch	—	4,980	5,118	−2.70%
392	Caldwell	City	Burleson	—	4,970	3,993	+24.47%
393	Hallsville	City	Harrison	—	4,895	4,277	+14.45%
394	Ovilla	City	Ellis	Dallas	4,808	4,304	+11.71%
395	Richwood	City	Brazoria	—	4,777	4,781	−0.08%
396	Lake Worth	City	Tarrant	—	4,766	4,711	+1.17%
397	Jourdanton	City	Atascosa	—	4,751	4,094	+16.05%
398	Morgan's Point Resort	City	Bell	—	4,746	4,636	+2.37%
399	Jacksboro	City	Jack	—	4,735	4,184	+13.17%
400	Hearne	City	Robertson	—	4,719	4,544	+3.85%
401	Pittsburg	City	Camp	—	4,676	4,335	+7.87%
402	Devine	City	Medina	—	4,652	4,324	+7.59%
403	Madisonville	City	Madison	—	4,605	4,420	+4.19%
404	Weston Lakes	City	Fort Bend	—	4,570	3,853	+18.61%
405	New Boston	City	Bowie	—	4,560	4,612	−1.13%
406	Meadows Place	City	Fort Bend	—	4,546	4,767	−4.64%
407	Anthony	Town	El Paso	—	4,539	3,671	+23.64%
408	Rio Bravo	City	Webb	—	4,523	4,450	+1.64%
409	La Grange	City	Fayette	—	4,509	4,391	+2.69%
410	Hunters Creek Village	City	Harris	—	4,498	4,385	+2.58%
411	Carrizo Springs	City	Dimmit	—	4,491	4,892	−8.20%
412	Comanche	City	Comanche	—	4,420	4,211	+4.96%
413	Spring Valley Village	City	Harris	—	4,402	4,229	+4.09%
414	Bellville	City	Austin	—	4,379	4,206	+4.11%
415	Garden Ridge	City	Comal	—	4,371	4,186	+4.42%
416	Palacios	City	Matagorda	—	4,370	4,395	−0.57%
417	Smithville	City	Bastrop	—	4,367	3,922	+11.35%
418	Mathis	City	San Patricio	—	4,312	4,333	−0.48%
419	Denver City	Town	Yoakum	Gaines	4,311	4,470	−3.56%
420	Ferris	City	Ellis	Dallas	4,291	2,788	+53.91%
421	Nash	City	Bowie	—	4,269	3,814	+11.93%
422	Falfurrias	City	Brooks	—	4,248	4,609	−7.83%
423	Tulia	City	Swisher	—	4,242	4,473	−5.16%
424	Whitesboro	City	Grayson	—	4,188	4,074	+2.80%
425	Chandler	City	Henderson	—	4,081	3,275	+24.61%
426	Dimmitt	City	Castro	—	4,069	4,171	−2.45%
427	Friona	City	Parmer	—	4,051	4,171	−2.88%
428	Wills Point	City	Van Zandt	—	4,033	3,747	+7.63%
429	Clyde	City	Callahan	—	4,024	3,811	+5.59%
430	Groesbeck	City	Limestone	—	3,995	3,631	+10.02%
431	Coleman	City	Coleman	—	3,991	3,912	+2.02%
432	Cisco	City	Eastland	—	3,980	3,883	+2.50%
433	Castle Hills	City	Bexar	—	3,948	3,978	−0.75%
434	Bunker Hill Village	City	Harris	—	3,896	3,822	+1.94%
435	Sullivan City	City	Hidalgo	—	3,891	3,908	−0.44%
436	Colorado City	City	Mitchell	—	3,884	3,991	−2.68%
437	Shavano Park	City	Bexar	—	3,861	3,524	+9.56%
438	Shenandoah	City	Montgomery	—	3,833	3,499	+9.55%
439	Reno	City	Parker	Tarrant	3,823	2,878	+32.84%
440	Columbus	City	Colorado	—	3,821	3,699	+3.30%
441	Dilley	City	Frio	—	3,809	3,274	+16.34%
442	Laguna Vista	Town	Cameron	—	3,780	3,520	+7.39%
443	Taylor Lake Village	City	Harris	—	3,774	3,704	+1.89%
444	Port Aransas	City	Nueces	—	3,773	2,904	+29.92%
445	Edgecliff Village	Town	Tarrant	—	3,759	3,788	−0.77%
446	Eastland	City	Eastland	—	3,737	3,609	+3.55%
447	Howe	Town	Grayson	—	3,686	3,571	+3.22%
448	Winnsboro	City	Wood	Franklin	3,678	3,455	+6.45%
449	Cockrell Hill	City	Dallas	—	3,628	3,815	−4.90%
450	West Columbia	City	Brazoria	—	3,636	3,644	−0.22%
451	Lytle	City	Atascosa	Medina, Bexar	3,626	2,914	+24.43%
452	Teague	City	Freestone	—	3,595	3,384	+6.24%
453	Sweeny	City	Brazoria	—	3,594	3,626	−0.88%
454	Llano	City	Llano	—	3,587	3,325	+7.88%
455	Troy	City	Bell	—	3,585	2,375	+50.95%
456	Cotulla	City	La Salle	—	3,583	3,718	−3.63%
457	Reno	City	Lamar	—	3,575	3,454	+3.50%
458	Annetta	Town	Parker	—	3,546	3,041	+16.61%
459	Eagle Lake	City	Colorado	—	3,546	3,442	+3.02%
460	Karnes City	City	Karnes	—	3,540	3,111	+13.79%
461	Clifton	City	Bosque	—	3,523	3,465	+1.67%
462	San Diego	City	Duval	Jim Wells	3,503	3,748	−6.54%
463	Ballinger	City	Runnels	—	3,499	3,619	−3.32%
464	Post	City	Garza	—	3,494	4,790	−27.06%
465	Hideaway	City	Smith	—	3,459	3,201	+8.06%
466	Castroville	City	Medina	—	3,444	2,954	+16.59%
467	Beach City	City	Chambers	—	3,438	3,221	+6.74%
468	Dublin	City	Erath	—	3,400	3,359	+1.22%
469	West Orange	City	Orange	—	3,391	3,459	−1.97%
470	Grand Saline	City	Van Zandt	—	3,319	3,107	+6.82%
471	Kenedy	City	Karnes	—	3,305	3,473	−4.84%
472	Crane	City	Crane	—	3,303	3,478	−5.03%
473	Talty	Town	Kaufman	—	3,299	2,500	+31.96%
474	DeCordova	City	Hood	—	3,296	3,007	+9.61%
475	Onalaska	City	Polk	—	3,289	3,020	+8.91%
476	Nocona	City	Montague	—	3,277	3,002	+9.16%
477	Henrietta	City	Clay	—	3,258	3,111	+4.73%
478	La Villa	City	Hidalgo	—	3,257	2,804	+16.16%
479	Combes	Town	Cameron	—	3,255	2,999	+8.54%
480	West Lake Hills	City	Travis	—	3,229	3,444	−6.24%
481	Cactus	City	Moore	—	3,165	3,057	+3.53%
482	Glen Rose	City	Somervell	—	3,148	2,659	+18.39%
483	Piney Point Village	City	Harris	—	3,141	3,128	+0.42%
484	Hollywood Park	Town	Bexar	—	3,140	3,130	+0.32%
485	San Saba	City	San Saba	—	3,126	3,117	+0.29%
486	Early	City	Brown	—	3,117	3,087	+0.97%
487	Needville	City	Fort Bend	—	3,114	3,089	+0.81%
488	Elmendorf	City	Bexar	Wilson	3,111	1,862	+67.08%
489	Montgomery	City	Montgomery	—	3,105	1,948	+59.39%
490	Kemah	City	Galveston	—	3,097	1,807	+71.39%
491	Haskell	City	Haskell	—	3,095	3,089	+0.19%
492	Double Oak	Town	Denton	—	3,051	3,054	−0.10%
493	Bishop	City	Nueces	—	3,040	3,174	−4.22%
494	Fairfield	City	Freestone	—	3,029	2,850	+6.28%
495	Hamilton	City	Hamilton	—	3,016	2,895	+4.18%
496	Poteet	City	Atascosa	—	3,010	2,795	+7.69%
497	Olney	City	Young	—	3,000	3,007	−0.23%
498	Shady Shores	Town	Denton	—	2,998	2,764	+8.47%
499	Van	City	Van Zandt	—	2,993	3,908	−23.41%
500	Oak Ridge North	City	Montgomery	—	2,991	3,057	−2.16%
501	El Lago	City	Harris	—	2,984	3,090	−3.43%
502	Stamford	City	Haskell	Jones	2,963	2,907	+1.93%
503	Shallowater	City	Lubbock	—	2,957	2,964	−0.24%
504	Spearman	City	Hansford	—	2,956	3,171	−6.78%
505	Hackberry	Town	Denton	—	2,954	2,973	−0.64%
506	Taft	City	San Patricio	—	2,939	2,801	+4.93%
507	Presidio	City	Presidio	—	2,909	3,264	−10.88%
508	Wimberley	City	Hays	—	2,909	2,839	+2.47%
509	Clarksville	City	Red River	—	2,908	2,857	+1.79%
510	Brazoria	City	Brazoria	—	2,882	2,866	+0.56%
511	Ponder	Town	Denton	—	2,863	2,442	+17.24%
512	Rancho Viejo	Town	Cameron	—	2,851	2,838	+0.46%
513	Schulenburg	City	Fayette	—	2,837	2,633	+7.75%
514	Abernathy	City	Hale	Lubbock	2,826	2,865	−1.36%
515	Hudson Oaks	City	Parker	—	2,800	2,174	+28.79%
516	Big Lake	City	Reagan	—	2,783	2,965	−6.14%
517	Combine	City	Kaufman	Dallas	2,769	2,245	+23.34%
518	Pottsboro	Town	Grayson	—	2,767	2,488	+11.21%
519	Refugio	Town	Refugio	—	2,752	2,712	+1.47%
520	Westworth Village	City	Tarrant	—	2,737	2,585	+5.88%
521	Hallettsville	City	Lavaca	—	2,736	2,731	+0.18%
522	Pelican Bay	City	Tarrant	—	2,729	2,049	+33.19%
523	Balcones Heights	City	Bexar	—	2,728	2,746	−0.66%
524	Stanton	City	Martin	—	2,694	2,657	+1.39%
525	Jonestown	City	Travis	—	2,687	2,365	+13.62%
526	Edcouch	City	Hidalgo	—	2,650	2,732	−3.00%
527	Palmer	Town	Ellis	—	2,644	2,393	+10.49%
528	West	City	McLennan	—	2,629	2,531	+3.87%
529	Mount Vernon	Town	Franklin	—	2,610	2,491	+4.78%
530	Escobares	City	Starr	—	2,585	2,588	−0.12%
531	Gunter	City	Grayson	—	2,574	2,060	+24.95%
532	Seymour	City	Baylor	—	2,574	2,575	−0.04%
533	Anson	City	Jones	—	2,570	2,294	+12.03%
534	Salado	Village	Bell	—	2,565	2,394	+7.14%
535	Palmhurst	City	Hidalgo	—	2,562	2,601	−1.50%
536	Boyd	Town	Wise	—	2,546	1,416	+79.80%
537	Daingerfield	City	Morris	—	2,539	2,522	+0.67%
538	Tahoka	City	Lynn	—	2,533	2,375	+6.65%
539	Panorama Village	City	Montgomery	—	2,522	2,515	+0.28%
540	Lowry Crossing	City	Collin	—	2,521	1,689	+49.26%
541	Junction	City	Kimble	—	2,513	2,451	+2.53%
542	Arcola	City	Fort Bend	—	2,499	2,034	+22.86%
543	Merkel	Town	Taylor	—	2,496	2,471	+1.01%
544	Hooks	City	Bowie	—	2,490	2,518	−1.11%
545	El Cenizo	City	Webb	—	2,457	2,540	−3.27%
546	Trinity	City	Trinity	—	2,450	2,343	+4.57%
547	Vinton	Village	El Paso	—	2,446	2,684	−8.87%
548	Pantego	Town	Tarrant	—	2,440	2,568	−4.98%
549	Tool	City	Henderson	—	2,427	2,175	+11.59%
550	Floydada	City	Floyd	—	2,420	2,675	−9.53%
551	Nixon	City	Gonzales	Wilson	2,406	2,341	+2.78%
552	St. Hedwig	Town	Bexar	—	2,404	2,227	+7.95%
553	Premont	City	Jim Wells	—	2,401	2,455	−2.20%
554	Hedwig Village	City	Harris	—	2,383	2,370	+0.55%
555	Sonora	City	Sutton	—	2,373	2,502	−5.16%
556	De Leon	City	Comanche	—	2,370	2,258	+4.96%
557	Briarcliff	Village	Travis	—	2,361	2,062	+14.50%
558	Santa Rosa	Town	Cameron	—	2,355	2,450	−3.88%
559	Seagraves	City	Gaines	—	2,352	2,153	+9.24%
560	Roman Forest	City	Montgomery	—	2,347	1,781	+31.78%
561	Woodville	Town	Tyler	—	2,339	2,403	−2.66%
562	Ranger	City	Eastland	—	2,335	2,300	+1.52%
563	Rio Hondo	City	Cameron	—	2,332	2,021	+15.39%
564	Copper Canyon	Town	Denton	—	2,322	1,731	+34.14%
565	The Hills	Village	Travis	—	2,322	2,613	−11.14%
566	Overton	City	Rusk	Smith	2,315	2,275	+1.76%
567	Freer	City	Duval	—	2,308	2,461	−6.22%
568	Odem	City	San Patricio	—	2,291	2,255	+1.60%
569	Blue Mound	City	Tarrant	—	2,288	2,393	−4.39%
570	Panhandle	Town	Carson	—	2,288	2,378	−3.78%
571	Dalworthington Gardens	City	Tarrant	—	2,276	2,293	−0.74%
572	Winters	City	Runnels	—	2,263	2,345	−3.50%
573	West Tawakoni	City	Hunt	—	2,261	1,895	+19.31%
574	East Bernard	City	Wharton	—	2,256	2,218	+1.71%
575	Malakoff	City	Henderson	—	2,253	2,179	+3.40%
576	Eden	City	Concho	—	2,248	1,100	+104.36%
577	Electra	City	Wichita	—	2,238	2,292	−2.36%
578	George West	City	Live Oak	—	2,238	2,171	+3.09%
579	Leonard	City	Fannin	—	2,212	1,987	+11.32%
580	Runaway Bay	City	Wise	—	2,212	1,546	+43.08%
581	Lyford	City	Willacy	—	2,210	2,249	−1.73%
582	Pinehurst	City	Orange	—	2,206	2,232	−1.16%
583	Weimar	City	Colorado	—	2,197	2,076	+5.83%
584	Troup	City	Smith	Cherokee	2,188	2,006	+9.07%
585	Olmos Park	City	Bexar	—	2,180	2,180	0.00%
586	Mason	City	Mason	—	2,171	2,121	+2.36%
587	Shiner	City	Lavaca	—	2,165	2,127	+1.79%
588	Huntington	City	Angelina	—	2,157	2,025	+6.52%
589	Splendora	City	Montgomery	—	2,146	1,683	+27.51%
590	Bertram	City	Burnet	—	2,142	1,616	+32.55%
591	Italy	Town	Ellis	—	2,140	1,926	+11.11%
592	Whitney	Town	Hill	—	2,134	1,992	+7.13%
593	Canadian	City	Hemphill	—	2,129	2,339	−8.98%
594	Johnson City	City	Blanco	—	2,127	1,627	+30.73%
595	Kountze	City	Hardin	—	2,127	1,981	+7.37%
596	Cresson	City	Hood	Johnson, Parker	2,126	1,349	+57.60%
597	Blanco	City	Blanco	—	2,108	1,682	+25.33%
598	Idalou	City	Lubbock	—	2,105	2,193	−4.01%
599	Quanah	City	Hardeman	—	2,097	2,279	−7.99%
600	Grandview	City	Johnson	—	2,090	1,879	+11.23%
601	South Padre Island	Town	Cameron	—	2,086	2,066	+0.97%
602	Collinsville	Town	Grayson	—	2,076	1,866	+11.25%
603	Patton Village	City	Montgomery	—	2,069	1,647	+25.62%
604	Quitman	City	Wood	—	2,057	1,942	+5.92%
605	Westlake	Town	Tarrant	Denton	2,057	1,623	+26.74%
606	Jefferson	City	Marion	—	2,056	1,875	+9.65%
607	Cooper	City	Delta	—	2,049	1,911	+7.22%
608	Kirbyville	City	Jasper	—	2,031	2,036	−0.25%
609	Anahuac	City	Chambers	—	2,023	1,980	+2.17%
610	Krugerville	City	Denton	—	2,021	1,766	+14.44%
611	Little River-Academy	City	Bell	—	2,020	1,992	+1.41%
612	Van Horn	Town	Culberson	—	2,020	1,941	+4.07%
613	Poth	Town	Wilson	—	2,014	1,819	+10.72%
614	Ganado	City	Jackson	—	2,009	1,975	+1.72%
615	Waskom	City	Harrison	—	1,980	1,910	+3.66%
616	Hale Center	City	Hale	—	1,979	2,062	−4.03%
617	Stratford	City	Sherman	—	1,978	1,939	+2.01%
618	Itasca	City	Hill	—	1,970	1,562	+26.12%
619	Memphis	City	Hall	—	1,969	2,048	−3.86%
620	Cross Roads	Town	Denton	—	1,965	1,744	+12.67%
621	Rhome	City	Wise	—	1,961	1,630	+20.31%
622	Uhland	City	Hays	Caldwell	1,958	1,588	+23.30%
623	Jones Creek	Village	Brazoria	—	1,952	1,975	−1.16%
624	Shepherd	City	San Jacinto	—	1,942	2,105	−7.74%
625	Bartonville	Town	Denton	—	1,937	1,725	+12.29%
626	Southside Place	City	Harris	—	1,916	1,835	+4.41%
627	Olton	City	Lamb	—	1,913	1,989	−3.82%
628	Buffalo	City	Leon	—	1,906	1,767	+7.87%
629	Albany	City	Shackelford	—	1,905	1,854	+2.75%
630	Hamlin	City	Jones	Fisher	1,876	1,831	+2.46%
631	Woodcreek	City	Hays	—	1,876	1,770	+5.99%
632	Somerset	City	Bexar	—	1,872	1,756	+6.61%
633	Hawkins	City	Wood	—	1,862	1,274	+46.15%
634	Clarendon	City	Donley	—	1,860	1,877	−0.91%
635	Mart	City	McLennan	Limestone	1,847	1,748	+5.66%
636	Ingram	City	Kerr	—	1,846	1,787	+3.30%
637	Sour Lake	City	Hardin	—	1,841	1,773	+3.84%
638	San Augustine	City	San Augustine	—	1,839	1,920	−4.22%
639	Beverly Hills	City	McLennan	—	1,835	1,878	−2.29%
640	Meadowlakes	City	Burnet	—	1,831	1,907	−3.99%
641	Lorena	City	McLennan	—	1,817	1,785	+1.79%
642	Linden	City	Cass	—	1,809	1,825	−0.88%
643	Honey Grove	City	Fannin	—	1,806	1,715	+5.31%
644	Franklin	City	Robertson	—	1,805	1,614	+11.83%
645	Yorktown	City	DeWitt	—	1,780	1,810	−1.66%
646	Goldthwaite	City	Mills	—	1,774	1,738	+2.07%
647	Wellington	City	Collingsworth	—	1,770	1,896	−6.65%
648	Edgewood	Town	Van Zandt	—	1,763	1,530	+15.23%
649	Bayou Vista	City	Galveston	—	1,755	1,763	−0.45%
650	Fritch	City	Hutchinson	—	1,751	1,859	−5.81%
651	Whitewright	Town	Grayson	Fannin	1,749	1,725	+1.39%
652	McCamey	City	Upton	—	1,743	1,831	−4.81%
653	Muenster	City	Cooke	—	1,742	1,536	+13.41%
654	Sunray	City	Moore	—	1,739	1,707	+1.87%
655	Holliday	City	Archer	—	1,733	1,524	+13.71%
656	Three Rivers	City	Live Oak	—	1,732	1,474	+17.50%
657	Goliad	City	Goliad	—	1,708	1,620	+5.43%
658	Gregory	City	San Patricio	—	1,708	1,740	−1.84%
659	Cottonwood Shores	City	Burnet	—	1,701	1,403	+21.24%
660	Shamrock	City	Wheeler	—	1,692	1,789	−5.42%
661	Morton	City	Cochran	—	1,689	1,690	−0.06%
662	Oak Leaf	City	Ellis	—	1,684	1,552	+8.51%
663	Danbury	City	Brazoria	—	1,683	1,671	+0.72%
664	Bartlett	City	Williamson	Bell	1,678	1,633	+2.76%
665	Bovina	City	Parmer	—	1,580	1,699	−7.00%
666	Plum Grove	City	Liberty	—	1,677	1,245	+34.70%
667	Alvord	Town	Wise	—	1,675	1,351	+23.98%
668	Oak Ridge	Town	Kaufman	—	1,671	771	+116.73%
669	New Fairview	City	Wise	Denton	1,666	1,386	+20.20%
670	Charlotte	City	Atascosa	—	1,653	1,524	+8.46%
671	Moody	City	McLennan	—	1,650	1,376	+19.91%
672	Fulton	Town	Aransas	—	1,647	1,523	+8.14%
673	Aurora	City	Wise	—	1,643	1,390	+18.20%
674	Archer City	City	Archer	—	1,647	1,601	+2.87%
675	Woodbranch	City	Montgomery	—	1,624	1,330	+22.11%
676	Quinlan	City	Hunt	—	1,601	1,414	+13.22%
677	Brookside Village	City	Brazoria	—	1,600	1,548	+3.36%
678	Newton	City	Newton	—	1,595	1,633	−2.33%
679	Stinnett	City	Hutchinson	—	1,594	1,650	−3.39%
680	Lakeside	Town	Tarrant	—	1,588	1,649	−3.70%
681	Marfa	City	Presidio	—	1,574	1,788	−11.97%
682	Ralls	City	Crosby	—	1,556	1,665	−6.55%
683	Poetry	Town	Hunt	Kaufman	1,542	1,344	+14.73%
684	Shoreacres	City	Harris	Chambers	1,535	1,566	−1.98%
685	Baird	City	Callahan	—	1,532	1,479	+3.58%
686	Hughes Springs	City	Cass	Morris	1,531	1,575	−2.79%
687	Seven Points	City	Henderson	Kaufman	1,530	1,370	+11.68%
688	Bells	Town	Grayson	—	1,525	1,521	+0.26%
689	Bangs	City	Brown	—	1,523	1,540	−1.10%
690	Nevada	City	Collin	—	1,522	1,314	+15.83%
691	Somerville	City	Burleson	—	1,517	1,312	+15.63%
692	Kerens	City	Navarro	—	1,508	1,505	+0.20%
693	Hubbard	City	Hill	—	1,507	1,394	+8.11%
694	Wolfe City	City	Hunt	—	1,503	1,399	+7.43%
695	La Vernia	City	Wilson	—	1,499	1,077	+39.18%
696	Hico	City	Hamilton	Erath	1,496	1,335	+12.06%
697	Old River-Winfree	City	Chambers	Liberty	1,495	1,315	+13.69%
698	Stockdale	City	Wilson	—	1,494	1,413	+5.73%
699	Blossom	City	Lamar	—	1,493	1,402	+6.49%
700	Bruceville-Eddy	City	McLennan	Falls	1,483	1,413	+4.95%
701	Grapeland	City	Houston	—	1,475	1,465	+0.68%
702	Tolar	City	Hood	—	1,472	941	+56.43%
703	Rollingwood	City	Travis	—	1,466	1,467	−0.07%
704	Eldorado	City	Schleicher	—	1,457	1,574	−7.43%
705	Thorndale	City	Milam	—	1,456	1,263	+15.28%
706	De Kalb	City	Bowie	—	1,455	1,527	−4.72%
707	Kemp	City	Kaufman	—	1,453	1,129	+28.70%
708	Wheeler	City	Wheeler	—	1,431	1,487	−3.77%
709	Emory	City	Rains	—	1,413	1,251	+12.95%
710	Flatonia	Town	Fayette	—	1,413	1,308	+8.03%
711	Naples	City	Morris	—	1,409	1,387	+1.59%
712	Crosbyton	City	Crosby	—	1,407	1,492	−5.70%
713	Meridian	City	Bosque	—	1,403	1,396	+0.50%
714	Tatum	City	Rusk	Panola	1,403	1,342	+4.55%
715	Queen City	City	Cass	—	1,393	1,397	−0.29%
716	Lone Star	City	Morris	—	1,391	1,400	−0.64%
717	Farwell	City	Parmer	—	1,387	1,425	−2.67%
718	Booker	Town	Lipscomb	Ochiltree	1,379	1,437	−4.04%
719	Sabinal	City	Uvalde	—	1,378	1,364	+1.03%
720	Ivanhoe	City	Tyler	—	1,376	1,327	+3.69%
721	Natalia	City	Medina	—	1,373	1,202	+14.23%
722	Wallis	City	Austin	—	1,372	1,292	+6.19%
723	Corrigan	Town	Polk	—	1,358	1,477	−8.06%
724	Menard	City	Menard	—	1,356	1,348	+0.59%
725	Rosebud	City	Falls	—	1,344	1,296	+3.70%
726	China	City	Jefferson	—	1,343	1,260	+6.59%
727	Lexington	Town	Lee	—	1,342	1,217	+10.27%
728	Lockney	Town	Floyd	—	1,340	1,498	−10.55%
729	Palm Valley	City	Cameron	—	1,340	1,413	−5.17%
730	Big Sandy	Town	Upshur	—	1,339	1,231	+8.77%
731	Rotan	City	Fisher	—	1,333	1,332	+0.08%
732	Brackettville	City	Kinney	—	1,327	1,341	−1.04%
733	Plains	Town	Yoakum	—	1,323	1,355	−2.36%
734	Brownsboro	City	Henderson	—	1,322	1,212	+9.08%
735	Sundown	City	Hockley	—	1,317	1,283	+2.65%
736	Lakeside City	Town	Archer	—	1,307	1,082	+20.79%
737	Newark	City	Wise	Tarrant	1,307	1,096	+19.25%
738	Tioga	Town	Grayson	—	1,302	1,142	+14.01%
739	Clear Lake Shores	City	Galveston	—	1,298	1,258	+3.18%
740	Martindale	City	Caldwell	—	1,298	1,253	+3.59%
741	Kempner	City	Lampasas	—	1,297	1,146	+13.18%
742	Valley Mills	City	Bosque	McLennan	1,293	1,229	+5.21%
743	Rice	City	Navarro	—	1,286	1,203	+6.90%
744	Ames	City	Liberty	—	1,282	937	+36.82%
745	Woodsboro	Town	Refugio	—	1,277	1,319	−3.18%
746	Gholson	City	McLennan	—	1,274	1,250	+1.92%
747	Pine Island	Town	Waller	—	1,271	1,077	+18.01%
748	Blue Ridge	City	Collin	—	1,265	1,180	+7.20%
749	Elkhart	Town	Anderson	—	1,265	1,287	−1.71%
750	Tye	City	Taylor	—	1,264	1,176	+7.48%
751	Lindsay	City	Cooke	—	1,261	1,045	+20.67%
752	LaCoste	City	Medina	—	1,255	1,077	+16.53%
753	Florence	City	Williamson	—	1,245	1,171	+6.32%
754	Rio Vista	City	Johnson	—	1,241	1,008	+23.12%
755	Von Ormy	City	Bexar	—	1,241	1,174	+5.71%
756	Oyster Creek	City	Brazoria	—	1,239	1,173	+5.63%
757	La Grulla	City	Starr	—	1,234	1,222	+0.98%
758	Point Venture	Village	Travis	—	1,233	1,260	−2.14%
759	Granger	City	Williamson	—	1,228	1,183	+3.80%
760	Ore City	City	Upshur	—	1,210	1,108	+9.21%
761	Roscoe	City	Nolan	—	1,208	1,271	−4.96%
762	Pleak	Village	Fort Bend	—	1,202	971	+23.79%
763	Daisetta	City	Liberty	—	1,194	923	+29.36%
764	Claude	City	Armstrong	—	1,190	1,186	+0.34%
765	Munday	City	Knox	—	1,190	1,246	−4.49%
766	Holland	Town	Bell	—	1,188	1,075	+10.51%
767	Orange Grove	City	Jim Wells	—	1,178	1,165	+1.12%
768	Ransom Canyon	Town	Lubbock	—	1,172	1,189	−1.43%
769	Niederwald	City	Hays	Caldwell	1,168	668	+74.85%
770	China Grove	Town	Bexar	—	1,149	1,141	+0.70%
771	Eustace	City	Henderson	—	1,143	1,137	+0.53%
772	Cut and Shoot	City	Montgomery	—	1,141	1,087	+4.97%
773	Weston	City	Collin	—	1,140	283	+302.83%
774	Frankston	Town	Anderson	—	1,133	1,126	+0.62%
775	Tiki Island	Village	Galveston	—	1,119	1,106	+1.18%
776	Bogata	City	Red River	—	1,118	1,074	+4.10%
777	Chico	City	Wise	—	1,116	946	+17.97%
778	Southmayd	City	Grayson	—	1,110	978	+13.50%
779	Marion	City	Guadalupe	—	1,101	1,034	+6.48%
780	Rogers	Town	Bell	—	1,101	1,113	−1.08%
781	Benavides	City	Duval	—	1,099	1,183	−7.10%
782	Sterling City	City	Sterling	—	1,094	1,121	−2.41%
783	White Deer	Town	Carson	—	1,082	918	+17.86%
784	Jamaica Beach	City	Galveston	—	1,071	1,078	−0.65%
785	Gruver	City	Hansford	—	1,064	1,130	−5.84%
786	Alto	Town	Cherokee	—	1,063	1,027	+3.51%
787	Riesel	City	McLennan	—	1,061	1,062	−0.09%
788	Robert Lee	City	Coke	—	1,061	1,027	+3.31%
789	Clint	Town	El Paso	—	1,060	923	+14.84%
790	Fairchilds	Village	Fort Bend	—	1,060	864	+22.69%
791	Holiday Lakes	Town	Brazoria	—	1,059	991	+6.86%
792	Los Indios	Town	Cameron	—	1,059	1,008	+5.06%
793	Santa Anna	Town	Coleman	—	1,043	1,014	+2.86%
794	Bevil Oaks	City	Jefferson	—	1,042	1,089	−4.32%
795	Wortham	Town	Navarro	—	1,041	980	+6.22%
796	New Waverly	City	Walker	—	1,031	914	+12.80%
797	Seadrift	City	Calhoun	—	1,031	995	+3.62%
798	Hemphill	City	Sabine	—	1,027	1,029	−0.19%
799	Mustang Ridge	City	Travis	Caldwell	1,025	944	+8.58%
800	Arp	City	Smith	—	1,020	892	+14.35%
801	Knox City	City	Knox	—	1,009	1,065	−5.26%
802	Centerville	City	Leon	—	1,006	905	+11.16%
803	Tenaha	Town	Shelby	—	1,005	989	+1.62%
804	Iraan	City	Pecos	—	998	1,055	−5.40%
805	Gorman	City	Eastland	—	995	976	+1.95%
806	Timpson	City	Shelby	—	995	989	+0.61%
807	St. Paul	Town	Collin	—	994	992	+0.20%
808	Lakeport	City	Gregg	—	993	976	+1.74%
809	New London	City	Rusk	—	993	958	+3.65%
810	Maud	City	Bowie	—	986	977	+0.92%
811	Calvert	City	Robertson	—	985	962	+2.39%
812	Bronte	Town	Coke	—	981	933	+5.14%
813	Post Oak Bend	Town	Kaufman	—	978	683	+43.19%
814	East Tawakoni	City	Rains	—	975	824	+18.33%
815	Tom Bean	City	Grayson	—	975	930	+4.84%
816	East Mountain	City	Upshur	Gregg	972	899	+8.12%
817	Hill Country Village	City	Bexar	—	970	942	+2.97%
818	Maypearl	City	Ellis	—	967	939	+2.98%
819	Petersburg	City	Hale	—	962	1,014	−5.13%
820	St. Jo	City	Montague	—	956	881	+8.51%
821	Waelder	City	Gonzales	—	954	933	+2.25%
822	Runge	Town	Karnes	—	952	892	+6.73%
823	Berryville	Town	Henderson	—	951	824	+15.41%
824	Coahoma	Town	Howard	—	938	945	−0.74%
825	Cross Plains	Town	Callahan	—	938	899	+4.34%
826	Paducah	Town	Cottle	—	938	1,063	−11.76%
827	Omaha	City	Morris	—	936	936	0.00%
828	Crawford	Town	McLennan	—	934	887	+5.30%
829	Sudan	City	Lamb	—	932	940	−0.85%
830	Miles	City	Runnels	—	931	875	+6.40%
831	Wink	City	Winkler	—	931	915	+1.75%
832	Celeste	City	Hunt	—	925	809	+14.34%
833	Red Lick	City	Bowie	—	924	946	−2.33%
834	Groveton	City	Trinity	—	922	918	+0.44%
835	Anton	City	Hockley	—	919	907	+1.32%
836	New Summerfield	City	Cherokee	—	915	843	+8.54%
837	Lorenzo	City	Crosby	—	910	964	−5.60%
838	Walnut Springs	City	Bosque	—	907	795	+14.09%
839	Scurry	Town	Kaufman	—	905	688	+31.54%
840	Pineland	City	Sabine	—	900	888	+1.35%
841	Beasley	City	Fort Bend	—	894	608	+47.04%
842	Bremond	City	Robertson	—	894	858	+4.20%
843	Trenton	City	Fannin	Grayson, Collin	894	743	+20.32%
844	Earth	City	Lamb	—	893	901	−0.89%
845	Wells	Town	Cherokee	—	893	853	+4.69%
846	Indian Lake	Town	Cameron	—	892	839	+6.32%
847	Bandera	City	Bandera	—	891	829	+7.48%
848	Vega	City	Oldham	—	891	879	+1.37%
849	Oak Grove	Town	Kaufman	—	888	617	+43.92%
850	Valley View	City	Cooke	—	887	737	+20.35%
851	Coldspring	City	San Jacinto	—	886	819	+8.18%
852	Thrall	City	Williamson	—	886	816	+8.58%
853	Log Cabin	City	Henderson	—	885	678	+30.53%
854	Blooming Grove	Town	Navarro	—	882	857	+2.92%
855	Garrett	Town	Ellis	—	880	829	+6.15%
856	Hardin	City	Liberty	—	878	768	+14.32%
857	Dennis	Town	Parker	—	870	727	+19.67%
858	Hart	City	Castro	—	865	869	−0.46%
859	Road Runner	Town	Cooke	—	863	766	+12.66%
860	Trinidad	City	Henderson	—	861	860	+0.12%
861	Kenefick	Town	Liberty	—	860	615	+39.84%
862	Point	City	Rains	—	853	745	+14.50%
863	Redwater	City	Bowie	—	853	853	0.00%
864	Rocksprings	Town	Edwards	—	851	874	−2.63%
865	Tuscola	City	Taylor	—	851	850	+0.12%
866	Moulton	Town	Lavaca	—	847	854	−0.82%
867	Jewett	City	Leon	—	845	793	+6.56%
868	Hilshire Village	City	Harris	—	843	816	+3.31%
869	Savoy	City	Fannin	—	836	712	+17.42%
870	Garrison	City	Nacogdoches	—	833	789	+5.58%
871	Spur	City	Dickens	—	825	863	−4.40%
872	Dawson	Town	Navarro	—	822	815	+0.86%
873	Sunrise Beach Village	City	Llano	—	820	739	+10.96%
874	Ector	City	Fannin	—	817	737	+10.85%
875	Lone Oak	City	Hunt	—	817	643	+27.06%
876	Milford	Town	Ellis	—	814	722	+12.74%
877	Knollwood	City	Grayson	—	809	764	+5.89%
878	Paradise	City	Wise	—	807	475	+69.89%
879	Coolidge	Town	Limestone	—	805	778	+3.47%
880	Lakewood Village	City	Denton	—	802	635	+26.30%
881	Bailey's Prairie	Village	Brazoria	—	801	775	+3.35%
882	Lometa	City	Lampasas	—	794	753	+5.44%
883	Weir	City	Williamson	—	792	699	+13.30%
884	Payne Springs	Town	Henderson	—	788	741	+6.34%
885	Noonday	City	Smith	—	781	612	+27.61%
886	Clarksville City	City	Gregg	Upshur	779	780	−0.13%
887	Throckmorton	Town	Throckmorton	—	776	727	+6.74%
888	Rising Star	Town	Eastland	—	767	756	+1.46%
889	Como	Town	Hopkins	—	758	728	+4.12%
890	Aspermont	Town	Stonewall	—	753	789	−4.56%
891	Winona	Town	Smith	—	747	623	+19.90%
892	Pecan Hill	City	Ellis	—	746	735	+1.50%
893	Beckville	City	Panola	—	745	722	+3.19%
894	New Deal	Town	Lubbock	—	745	730	+2.05%
895	Santa Clara	City	Guadalupe	—	745	778	−4.24%
896	Graford	City	Palo Pinto	—	742	669	+10.91%
897	O'Donnell	City	Lynn	Dawson	741	704	+5.26%
898	San Felipe	Town	Austin	—	739	691	+6.95%
899	Lake Tanglewood	Village	Randall	—	734	686	+7.00%
900	Point Blank	City	San Jacinto	—	734	643	+14.15%
901	Rankin	City	Upton	—	733	780	−6.03%
902	Joaquin	City	Shelby	—	732	734	−0.27%
903	Crowell	City	Foard	—	726	769	−5.59%
904	Cumby	City	Hopkins	—	726	679	+6.92%
905	Mertzon	City	Irion	—	726	747	−2.81%
906	New Berlin	City	Guadalupe	—	718	656	+9.45%
907	Detroit	Town	Red River	—	713	704	+1.28%
908	Cove	City	Chambers	—	705	525	+34.29%
909	Burke	City	Angelina	—	704	691	+1.88%
910	Golinda	City	Falls	McLennan	704	618	+13.92%
911	Annetta South	Town	Parker	—	701	621	+12.88%
912	Surfside Beach	City	Brazoria	—	694	640	+8.44%
913	New Hope	Town	Collin	—	687	661	+3.93%
914	Lott	City	Falls	—	686	644	+6.52%
915	Buffalo Gap	Town	Taylor	—	684	543	+25.97%
916	Hillcrest	Village	Brazoria	—	684	705	−2.98%
917	Bardwell	City	Ellis	—	676	625	+8.16%
918	Mountain City	City	Hays	—	675	622	+8.52%
919	Pattison	City	Waller	—	672	547	+22.85%
920	Driscoll	City	Nueces	—	665	680	−2.21%
921	Agua Dulce	City	Nueces	—	662	685	−3.36%
922	Asherton	City	Dimmit	—	659	722	−8.73%
923	Simonton	City	Fort Bend	—	656	647	+1.39%
924	New Chapel Hill	City	Smith	—	651	620	+5.00%
925	Westover Hills	Town	Tarrant	—	643	641	+0.31%
926	Amherst	City	Lamb	—	640	678	−5.60%
927	Silverton	City	Briscoe	—	639	629	+1.59%
928	Peaster	Town	Parker	—	636	550	+15.64%
929	Annetta North	Town	Parker	—	635	554	+14.62%
930	Ladonia	Town	Fannin	—	635	597	+6.37%
931	McLean	Town	Gray	—	634	665	−4.66%
932	Frost	City	Navarro	—	628	620	+1.29%
933	Zavalla	City	Angelina	—	625	603	+3.65%
934	Meadow	Town	Terry	—	623	601	+3.66%
935	Campbell	City	Hunt	—	613	542	+13.10%
936	Riverside	City	Walker	—	612	522	+17.24%
937	Sunset Valley	City	Travis	—	612	683	−10.40%
938	Stagecoach	Town	Montgomery	—	606	580	+4.48%
939	Ingleside on the Bay	City	San Patricio	—	604	614	−1.63%
940	Lovelady	City	Houston	—	590	570	+3.51%
941	Roby	City	Fisher	—	589	591	−0.34%
942	Cushing	City	Nacogdoches	—	584	557	+4.85%
943	Happy	Town	Swisher	Randall	584	602	−2.99%
944	Strawn	City	Palo Pinto	—	582	540	+7.78%
945	Hawley	City	Jones	—	580	545	+6.42%
946	Kress	City	Swisher	—	569	596	−4.53%
947	Rule	Town	Haskell	—	569	561	+1.43%
948	Miami	City	Roberts	—	565	539	+4.82%
949	Normangee	Town	Leon	Madison	563	495	+13.74%
950	Snook	City	Burleson	—	561	506	+10.87%
951	Bayview	Town	Cameron	—	556	475	+17.05%
952	Roxton	City	Lamar	—	556	548	+1.46%
953	Matador	Town	Motley	—	555	569	−2.46%
954	Lipan	City	Hood	—	554	505	+9.70%
955	Appleby	City	Nacogdoches	—	553	552	+0.18%
956	Deport	City	Lamar	Red River	552	550	+0.36%
957	Liverpool	City	Brazoria	—	550	475	+15.79%
958	Colmesneil	City	Tyler	—	549	542	+1.29%
959	Point Comfort	City	Calhoun	—	548	603	−9.12%
960	San Perlita	City	Willacy	—	545	538	+1.30%
961	Union Valley	City	Hunt	—	544	370	+47.03%
962	Encinal	City	La Salle	—	543	540	+0.56%
963	Newcastle	City	Young	—	540	526	+2.66%
964	Brazos Country	City	Austin	—	537	514	+4.47%
965	Thorntonville	Town	Ward	—	537	561	−4.28%
966	Petrolia	City	Clay	—	534	514	+3.89%
967	Briaroaks	City	Johnson	—	533	507	+5.13%
968	Star Harbor	City	Henderson	—	533	482	+10.58%
969	Groom	Town	Carson	—	530	552	−3.99%
970	Hawk Cove	City	Hunt	—	530	452	+17.26%
971	San Leanna	Village	Travis	—	530	522	+1.53%
972	DISH	Town	Denton	—	525	437	+20.14%
973	Dean	City	Clay	—	521	488	+6.76%
974	Volente	Village	Travis	—	521	561	−7.13%
975	Plantersville	City	Grimes	—	520	464	+12.07%
976	Murchison	City	Henderson	—	519	516	+0.58%
977	Fruitvale	City	Van Zandt	—	518	476	+8.82%
978	Mount Enterprise	City	Rusk	—	517	505	+2.38%
979	Chillicothe	City	Hardeman	—	513	549	−6.56%
980	Alba	Town	Wood	Rains	511	473	+8.03%
981	Grey Forest	City	Bexar	—	510	492	+3.66%
982	Camp Wood	City	Real	—	509	517	−1.55%
983	Easton	City	Gregg	Rusk	507	499	+1.60%
984	Gordon	City	Palo Pinto	—	505	470	+7.45%
985	Pine Forest	City	Orange	—	504	499	+1.00%
986	Loraine	Town	Mitchell	—	503	504	−0.20%
987	Smiley	City	Gonzales	—	501	475	+5.47%
988	Cross Timber	Town	Johnson	—	495	362	+36.74%
989	Webberville	Village	Travis	—	495	394	+25.63%
990	Texline	Town	Dallam	—	492	448	+9.82%
991	Lake City	Town	San Patricio	—	488	447	+9.17%
992	Talco	City	Titus	—	485	494	−1.82%
993	Devers	City	Liberty	—	482	361	+33.52%
994	Union Grove	City	Upshur	—	477	441	+8.16%
995	Bear Creek	Village	Hays	—	476	397	+19.90%
996	Falls City	City	Karnes	—	476	514	−7.39%
997	Timbercreek Canyon	Village	Randall	—	476	430	+10.70%
998	Morgan	City	Bosque	—	475	454	+4.63%
999	Bryson	City	Jack	—	474	430	+10.23%
1,000	Mildred	Town	Navarro	—	473	399	+18.55%
1,001	Nome	City	Jefferson	—	472	469	+0.64%
1,002	Byers	City	Clay	—	469	454	+3.30%
1,003	Evant	Town	Coryell	Hamilton	467	455	+2.64%
1,004	Wilson	City	Lynn	—	464	434	+6.91%
1,005	Ropesville	City	Hockley	—	463	430	+7.67%
1,006	Kosse	Town	Limestone	—	462	458	+0.87%
1,007	Hallsburg	City	McLennan	—	455	419	+8.59%
1,008	Jayton	City	Kent	—	453	511	−11.35%
1,009	San Patricio	City	San Patricio	—	453	384	+17.97%
1,010	Angus	City	Navarro	—	448	444	+0.90%
1,011	Big Wells	City	Dimmit	—	448	483	−7.25%
1,012	Smyer	Town	Hockley	—	448	441	+1.59%
1,013	Buffalo Springs	Village	Lubbock	—	445	468	−4.91%
1,014	Oglesby	City	Coryell	—	445	441	+0.91%
1,015	Retreat	Town	Navarro	—	443	410	+8.05%
1,016	Yantis	Town	Wood	—	443	405	+9.38%
1,017	Wickett	Town	Ward	—	440	422	+4.27%
1,018	Alma	Town	Ellis	—	439	373	+17.69%
1,019	Avery	Town	Red River	—	432	421	+2.61%
1,020	Milano	City	Milam	—	432	390	+10.77%
1,021	Scotland	City	Archer	—	432	413	+4.60%
1,022	Millsap	Town	Parker	—	431	370	+16.49%
1,023	Leary	City	Bowie	—	430	433	−0.69%
1,024	Thornton	Town	Limestone	—	429	421	+1.90%
1,025	Lefors	Town	Gray	—	426	420	+1.43%
1,026	Blum	Town	Hill	—	421	383	+9.92%
1,027	Grays Prairie	Village	Kaufman	—	419	325	+28.92%
1,028	Gustine	Town	Comanche	—	419	392	+6.89%
1,029	Stockton Bend	City	Hood	—	419	380	+10.26%
1,030	Kendleton	City	Fort Bend	—	417	343	+21.57%
1,031	Winfield	City	Titus	—	416	422	−1.42%
1,032	Bedias	City	Grimes	—	411	361	+13.85%
1,033	Dodd City	Town	Fannin	—	410	369	+11.11%
1,034	Oak Valley	Town	Navarro	—	409	406	+0.74%
1,035	South Mountain	Town	Coryell	—	409	411	−0.49%
1,036	Highland Haven	City	Burnet	—	407	418	−2.63%
1,037	Rosser	Village	Kaufman	—	407	301	+35.22%
1,038	Oakwood	Town	Leon	Freestone	405	389	+4.11%
1,039	Creedmoor	City	Travis	Hays	402	458	−12.23%
1,040	Balmorhea	City	Reeves	—	399	408	−2.21%
1,041	Kurten	Town	Brazos	—	395	395	0.00%
1,042	Lake Bridgeport	City	Wise	—	395	339	+16.52%
1,043	Sanctuary	Town	Parker	—	388	337	+15.13%
1,044	Buckholts	Town	Milam	—	387	365	+6.03%
1,045	Enchanted Oaks	Town	Henderson	—	383	347	+10.37%
1,046	Skellytown	Town	Carson	—	383	394	−2.79%
1,047	Avinger	Town	Cass	—	379	371	+2.16%
1,048	Chireno	City	Nacogdoches	—	378	370	+2.16%
1,049	Abbott	City	Hill	—	377	352	+7.10%
1,050	Callisburg	City	Cooke	—	375	321	+16.82%
1,051	Eureka	City	Navarro	—	374	313	+19.49%
1,052	Edom	City	Van Zandt	—	372	339	+9.73%
1,053	Whiteface	Town	Cochran	—	371	375	−1.07%
1,054	Howardwick	City	Donley	—	370	370	0.00%
1,055	Pleasant Valley	Town	Wichita	—	366	357	+2.52%
1,056	Sadler	City	Grayson	—	365	336	+8.63%
1,057	Christine	Town	Atascosa	—	363	337	+7.72%
1,058	Lakeside	Town	San Patricio	—	363	338	+7.40%
1,059	Blanket	Town	Brown	—	362	369	−1.90%
1,060	Follett	City	Lipscomb	—	361	373	−3.22%
1,061	Leroy	City	McLennan	—	361	354	+1.98%
1,062	Quitaque	City	Briscoe	—	357	342	+4.39%
1,063	Iola	City	Grimes	—	354	311	+13.83%
1,064	Windthorst	Town	Archer	Clay	354	342	+3.51%
1,065	Higgins	City	Lipscomb	—	353	356	−0.84%
1,066	New Home	City	Lynn	—	350	326	+7.36%
1,067	Reklaw	City	Rusk	Cherokee	349	332	+5.12%
1,068	Nordheim	City	DeWitt	—	346	336	+2.98%
1,069	Gallatin	City	Cherokee	—	344	321	+7.17%
1,070	Huxley	City	Shelby	—	344	361	−4.71%
1,071	Orchard	City	Fort Bend	—	344	313	+9.90%
1,072	Rose City	City	Orange	—	344	326	+5.52%
1,073	Gary City	City	Panola	—	343	335	+2.39%
1,074	Tira	Town	Hopkins	—	343	319	+7.52%
1,075	Scottsville	City	Harrison	—	341	334	+2.10%
1,076	Mount Calm	City	Hill	—	336	282	+19.15%
1,077	Grandfalls	Town	Ward	—	330	340	−2.94%
1,078	Rose Hill Acres	City	Hardin	—	329	325	+1.23%
1,079	Bloomburg	Town	Cass	—	328	321	+2.18%
1,080	Leakey	City	Real	—	328	315	+4.13%
1,081	Warren City	City	Gregg	Upshur	321	319	+0.63%
1,082	Turkey	City	Hall	—	316	317	−0.32%
1,083	Iredell	City	Bosque	—	314	305	+2.95%
1,084	Lawn	Town	Taylor	—	313	311	+0.64%
1,085	Oak Ridge	Town	Cooke	—	312	242	+28.93%
1,086	North Cleveland	City	Liberty	—	310	225	+37.78%
1,087	Nazareth	City	Castro	—	307	310	−0.97%
1,088	Coupland	City	Williamson	—	305	289	+5.54%
1,089	Covington	City	Hill	—	303	261	+16.09%
1,090	Darrouzett	Town	Lipscomb	—	303	309	−1.94%
1,091	Cashion Community	City	Wichita	—	301	286	+5.24%
1,092	Ellinger	City	Fayette	—	299	285	+4.91%
1,093	Trent	Town	Taylor	—	299	295	+1.36%
1,094	Bellevue	City	Clay	—	298	289	+3.11%
1,095	Industry	City	Austin	—	298	268	+11.19%
1,096	Coyote Flats	City	Johnson	—	297	345	−13.91%
1,097	Palisades	Village	Randall	—	295	268	+10.07%
1,098	Poynor	Town	Henderson	—	290	287	+1.05%
1,099	Double Horn	City	Burnet	—	289	260	+11.15%
1,100	Burton	City	Washington	—	288	297	−3.03%
1,101	Carbon	Town	Eastland	—	287	281	+2.14%
1,102	Cranfills Gap	City	Bosque	—	285	277	+2.89%
1,103	Kennard	City	Houston	—	285	272	+4.78%
1,104	Taylor Landing	City	Jefferson	—	285	278	+2.52%
1,105	Granjeno	City	Hidalgo	—	284	283	+0.35%
1,106	Progreso Lakes	City	Hidalgo	—	281	257	+9.34%
1,107	Bayside	Town	Refugio	—	279	275	+1.45%
1,108	Dell City	City	Hudspeth	—	275	245	+12.24%
1,109	Streetman	Town	Freestone	Navarro	275	248	+10.89%
1,110	Goodrich	City	Polk	—	273	248	+10.08%
1,111	Morgan's Point	City	Harris	Dawson	272	273	−0.37%
1,112	Paint Rock	Town	Concho	—	272	237	+14.77%
1,113	Hays	City	Hays	—	271	227	+19.38%
1,114	Ackerly	City	Martin	Dawson	269	264	+1.89%
1,115	Chester	Town	Tyler	—	269	270	−0.37%
1,116	Spring Branch	City	Comal	—	267	206	+29.61%
1,117	Richland	Town	Navarro	—	266	255	+4.31%
1,118	Hedley	City	Donley	—	264	275	−4.00%
1,119	Coffee City	Town	Henderson	—	263	249	+5.62%
1,120	Lueders	City	Jones	Shackelford	262	258	+1.55%
1,121	Cottonwood	City	Kaufman	—	258	181	+42.54%
1,122	Carmine	City	Fayette	Washington	255	244	+4.51%
1,123	Richland Springs	Town	San Saba	—	255	244	+4.51%
1,124	Rochester	Town	Haskell	—	255	248	+2.82%
1,125	Fayetteville	City	Fayette	—	254	246	+3.25%
1,126	Malone	Town	Hill	—	253	237	+6.75%
1,127	Barstow	City	Ward	—	252	265	−4.91%
1,128	Channing	City	Hartley	—	252	281	−10.32%
1,129	Blackwell	City	Nolan	Coke	251	258	−2.71%
1,130	Barry	City	Navarro	—	250	220	+13.64%
1,131	Mingus	City	Palo Pinto	—	250	223	+12.11%
1,132	Texhoma	City	Sherman	—	249	258	−3.49%
1,133	Navarro	Town	Navarro	—	246	232	+6.03%
1,134	Sandy Point	City	Brazoria	—	243	207	+17.39%
1,135	Cool	City	Parker	—	242	211	+14.69%
1,136	Bailey	City	Fannin	—	241	220	+9.55%
1,137	Opdyke West	Town	Hockley	—	240	220	+9.09%
1,138	Latexo	City	Houston	—	238	232	+2.59%
1,139	Moran	City	Shackelford	—	237	226	+4.87%
1,140	South Frydek	City	Austin	—	237	207	+14.49%
1,141	Woodson	Town	Throckmorton	—	237	219	+8.22%
1,142	Goldsmith	City	Ector	—	235	236	−0.42%
1,143	Tehuacana	Town	Limestone	—	230	228	+0.88%
1,144	Wellman	City	Terry	—	229	230	−0.43%
1,145	Wixon Valley	City	Brazos	—	228	228	0.00%
1,146	Carl's Corner	Town	Hill	—	227	201	+12.94%
1,147	Anderson	City	Grimes	—	217	193	+12.44%
1,148	Emhouse	Town	Navarro	—	216	187	+15.51%
1,149	Douglassville	Town	Cass	—	214	211	+1.42%
1,150	Bonney	Village	Brazoria	—	210	180	+16.67%
1,151	La Ward	City	Jackson	—	210	176	+19.32%
1,152	Caney City	Town	Henderson	—	209	187	+11.76%
1,153	Roaring Springs	Town	Motley	—	209	217	−3.69%
1,154	Forsan	City	Howard	—	207	225	−8.00%
1,155	Dickens	City	Dickens	—	206	219	−5.94%
1,156	Westbrook	City	Mitchell	—	206	201	+2.49%
1,157	Windom	Town	Fannin	—	205	189	+8.47%
1,158	Marquez	City	Leon	—	199	181	+9.94%
1,159	Ross	City	McLennan	—	197	245	−19.59%
1,160	Penelope	Town	Hill	—	196	180	+8.89%
1,161	Ravenna	City	Fannin	—	196	175	+12.00%
1,162	Bishop Hills	Town	Potter	—	195	211	−7.58%
1,163	Midway	City	Madison	—	191	173	+10.40%
1,164	Benjamin	City	Knox	—	189	196	−3.57%
1,165	Pecan Gap	City	Delta	Fannin	186	178	+4.49%
1,166	Thompsons	Town	Fort Bend	—	186	156	+19.23%
1,167	Annona	Town	Red River	—	185	184	+0.54%
1,168	Staples	City	Guadalupe	—	185	193	−4.15%
1,169	Hebron	Town	Denton	Collin	182	803	−77.33%
1,170	Bynum	Town	Hill	—	180	171	+5.26%
1,171	Broaddus	Town	San Augustine	—	178	184	−3.26%
1,172	Megargel	Town	Archer	—	178	174	+2.30%
1,173	Woodloch	Town	Montgomery	—	177	186	−4.84%
1,174	Weinert	City	Haskell	—	175	172	+1.74%
1,175	Leona	City	Leon	—	173	151	+14.57%
1,176	Moore Station	City	Henderson	—	173	160	+8.13%
1,177	Goodlow	City	Navarro	—	172	178	−3.37%
1,178	Mobile City	City	Rockwall	—	172	142	+21.13%
1,179	Jolly	City	Clay	—	168	172	−2.33%
1,180	Mertens	Town	Hill	—	156	144	+8.33%
1,181	Browndell	City	Jasper	—	154	160	−3.75%
1,182	Goree	City	Knox	—	152	158	−3.80%
1,183	Kingsbury	City	Guadalupe	—	143	132	+8.33%
1,184	Springlake	Town	Lamb	—	138	145	−4.83%
1,185	Adrian	City	Oldham	—	136	128	+6.25%
1,186	Mullin	Town	Mills	—	130	130	0.00%
1,187	Sanford	Town	Hutchinson	—	129	132	−2.27%
1,188	Todd Mission	City	Grimes	—	126	121	+4.13%
1,189	Melvin	Town	McCulloch	—	122	123	−0.81%
1,190	Novice	City	Coleman	—	122	122	0.00%
1,191	Estelline	Town	Hall	—	120	121	−0.83%
1,192	Cuney	Town	Cherokee	—	119	116	+2.59%
1,193	Powell	Town	Navarro	—	117	99	+18.18%
1,194	Aquilla	City	Hill	—	115	101	+13.86%
1,195	Marietta	Town	Cass	—	115	115	0.00%
1,196	Austwell	City	Refugio	—	114	118	−3.39%
1,197	Kirvin	Town	Freestone	—	113	101	+11.88%
1,198	Round Mountain	Town	Blanco	—	109	101	+7.92%
1,199	Dorchester	City	Grayson	—	98	69	+42.03%
1,200	Round Top	Town	Fayette	—	95	87	+9.20%
1,201	Toco	City	Lamar	—	92	91	+1.10%
1,202	O'Brien	City	Haskell	—	91	91	0.00%
1,203	Uncertain	City	Harrison	—	90	85	+5.88%
1,204	Dodson	Town	Collingsworth	—	89	93	−4.30%
1,205	Edmonson	Town	Hale	—	87	86	+1.16%
1,206	Mobeetie	City	Wheeler	—	86	87	−1.15%
1,207	Domino	Town	Cass	—	83	71	+16.90%
1,208	Sun Valley	City	Lamar	—	77	70	+10.00%
1,209	Miller's Cove	Town	Titus	—	76	71	+7.04%
1,210	Neylandville	Town	Hunt	—	76	67	+13.43%
1,211	Pyote	Town	Ward	—	73	72	+1.39%
1,212	Seven Oaks	City	Polk	—	73	68	+7.35%
1,213	Putnam	Town	Callahan	—	70	63	+11.11%
1,214	Petronila	City	Nueces	—	65	89	−26.97%
1,215	Valentine	Town	Jeff Davis	—	61	73	−16.44%
1,216	Dayton Lakes	City	Liberty	—	60	45	+33.33%
1,217	Lakeview	Town	Hall	—	60	60	0.00%
1,218	Toyah	Town	Reeves	—	60	61	−1.64%
1,219	Rocky Mound	Town	Camp	—	59	78	−24.36%
1,220	Spofford	City	Kinney	—	43	41	+4.88%
1,221	Corral City	Town	Denton	—	41	33	+24.24%
1,222	Quintana	Town	Brazoria	—	25	26	−3.85%
1,223	Los Ybanez	City	Dawson	—	20	28	−28.57%
1,224	Impact	Town	Taylor	—	18	22	−18.18%
Total of 1,224 municipalities			254 Counties		31,709,821	29,145,505	8.80%

== See also ==
- Texas
- List of census-designated places in Texas
- List of unincorporated communities in Texas
