= Amarillo metropolitan area =

- Metropolitan statistical area
- Amarillo, TX MSA
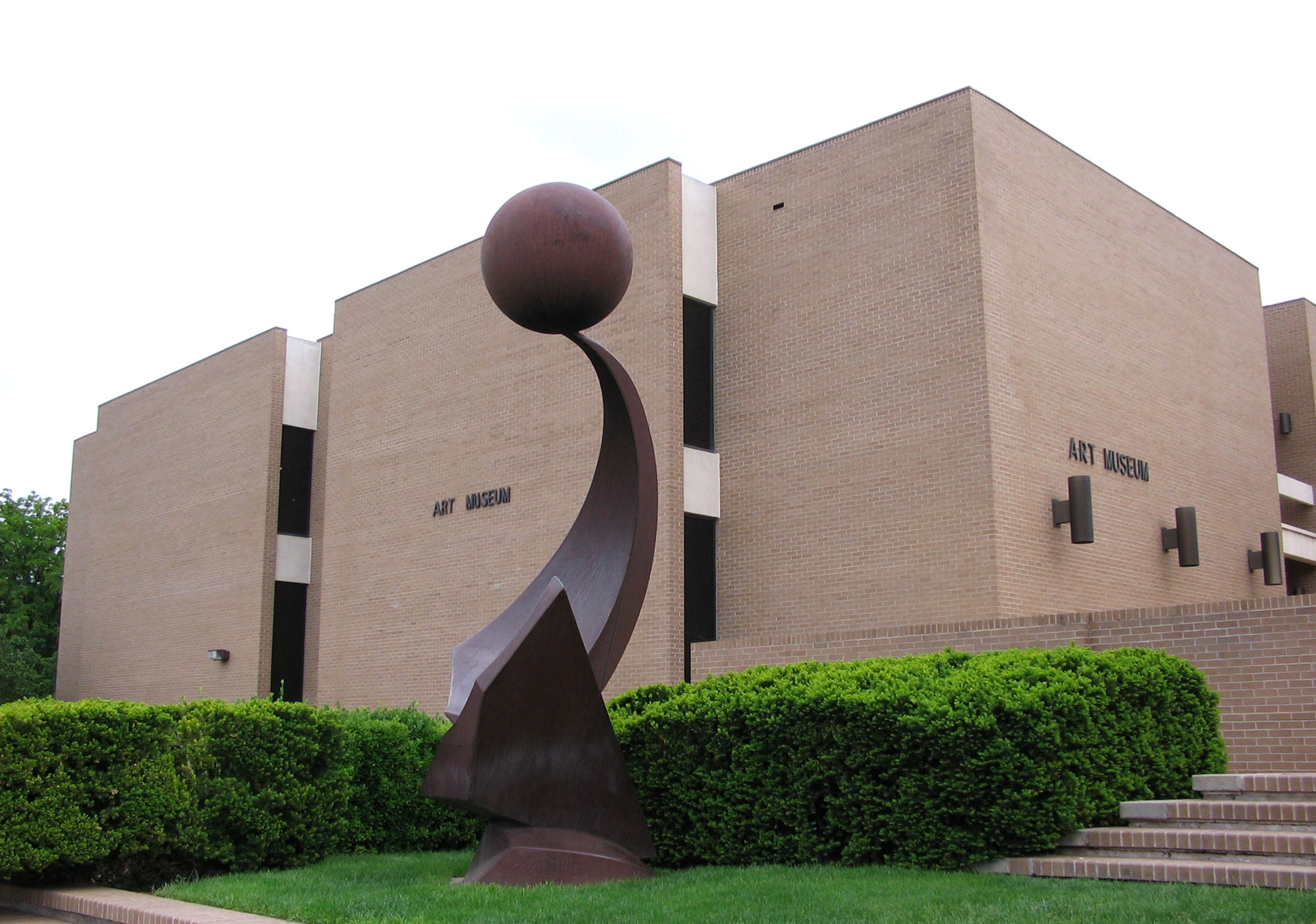
- Amarillo Museum of Art
Interactive map of Amarillo–Borger, TX CSA
City of Amarillo
Amarillo, TX MSA
Borger, TX, USA
- Country: United States
- State: Texas
- Largest city: Amarillo
- Other cities: Canyon, Claude, Panhandle, White Deer, Groom, Happy, Lake Tanglewood, Skellytown, Bishop Hills, Palisades, Timbercreek Canyon, Bushland, Goodnight, Umbarger, Washburn, Wayside

Area
  - Total: 5,185 sq mi (13,430 km^{2})

Population
  - Total: 268,691

GDP
  - Total: $17.376 billion (2022)
- Time zone: UTC-6 (CST)
  - Summer (DST): UTC-5 (CDT)

The Amarillo, TX Metropolitan Statistical Area is a metropolitan area in the Texas Panhandle that covers five counties: Armstrong, Carson, Potter, Randall, and Oldham. As of the 2020 census, the metropolitan statistical area (MSA) had a population of 268,691, increasing to an estimated 276,235 in 2025. The MSA is the 185th largest in the United States. The Amarillo MSA is a component of the broader Amarillo–Borger, TX Combined Statistical Area (CSA), which also includes the Borger micropolitan area (Hutchinson County). The CSA is the 118th largest in the United States as of 2025, with a total population of 295,868.

== Counties ==
- Armstrong
- Carson
- Potter
- Randall
- Oldham

== Communities ==
=== Places with more than 100,000 people ===
- Amarillo (principal city)

=== Places with 1,000 to 15,000 people ===
- Canyon
- Claude
- Panhandle
- White Deer

=== Places with 500 to 1,000 people ===
- Groom
- Happy (partial)
- Lake Tanglewood
- Skellytown

=== Places with fewer than 500 people ===
- Bishop Hills
- Palisades
- Timbercreek Canyon

=== Unincorporated places ===
- Bushland
- Goodnight
- Umbarger
- Washburn
- Wayside

== Demographics ==
As of the census of 2020, 268,691 people, 97,747 households, and 65,455 families resided within the MSA. The racial makeup of the MSA was 65.4% White (non-Hispanic White 57.1%), 6.2% African American, 1.0% Native American, 3.2% Asian, 0.04% Pacific Islander, 9.6% from other races, and 14.0% from two or more races. Hispanics or Latinos of any race were 29.0% of the population.

The median income for a household in the MSA was $37,671 and for a family was $44,696. Males had a median income of $31,710 versus $22,686 for females. The per capita income for the MSA was $18,327.

County	Seat	2025 estimate	2020 Census	Change	Area	Density
Randall	Canyon	152,351	140,753	+8.24%	922 sq mi (2,388 km^{2})	165/sq mi (64/km^{2})
Potter	Amarillo	114,453	118,525	−3.44%	922 sq mi (2,388 km^{2})	124/sq mi (48/km^{2})
Carson	Panhandle	5,805	5,807	−0.03%	924 sq mi (2,393 km^{2})	6/sq mi (2/km^{2})
Armstrong	Claude	1,843	1,848	−0.27%	914 sq mi (2,367 km^{2})	2/sq mi (1/km^{2})
Oldham	Vega	1,783	1,758	+1.42%	1,501 sq mi (3,888 km^{2})	1/sq mi (0/km^{2})
Total		276,235	268,691	+2.81%	5,183 sq mi (13,424 km^{2})	53/sq mi (21/km^{2})

== Combined Statistical Area ==
The Amarillo–Borger, TX Combined Statistical Area is made up of six counties in the Texas Panhandle. The combined statistical area includes one metropolitan area and one micropolitan area. It had a population of 289,308 at the 2020 census, increasing to an estimated 295,868 in 2025. The CSA is the 118th largest in the United States.

Statistical Area	2025 estimate	2020 Census	Change	Area	Density
Amarillo, TX Metropolitan Statistical Area	276,235	268,691	+2.81%	5,183 sq mi (13,424 km^{2})	53/sq mi (21/km^{2})
Borger, TX Micropolitan Statistical Area	19,633	20,617	−4.77%	895 sq mi (2,318 km^{2})	22/sq mi (8/km^{2})
Total	295,868	289,308	+2.27%	6,078 sq mi (15,740 km^{2})	49/sq mi (19/km^{2})

== See also ==
- List of cities in Texas
- List of museums in the Texas Panhandle
- Texas census statistical areas
- List of Texas metropolitan areas
