= Kaufman Independent School District =

School district in Texas, United States

Address
- 1000 S. Houston Street Kaufman, Texas, USA ESC Region 10
- Coordinates: 32°35′3″N 96°18′57″W

District information
- Type: Independent School District
- Motto: Big City Education. Small Town Values.
- Grades: PK-12
- Superintendent: Dr. Joshua Garcia
- Governing agency: Texas Education Agency
- Schools: 7
- NCES District ID: 4825200

Students and staff
- Students: 4,216 (2025-2026)
- Athletic conference: UIL Class AAAA
- District mascot: Lions
- Colors: Black; Gold

Other information
- Website: www.kaufmanisd.net

Kaufman Independent School District (Kaufman ISD or KISD) is a public school district based in Kaufman, Texas, United States.

Covering approximately 166 square miles in Kaufman County, the district serves the cities of Kaufman, Oak Ridge, Oak Grove, and Post Oak Bend.

As of the 2026 school year, Kaufman ISD operates 7 campuses, including 1 high school, 1 middle school, 4 primary schools, and 1 alternative school. The district most recently received a "B" rating from the Texas Education Agency (TEA).

== Schools ==
| Name | Grades | Established | Additional Information |
|---|---|---|---|
| Kaufman High School | 9-12 | 1904 | |
| Gary Campbell High School | 9-12 | 1995 | Alternative high school |
| Norman Junior High School | 6-8 | Unknown | |
| Kaufman Middle School (under construction) | 6-8 | 2027 (planned) | Scheduled to open for the 2027–2028 school year; groundbreaking held October 27, 2025. |
| Monday Elementary School | 1-5 | 1965 | |
| Nash Elementary School | 1-5 | 1973 | |
| Phillips Elementary School | 1-5 | 1982 | |
| Edwards Early Childhood Center | PK-K | 2003 | |
