= Gary Campbell High School =

Public school in Texas, United States

Coordinates: 32.5656°N 96.3155°W

Gary W. Campbell High School

Location
- 3507 S. Houston St. Kaufman, Texas 75142-2298; United States

Information
- School type: Public alternative high school
- School district: Kaufman Independent School District
- Principal: Cindy Fowler
- Staff: 9.00 (FTE)
- Grades: 9-12
- Enrollment: 27 (2022-2023)
- Student to teacher ratio: 3.00
- Website: www.kaufmanisd.net/o/gchs

Gary Campbell High School is a public alternative high school located in Kaufman, Texas (USA). It is part of the Kaufman Independent School District located in central Kaufman County and is classified by the National Center for Education Statistics as an "Other/alternative school".

As an alternative campus, Gary Campbell serves a small student population. For the 2024–2025 school year, the National Center for Education Statistics reported an enrollment of 13 students in grades 11–12, with 5.84 full-time equivalent teachers and a student-to-teacher ratio of 2.23. For 2022–2023, NCES reported 27 students and 9.00 FTE teachers, a ratio of 3.00.

In 2024, the school was rated by the Texas Education Agency as follows: 96 (A) overall, 96 (A) for Student Achievement, 86 (B) for School Progress, and Not Rated for Closing the Gaps. The campus is classified as an Alternative Education Campus and was evaluated under Alternative Education Accountability provisions. It was not identified for comprehensive support and improvement, targeted support and improvement, or additional targeted support, and it is not eligible for Distinction Designations.

According to the Texas Education Agency, the school's mobility rate was 88.0% for the 2021–22 school year, compared to 14.0% for the district and 16.8% for the state. A student is considered mobile if they are enrolled for less than 83% of the school year.
