= Oak Grove, Kaufman County, Texas =

Oak Grove, Texas
- Town
- Location of Oak Grove in Kaufman County, Texas
- Coordinates: 32°31′58″N 96°19′07″W
- Country: United States
- State: Texas
- County: Kaufman

Area
  - Total: 1.96 sq mi (5.08 km^{2})
  - Land: 1.96 sq mi (5.08 km^{2})
  - Water: 0 sq mi (0.00 km^{2})
- Elevation: 420 ft (130 m)

Population (2020)
  - Total: 617
  - Density: 315/sq mi (121/km^{2})
- Time zone: UTC-6 (Central (CST))
  - Summer (DST): UTC-5 (CDT)
- Area codes: 214, 469, 945, 972
- FIPS code: 48-52902
- GNIS feature ID: 2413062

Oak Grove is a town in Kaufman County, Texas, United States. The population was 617 at the 2020 census.

== Geography ==
Oak Grove is located in central Kaufman County 4 miles (6 km) south of Kaufman, the county seat.

According to the United States Census Bureau, the town has a total area of 2.2 square miles (5.6 km^{2}), all land.

== Demographics ==
Historical population
| Census | Pop. | Note | %± |
|---|---|---|---|
| 1980 | 319 | | — |
| 1990 | 557 | | 74.6% |
| 2000 | 710 | | 27.5% |
| 2010 | 603 | | −15.1% |
| 2020 | 617 | | 2.3% |
U.S. Decennial Census; 2020 Census

As of the census of 2000, there were 710 people, 258 households, and 224 families residing in the town. The population density was 336.4 inhabitants per square mile (129.9/km^{2}). There were 265 housing units at an average density of 125.6 per square mile (48.5/km^{2}). The racial makeup of the town was 96.20% White, 0.85% African American, 1.41% Asian, 0.70% from other races, and 0.85% from two or more races. Hispanic or Latino of any race were 3.38% of the population.

There were 258 households, out of which 36.8% had children under the age of 18 living with them, 80.6% were married couples living together, 4.7% had a female householder with no husband present, and 12.8% were non-families. 10.9% of all households were made up of individuals, and 4.7% had someone living alone who was 65 years of age or older. The average household size was 2.75 and the average family size was 2.98.

In the town, the population was spread out, with 25.8% under the age of 18, 4.6% from 18 to 24, 23.5% from 25 to 44, 31.1% from 45 to 64, and 14.9% who were 65 years of age or older. The median age was 43 years. For every 100 females, there were 92.4 males. For every 100 females age 18 and over, there were 91.6 males.

The median income for a household in the town was $65,938, and the median income for a family was $71,250. Males had a median income of $53,056 versus $33,056 for females. The per capita income for the town was $28,551. About 2.5% of families and 3.9% of the population were below the poverty line, including 2.0% of those under age 18 and 7.9% of those age 65 or over.

== Education ==
The city is served by the Kaufman Independent School District. The city is served by Phillips Elementary School, Nash Intermediate School, Norman Junior High School, and Kaufman High School. All Kaufman ISD schools are located in the city of Kaufman.
