= Roxana, Texas =

- Ghost town
- Interactive map of Roxana, Texas
- Coordinates: 35.6049°N 101.1217°W
- Country: United States
- State: Texas
- County: Carson
- Time zone: UTC-6 (CST)
  - Summer (DST): UTC-5 (CDT)

Roxana is a former oil boomtown and now a ghost town located in northeastern Carson County, in the Texas Panhandle, United States. Once a thriving oil camp during the 1920s, Roxana declined rapidly after the oil boom ended and is no longer an active community.

== History ==
Roxana emerged in the mid-1920s as the first and, for a time, the largest oil camp in Carson County following the discovery of a new oil pool in the region. The town was named after the Roxana Petroleum Company, whose drill brought in the first producing well in the area. The success of this well spurred rapid development, and by the height of the boom, fourteen rigs operated around the Roxana discovery site.

A post office was established on February 7, 1927, signaling Roxana’s growing permanence. Later that year, the Panhandle and Santa Fe Railway completed an oilfield branch line from White Deer, but the depot was located in the newly platted town of Skellytown. This decision prompted most Roxana businesses to relocate to Skellytown, though Roxana retained a small population and identity as an industrial village for several years.

By 1930, the effects of the Great Depression and the waning oil boom reduced Roxana to four businesses and a population of about ten. The post office closed in 1944, and mail service was transferred to Skellytown. Despite its decline, a few residents remained in Roxana until the late 1970s. Today, Roxana is classified as a ghost town, with no permanent population and only remnants of its oil camp era.

== Geography ==
Roxana was situated in the northeastern corner of Carson County, near the borders of Hutchinson and Gray counties, approximately 2.5 miles east of Skellytown. The site lies within the Great Plains region of the Texas Panhandle, characterized by flat terrain and semi-arid climate.

The approximate coordinates of Roxana are 35.6049°N 101.1217°W. The area is now largely rural, with agricultural land and oilfield infrastructure, including the Roxana electrical substation operated by Xcel Energy.

== Economy ==
During its peak in the 1920s, Roxana’s economy was driven entirely by oil production. The Roxana Petroleum Company’s initial strike attracted other operators, creating a cluster of drilling rigs and related businesses. However, the town’s fortunes were short-lived; when the railway depot was placed in Skellytown and oil activity slowed, Roxana’s economic base collapsed.

== Decline and current status ==
The decline of Roxana followed a common pattern among Texas oil boomtowns. After the initial surge of prosperity, the Great Depression and depletion of easily accessible oil reserves led to population loss. By the mid-20th century, Roxana was reduced to a handful of residents, and by the late 1970s, it was effectively abandoned. Today, Roxana is considered a ghost town, with no remaining businesses and only scattered remnants of its former structures.

== See also ==
- List of ghost towns in Texas
- Skellytown, Texas
- Texas oil boom
