= Buckholts Independent School District =

School district in Texas

Coordinates: 30.904°N 97.158°W

Buckholts Independent School District is a public school district based in Buckholts, Texas, United States. The district has one school that serves students in prekindergarten through grade 12.

== Academic achievement ==
In 2009, the school district was rated "academically acceptable" by the Texas Education Agency (TEA). Buckholts ISD's TEA accreditation was revoked in 2018.

== Special programs ==
=== Athletics ===
Buckholts High School plays six-man football.

== See also ==
- List of school districts in Texas
