= Buckholts High School =

Location
- 203 South 10th Street; Buckholts, Texas 76518-0248; United States; 30.871907°N 97.124800°W

Information
- School type: Public high school
- School district: Buckholts Independent School District
- Principal: Dr. Roland Quesada
- Staff: 16.26 (FTE)
- Grades: K-12
- Enrollment: 116 (2023-2024)
- Student to teacher ratio: 7.13
- Colors: Black & orange
- Athletics conference: UIL Class A
- Mascot: Badger
- Website: Buckholts High School

Buckholts High School or Buckholts School is a public high school located in Buckholts, Texas, USA. It is part of the Buckholts Independent School District located in northwestern Milam County and classified as a 1A school by the University Interscholastic League. In 2015, the school was rated "Improvement Required" by the Texas Education Agency.

== Athletics ==
The Buckholts Badgers compete in the following sports -

- Baseball
- Basketball
- Cross country
- 6-man football
- Track and field
- Volleyball
