= Umbarger, Texas =

Census-designated place in Randall County, Texas, United States

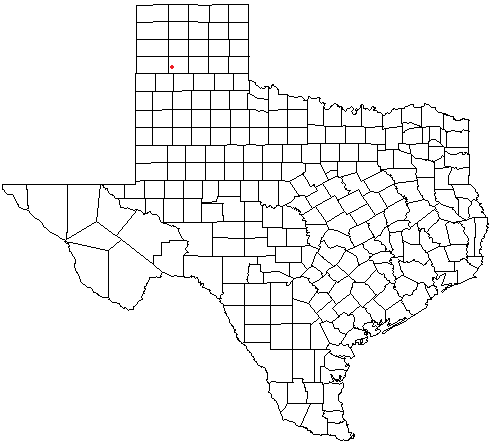
Location of Umbarger in the state of Texas

Umbarger (/ˈʌmbɑːrɡər/ UM-bar-gər) is a census-designated place in Randall County, Texas, United States. As of the 2020 census, Umbarger had a population of 123. The community is part of the Amarillo, Texas metropolitan statistical area.

== History ==
The origins of the community date back to the mid-1890s. In 1895, rancher S.G. Umbarger leased the site from the Houston and Great Northern Railroad survey lands. He purchased it two years later and established several businesses that catered to area settlers and travelers. The Panhandle and Santa Fe Railway established a switch near Umbarger's ranch in 1898. Although Umbarger sold his ranch and moved to nearby Canyon in 1900, the settlement retained its name.

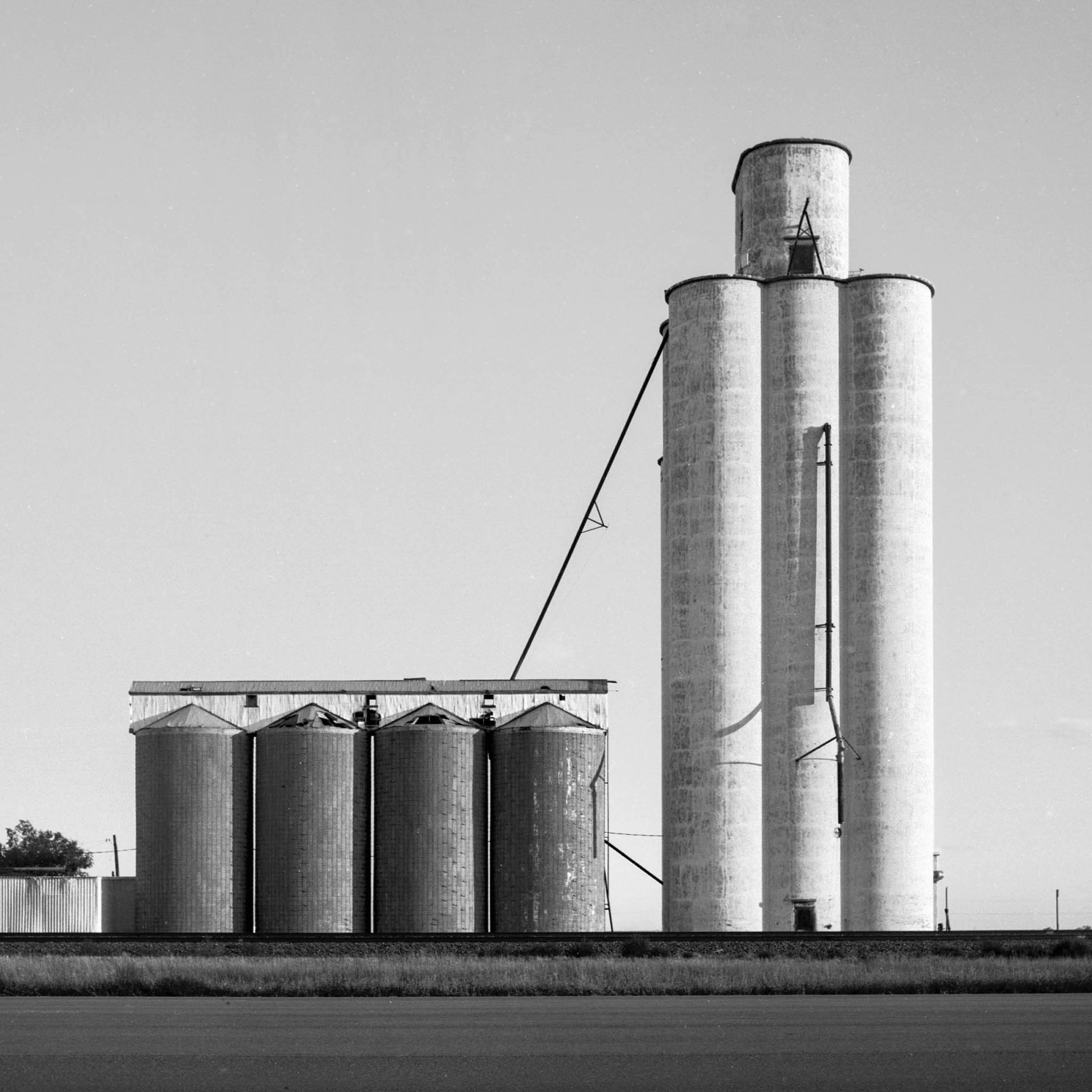
Grain elevator in Umbarger, November 2011

As more land was made available to homesteaders, the community slowly began to grow. In 1902, a group of German Catholics from the Schulenburg area in south-central Texas settled in Umbarger. The migration was pioneered by Pius Friemel. A general store that housed a post office opened soon after, followed by the creation of a public school district in 1904. Around the same time, a Catholic missionary, Father Joseph Reisdorff, worked to attract other German families to the community. In 1908, both John Hutson, an Englishman who had speculated in land holdings around Umbarger, and he filed separate plans of settlement. The subsequent friction led to the building of two separate Catholic churches. Swiss immigrants settled in Umbarger from 1911 to the late 1920s. By that time, the business district was centered in Reisdorff's portion of Umbarger on the north side of the railroad tracks. Under the leadership of Father John J. Dolje, St. Mary's Church was moved to its present location.

Eighty people lived in Umbarger in 1930. The population grew to 150 by 1940. Umbarger's public school district consolidated with Canyon's in 1964. Its location near Amarillo and Canyon and its proximity to Buffalo Lake have contributed to the survival and growth of the community. Although it remains unincorporated, Umbarger is home to over 300 residents, several businesses, and a functioning post office (zip code: 79091).

== Geography ==
Umbarger is located at 34°57′23″N 102°06′34″W. The community is situated along U.S. Highway 60 in west-central Randall County, about 10 miles southwest of Canyon and 26 miles southwest of Amarillo.

=== Climate ===
According to the Köppen climate classification, Umbarger has a semiarid climate, BSk on climate maps.

== Demographics ==
Historical population
Census	Pop.	Note	%±
2020	123		—
U.S. Decennial Census; 1850–1900 1910; 1920 1930 1940; 1950 1960 1970; 1980 1990 2000; 2010 2020

Umbarger first appeared as a census designated place in the 2020 U.S. census.

=== 2020 Census ===
Umbarger CDP, Texas – Racial and ethnic composition Note: the US Census treats Hispanic/Latino as an ethnic category. This table excludes Latinos from the racial categories and assigns them to a separate category. Hispanics/Latinos may be of any race.
Race / Ethnicity (NH = Non-Hispanic)	Pop 2020	% 2020
White alone (NH)	97	78.86%
Native American or Alaska Native alone (NH)	1	0.81%
Other race alone (NH)	2	1.63%
Mixed race or Multiracial (NH)	9	7.32%
Hispanic or Latino (any race)	14	11.38%
Total	123	100.00%

== Attractions ==
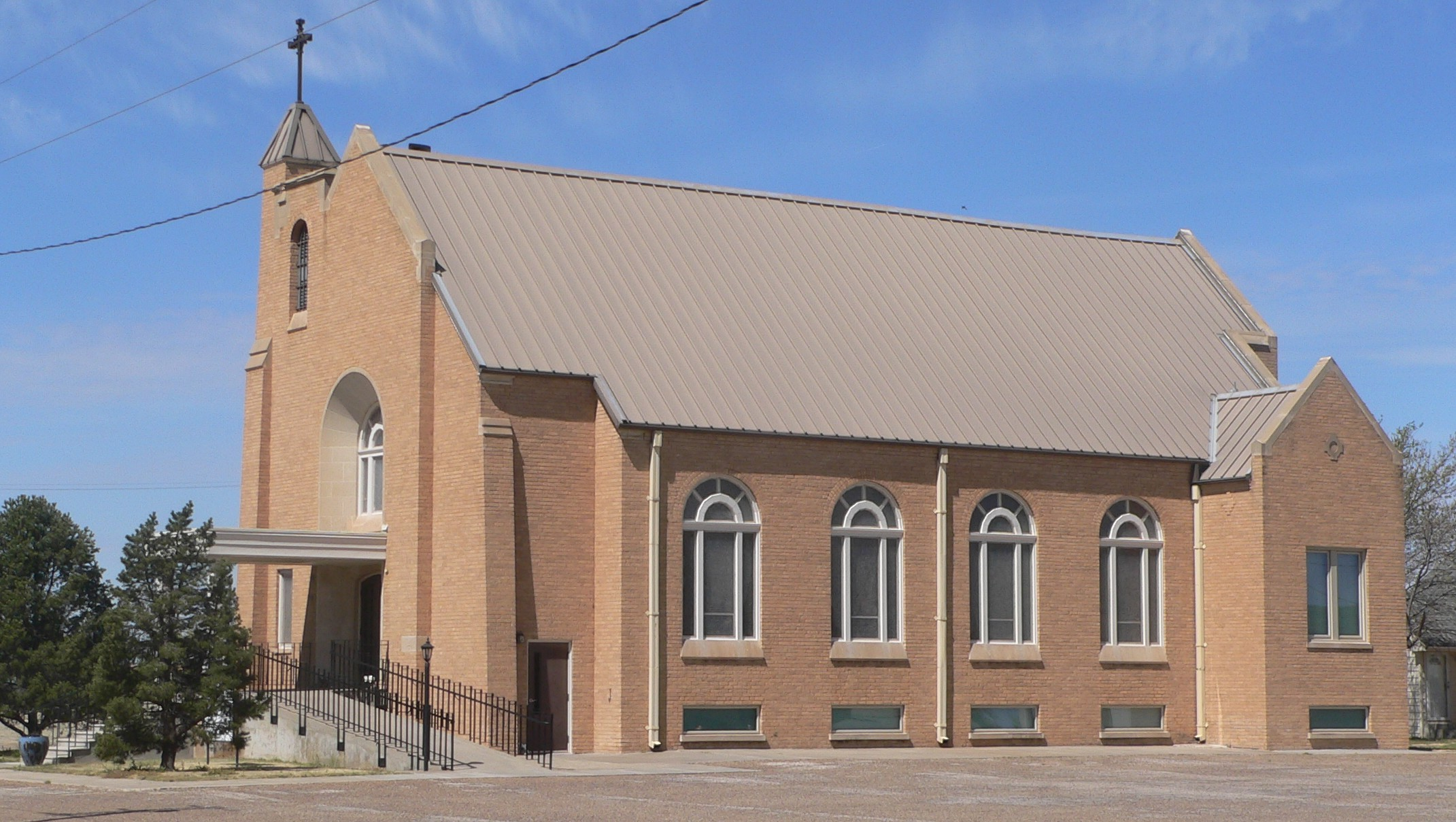
St. Mary's Church in Umbarger, April 2016

Each November, Umbarger hosts an annual German Sausage Festival at St. Mary's Parish Hall. St. Mary's Church features painted murals, wood carvings, and stained glass windows that were created by several Italian prisoners of war who were interned at the nearby Hereford Military Reservation and Reception Center during World War II. Dino Gambetti, one of the prisoners who created pieces for the church, went on to have a career as an artist in Italy, although he is probably better known for encouraging fellow prisoner Alberto Burri to become an artist. The community is located 3 miles north of Buffalo Lake and the Buffalo Lake National Wildlife Refuge.

== Education ==
Public education in the community of Umbarger is provided by the Canyon Independent School District. Students are zoned to Crestview Elementary School (kindergarten-grade 4), Canyon Intermediate School (grades 5-6), Canyon Junior High School (grades 7-8), and Canyon High School (grades 9-12).

== See also ==
- List of census-designated places in Texas
