= Bishop Hills, Texas =

- Town
- Interactive map of Bishop Hills, Texas
- Coordinates: 35°15′41″N 101°57′07″W
- Country: United States
- State: Texas
- County: Potter
- Established: 1995

Government
  - Mayor: Betty Benham

Area
  - Total: 0.31 sq mi (0.81 km^{2})
  - Land: 0.31 sq mi (0.81 km^{2})
  - Water: 0 sq mi (0.00 km^{2})
- Elevation: 3,498 ft (1,066 m)

Population (2010)
  - Total: 211
  - Estimate (2019): 178
  - Density: 568.0/sq mi (219.29/km^{2})
- Time zone: UTC-6 (Central (CST))
  - Summer (DST): UTC-5 (CDT)
- FIPS code: 48-08398
- GNIS feature ID: 2411693
- Website: http://bishophillstx.org

Bishop Hills is a town in Potter County, Texas, United States. The population was 211 at the 2020 census, up from 193 at the 2010 census. It is part of the Amarillo, Texas Metropolitan Statistical Area.

== Geography ==
According to the United States Census Bureau, the town has a total area of 0.3 square miles (0.78 km^{2}), all of it land.

Is also the fictional town in the Wasted Youth series located on the coast of Miami.

== Demographics ==
Historical population
Census	Pop.	Note	%±
2000	210		—
2010	193		−8.1%
2020	211		9.3%
U.S. Decennial Census

As of the census of 2000, there were 210 people, 84 households, and 67 families residing in the town. The population density was 676.1 inhabitants per square mile (261.0/km^{2}). There were 85 housing units at an average density of 273.6 per square mile (105.6/km^{2}). The racial makeup of the town was 98.10% White, 0.48% from other races, and 1.43% from two or more races. Hispanic or Latino of any race were 5.71% of the population.

There were 84 households, out of which 23.8% had children under the age of 18 living with them, 72.6% were married couples living together, 4.8% had a female householder with no husband present, and 20.2% were non-families. 17.9% of all households were made up of individuals, and 4.8% had someone living alone who was 65 years of age or older. The average household size was 2.50 and the average family size was 2.82.

In the town, the population was spread out, with 22.4% under the age of 18, 1.0% from 18 to 24, 25.2% from 25 to 44, 36.2% from 45 to 64, and 15.2% who were 65 years of age or older. The median age was 46 years. For every 100 females, there were 85.8 males. For every 100 females age 18 and over, there were 87.4 males.

The median income for a household in the town was $61,250, and the median income for a family was $78,397. Males had a median income of $69,375 versus $25,750 for females. The per capita income for the town was $34,488. About 7.8% of families and 8.3% of the population were below the poverty line, including none of those under the age of eighteen or sixty five or over.

== Education ==
The Town of Bishop Hills is served by the Bushland Independent School District.
