= Buckholts, Texas =

- Town
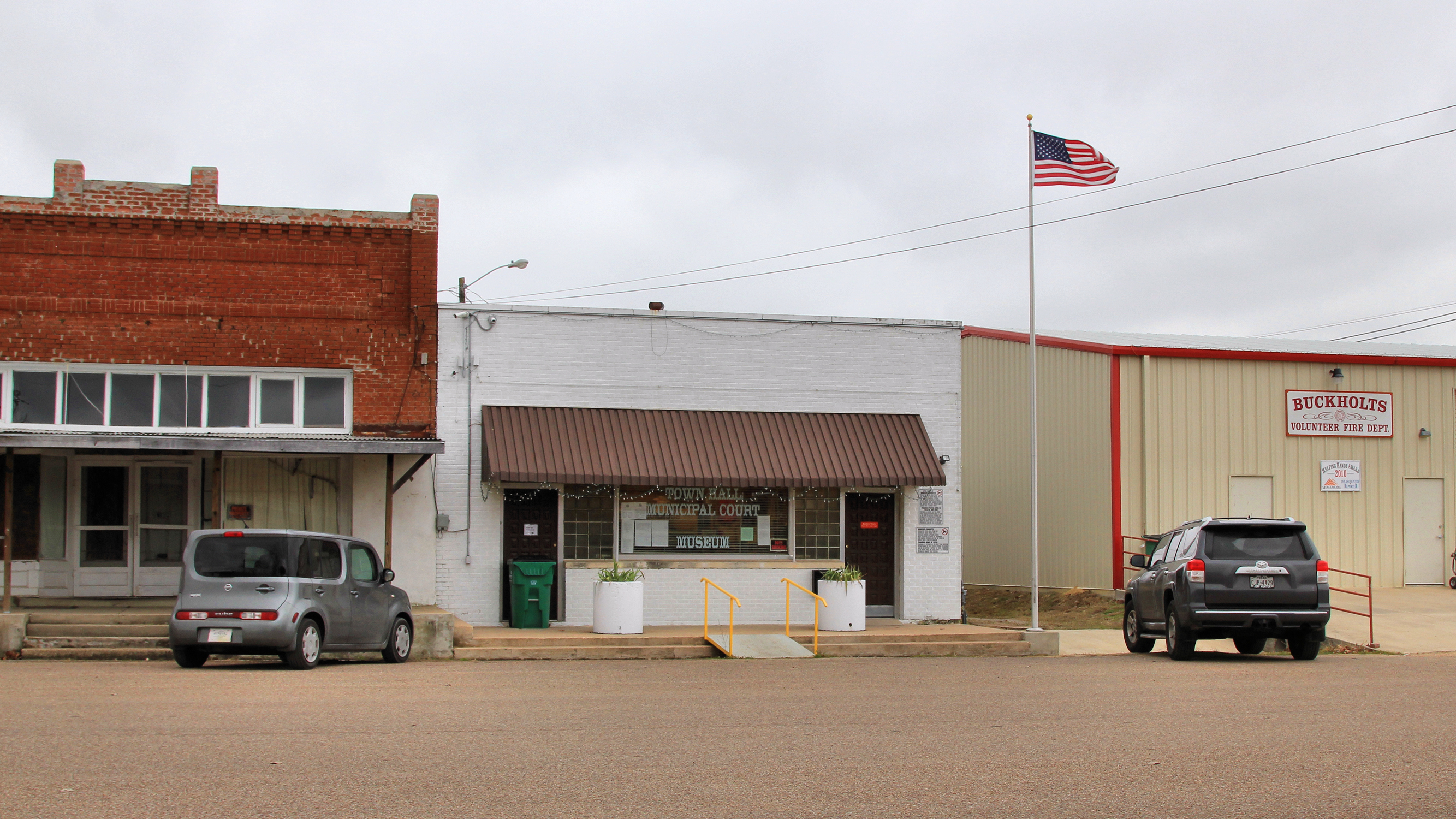
- Buckholts Town Hall
- Interactive map of Buckholts, Texas
- Coordinates: 30°52′26″N 97°7′30″W
- Country: United States
- State: Texas
- County: Milam
- Established: 1881

Area
  - Total: 1.36 sq mi (3.52 km^{2})
  - Land: 1.36 sq mi (3.52 km^{2})
  - Water: 0 sq mi (0.00 km^{2})
- Elevation: 522 ft (159 m)

Population (2020)
  - Total: 365
  - Density: 269/sq mi (104/km^{2})
- Time zone: UTC-6 (Central (CST))
  - Summer (DST): UTC-5 (CDT)
- ZIP code: 76518
- Area code: 254
- FIPS code: 48-11020
- GNIS feature ID: 1353150
- Website: buckholtstx.myruralwater.com

Buckholts is a town in Milam County, Texas, United States. Its population was 365 at the 2020 census.

== History ==
Buckholts was established in 1881 when the Gulf, Colorado and Santa Fe Railway was built through the area. It was named for John Abel Buckholts, a Texas state legislator and Mexican–American War veteran. A post office was opened in 1882 and by 1884 the town had a population of 61. A school was built in 1896, which served 85 students by 1903. The population of the town increased to 182 in 1900 and further increased to 800 over the next few decades before declining after the 1960s.

Buckholts was officially incorporated in 1975, having been an unincorporated community since its establishment.

The Buckholts Police Department disbanded in July 2026 after a Texas Commission on Law Enforcement investigation revealed that the department failed multiple safety inspections.

== Geography ==
According to the United States Census Bureau, the town has a total area of 1.3 sq mi (3.4 km^{2}), all land.

== Demographics ==
Historical population
Census	Pop.	Note	%±
1980	388		—
1990	335		−13.7%
2000	387		15.5%
2010	515		33.1%
2020	365		−29.1%
U.S. Decennial Census; 2020 Census

At the 2000 census, 387 people, 145 households, and 102 families were residing in the town. The population density was 291.7 people/sq mi (112.3/km^{2}). The 166 housing units averaged 125.1/sq mi (48.2/km^{2}). The racial makeup was 83.46% White, 1.81% African American, 0.52% Native American, 12.92% from other races, and 1.29% from two or more races. Hispanics or Latinos of any race were 35.66% of the population.

Of the 145 households, 32.4% had children under 18 living with them, 56.6% were married couples living together, 8.3% had a female householder with no husband present, and 29.0% were not families. About 26.2% of all households were made up of individuals, and 20.0% had someone living alone who was 65 or older. The average household size was 2.67, and the average family size was 3.24.

In the town, the age distribution was 28.2% under 18, 8.8% from 18 to 24, 25.8% from 25 to 44, 18.1% from 45 to 64, and 19.1% at 65 or older. The median age was 35 years. For every 100 females, there were 90.6 males. For every 100 females age 18 and over, there were 95.8 males.

The median household income was $31,563 and the median family income was $36,875. Males had a median income of $31,458 and females $19,375. The per capita income was $13,102. About 16.8% of families and 17.1% of the population were below the poverty line, including 17.4% of those under age 18 and 23.3% of those age 65 or over.

== Education ==
The town of Buckholts is served by the Buckholts Independent School District, the location of Buckholts High School.
