= Post Oak Bend, Texas =

- Town
- Location of Post Oak Bend City in Kaufman County, Texas
- Coordinates: 32°37′36″N 96°19′25″W
- Country: United States
- State: Texas
- County: Kaufman

Government
  - Type: Mayor - Council

Area
  - Total: 2.05 sq mi (5.31 km^{2})
  - Land: 2.05 sq mi (5.30 km^{2})
  - Water: 0.0039 sq mi (0.01 km^{2})
- Elevation: 459 ft (140 m)

Population (2020)
  - Total: 683
  - Density: 334/sq mi (129/km^{2})
- Time zone: UTC-6 (Central (CST))
  - Summer (DST): UTC-5 (CDT)
- FIPS code: 48-59066
- GNIS feature ID: 2412501
- Website: www.postoakbend.org

Post Oak Bend is a town in Kaufman County, Texas, United States. Its population was 683 in 2020.

== Geography ==
Post Oak Bend is located in central Kaufman County. It is 3 miles (5 km) north of Kaufman, the county seat, and 9 miles (14 km) south of Terrell.

According to the United States Census Bureau, the town has a total area of 2.0 square miles (5.2 km^{2}), of which 2.4 acres (1.0 ha), or 0.18%, are covered by water.

== Demographics ==
Historical population
Census	Pop.	Note	%±
1980	266		—
1990	264		−0.8%
2000	404		53.0%
2010	595		47.3%
2020	683		14.8%
U.S. Decennial Census

Post Oak Bend City racial composition as of 2020 (NH = Non-Hispanic) (Note: Note: the US Census treats Hispanic/Latino as an ethnic category. This table excludes Latinos from the racial categories and assigns them to a separate category. Hispanics/Latinos can be of any race.)
Race	Number	Percentage
White (NH)	550	80.53%
Black or African American (NH)	13	1.9%
Native American or Alaska Native (NH)	8	1.17%
Asian (NH)	7	1.02%
Pacific Islander (NH)	1	0.15%
Mixed/multiracial (NH)	27	3.95%
Hispanic or Latino	77	11.27%
Total	683	

As of the 2020 United States census, 683 people, 174 households, and 138 families resided in the town.

== Education ==
Post Oak Bend is served by Kaufman Independent School District. The Kaufman ISD schools are in the city of Kaufman.
