= Lake Tanglewood, Texas =

- Village
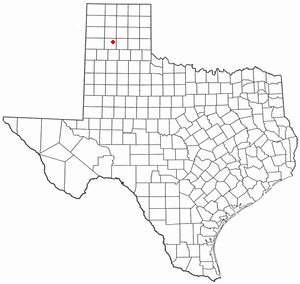
- Location of Lake Tanglewood, Texas

- Coordinates: 35°03′25″N 101°46′54″W
- Country: United States
- State: Texas
- County: Randall

Area
  - Total: 1.50 sq mi (3.89 km^{2})
  - Land: 1.12 sq mi (2.91 km^{2})
  - Water: 0.38 sq mi (0.98 km^{2})
- Elevation: 3,386 ft (1,032 m)

Population (2010)
  - Total: 796
  - Estimate (2019): 886
  - Density: 788.3/sq mi (304.38/km^{2})
- Time zone: UTC-6 (Central (CST))
  - Summer (DST): UTC-5 (CDT)
- FIPS code: 48-40804
- GNIS feature ID: 2413565

Lake Tanglewood is a village in Randall County, Texas, United States. As of the 2020 census, Lake Tanglewood had a population of 686. It is part of the Amarillo, Texas, metropolitan statistical area.

== Geography ==
According to the United States Census Bureau, the village has a total area of 1.5 square miles (3.9 km^{2}), of which 0.4 square miles (1.0 km^{2}) (27.4%) is covered by water. It sits beside the lake of the same name, a reservoir on the Prairie Dog Town Fork Red River.

== Demographics ==
Historical population
Census	Pop.	Note	%±
1980	485		—
1990	637		31.3%
2000	825		29.5%
2010	796		−3.5%
2020	686		−13.8%
U.S. Decennial Census

=== 2020 census ===
Lake Tanglewood racial composition (NH = Non-Hispanic) (Note: Note: the US Census treats Hispanic/Latino as an ethnic category. This table excludes Latinos from the racial categories and assigns them to a separate category. Hispanics/Latinos can be of any race.)
Race	Number	Percentage
White (NH)	616	89.8%
Black or African American (NH)	1	0.15%
Native American or Alaska Native (NH)	3	0.44%
Asian (NH)	5	0.73%
Pacific Islander (NH)	1	0.15%
Some other race (NH)	4	0.58%
Multiracial (NH)	13	1.9%
Hispanic or Latino	43	6.27%
Total	686	

As of the 2020 United States census, 686 people, 318 households, and 243 families resided in the village.

=== 2000 census ===
As of the census of 2000, there were 825 people, 342 households, and 282 families residing in the village. The population density was 777.4 inhabitants per square mile (300.2/km^{2}). There were 402 housing units at an average density of 378.8 per square mile (146.3/km^{2}). The racial makeup of the village was 98.06% White, 0.73% Native American, 0.12% Pacific Islander, 0.36% from other races, and 0.73% from two or more races. Hispanics or Latinos of any race were 1.94% of the population.

Of the 342 households, 24.6% had children under 18 living with them, 78.7% were married couples living together, 2.3% had a female householder with no husband present, and 17.5% were not families. About 14.0% of all households were made up of individuals, and 6.1% had someone living alone who was 65 or older. The average household size was 2.41 and the average family size was 2.66.

In the village, the age distribution was 17.8% under 18, 5.5% from 18 to 24, 19.4% from 25 to 44, 39.9% from 45 to 64, and 17.5% who were 65 or older. The median age was 49 years. For every 100 females there were 102.7 males. For every 100 females and over, there were 99.4 males.

The median income for a household in the village was $67,344 and for a family was $76,641. Males had a median income of $61,944 versus $30,938 for females. The per capita income for the village was $38,159. About 5.5% of families and 6.2% of the population were below the poverty line, including 9.7% of those under 18 and 4.8% of those 65 or over.
