= Skellytown, Texas =

- Town
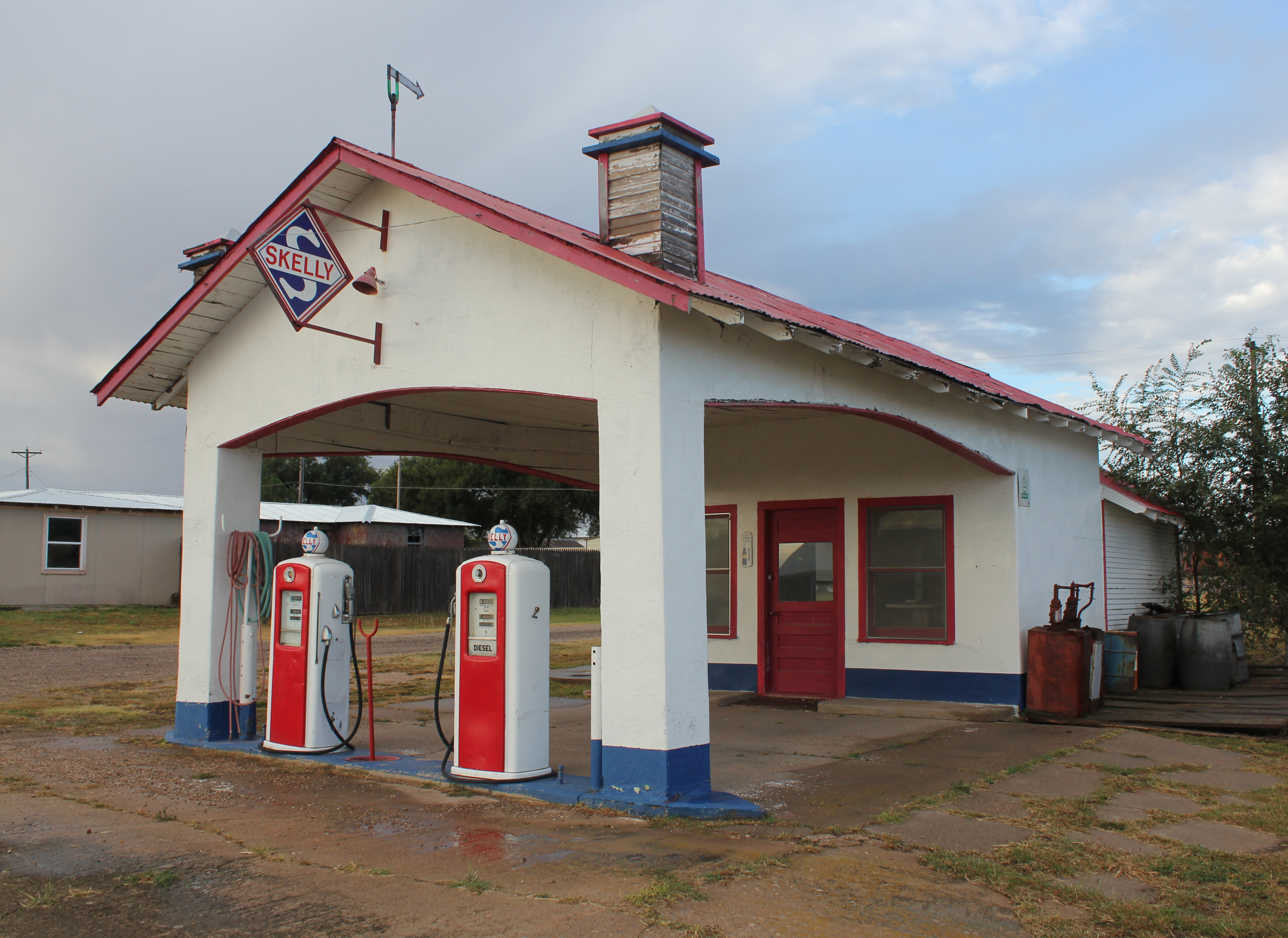
- A restored Skelly filling station on Main Street in Skellytown.

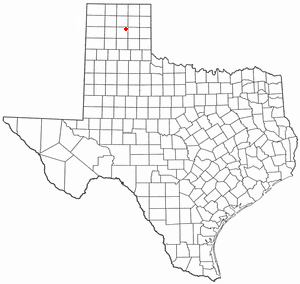
- Location of Skellytown, Texas

- Coordinates: 35°34′16″N 101°10′23″W
- Country: United States
- State: Texas
- County: Carson

Government
  - Type: Mayor–Council
  - City Council: Mayor Amanda Dickerson; Mayor Pro-Tem Cameron Davis; Marcy Ruth Reva Williams; Sherry Miles
  - City Secretary: Valarie Ball

Area
  - Total: 0.53 sq mi (1.37 km^{2})
  - Land: 0.53 sq mi (1.37 km^{2})
  - Water: 0 sq mi (0.00 km^{2})
- Elevation: 3,281 ft (1,000 m)

Population (2020)
  - Total: 394
  - Density: 745/sq mi (288/km^{2})
- Time zone: UTC-6 (Central (CST))
  - Summer (DST): UTC-5 (CDT)
- ZIP code: 79080
- Area code: 806
- FIPS code: 48-68120
- GNIS feature ID: 2413293
- Website: www.skellytowntexas.com

Skellytown is a town in Carson County, Texas, United States. Its population was 394 at the 2020 census, down from 473 at the 2010 census. Located in the Texas Panhandle, it is part of the Amarillo metropolitan area. In 1926, Skelly Oil Company purchased a 320-acre (130 ha) lease from Henry Schafer, a local rancher on whose land the Roxana oil pool was located. Schafer platted a new townsite, which he named "Skelly" in honor of the company's founder and president, William Grove Skelly of Tulsa, Oklahoma.

== History ==
Skelly was sited between the oil boom camps of Roxana, which was north of Skelly, and Noelette, which was east. The first businesses were company-owned supply stores. Residents had to gather wood for fuel and rely on trucked-in water supplies.

The Panhandle and Santa Fe Railway built a branch line north in 1927, from White Deer to the oilfields, and established its depot at a site just north of Skelly. All three camps moved their businesses to the new site and formed the Skellytown Townsite Company. Four months later, Skellytown had two oil refineries, a carbon black -manufacturing plant, and about 100 oil wells operating in its vicinity. Also in 1927, a new post office opened, the Roxana-Skellytown News began publishing every week, Panhandle Power and Light began to provide utilities, and a four-room emergency hospital opened.

== Geography ==
Skellytown is located in northeastern Carson County just northeast of Texas State Highway 152, which leads northwest 14 miles (23 km) to Borger and southeast 13 miles (21 km) to Pampa.

According to the United States Census Bureau, Skellytown has a total area of 0.54 square miles (1.4 km^{2}), all land.

=== Climate ===
According to the Köppen climate classification, Skellytown has a semiarid climate, BSk on climate maps.

== Demographics ==
Historical population
Census	Pop.	Note	%±
1960	967		—
1970	716		−26.0%
1980	899		25.6%
1990	664		−26.1%
2000	610		−8.1%
2010	473		−22.5%
2020	394		−16.7%
U.S. Decennial Census

As of the census of 2000, 610 people, 237 households, and 182 families were residing in the town. The population density was 1,416.5 people/sq mi (547.7/km^{2}). The 283 housing units had an average density of 657.2/sq mi (254.1/km^{2}). The racial makeup of the town was 93.93% White, 0.33% African American, 2.95% Native American, 0.16% Asian, 1.80% from other races, and 0.82% from two or more races. Hispanics or Latinos of any race were 4.75% of the population.

Of the 237 households, 35.9% had children under 18 living with them, 64.1% were married couples living together, 9.3% had a female householder with no husband present, and 23.2% were not families. About 21.1% of all households were made up of individuals, and 10.1% had someone living alone who was 65 or older. The average household size was 2.57, and the average family size was 2.99.

In the town, the age distribution was 26.6% under 18, 7.9% from 18 to 24, 22.5% from 25 to 44, 25.7% from 45 to 64, and 17.4% who were 65 or older. The median age was 42 years. For every 100 females, there were 94.3 males. For every 100 females age 18 and over, there were 91.5 males.

The median income for a household in the town was $31,771, and for a family was $37,667. Males had a median income of $31,250 versus $18,750 for females. The per capita income for the town was $15,087. About 15.3% of families and 14.5% of the population were below the poverty line, including 18.1% of those under age 18 and 8.5% of those age 65 or over.
