= Palisades, Texas =

- Village
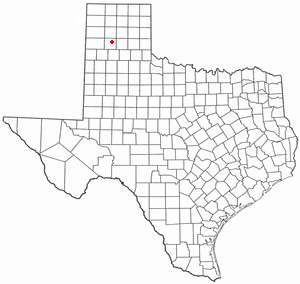
- Location of Palisades, Texas

- Coordinates: 35°03′41″N 101°48′12″W
- Country: United States
- State: Texas
- County: Randall

Area
  - Total: 0.58 sq mi (1.50 km^{2})
  - Land: 0.56 sq mi (1.45 km^{2})
  - Water: 0.019 sq mi (0.05 km^{2})
- Elevation: 3,409 ft (1,039 m)

Population (2010)
  - Total: 325
  - Estimate (2019): 353
  - Density: 628.7/sq mi (242.73/km^{2})
- Time zone: UTC-6 (Central (CST))
  - Summer (DST): UTC-5 (CDT)
- FIPS code: 48-54726
- GNIS feature ID: 2413575
- Website: www.villageofpalisades.com

Palisades is a village in Randall County, Texas, United States. As of the 2020 census, Palisades had a population of 268. It is part of the Amarillo, Texas Metropolitan Statistical Area.

== Geography ==
According to the United States Census Bureau, the village has a total area of 0.6 square miles (1.6 km^{2}), all land.

== Demographics ==
Historical population
Census	Pop.	Note	%±
2000	352		—
2010	325		−7.7%
2020	268		−17.5%
U.S. Decennial Census

=== 2020 census ===
Palisades racial composition (NH = Non-Hispanic) (Note: Note: the US Census treats Hispanic/Latino as an ethnic category. This table excludes Latinos from the racial categories and assigns them to a separate category. Hispanics/Latinos can be of any race.)
Race	Number	Percentage
White (NH)	214	79.85%
Native American or Alaska Native (NH)	4	1.49%
Asian (NH)	1	0.37%
Mixed/Multi-Racial (NH)	18	6.72%
Hispanic or Latino	31	11.57%
Total	268	

As of the 2020 United States census, there were 268 people, 145 households, and 87 families residing in the village.

=== 2000 census ===
As of the census of 2000, there were 352 people, 144 households, and 98 families residing in the village. The population density was 610.6 inhabitants per square mile (235.8/km^{2}). There were 157 housing units at an average density of 272.3 per square mile (105.1/km^{2}). The racial makeup of the village was 95.74% White, 2.27% Native American, 1.14% from other races, and 0.85% from two or more races. Hispanic or Latino of any race were 3.12% of the population.

There were 144 households, out of which 35.4% had children under the age of 18 living with them, 55.6% were married couples living together, 8.3% had a female householder with no husband present, and 31.9% were non-families. 29.2% of all households were made up of individuals, and 7.6% had someone living alone who was 65 years of age or older. The average household size was 2.44 and the average family size was 2.95.

In the village, the age distribution of the population shows 27.0% under the age of 18, 8.0% from 18 to 24, 27.8% from 25 to 44, 25.3% from 45 to 64, and 11.9% who were 65 years of age or older. The median age was 39 years. For every 100 females, there were 116.0 males. For every 100 females age 18 and over, there were 117.8 males.

The median income for a household in the village was $32,188, and the median income for a family was $38,125. Males had a median income of $33,125 versus $17,083 for females. The per capita income for the village was $17,011. About 8.6% of families and 9.2% of the population were below the poverty line, including 11.2% of those under age 18 and 4.4% of those age 65 or over.
