= Timbercreek Canyon, Texas =

- Village
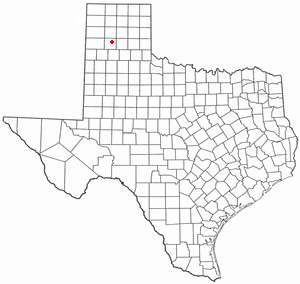
- Location of Timbercreek Canyon, Texas

- Coordinates: 35°03′14″N 101°49′07″W
- Country: United States
- State: Texas
- County: Randall

Area
  - Total: 1.91 sq mi (4.95 km^{2})
  - Land: 1.91 sq mi (4.94 km^{2})
  - Water: 0.0039 sq mi (0.01 km^{2})
- Elevation: 3,514 ft (1,071 m)

Population (2010)
  - Total: 418
  - Estimate (2019): 471
  - Density: 247.0/sq mi (95.36/km^{2})
- Time zone: UTC-6 (Central (CST))
  - Summer (DST): UTC-5 (CDT)
- FIPS code: 48-73030
- GNIS feature ID: 2413594

Timbercreek Canyon is a village in Randall County, Texas, United States. As of the 2020 census, Timbercreek Canyon had a population of 430. It is part of the Amarillo, Texas Metropolitan Statistical Area.

== Geography ==
According to the United States Census Bureau, the village has a total area of 1.8 square miles (4.7 km^{2}), all land.

== Demographics ==
Historical population
Census	Pop.	Note	%±
1990	277		—
2000	406		46.6%
2010	418		3.0%
2020	430		2.9%
U.S. Decennial Census

=== 2020 census ===
Timbercreek Canyon racial composition (NH = Non-Hispanic) (Note: Note: the US Census treats Hispanic/Latino as an ethnic category. This table excludes Latinos from the racial categories and assigns them to a separate category. Hispanics/Latinos can be of any race.)
Race	Number	Percentage
White (NH)	362	84.19%
Black or African American (NH)	6	1.4%
Native American or Alaska Native (NH)	1	0.23%
Asian (NH)	2	0.47%
Mixed/Multi-Racial (NH)	19	4.42%
Hispanic or Latino	40	9.3%
Total	430	

As of the 2020 United States census, there were 430 people, 210 households, and 176 families residing in the village.

=== 2000 census ===
As of the census of 2000, there were 406 people, 149 households, and 141 families residing in the village. The population density was 220.9 inhabitants per square mile (85.3/km^{2}). There were 158 housing units at an average density of 86.0 per square mile (33.2/km^{2}). The racial makeup of the village was 94.09% White, 0.25% Native American, 1.23% Asian, 2.96% from other races, and 1.48% from two or more races. Hispanic or Latino of any race were 5.17% of the population.

There were 149 households, out of which 38.3% had children under the age of 18 living with them, 84.6% were married couples living together, 8.1% had a female householder with no husband present, and 4.7% were non-families. 4.0% of all households were made up of individuals, and 1.3% had someone living alone who was 65 years of age or older. The average household size was 2.72 and the average family size was 2.80.

In the village, the age distribution of the population shows 25.4% under the age of 18, 5.7% from 18 to 24, 24.4% from 25 to 44, 35.7% from 45 to 64, and 8.9% who were 65 years of age or older. The median age was 43 years. For every 100 females, there were 98.0 males. For every 100 females age 18 and over, there were 94.2 males.

The median income for a household in the village was $80,758, and the median income for a family was $82,991. Males had a median income of $51,538 versus $33,125 for females. The per capita income for the village was $32,036. About 2.1% of families and 1.2% of the population were below the poverty line, including none of those under the age of eighteen or sixty-five or over.
