= Kaufman High School =

Public school in Texas, United States

Location
- 3205 S. Houston St. Kaufman, Texas 75142-2298; United States; 32.5657°N 96.3153°W

Information
- School type: Public high school
- School district: Kaufman Independent School District
- Principal: Dr. Matthew Nichols
- Staff: 87.66 (FTE)
- Grades: 9-12
- Enrollment: 1,321 (2023-2024)
- Student to teacher ratio: 15.07
- Colors: Black & Vegas Gold
- Athletics conference: UIL Class AAAA
- Mascot: Lions
- Website: www.kaufmanisd.net/o/khs

Kaufman High School is a public high school located in Kaufman, Texas (USA) and classified as a 5A school by the UIL. It is part of the Kaufman Independent School District located in central Kaufman County.

In 2022–23, the school was rated by the Texas Education Agency as follows: 94 (A) overall, 91 (A) for Student Achievement, 93 (A) for School Progress, and 95 (A) for Closing the Gaps. It also was designated with distinction in Academic Achievement in Reading/Language Arts, Academic Achievement in Mathematics, Academic Achievement in Science, Top 25%: Comparative Academic Growth, Postsecondary Readiness, and Top 25%: Comparative Closing the Gaps.

== Athletics ==
The Kaufman Lions compete in the following sports Cross Country, Volleyball, Football, Basketball, Powerlifting, Soccer, Golf, Tennis, Track, Softball & Baseball

The Kaufman XC teams have won 9 of the last 16 Regional Championships.

=== State Titles ===
Kaufman (UIL)

- Boys Cross Country
  - 2011(3A)

Kaufman Pyle (PVIL)

- Boys Track
  - 1965(PVIL-1A), 1966(PVIL-1A)
