= Tulia =

Topics referred to by the same term

Tulia may refer to:

== People ==
- Tulia Ackson (born 1976), Speaker of the National Assembly of Tanzania
- Tulia Ciámpoli (1915–1981), Argentine actress, dancer, and violinist
- Tulia Medina (born 1983), Colombian weightlifter

== Other ==
- Tulia (band), a Polish folk music group
- Tulia High School, a public high school located in Tulia, Texas
- Tulia, Texas, a city in, and county seat of, Swisher County, Texas
