= Love, Swisher County, Texas =

Love
- unincorporated community
- Location within Texas
- Coordinates: 34°32′23″N 101°34′32″W
- Country: United States
- State: Texas
- Counties: Swisher
- Elevation: 3,356 ft (1,023 m)
- Time zone: UTC-6 (Central (CST))
  - Summer (DST): UTC-5 (CDT)
- GNIS feature ID: 1361873

Love is an unincorporated community in Swisher County, Texas, United States.

Love is located 11 miles (18 km) east of Tulia on Farm to Market Road 1318, and 3.4 miles (5 km) north of Tule Creek. A scenic backroad leads from Happy to Love.

George E. Love was an early settler who in 1890 provided land for the establishment of one of the county's first schools. "Love School" was central to many of this rural community's activities, including church services, Sunday school, and community gatherings.
