= Happy High School =

Location
- 500 NW 3rd Street; Happy, Texas 79042-0458; United States; 34°44′46″N 101°51′39″W

Information
- School type: Public High School
- School district: Happy Independent School District
- Principal: Jennifer Sperry
- Teaching staff: 17.19 (FTE)
- Grades: 7-12
- Enrollment: 130 (2023–2024)
- Student to teacher ratio: 7.56
- Colors: Black & Gold
- Athletics conference: UIL Class A
- Nickname: Cowboy/Cowgirl
- Website: Happy High School

Happy High School is a public high school located in Happy, Texas (USA) and classified as a 1A school by the UIL It is part of the Happy Independent School District located in northern Swisher County. In 2013, the school was rated "Met Standard" by the Texas Education Agency.

== Demographics ==
The demographic breakdown of the 131 students enrolled for the 2022–2023 school year is as follows:

- Male - 55.7%
- Female - 44.3%
- Hispanic - 19.1%
- White - 77.9%
- Black - 0.8%
- Two or More Races - 2.3%

According to the NCES, these are the only racial groups represented at this school.

== Athletics ==
The Happy Cowboys compete in the following sports

Cross Country, 6-Man Football, Basketball, Golf, Tennis & Track, and High School Rodeo.

=== State Titles ===
- One Act Play
  - 1969(1A)

== Notable alumni ==
- Joe Fortenberry, captain of the 1936 United States men's Olympic basketball team. Fortenberry is credited as being one of the first basketball players to dunk the ball, doing so at Madison Square Garden in 1936
