= Kress High School =

Public school in Texas, United States

Coordinates: 34.3635°N 101.7462°W

Location
- 200 E Fifth Street; Kress, Texas 79052-0970; United States

Information
- School type: Public High School
- School district: Kress Independent School District
- Principal: Leah Zeigler
- Teaching staff: 14.57 (FTE)
- Grades: 7-12
- Enrollment: 130 (2023–2024)
- Student to teacher ratio: 8.92
- Colors: Black & Gold
- Athletics conference: UIL Class A
- Mascot: Kangaroo
- Website: Kress High School

Kress High School is a public high school located in Kress, Texas (USA) and classified as a 1A school by the UIL. It is part of the Kress Independent School District located in southern Swisher County. In 2013, the school was rated "Met Standard" by the Texas Education Agency.

== Athletics ==
The Kress Kangaroos compete in the following sports:

- 6-Man Football,
- Baseball
- Basketball
- Golf
- Tennis
- Track
