= Carlander =

Carlander is a surname. Notable people with the surname include:

- Guy Anton Carlander (1888–1975), American architect
- Wayne Carlander, American basketball player
