= Kress Independent School District =

School district in Texas

Coordinates: 34.3635°N 101.7460°W

Kress Independent School District is a public school district based in Kress, Texas (USA) that serves students in southern Swisher County.

== Schools ==
The district has two campuses -

- Kress High/Junior High School (Grades 7-12)
- Kress Elementary (Grades PK-6)

In 2009, the school district was rated "academically acceptable" by the Texas Education Agency.
