= Fisk Medical Arts Building =

Historic tower block in Texas, US

- U.S. National Register of Historic Places
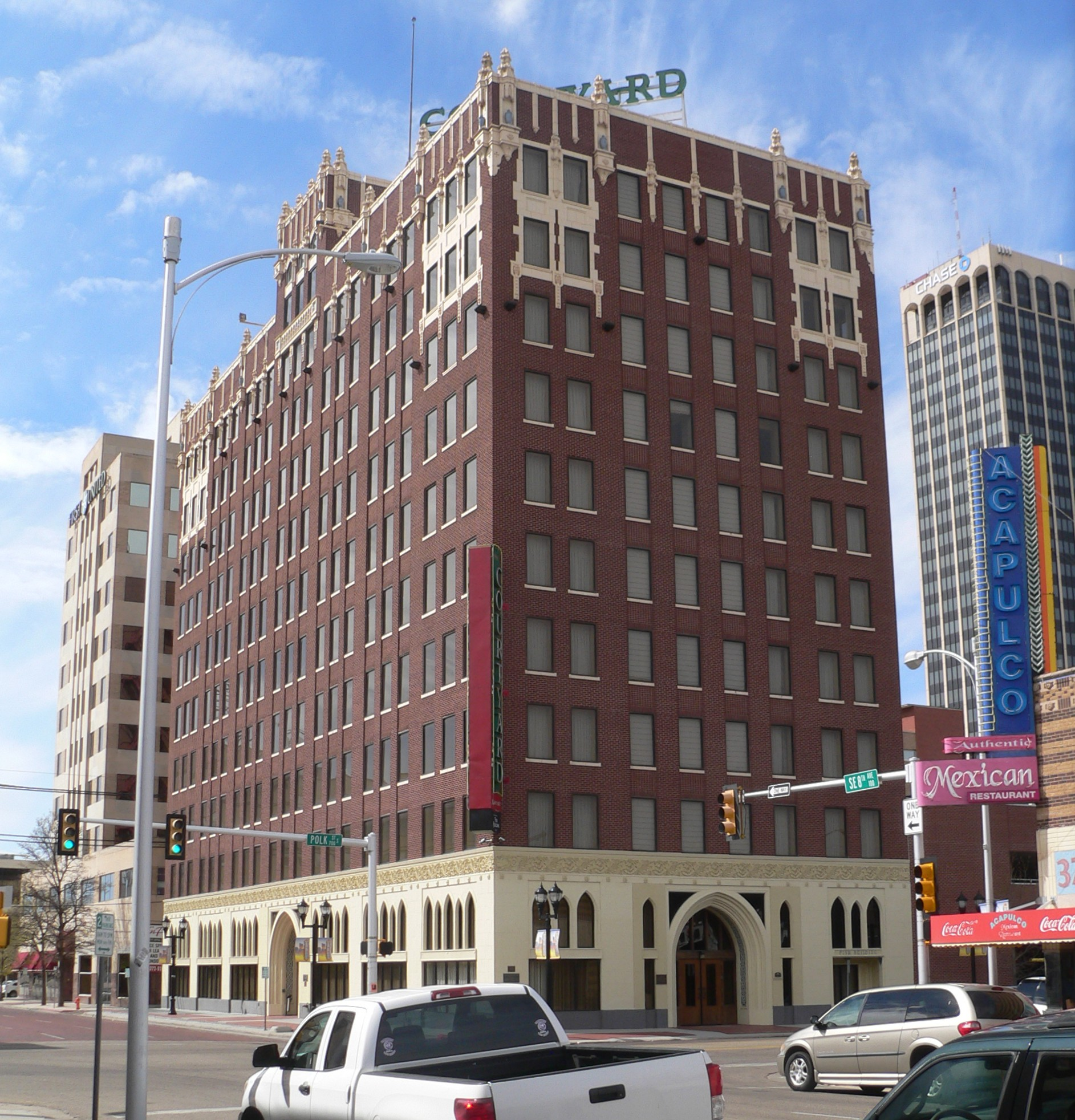
- The Fisk Medical Arts Building in 2016

- Location within Texas
- Location: Amarillo, Texas
- Coordinates: 35°12′20.88″N 101°50′15.76″W
- Area: 90,491 square feet (0.0032459 sq mi)
- Built: 1927 or 1928
- Architectural style: Gothic Revival
- Added to NRHP: December 4, 2012

The Fisk Medical Arts Building, at 724 South Polk Street, also known as the Fisk Building and Fisk Medical Arts & Professional Building, is a historic tower block in Amarillo, Texas, United States.

== History ==
The building is 152 feet (46 m) tall, and has 12 stories. Designed by Guy Anton Carlander and constructed by the Gilsonite Contracting Company, it was built in 1927 or 1928, in the Gothic Revival style.

It was named for Charles A. Fisk, president of the Amarillo Bank and Trust Company, which occupied part of the building from 1935 to 1951. The building was then owned by the Zale Corporation. It was later used for doctor's and dentist's offices. Now owned by Courtyard by Marriott, the building was renovated in 2011, costing $12.7 million. It was added to the National Register of Historic Places on December 4, 2012. In 2013, a historical plaque was added to the building.

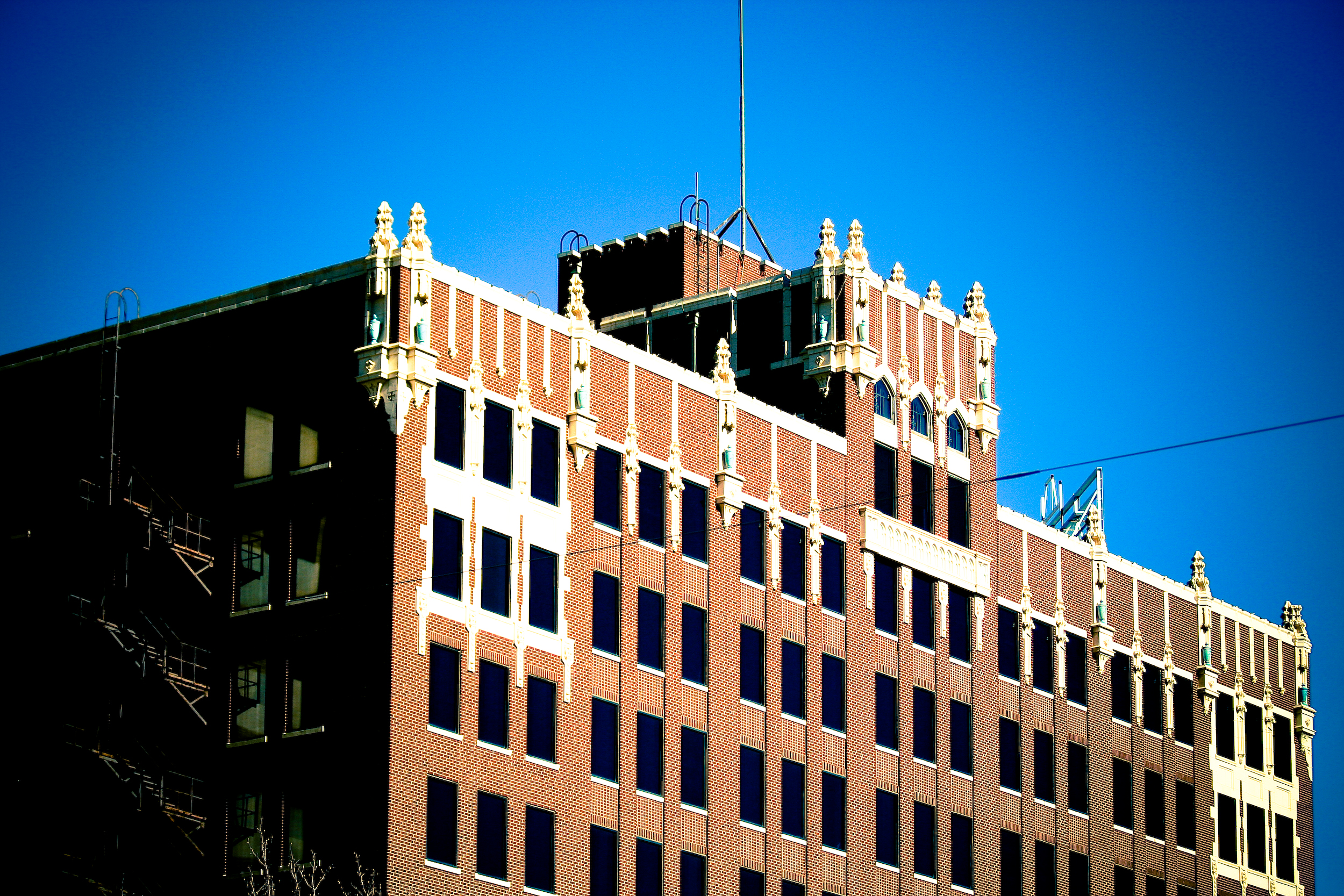

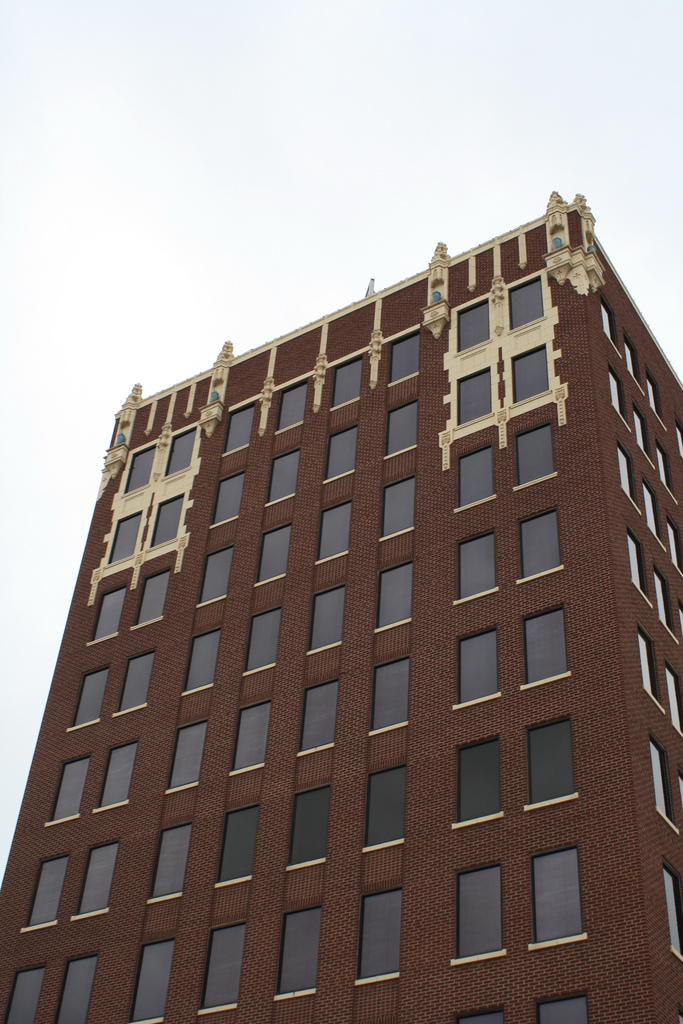

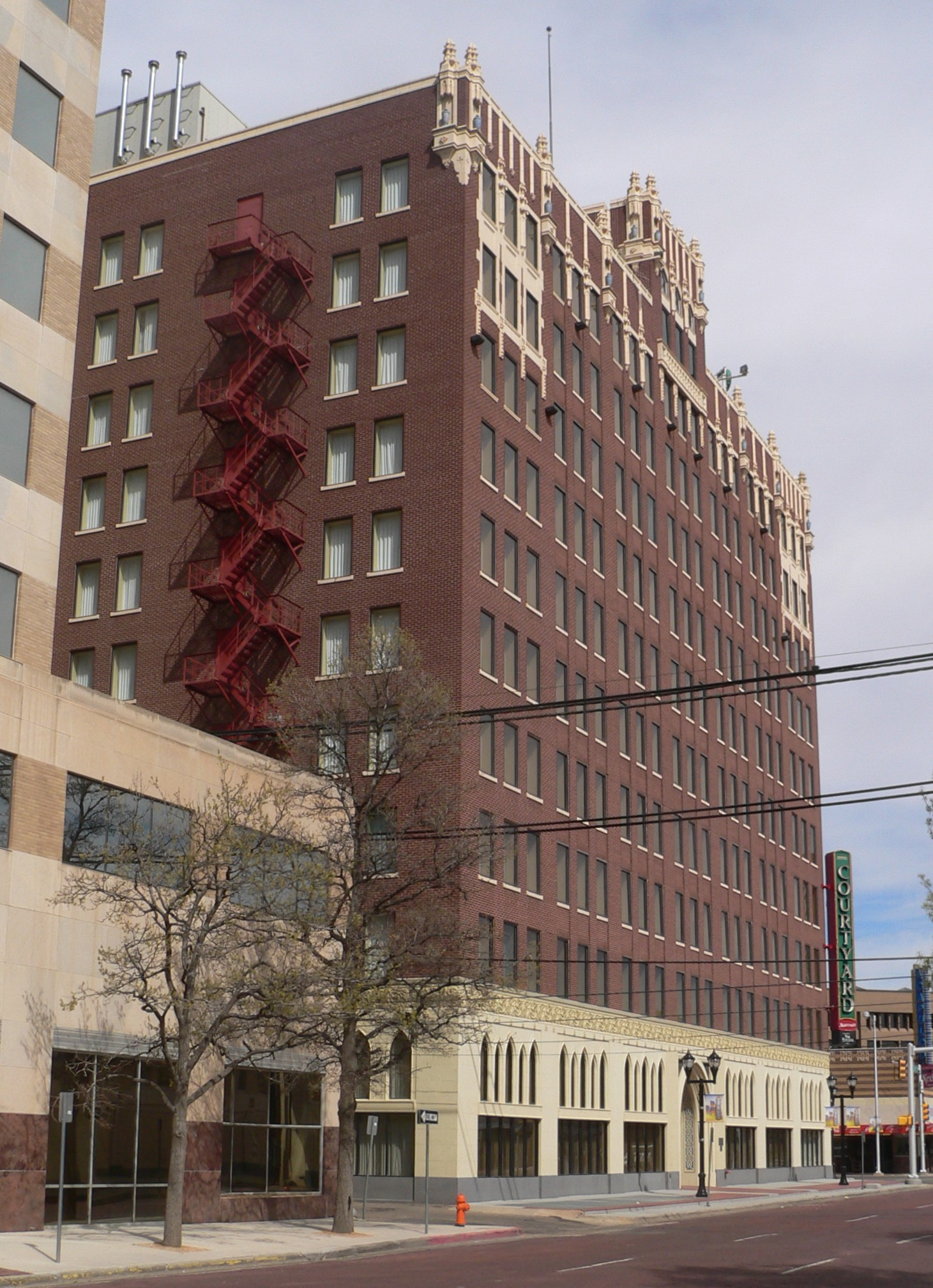

== See also ==
- List of tallest buildings in Amarillo
