= Amarillo Globe Dream House =

- U.S. National Register of Historic Places
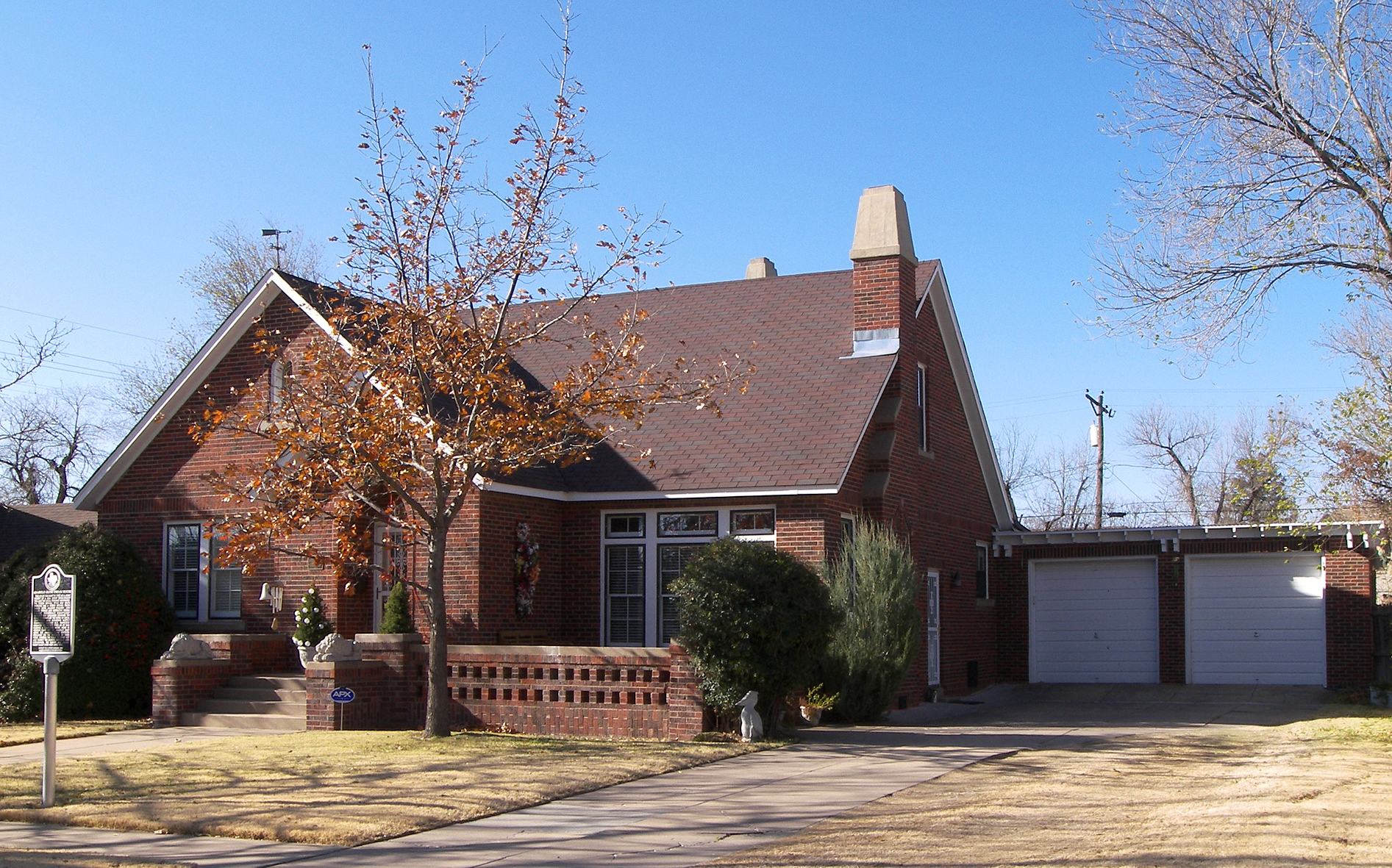
- The Amarillo Globe Dream House in 209

- Location within Texas Location within the United States
- Location: 3104 S. Harrison St. Amarillo, Texas
- Coordinates: 35°10′50″N 101°50′37″W
- Built: 1925
- Built by: M. C. Hancock
- Architect: Guy Anton Carlander
- Architectural style: Tudor Revival
- NRHP reference No.: 97001532
- Added to NRHP: December 8, 1997

The Amarillo Globe Dream House is a historic house in Amarillo, Texas.

The building was added to the National Register of Historic Places on December 8, 1997. The house also became a Recorded Texas Historic Landmark in 2008.

== History ==
The house was constructed in 1925, a project jointly constructed by the Amarillo Globe-News newspaper and a local real estate company. The home features red brick, in the Tudor revival style. A local architect, Guy Carlander designed the home and it was used as a project to showcase the talents of local builder M.C. Hancock.

== See also ==
- National Register of Historic Places listings in Randall County, Texas
