= Amarillo Natatorium =

Historic swimming pool in Texas, US

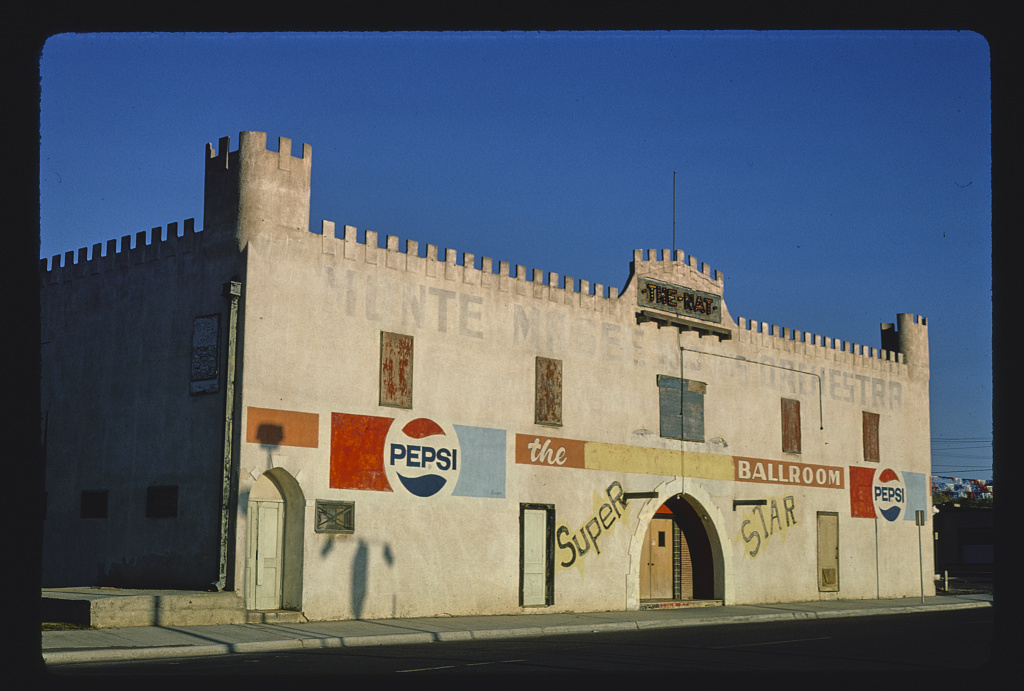
- The building in 1977
- Interactive map of Amarillo Natatorium
- Location: Amarillo, Texas, United States
- Dimensions: Length: 36 feet (11 m); Depth: 101 feet (31 m)

Construction
- Opened: July 1922
- Architect: Guy Anton Carlander
- Amarillo Natatorium
- U.S. Historic district – Contributing property
- Area: 3,600 square feet (400 sq yd)
- Part of: U.S. Route 66-Sixth Street Historic District (ID94000982)
- Designated CP: August 23, 1994

The Amarillo Natatorium, at 2705 W. 6th Avenue, often referred to as "The Nat", is a historic swimming pool in San Jacinto Heights, Amarillo, Texas.

== History ==
The Amarillo Natatorium was constructed by engineer Arthur Ball and salesman Felix Walker, and was designed by Guy Anton Carlander. It opened on July 14, 1922. It was built with no roof, but one was added in 1923 to operate the pool year-round.

In 1926, it was purchased by J. D. Tucker, who covered the pool with maple flooring, turning it into a ballroom. At some point, a second floor housed a casino. In the early 1930s, it was bought by Harry Badger, who renamed it to The Nat Dine and Dance Palace. He also added a café—The Nat Café—and castle design to the front, turning it into a nightclub. In the 1940s, it was bought by William Maddox, who kept it as a nightclub.

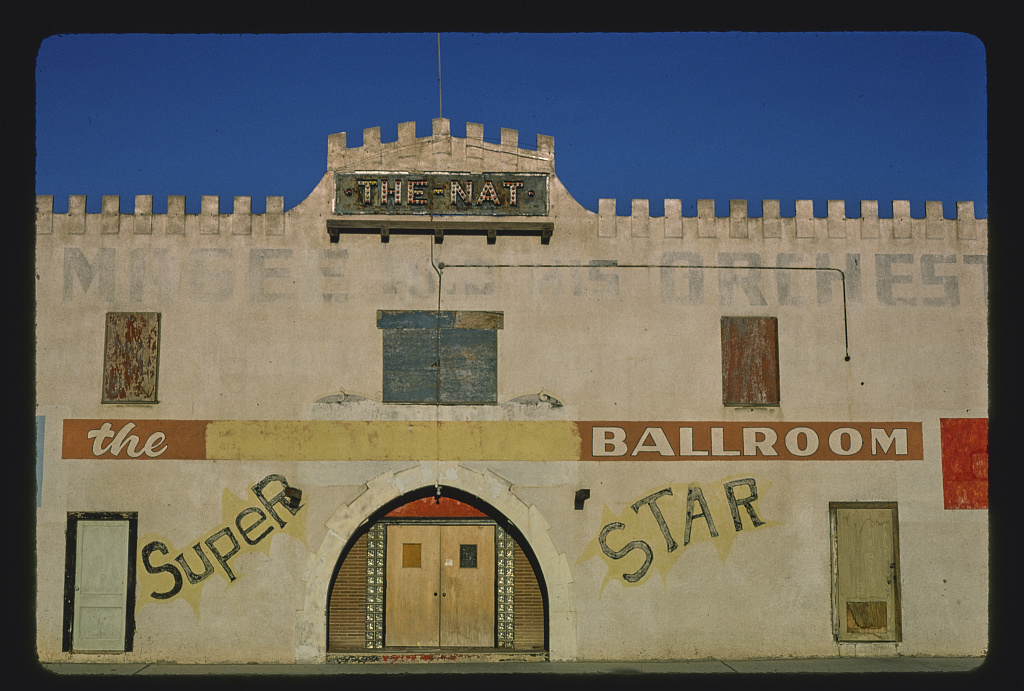
The front entrance

By the 1990s, it was owned by Mike and Jamie Cabins. In 1994, the U.S. Route 66-Sixth Street Historic District was added to the National Register of Historic Places, with Amarillo Natatorium as a contributing property. A plaque was added in 1996. It was reopened as an antiques shop in the 2000s, but later closed. By the 2020s, it was a marketplace owned by Kasey Robinson.
