= Joe Fortenberry =

American basketball player (1911–1993)

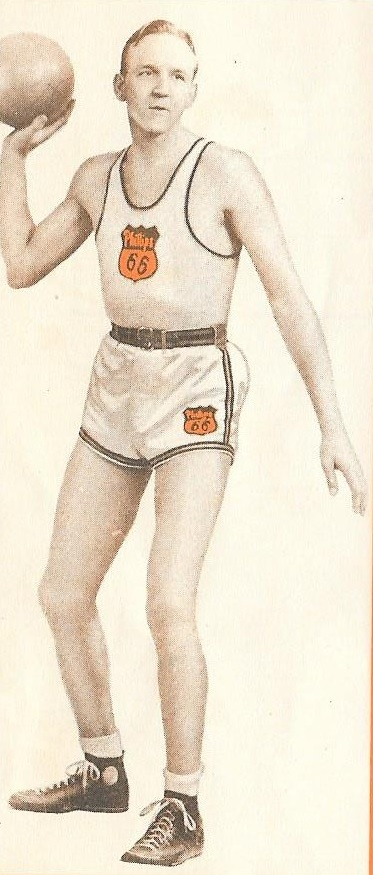
- Fortenberry with the Phillips 66ers.

Personal information
- Born: April 1, 1911 Leo, Cooke County, Texas, U.S.
- Died: June 3, 1993 (aged 82) Amarillo, Texas, U.S.
- Listed height: 6 ft 7 in (2.01 m)
- Listed weight: 200 lb (91 kg)

Career information
- High school: Happy (Happy, Texas)
- College: West Texas A&M (1929–1932)
- Position: Center

Career highlights
- 3x AAU All-American (1935, 1936, 1940)
Medals
Representing United States
Men's basketball
Olympic Games
| Gold medal – first place | 1936 Berlin | Team competition |

Joe Cephis Fortenberry (April 1, 1911 – June 3, 1993) was an American basketball player who competed in the 1936 Summer Olympics. He was a captain of the American basketball team, which won the gold medal in the first Olympics to include basketball.

After college, Fortenberry played for the Ogden Boosters in Utah, and then with the McPherson Oilers in McPherson, Kansas. This was the team that won the AAU National Championship in 1936, prior to the Olympics.

He played two games at the Olympics, including the final. He was the high scorer in the gold medal game, scoring 8 points in a 19–8 victory, and averaged a tournament-leading 14.5 points per game. The game was held in appalling conditions, outdoors on a muddy clay court, that made dribbling almost impossible, in steady rain and with winds that "blew the ball around wildly".

After he played in the Olympics, Fortenberry played five seasons with the Phillips 66ers, the perennial power in the AAU basketball league, the premier basketball league in the United States before the NBA. He played from the 1936–1937 season through the 1940–1941 season, winning an AAU national championship in 1940.

He is credited with being one of the first to slam dunk the basketball; this appeared in a New York Times article by Pulitzer Prize winning sports reporter, Arthur Daley, in 1936. He could still dunk when he was 55 years old, according to his son.

His Olympic gold medal was appraised on Antiques Roadshow on PBS. The estimated value of the medal was $100,000 to $150,000.
