= National Register of Historic Places listings in Randall County, Texas =

Location of Randall County in Texas

This is a list of the National Register of Historic Places listings in Randall County, Texas.

This is intended to be a complete list of properties and districts listed on the National Register of Historic Places in Randall County, Texas. There are one district and three individual properties listed on the National Register in the county. Two properties are also Recorded Texas Historic Landmarks.

This National Park Service list is complete through NPS recent listings posted March 21, 2025.

== Current listings ==
The locations of National Register properties and districts may be seen in a mapping service provided.

| | Name on the Register | Image | Date listed | Location | City or town | Description |
|---|---|---|---|---|---|---|
| 1 | Amarillo Globe Dream House | Amarillo Globe Dream House | December 8, 1997 (#97001532) | 3104 S. Harrison; 35°10′49″N 101°50′36″W | Amarillo | Recorded Texas Historic Landmark |
| 2 | L. T. Lester House | L. T. Lester House | September 13, 1978 (#78002975) | 310 8th St. 34°58′49″N 101°56′13″W | Canyon | Recorded Texas Historic Landmark |
| 3 | Llano Cemetery Historic District | Llano Cemetery Historic District | May 21, 1992 (#92000584) | 2900 South Hayes; 35°10′50″N 101°49′45″W | Amarillo | |
| 4 | St. Mary's Catholic Church | St. Mary's Catholic Church | June 21, 1983 (#83003159) | 22830 Pondesetta Rd; 34°57′24″N 102°06′29″W | Umbarger | |

== See also ==
- National Register of Historic Places listings in Texas
- Recorded Texas Historic Landmarks in Randall County
