= Kress, Texas =

City in Swisher County, Texas, United States

- City
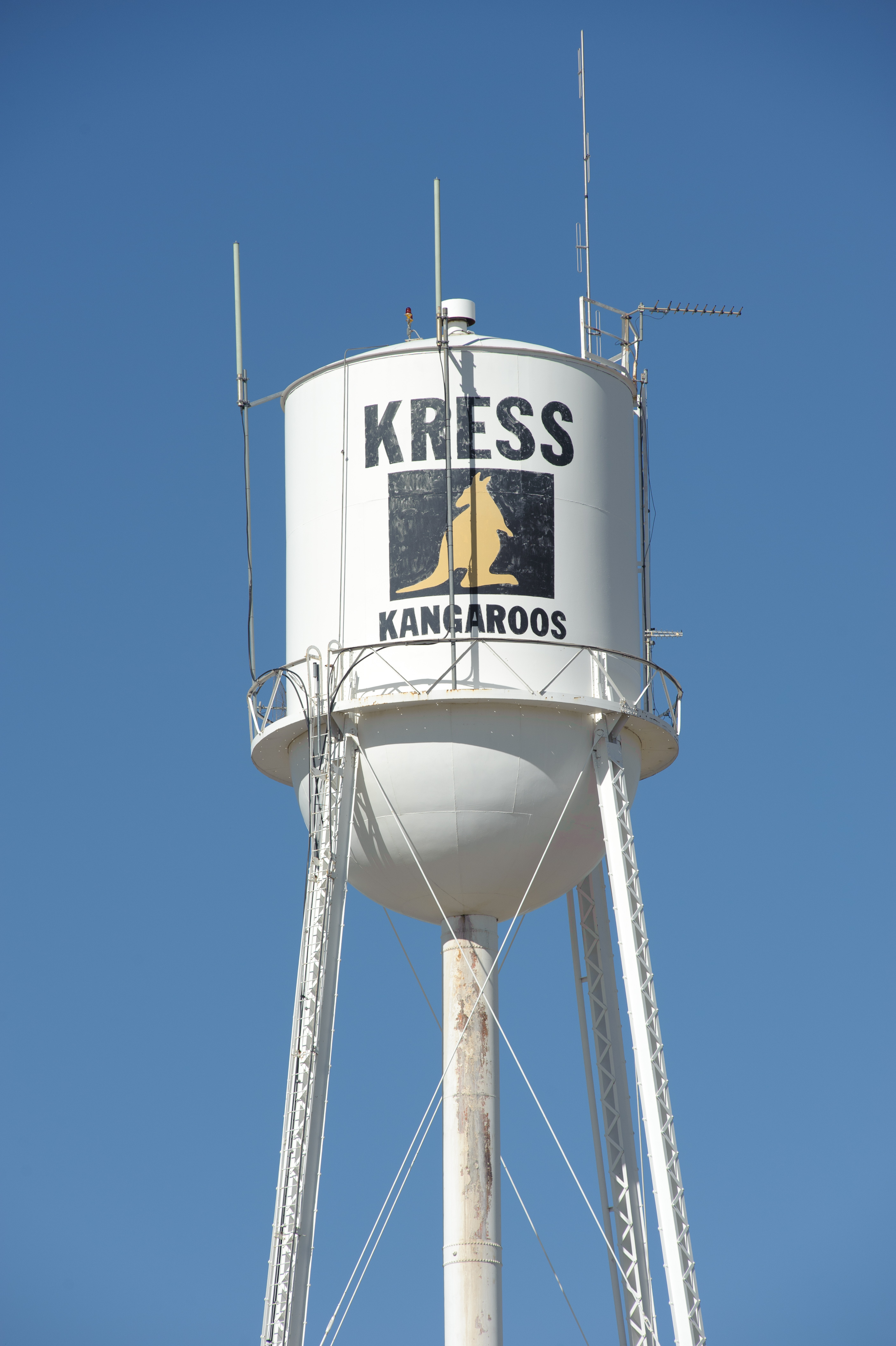
- Kress water tower, September 2010

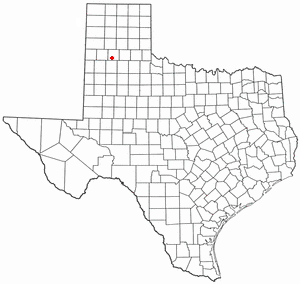
- Location of Kress, Texas

- Coordinates: 34°21′54″N 101°44′53″W
- Country: United States
- State: Texas
- County: Swisher

Area
  - Total: 0.57 sq mi (1.48 km^{2})
  - Land: 0.56 sq mi (1.44 km^{2})
  - Water: 0.015 sq mi (0.04 km^{2})
- Elevation: 3,471 ft (1,058 m)

Population (2020)
  - Total: 596
  - Density: 1,070/sq mi (414/km^{2})
- Time zone: UTC-6 (Central (CST))
  - Summer (DST): UTC-5 (CDT)
- ZIP code: 79052
- Area code: 806
- FIPS code: 48-39904
- GNIS feature ID: 1360768
- Website: cityofkress.com

Kress is a city in Swisher County, Texas, United States. The population was 596 at the 2020 census.

== Geography ==
Kress is located at 34°21′54″N 101°44′53″W (34.365010, –101.748129).

According to the United States Census Bureau, the city has a total area of 0.6 square mile (1.5 km^{2}), all land.

== Demographics ==
=== 2020 census ===
As of the 2020 census, Kress had a population of 596. The median age was 38.8 years, 26.8% of residents were under the age of 18, and 18.3% of residents were 65 years of age or older. For every 100 females there were 92.3 males, and for every 100 females age 18 and over there were 84.7 males age 18 and over.

0.0% of residents lived in urban areas, while 100.0% lived in rural areas.

There were 236 households in Kress, of which 37.7% had children under the age of 18 living in them. Of all households, 49.6% were married-couple households, 14.8% were households with a male householder and no spouse or partner present, and 28.4% were households with a female householder and no spouse or partner present. About 20.8% of all households were made up of individuals and 9.7% had someone living alone who was 65 years of age or older.

There were 267 housing units, of which 11.6% were vacant. The homeowner vacancy rate was 0.0% and the rental vacancy rate was 4.7%.

Racial composition as of the 2020 census
Race	Number	Percent
White	268	45.0%
Black or African American	24	4.0%
American Indian and Alaska Native	6	1.0%
Asian	1	0.2%
Native Hawaiian and Other Pacific Islander	1	0.2%
Some other race	154	25.8%
Two or more races	142	23.8%
Hispanic or Latino (of any race)	402	67.4%

=== 2000 census ===
Historical population
Census	Pop.	Note	%±
1960	438		—
1970	578		32.0%
1980	783		35.5%
1990	739		−5.6%
2000	826		11.8%
2010	715		−13.4%
2020	596		−16.6%
U.S. Decennial Census

As of the census of 2000, there were 826 people, 272 households, and 223 families residing in the city. The population density was 1,454.5 inhabitants per square mile (561.6/km^{2}). There were 291 housing units at an average density of 512.4 per square mile (197.8/km^{2}). The racial makeup of the city was 58.84% White, 3.27% African American, 0.36% Native American, 34.87% from other races, and 2.66% from two or more races. Hispanic or Latino of any race were 61.26% of the population.

There were 272 households, out of which 42.6% had children under the age of 18 living with them, 64.7% were married couples living together, 12.1% had a female householder with no husband present, and 18.0% were non-families. 17.3% of all households were made up of individuals, and 7.7% had someone living alone who was 65 years of age or older. The average household size was 3.04 and the average family size was 3.42.

In the city, the population was spread out, with 33.2% under the age of 18, 8.8% from 18 to 24, 24.2% from 25 to 44, 20.3% from 45 to 64, and 13.4% who were 65 years of age or older. The median age was 32 years. For every 100 females, there were 95.7 males. For every 100 females age 18 and over, there were 99.3 males.

The median income for a household in the city was $30,278, and the median income for a family was $31,618. Males had a median income of $22,000 versus $18,333 for females. The per capita income for the city was $12,305. About 15.1% of families and 17.5% of the population were below the poverty line, including 24.5% of those under age 18 and 11.1% of those age 65 or over.

== Education ==
The City of Kress is served by the Kress Independent School District and home to the Kress High School Kangaroos.

== Notable person ==
- Stella Garza-Hicks, Member of the Colorado House of Representatives

== See also ==
- List of municipalities in Texas
