= U.S. Route 66-Sixth Street Historic District =

- U.S. National Register of Historic Places
- U.S. Historic district
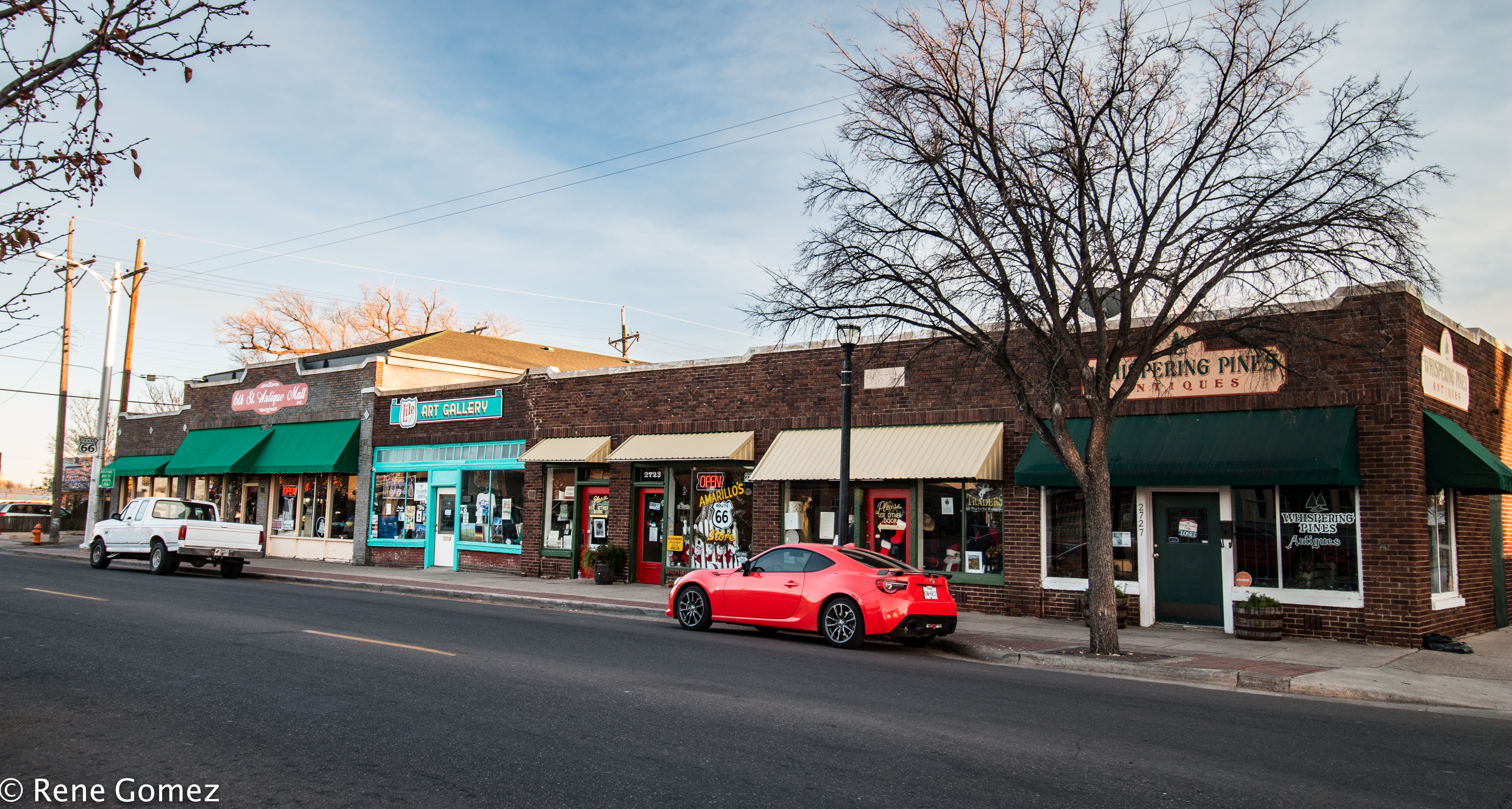
- US Route 66-Sixth Street Historic District in Amarillo

- Location within Texas Location within the United States
- Location: Sixth Ave. between Georgia and Forrest Aves. Amarillo, Texas
- Coordinates: 35°12′40″N 101°52′34″W
- Built: 1926
- Built by: Various (including the Bureau of Public Roads
- Architect: Various (including the Bureau of Public Roads
- NRHP reference No.: 94000982
- Added to NRHP: August 23, 1994

The US Route 66-Sixth Street Historic District is a historic district in Amarillo, Texas. The district is centered around the main section of the historic Route 66 in the San Jacinto Heights district of the city, which includes the Amarillo Natatorium.

The district was added to the National Register of Historic Places on August 23, 1994.
