= Zita, Texas =

- Unincorporated community
- Location within Texas Location within the United States
- Coordinates: 35°07′26″N 101°51′25″W
- Country: United States
- State: Texas
- County: Randall
- Elevation: 3,655 ft (1,114 m)
- Time zone: UTC-6 (Central (CST))
  - Summer (DST): UTC-5 (CDT)
- GNIS feature ID: 1380814

Zita is an unincorporated community in Randall County, located in the U.S. state of Texas. Zita was a station on the Panhandle and Santa Fe Railway near the intersection of Farm-to-Market Roads 335 and 1541, 10 miles northeast of Canyon in northern Randall County. During the early 1900s, a rural community grew with the establishment of a school 3 miles south of the railroad switch. A post office was opened on July 23, 1907, but was discontinued five years later. Doubling as the community center, the school remained in operation until its consolidation with the Canyon Independent School District. Subsequently, the building was demolished, and with the recent growth of south Amarillo, the community has gradually faded away. The records of the old Zita school are stored in the archives of the Panhandle-Plains Historical Museum.
