= Happy Independent School District =

School district in Texas

Coordinates: 34.7459°N 101.8602°W

Happy Independent School District is a public school district based in Happy, Texas (USA).

Located in Swisher County, portions of the district extend into Randall, Armstrong, and Castro counties.

In 2009, the school district was rated "recognized" by the Texas Education Agency.

== History ==
The district changed to a mixed schedule in fall 2022, in which class is not held on either a Monday or a Friday.

== Schools ==
- Happy High School (Grades 7–12)
- Happy Elementary (Grades K–6)
