= Ogg, Texas =

- Unincorporated community
- Location within Texas Location within the United States
- Coordinates: 34°50′07″N 101°53′25″W
- Country: United States
- State: Texas
- County: Randall
- Elevation: 3,668 ft (1,118 m)
- Time zone: UTC-6 (Central (CST))
  - Summer (DST): UTC-5 (CDT)
- GNIS feature ID: 1380288

Ogg is an unincorporated community in Randall County, located in the U.S. state of Texas.
