= Tulia High School =

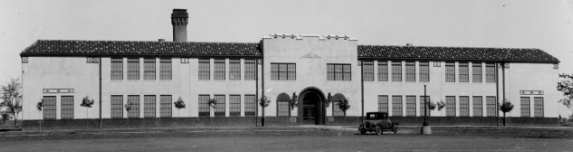
- Tulia High School, c. 1924

Location
- 501 Hornet Place; Tulia, Texas 79088-2411; United States; 34.541971°N 101.757935°W

Information
- School type: Public High School
- School district: Tulia Independent School District
- Principal: Michael Michaleson
- Teaching staff: 34.71 (FTE)
- Grades: 9-12
- Enrollment: 271 (2023–2024)
- Student to teacher ratio: 7.81
- Colors: Maroon & White
- Athletics conference: UIL Class 3A
- Mascot: Hornet/Lady Hornet (Henry the Hornet)
- Website: Tulia High School

Tulia High School is a public high school located in Tulia, Texas, United States that is classified as a 3A school by the University Interscholastic League (UIL). It is part of the Tulia Independent School District located in central Swisher County. The building was designed by Guy Anton Carlander. In 2013, the school was rated "Met Standard" by the Texas Education Agency. In 2005, The UIL One Act Play, performing scenes from “Into the Woods,” competed in the state UIL competition, taking home All Star Cast, Kaitlin Jones, Honorable Mention All Star Cast, Blane Womack and Andrew McCaslin.
