= San Jacinto Heights, Amarillo, Texas =

Neighborhood of Amarillo, Texas, US

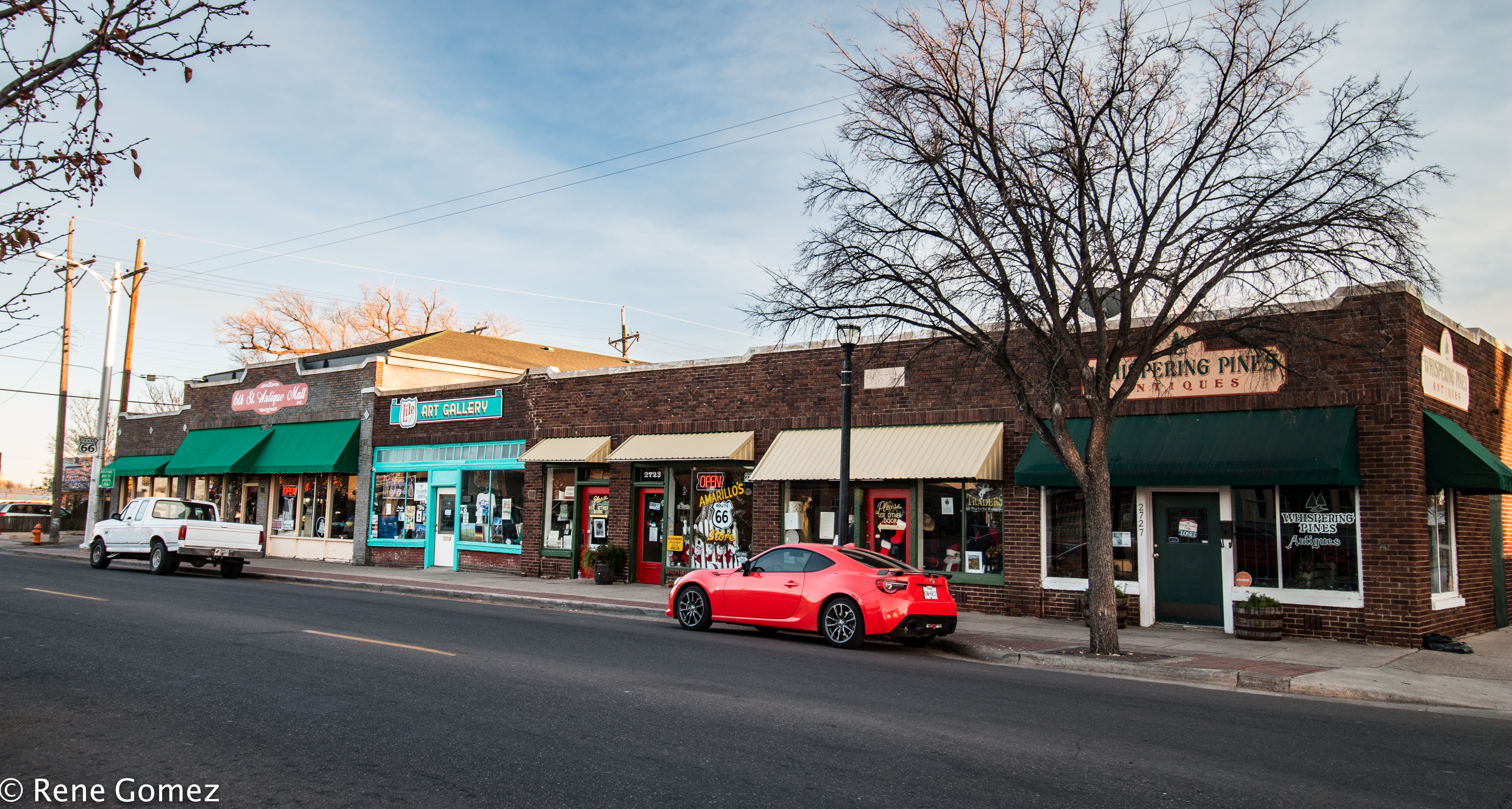
U.S. Route 66-Sixth Street Historic District, in San Jacinto (2017)

San Jacinto Heights is a neighborhood of Amarillo, Texas.

== History ==
San Jacinto Heights was established in 1909 by the Amarillo Improvement Company. In 1910, a trolley service was established between San Jacinto and downtown, operating until 1926. The neighborhood also had a newspaper, The Booster, established in 1925.

The neighborhood intersects with U.S, Route 66, and houses the U.S. Route 66-Sixth Street Historic District, which includes the Amarillo Natatorium inside San Jacinto.
