= Rockwell Place, Texas =

- Census-designated place
- Location within Texas Location within the United States
- Coordinates: 35°02′32″N 101°54′30″W
- Country: United States
- State: Texas
- County: Randall

Area
  - Total: 2.33 sq mi (6.03 km^{2})
  - Land: 2.33 sq mi (6.03 km^{2})
  - Water: 0 sq mi (0.0 km^{2})
- Elevation: 3,639 ft (1,109 m)
- Time zone: UTC-6 (Central (CST))
  - Summer (DST): UTC-5 (CDT)
- ZIP Codes: 79015 (Canyon); 79118 (Amarillo)
- Area code: 806
- FIPS code: 48-62834
- GNIS feature ID: 2805836

Rockwell Place is an unincorporated area and census-designated place (CDP) in Randall County, Texas, United States. It was first listed as a CDP prior to the 2020 census. As of the 2020 census, Rockwell Place had a population of 1,811.

It is north of the center of the county, on the east side of Interstate 27. It is bordered to the south by Canyon, the county seat. Amarillo is 14 miles (23 km) to the north.

== Demographics ==
Historical population
Census	Pop.	Note	%±
2020	1,811		—
U.S. Decennial Census; 1850–1900 1910; 1920 1930 1940; 1950 1960 1970; 1980 1990 2000; 2010 2020

Rockwell Place first appeared as a census designated place in the 2020 U.S. census.

=== 2020 census ===
Rockwell Place CDP, Texas – Racial and ethnic composition Note: the US Census treats Hispanic/Latino as an ethnic category. This table excludes Latinos from the racial categories and assigns them to a separate category. Hispanics/Latinos may be of any race.
Race / Ethnicity (NH = Non-Hispanic)	Pop 2020	% 2020
White alone (NH)	1,317	72.72%
Black or African American alone (NH)	6	0.33%
Native American or Alaska Native alone (NH)	8	0.44%
Asian alone (NH)	2	0.11%
Native Hawaiian or Pacific Islander alone (NH)	1	0.06%
Other race alone (NH)	5	0.28%
Mixed race or Multiracial (NH)	99	5.47%
Hispanic or Latino (any race)	373	20.60%
Total	1,811	100.00%
