= Happy, Texas =

Town in Randall and Swisher counties in Texas, US

- Town
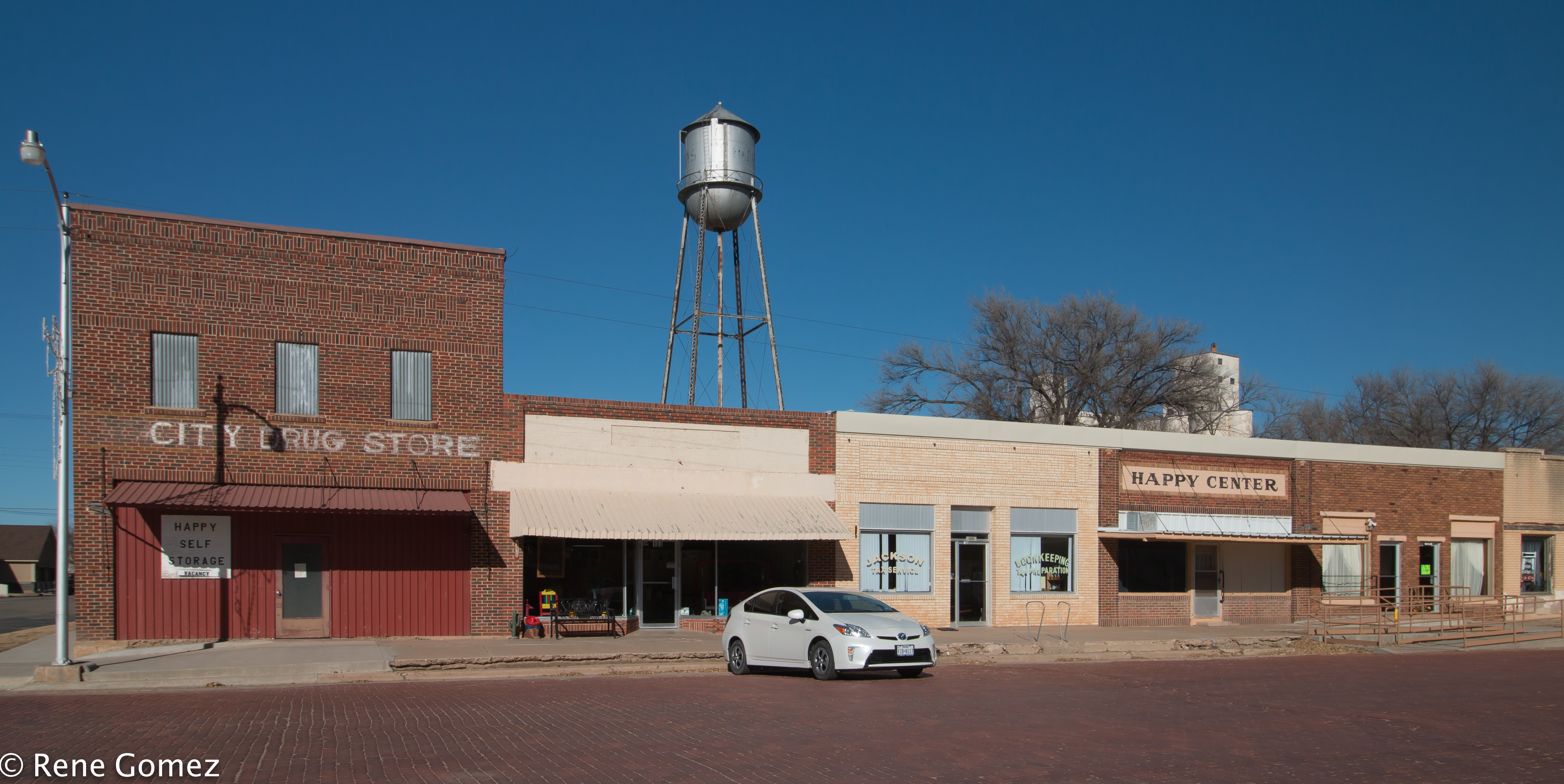
- Downtown Happy, Texas
- Motto: The Town Without A Frown
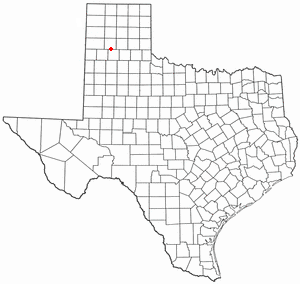
- Location of Happy, Texas

- Coordinates: 34°44′37″N 101°51′17″W
- Country: United States
- State: Texas
- Counties: Swisher, Randall

Area
  - Total: 1.06 sq mi (2.75 km^{2})
  - Land: 1.06 sq mi (2.75 km^{2})
  - Water: 0 sq mi (0.00 km^{2})
- Elevation: 3,616 ft (1,102 m)

Population (2020)
  - Total: 602
  - Density: 567/sq mi (219/km^{2})
- Time zone: UTC-6 (Central (CST))
  - Summer (DST): UTC-5 (CDT)
- ZIP code: 79042
- Area code: 806
- FIPS code: 48-32156
- GNIS feature ID: 1358748

Happy is a town in Randall and Swisher Counties in the U.S. state of Texas. Its population was 602 at the 2020 census. The Randall County portion of Happy is part of the Amarillo metropolitan area.

== History ==
The origin of Happy's name may derive its name from Happy Draw, a stream named in the 19th century by the team of cowboys who were happy to find water there. It has frequently been noted on lists of unusual place names. The town's motto is "the Town Without a Frown".

In 1920, the Happy Chamber of Commerce announced plans to incorporate. Happy postmasters have reported high mail volume throughout the town's history, including out-of-town requests for the Happy postmark on their mail. In 1980, a newly hired Happy postmaster was "just content to live in Happy and serve its citizens" as he answered out-of-town inquiries, such as a letter from a young girl who said, "I like the name of your time since I like to be happy", and a bride-to-be whose Happy-stamped wedding invitations "just thrilled her to death".

In 1933, the Happy school principal was hospitalized with several knife wounds after being stabbed by the president of a Happy bank over a dispute stemming from a handling fee.

In 1950, a Happy grain elevator collapsed, causing 75,000 bushels of wheat to be dumped from its tower, leading one Happy man to be hospitalized and an estimated $100,000 in damages, following reports the previous year that "Happy, Texas is unhappy about learning tower".

Happy citizens were described as "more than just happy" about a new 750-foot well that was dug in 1964: "They were jubilant." In the late 1970s, droughts caused a "desperate situation" among Happy farmers. The mayor of Happy reported, "It's bad all over" and described it as "definitely a depressed situation". "Our farmers are running out of water," he said. "Little towns like our seem to be drying up." One farmer who was described as "John Wayne with a pitchfork" said "expenses were so high that a single year would break me."

Happy Independent School District pursued changes in state policy after being burdened by excessive paperwork, with headlines declaring that Happy schools were "anything but happy"

Headlines often remark on the happiness of Happy residents, such as "Happy (Texas) Man Hits Jackpot" And "Happy, Texas Citizens Happy".

Happy has a number of institutions including Happy Cemetery, Happy Grain, Happy Bank, Happy City Hall, Happy High School, and Happy Game Room. The only reported restaurant is My Happy Place. A shop with memorobilia opens on weekends at a former cinema, The Grand in Happy.

== Geography ==
Happy is located primarily within Swisher County.

According to the United States Census Bureau, the town has a total area of 1.1 square miles (2.8 km^{2}), all land.

== Demographics ==
Historical population
Census	Pop.	Note	%±
1930	724		—
1940	576		−20.4%
1950	690		19.8%
1960	624		−9.6%
1970	672		7.7%
1980	674		0.3%
1990	588		−12.8%
2000	647		10.0%
2010	678		4.8%
2020	602		−11.2%
U.S. Decennial Census

=== 2020 census ===
Happy racial composition (NH = Non-Hispanic) (Note: Note: the US Census treats Hispanic/Latino as an ethnic category. This table excludes Latinos from the racial categories and assigns them to a separate category. Hispanics/Latinos can be of any race.)
Race	Number	Percentage
White (NH)	471	78.24%
Black or African American (NH)	7	1.16%
Native American or Alaska Native (NH)	5	0.83%
Mixed/multiracial (NH)	6	1.0%
Hispanic or Latino	113	18.77%
Total	602	

As of the 2020 United States census, 602 people, 226 households, and 111 families resided in the town.

=== 2010 census ===
As of the census of 2010, 678 people, 267 households, and 182 families resided in the town. The population density was 607.5 inhabitants per square mile (234.6/km^{2}). The 295 housing units averaged 277.0 units per square mile (107.0 units/km^{2}). The racial makeup of the town was 88.05% White, 0.29% African American, 1.77% Native American, 8.11% from other races, and 1.77% from two or more races. Hispanics or Latinos of any race were 17.31% of the population.

Of the 267 households, 30.7% had children under 18 living with them, 59.2% were married couples living together, 5.2% had a female householder with no husband present, and 31.8% were not families; 28.1% of all households were made up of individuals, and 16.1% had someone living alone who was 65 or older. The average household size was 2.42, and the average family size was 2.97.

In the town, the population was distributed as 25.8% under 18, 9.3% from 18 to 24, 26.7% from 25 to 44, 19.3% from 45 to 64, and 18.9% who were 65 or older. The median age was 38 years. For every 100 females, there were 95.5 males. For every 100 females 18 and over, there were 100.0 males.

The median income in the town for a household was $28,393 and for a family was $39,375. Males had a median income of $26,964 versus $17,917 for females. The per capita income for the town was $14,618. About 10.9% of families and 13.4% of the population were below the poverty line, including 12.1% of those under 18 and 10.0% of those 65 or over.

As of 2011, the population of Happy was decreasing by 10% annually because of the water shortage.

== Education ==
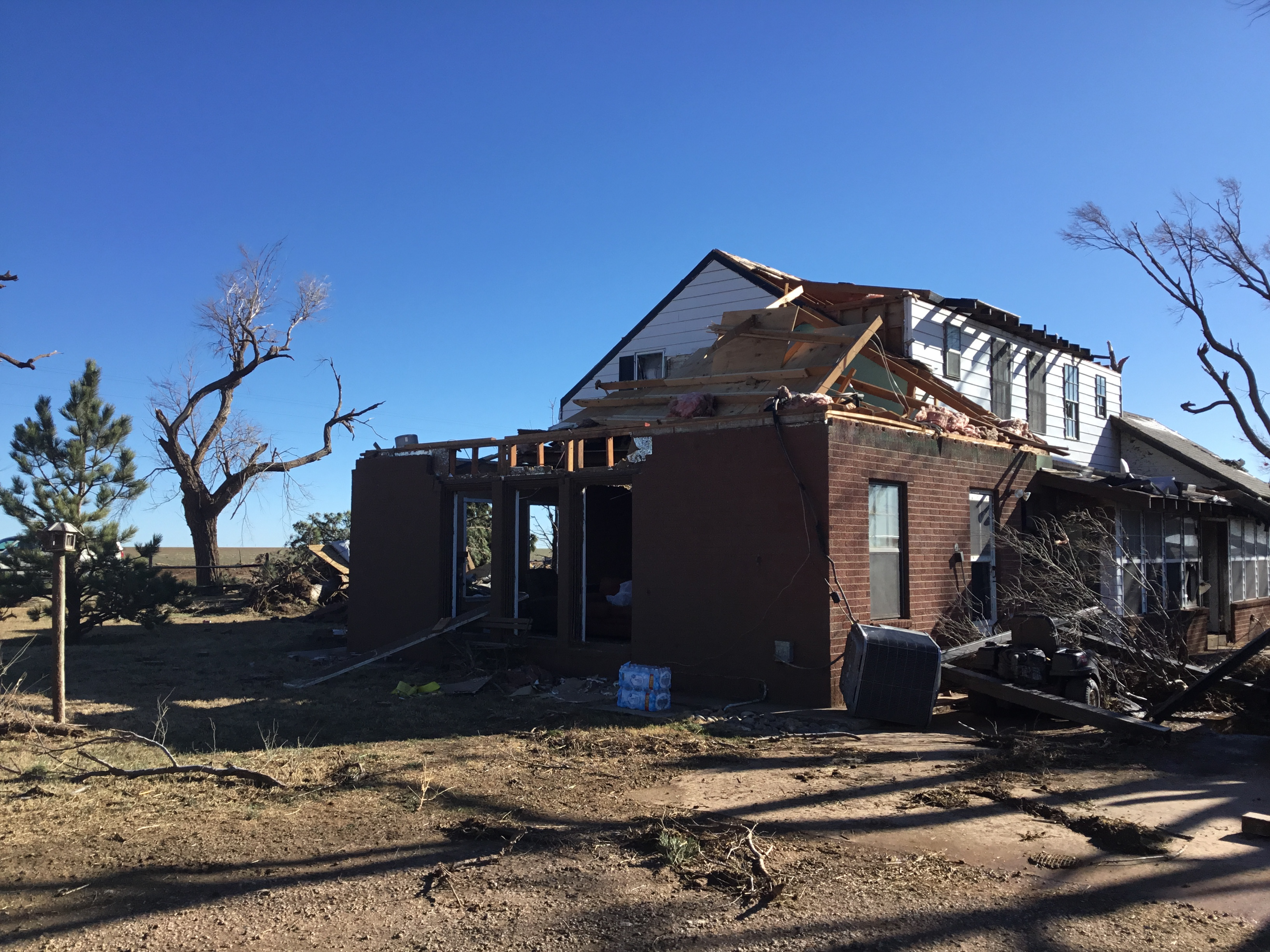
A home damaged by a large EF2 tornado north of Happy, Texas, in 2021

The City of Happy is served by the Happy Independent School District and home to the Happy High School Cowboys.

== Notable people ==
- Barry G. Clark, one of the pioneers of the Very Large Array, was born in Happy.
- Joe Cephis Fortenberry was the captain of the first U.S. Olympic men's basketball team.
- Buddy Knox, rockabilly musician, was born in Happy.

=== The Uncle Sam Band ===
Happy is the home of the Uncle Sam Band, which was organized in the 1930s and directed by Happy High School Band Director James Douglass Forbus. The Uncle Sam Band led a parade in Amarillo, Texas, during a visit by President Franklin D. Roosevelt.

== Climate ==
According to the Köppen climate classification, Happy has a semiarid climate, BSk on climate maps. The town has been hit by two (E)F2 tornadoes – the first on May 5, 2002, and a second on March 13, 2021.

== Environment ==
The former Attebury Grain Storage Facility within the town was added to the Superfund National Priorities List by the United States Environmental Protection Agency in April 2009 because hazardous chemicals were found in the soil and groundwater. Carbon tetrachloride, which was used to extinguish a fire at the storage facility in 1962, was found in a municipal water well and several private wells.

== In popular culture ==
The film Happy, Texas, which was named for the town and set there, was not filmed there.
