= Randall County, Texas =

County in Texas, United States

- County
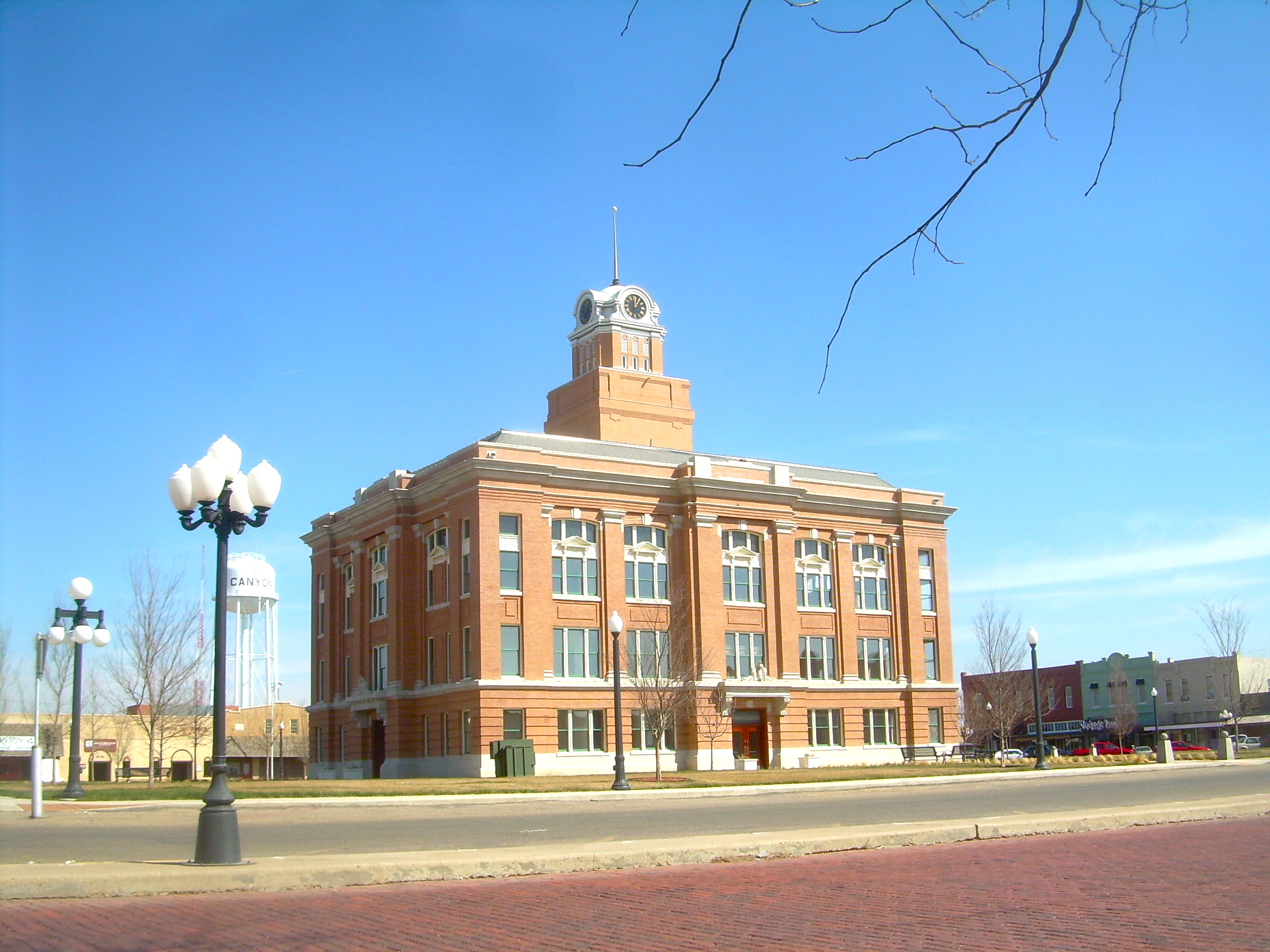
- The Randall County Courthouse in 2011

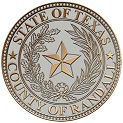
- Seal

- Location within the U.S. state of Texas
- Coordinates: 34°58′N 101°54′W
- Country: United States
- State: Texas
- Founded: 1889
- Named for: Horace Randal
- Seat: Canyon
- Largest city: Amarillo

Area
  - Total: 922 sq mi (2,390 km^{2})
  - Land: 912 sq mi (2,360 km^{2})
  - Water: 11 sq mi (28 km^{2}) 1.2%

Population (2020)
  - Total: 140,753
  - Estimate (2025): 152,351 ▲
  - Density: 154/sq mi (59.6/km^{2})
- Time zone: UTC−6 (Central)
  - Summer (DST): UTC−5 (CDT)
- Congressional district: 13th
- Website: www.randallcounty.gov

Randall County is a county located in the U.S. state of Texas. As of the 2020 census, its population was 140,753. Its county seat is Canyon. The county was created in 1876 and later organized in 1889. It is named for Horace Randal, a Confederate brigadier general killed at the Battle of Jenkins Ferry. The reason the county name differs from his is because the bill creating the county misspelled Randal's name.

Randall County, alongside adjacent Potter County, is part of the Amarillo metropolitan statistical area.

At one time, the large JA Ranch, founded by Charles Goodnight and John George Adair, which reached into six counties, held acreage in Randall County.

== Geography ==
According to the U.S. Census Bureau, the county has a total area of 922 square miles (2,390 km^{2}), of which 11 square miles (28 km^{2}) (1.2%) are covered by water.

Palo Duro Canyon, the second-largest canyon in the United States, is located in Randall County.

=== Major highways ===
- Interstate 27
- U.S. Highway 60
- U.S. Highway 87
- State Highway 217
- Loop 335

=== Adjacent counties ===
- Potter County (north)
- Oldham County (northwest)
- Armstrong County (east)
- Carson County (northeast)
- Swisher County (south)
- Briscoe County (southeast)
- Castro County (southwest)
- Deaf Smith County (west)

=== National protected area ===
- Buffalo Lake National Wildlife Refuge

== Demographics ==
Historical population
Census	Pop.	Note	%±
1880	3		—
1890	187		6,133.3%
1900	963		415.0%
1910	3,312		243.9%
1920	3,675		11.0%
1930	7,071		92.4%
1940	7,185		1.6%
1950	13,774		91.7%
1960	33,913		146.2%
1970	53,885		58.9%
1980	75,062		39.3%
1990	89,673		19.5%
2000	104,312		16.3%
2010	120,725		15.7%
2020	140,753		16.6%
2025 (est.)	152,351	▲	8.2%
U.S. Decennial Census; 1850–2010 2010 2020

=== Racial and ethnic composition ===
Randall County, Texas – Racial and ethnic composition Note: the US Census treats Hispanic/Latino as an ethnic category. This table excludes Latinos from the racial categories and assigns them to a separate category. Hispanics/Latinos may be of any race.
Race / Ethnicity (NH = Non-Hispanic)	Pop 2000	Pop 2010	Pop 2020	% 2000	% 2010	% 2020
White alone (NH)	89,426	94,361	95,457	85.73%	78.16%	67.82%
Black or African American alone (NH)	1,513	2,701	4,567	1.45%	2.24%	3.24%
Native American or Alaska Native alone (NH)	525	586	794	0.50%	0.49%	0.56%
Asian alone (NH)	1,048	1,625	2,604	1.00%	1.35%	1.85%
Pacific Islander alone (NH)	21	29	54	0.02%	0.02%	0.04%
Other race alone (NH)	46	93	412	0.04%	0.08%	0.29%
Mixed/multiracial (NH)	1,015	1,555	5,282	0.97%	1.29%	3.75%
Hispanic or Latino (any race)	10,718	19,775	31,583	10.27%	16.38%	22.44%
Total	104,312	120,725	140,753	100.00%	100.00%	100.00%

=== 2020 census ===
As of the 2020 census, the county had a population of 140,753. The median age was 36.4 years; 24.2% of the residents were under 18 and 15.7% were 65 or older. The female/male ratio was 1:0.958 overall and 1:0.936 males for those 18 and over.

The racial makeup of the county was 75.2% White, 3.5% Black or African American, 0.9% American Indian and Alaska Native, 1.9% Asian, <0.1% Native Hawaiian and Pacific Islander, 6.0% from some other race, and 12.3% from two or more races. Hispanic or Latino residents of any race comprised 22.4% of the population.

About 83.0% of residents lived in urban areas, while 17.0% lived in rural areas.

Of the 55,615 households in the county, 31.7% had children under 18 living in them, 51.6% were married-couple households, 17.5% were households with a male householder and no spouse or partner present, and 25.2% were households with a female householder and no spouse or partner present. About 27.0% of all households were made up of individuals, and 10.2% had someone living alone who was 65 or older.

The county had 60,599 housing units, of which 8.2% were vacant. Among occupied housing units, 67.0% were owner-occupied and 33.0% were renter-occupied. The homeowner vacancy rate was 1.7% and the rental vacancy rate was 12.3%.

=== 2000 census ===
As of the 2000 census, 104,312 people, 41,240 households, and 28,785 families resided in the county. The population density was 114 people per square mile (44 people/km^{2}). The 43,261 housing units averaged 47 units per square mile (18/km^{2}). The racial makeup of the county was 90.44% White, 1.50% Black or African American, 0.65% Native American, 1.03% Asian, 0.03% Pacific Islander, 4.71% from other races, and 1.64% from two or more races. About 10.3% of the population were Hispanic or Latino of any race.

Of the 41,240 households, 33.90% had children under 18 living with them, 57.50% were married couples living together, 9.20% had a female householder with no husband present, and 30.20% were not families; 25.40% of all households were made up of individuals, and 8.50% had someone living alone who was 65 or older. The average household size was 2.49, and the average family size was 3.00.

In the county, the age distribution was 26.1% under 18, 11.2% from 18 to 24, 28.4% from 25 to 44, 22.40% from 45 to 64, and 11.90% who were 65 or older. The median age was 35 years. For every 100 females, there were 94.70 males. For every 100 females 18 and over, there were 91.20 males.

The median income in the county for a household was $42,712 and for a family was $52,420. Males had a median income of $36,333 versus $25,358 for females. The per capita income for the county was $21,840. About 5.7% of families and 8.1% of the population were below the poverty line, including 8.5% of those under 18 and 6.6% of those 65 or over.

== Politics ==
Although once more Democratic-leaning, the county has become solidly Republican. The Republican candidate has carried the county in every presidential election since 1952, usually by overwhelming margins. In the last thirteen elections, no Republican candidate has received less than 61% of the county's vote, and since 2000, Randall has been the nation's most Republican "metropolitan" county outside of predominantly Mormon counties in Utah.

Randall County was one of the more than 200 counties in Texas to cast the majority of its votes for Republican John McCain, who received 41,895 votes, (81%), while Democrat Barack Obama received 9,461 votes (18%) of the total, far below his national percentage.

Randall County is located within District 86 of the Texas House of Representatives and District 31 of the Texas Senate.

United States presidential election results for Randall County, Texas
Year	Republican		Democratic		Third party(ies)	
Year	No.	%	No.	%	No.	%
1912	21	6.34%	269	81.27%	41	12.39%
1916	63	14.93%	341	80.81%	18	4.27%
1920	183	33.21%	360	65.34%	8	1.45%
1924	154	18.22%	627	74.20%	64	7.57%
1928	733	52.66%	659	47.34%	0	0.00%
1932	231	14.10%	1,394	85.10%	13	0.79%
1936	142	7.87%	1,656	91.80%	6	0.33%
1940	382	17.67%	1,779	82.28%	1	0.05%
1944	409	19.34%	1,439	68.04%	267	12.62%
1948	722	26.05%	1,936	69.84%	114	4.11%
1952	4,305	69.28%	1,905	30.66%	4	0.06%
1956	4,609	62.28%	2,774	37.49%	17	0.23%
1960	6,958	67.76%	3,282	31.96%	29	0.28%
1964	7,843	56.50%	6,016	43.34%	22	0.16%
1968	11,400	61.32%	4,060	21.84%	3,132	16.85%
1972	18,557	83.13%	3,470	15.54%	296	1.33%
1976	17,115	64.53%	9,074	34.21%	335	1.26%
1980	23,136	73.72%	7,323	23.34%	923	2.94%
1984	30,249	83.08%	6,044	16.60%	116	0.32%
1988	27,986	76.33%	8,492	23.16%	188	0.51%
1992	24,971	61.60%	9,119	22.50%	6,447	15.90%
1996	28,266	71.33%	9,177	23.16%	2,184	5.51%
2000	33,921	81.17%	7,209	17.25%	660	1.58%
2004	40,520	83.40%	7,849	16.15%	218	0.45%
2008	41,948	80.93%	9,468	18.27%	416	0.80%
2012	41,447	83.40%	7,574	15.24%	675	1.36%
2016	43,462	80.03%	8,367	15.41%	2,476	4.56%
2020	50,796	78.54%	12,802	19.79%	1,076	1.66%
2024	53,314	79.69%	12,935	19.33%	652	0.97%

United States Senate election results for Randall County, Texas1
Year	Republican		Democratic		Third party(ies)	
Year	No.	%	No.	%	No.	%
2024	51,991	77.73%	13,596	20.33%	1,302	1.95%

United States Senate election results for Randall County, Texas2
Year	Republican		Democratic		Third party(ies)	
Year	No.	%	No.	%	No.	%
2020	51,116	79.47%	11,618	18.06%	1,588	2.47%

Texas Gubernatorial election results for Randall County
Year	Republican		Democratic		Third party(ies)	
Year	No.	%	No.	%	No.	%
2022	39,243	81.72%	8,228	17.13%	548	1.14%

== Communities ==
=== Cities ===
- Amarillo (partly in Potter County)
- Canyon (county seat)

=== Towns ===
- Happy (mostly in Swisher County)

=== Villages ===
- Lake Tanglewood
- Palisades
- Timbercreek Canyon

=== Census-designated place ===
- Rockwell Place
- Umbarger

=== Unincorporated communities ===
- Ogg
- Zita

=== Ghost towns ===
- Cita

== Education ==
School districts include:

- Amarillo Independent School District
- Bushland Independent School District
- Canyon Independent School District
- Happy Independent School District
- Wildorado Independent School District

All of the county is in the service area of Amarillo College.

== See also ==
- National Register of Historic Places listings in Randall County, Texas
- Recorded Texas Historic Landmarks in Randall County
- List of museums in the Texas Panhandle
