= Guy Anton Carlander =

American architect (1888–1975)

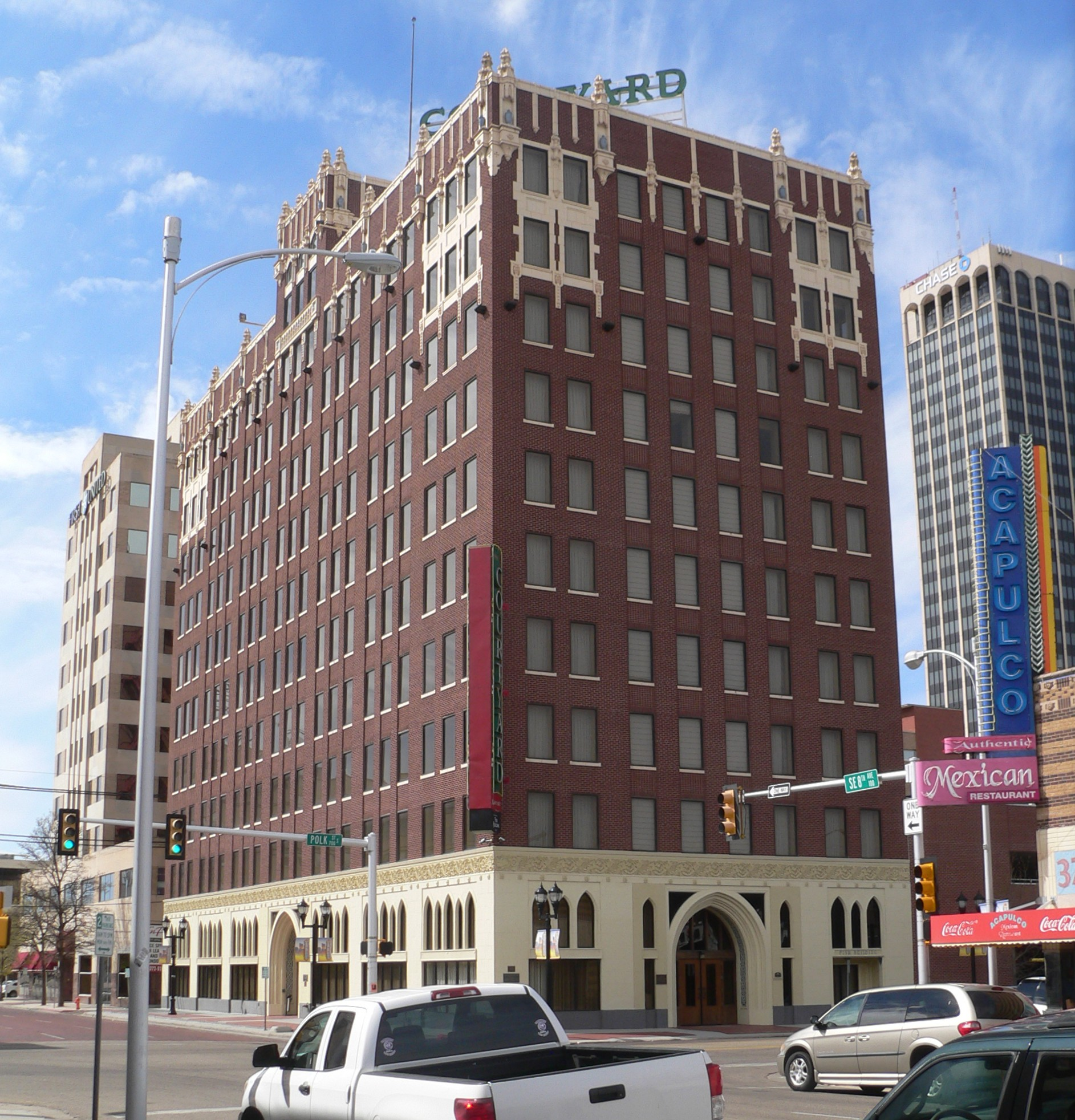
The Fisk Medical Arts Building, designed by Carlander

Guy Anton Carlander (April 8, 1888 – April 19, 1975) was an American architect. Born in Kansas, he designed many buildings in Amarillo, Texas.

== Works ==
- Alice Landergin School (c. 1928 or before)
- Amarillo Natatorium (July 1922)
- Amarillo Globe Dream House (1925)
- Childress High School (January 1927)
- Fisk Medical Arts Building (1927 or 1928)
- Palisade State Park Concession Building (1933)
- Palo Duro Canyon canyon-rim lodge (by January 1934)
- Tulia High School (c. 1924)
- Wellington High School (1929)
