= Tulia Independent School District =

School district in Texas

Tulia Independent School District is a public school district based in Tulia, Texas (USA).

In 2009, the school district was rated "academically acceptable" by the Texas Education Agency.

== Schools ==
- Tulia High School (Grades 9-12)
- Tulia Junior High School (Grades 6-8)
- W.V. Swinburn Elementary School (Grades 3-5)
- Highland Elementary School (Grades PK-2)
