= Tulia, Texas =

- City
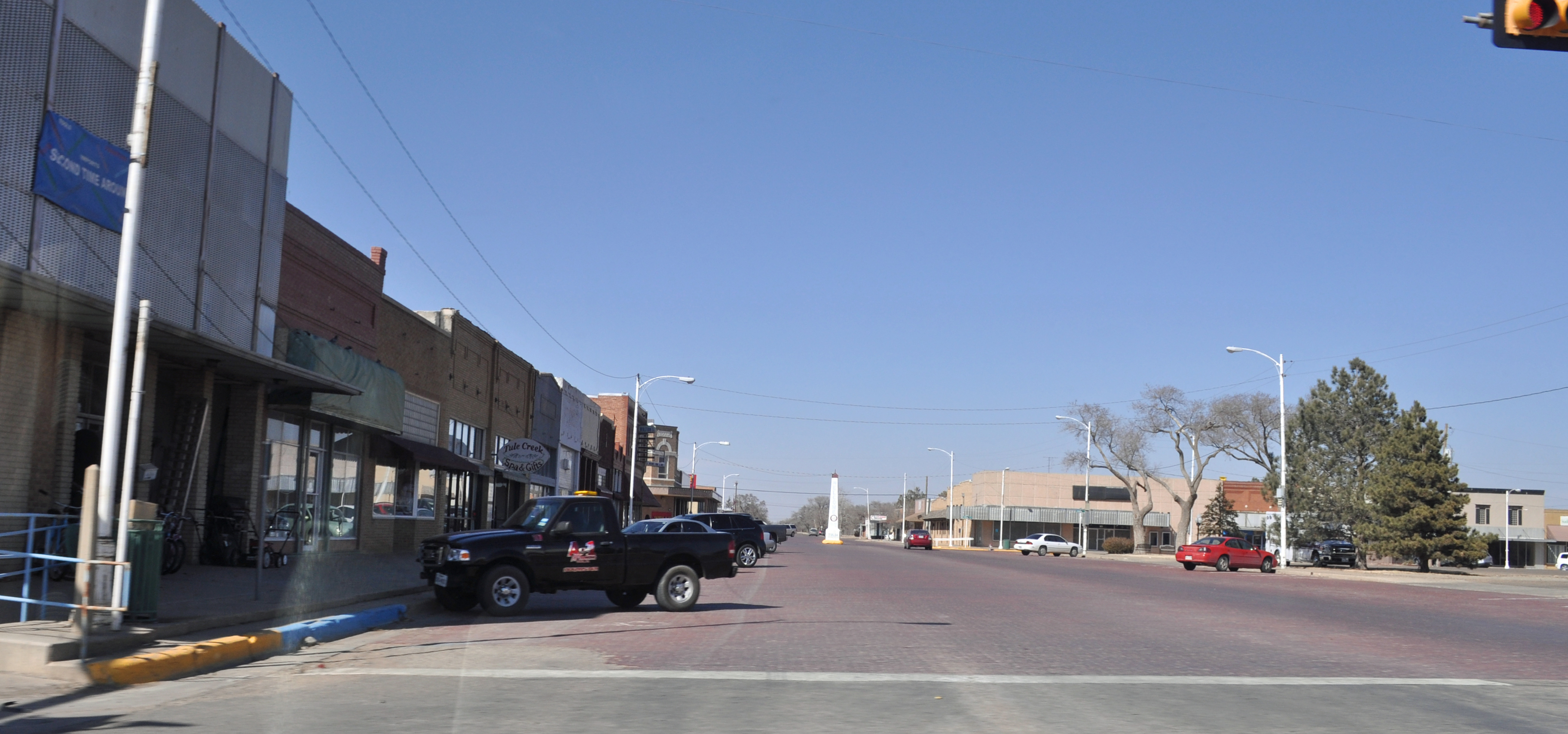
- Motto: The City With A Future

- Location of Tulia, Texas
- Coordinates: 34°32′09″N 101°45′31″W
- Country: United States
- State: Texas
- County: Swisher

Area
  - Total: 3.57 sq mi (9.24 km^{2})
  - Land: 3.56 sq mi (9.21 km^{2})
  - Water: 0.012 sq mi (0.03 km^{2})
- Elevation: 3,484 ft (1,062 m)

Population (2020)
  - Total: 4,473
  - Density: 1,260/sq mi (486/km^{2})
- Time zone: UTC-6 (Central (CST))
  - Summer (DST): UTC-5 (CDT)
- ZIP code: 79088
- Area code: 806
- FIPS code: 48-73868
- GNIS feature ID: 1370199
- Website: www.tuliatexas.org

Tulia is a city in and the county seat of Swisher County, Texas, United States. The population was 4,967 at the 2010 census; by the 2020 census, it had fallen to 4,473. The city is at the junction of U.S. Route 87 and Texas State Highway 86, about 2 miles (3 km) east of Interstate 27. Tulia is a center for farming and agribusiness activities.

== History ==
Its site was originally on the acreage of the Tule Ranch division of the JA Ranch. In 1887, a post office was established in James A. Parrish's dugout on Middle Tule Draw, 9 miles (14 km) west of what is now the site of Tulia. Evidently, the name Tule, after the nearby creek, had been selected for this post office, but at some point a clerk's error changed the name to Tulia. By 1900, Tulia was prospering as a stopping point for freight-wagon traffic en route to the railheads of Colorado City and Amarillo. A booming new era began with the extension of the Santa Fe line to Tulia in December 1906; with it came more settlers. In the mid-1980s, local industrial plants manufactured products such as clothing and farm implements, and four large cattle-feeding enterprises were nearby.

=== 1999 drug arrest scandal ===
In July 1999, the town of Tulia gained national attention due to its involvement in the controversial war on drugs. Undercover Officer Tom Coleman conducted a sting operation that led to forty-seven (Note: Although the book titled Tulia: Race, Cocaine, and Corruption in a Small Texas Town by Nate Blakeslee quotes the number of arrested as forty-seven (with names given), there are other books that quote the number at forty-six (without names).) citizens accused of dealing cocaine, equating to ten to twenty percent of the African American population being incarcerated.

Despite being tried, convicted, and sentenced to decades in prison, a group of attorneys led by Amarillo civil rights attorney Jeff Blackburn and Vanita Gupta from the NAACP Legal Defense and Educational Fund, ultimately succeeded in having the defendants released. In 2003 Texas Governor Rick Perry granted full pardons to thirty-five of the Tulia defendants. In 2005, Coleman was convicted of perjury and sentenced to 10 years' probation and a $7,500 fine.

== Geography ==
Tulia is located at 34°32′09″N 101°45′31″W. It is located 46 miles (74 km) south of Amarillo in the Texas Panhandle. According to the United States Census Bureau, the city has a total area of 3.5 square miles (9.1 km^{2}), all land.

=== Climate ===
According to the Köppen climate classification system, Tulia has a semiarid climate, BSk on climate maps.

Record low

Tulia holds the record for the lowest temperature in Texas, −23 °F (−31 °C), set during the Great Blizzard of 1899. The temperature was matched by Seminole, Texas, in 1933.

Climate data for Tulia, Texas, 1991–2020 normals, extremes 1896–1919, 1948–present
Month	Jan	Feb	Mar	Apr	May	Jun	Jul	Aug	Sep	Oct	Nov	Dec	Year
Record high °F (°C)	88 (31)	90 (32)	94 (34)	101 (38)	106 (41)	110 (43)	109 (43)	108 (42)	104 (40)	99 (37)	88 (31)	82 (28)	110 (43)
Mean maximum °F (°C)	73.1 (22.8)	77.4 (25.2)	84.6 (29.2)	89.2 (31.8)	95.8 (35.4)	100.6 (38.1)	100.4 (38.0)	99.1 (37.3)	95.8 (35.4)	89.9 (32.2)	80.9 (27.2)	73.2 (22.9)	103.4 (39.7)
Mean daily maximum °F (°C)	51.1 (10.6)	55.0 (12.8)	63.3 (17.4)	71.4 (21.9)	79.8 (26.6)	88.4 (31.3)	91.1 (32.8)	89.5 (31.9)	82.4 (28.0)	72.3 (22.4)	60.4 (15.8)	51.3 (10.7)	71.3 (21.8)
Daily mean °F (°C)	36.9 (2.7)	40.3 (4.6)	47.9 (8.8)	55.8 (13.2)	65.3 (18.5)	74.7 (23.7)	78.0 (25.6)	76.5 (24.7)	69.2 (20.7)	58.1 (14.5)	46.0 (7.8)	37.7 (3.2)	57.2 (14.0)
Mean daily minimum °F (°C)	22.7 (−5.2)	25.6 (−3.6)	32.6 (0.3)	40.1 (4.5)	50.9 (10.5)	61.1 (16.2)	64.9 (18.3)	63.5 (17.5)	56.0 (13.3)	43.9 (6.6)	31.7 (−0.2)	24.2 (−4.3)	43.1 (6.2)
Mean minimum °F (°C)	8.6 (−13.0)	10.9 (−11.7)	16.7 (−8.5)	26.2 (−3.2)	36.5 (2.5)	51.8 (11.0)	57.9 (14.4)	56.1 (13.4)	43.2 (6.2)	27.7 (−2.4)	15.4 (−9.2)	8.2 (−13.2)	3.1 (−16.1)
Record low °F (°C)	−12 (−24)	−23 (−31)	−1 (−18)	16 (−9)	15 (−9)	32 (0)	48 (9)	40 (4)	30 (−1)	14 (−10)	−3 (−19)	−11 (−24)	−23 (−31)
Average precipitation inches (mm)	0.70 (18)	0.69 (18)	1.36 (35)	1.46 (37)	2.70 (69)	2.94 (75)	2.41 (61)	2.65 (67)	1.99 (51)	1.91 (49)	0.96 (24)	0.77 (20)	20.54 (524)
Average snowfall inches (cm)	2.5 (6.4)	2.4 (6.1)	1.3 (3.3)	0.1 (0.25)	0.0 (0.0)	0.0 (0.0)	0.0 (0.0)	0.0 (0.0)	0.0 (0.0)	0.3 (0.76)	1.9 (4.8)	2.6 (6.6)	11.1 (28.21)
Average precipitation days (≥ 0.01 in)	2.9	3.7	4.8	4.9	6.9	7.7	6.6	7.7	6.0	5.1	3.8	3.7	63.8
Average snowy days (≥ 0.1 in)	1.4	1.4	0.8	0.1	0.0	0.0	0.0	0.0	0.0	0.2	0.6	1.7	6.2
Source 1: NOAA
Source 2: National Weather Service

== Demographics ==
Historical population
Census	Pop.	Note	%±
1910	1,216		—
1920	1,189		−2.2%
1930	2,202		85.2%
1940	2,055		−6.7%
1950	3,222		56.8%
1960	4,410		36.9%
1970	5,294		20.0%
1980	5,033		−4.9%
1990	4,699		−6.6%
2000	5,117		8.9%
2010	4,967		−2.9%
2020	4,473		−9.9%
U.S. Decennial Census

=== 2020 census ===
Tulia racial composition (NH = Non-Hispanic) (Note: Note: the US Census treats Hispanic/Latino as an ethnic category. This table excludes Latinos from the racial categories and assigns them to a separate category. Hispanics/Latinos can be of any race.)
Race	Number	Percentage
White (NH)	1,602	35.81%
Black or African American (NH)	365	8.16%
Native American or Alaska Native (NH)	10	0.22%
Asian (NH)	5	0.11%
Some other race (NH)	8	0.18%
Mixed/multiracial (NH)	105	2.35%
Hispanic or Latino	2,378	53.16%
Total	4,473	

As of the 2020 census, Tulia had a population of 4,473, 1,479 households, and 1,025 families. The median age was 35.6 years; 24.4% of residents were under the age of 18 and 16.5% were 65 years of age or older. For every 100 females there were 119.6 males, and for every 100 females age 18 and over there were 126.3 males age 18 and over.

The population density was 1,257.5 per square mile (485.5/km^{2}). There were 1,821 housing units at an average density of 511.9 per square mile (197.7/km^{2}); 18.8% of those units were vacant, the homeowner vacancy rate was 3.9%, and the rental vacancy rate was 17.0%.

The racial makeup was 51.44% (2,301) white or European American (35.81% non-Hispanic white), 8.7% (389) black or African-American, 0.85% (38) Native American or Alaska Native, 0.11% (5) Asian, 0.02% (1) Pacific Islander or Native Hawaiian, 20.28% (907) from other races, and 18.6% (832) from two or more races. Hispanic or Latino of any race was 53.16% (2,378) of the population.

Of the 1,479 households, 35.0% had children under the age of 18; 45.7% were married couples living together; 16.6% were households with a male householder and no spouse or partner present; and 30.4% were households with a female householder and no spouse or partner present. About 27.4% of all households were made up of individuals and 14.3% had someone living alone who was 65 years of age or older.

24.4% of the population was under the age of 18, 9.8% from 18 to 24, 28.2% from 25 to 44, 21.1% from 45 to 64, and 16.5% who were 65 years of age or older. The median age was 35.6 years. For every 100 females, there were 119.6 males; for every 100 females ages 18 and older, there were 126.3 males.

0.0% of residents lived in urban areas, while 100.0% lived in rural areas.

=== American Community Survey estimates ===
The 2016–2020 5-year American Community Survey estimates show that the median household income was $30,500 (with a margin of error of +/- $4,753). The median family income was $31,419 (+/- $6,378). Males had a median income of $34,476 (+/- $7,351) versus $10,744 (+/- $2,212) for females. The median income for those above 16 years old was $24,115 (+/- $10,197). Approximately, 33.3% of families and 33.6% of the population were below the poverty line, including 49.9% of those under the age of 18 and 18.4% of those ages 65 or over.

The average household size was 2.6 and the average family size was 3.4. The percent of those with a bachelor’s degree or higher was estimated to be 11.4% of the population.

=== 2000 census ===
As of the census of 2000, 5,117 people, 1,698 households, and 1,222 families resided in the city. The population density was 1,447.6 inhabitants per square mile (558.9/km^{2}). The 1,898 housing units averaged 537.0 per square mile (207.3/km^{2}). The racial makeup of the city was 66.45% White, 8.40% African American, 0.43% Native American, 0.10% Asian, 22.14% from other races, and 2.48% from two or more races. Hispanics or Latinos of any race were 39.63% of the population.

Of the 1,698 households, 37.0% had children under 18 living with them, 55.5% were married couples living together, 12.3% had a female householder with no husband present, and 28.0% were not families. About 25.8% of all households were made up of individuals, and 16.3% had someone living alone who was 65 or older. The average household size was 2.64, and the average family size was 3.18.

In the city, the population was distributed as 27.8% under 18, 11.9% from 18 to 24, 25.8% from 25 to 44, 18.7% from 45 to 64, and 15.8% who were 65 or older. The median age was 33 years. For every 100 females, there were 113.1 males. For every 100 females age 18 and over, there were 116.7 males.

The median income for a household in the city was $27,794, and for a family was $32,415. Males had a median income of $24,857 versus $20,000 for females. The per capita income for the city was $12,956. About 16.0% of families and 19.3% of the population were below the poverty line, including 26.7% of those under 18 and 14.9% of those 65 or over.

== Politics ==
Tulia is represented in the U.S. House by Republican Ronny Jackson.

== Education ==
The city is served by the Tulia Independent School District.

Schools that serve Tulia include:

- Tulia High School (grades 9–12)
- Tulia Junior High School (grades 6–8)
- Tulia Elementary School (grades Pre-K-5)

All of Swisher County is in the service area of Amarillo College.

== Media ==
Newspapers

- Swisher County News

== In media ==
A documentary Tulia, Texas: Scenes from the Drug War was filmed by Sarah Kunstler and Emily Kunstler in 2003, and won the Best Documentary Short award at Woodstock Film Festival. Another documentary, titled Tulia, Texas, filmed by Cassandra Herman and Kelly Whalen, premiered in 2008 at the South by Southwest Film Festival in Austin and aired on PBS February 10, 2009.

The Tulia 47 drug sting events were to feature in a film directed by John Singleton and starring Billy Bob Thornton and Halle Berry. The 1999 drug arrests were also explored in the documentary American Drug War: The Last White Hope.

Rattlesnake is a 2019 crime drama mystery film set in Tulia.

== Notable people ==
- Tim Curry, district attorney in Tarrant County, Texas, from 1972 to 2009
- Marshal Dutton, singer and guitarist for the band Hinder
