= Swisher County, Texas =

County in Texas, United States

- County
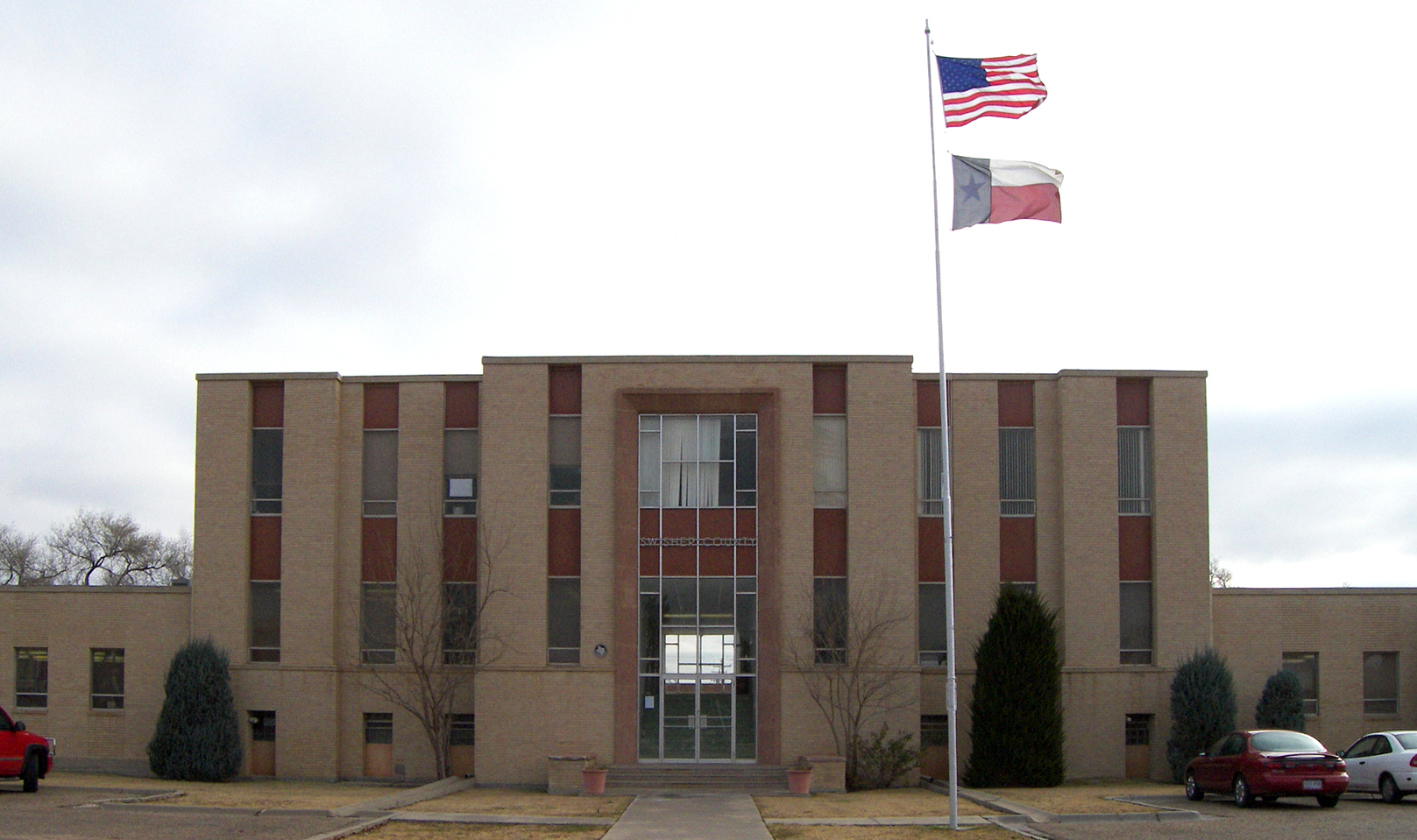
- The Swisher County Courthouse in Tulia

- Location within the U.S. state of Texas
- Coordinates: 34°32′N 101°44′W
- Country: United States
- State: Texas
- Founded: 1890
- Named for: James G. Swisher
- Seat: Tulia
- Largest city: Tulia

Area
  - Total: 901 sq mi (2,330 km^{2})
  - Land: 890 sq mi (2,300 km^{2})
  - Water: 11 sq mi (28 km^{2}) 1.2%

Population (2020)
  - Total: 6,971
  - Estimate (2025): 6,703 ▼
  - Density: 7.8/sq mi (3.0/km^{2})
- Time zone: UTC−6 (Central)
  - Summer (DST): UTC−5 (CDT)
- Congressional district: 19th
- Website: www.co.swisher.tx.us

Swisher County is a county in the U.S. state of Texas. As of the 2020 census, its population was 6,971. Its county seat is Tulia. The county was created in 1876 and later organized in 1890. It is named for James G. Swisher, a soldier of the Texas Revolution and signer of the Texas Declaration of Independence.

At one time, the large JA Ranch, founded by Charles Goodnight and John George Adair, and later owned by Goodnight and Cornelia Adair, reached into six counties, including Swisher.

== History ==
=== Native Americans ===
Apachean cultures roamed the county until Comanche dominated around 1700. The Comanches were defeated by the United States Army in the Red River War of 1874. No significant combat occurred in the county. After the 1874 battle of Palo Duro Canyon, Ranald S. Mackenzie ordered 1450 Indian horses shot. The Buffalo Hunters' War of 1876 was an attempt by the Comanches to drive out the white man and stop depletion of their hunting grounds.

=== County established and growth ===
In 1876 the Texas state legislature carved Swisher County from Young and Bexar districts. The county was organized in 1880, and Tulia, became the county seat.

The area was by and large unsettled until the JA Ranch of Charles Goodnight came in 1883, which added the Tule Ranch.

Although settlers gradually arrived, the county was dominated by ranching the remainder of the 19th century. Good underground water at shallow depths gave to windmills that facilitated the stock-farmer.

In 1906, the Santa Fe Railroad branch line from Amarillo came through the county and later connected the county with Hale County, and with Lubbock by 1910, giving Swisher a major north–south rail line and boosting the economy.

The Great Depression had a devastating effect on the county's economy, somewhat relieved by road work. The stimulus of World War II demand and, particularly, the development of large-scale irrigation in the area, led to the revival of the county's economy.

The first successful extensive local use of underground water from the Ogallala Aquifer came in 1936. After World War II this activity increased dramatically; by the 1980s over 225,000 acres (910 km^{2}) in Swisher County were irrigated.

In 2002 the county had 578 farms and ranches covering 566,429 acres (2,292.26 km^{2}), 69 percent of which were devoted to crops and 30 percent to pasture.

=== The Ozark Trail ===
Rural Texas in the early 20th century was often connected by unpaved routes, often of caliche or other rock and dirt paths. Swisher's road structure fell into this category. In 1920 the Ozark Trail served as a predecessor to today's intra-continental highway structure. The Ozark Trail was a highway network maintained by local entities or private citizens from Arkansas and Missouri through Kansas, Oklahoma, Louisiana, and Texas, to New Mexico. In Texas the trail was made of graded and upgraded roads. Collingsworth, Childress, Hall, Briscoe, Swisher, Castro, and Parmer counties along with Curry and Roosevelt counties in New Mexico raised $10,000 in 1920 to erect markers along already existing roads to mark the Ozark Trail from Oklahoma across Texas to New Mexico. By the mid-1920s Tulia was linked to Nazareth, Dimmitt, and Bovina by State Highway 86, to Canyon and Amarillo by U.S. Highway 385 (now U.S. 87 or Interstate Highway 27), to Silverton by State Highway 80, and to Plainview and Lubbock by U.S. 385.

== Geography ==
According to the U.S. Census Bureau, the county has a total area of 901 square miles (2,330 km^{2}), of which 890 square miles (2,300 km^{2}) is land and 11 square miles (28 km^{2}) (1.2%) is water.

=== Major highways ===
- Interstate 27
- U.S. Highway 87
- State Highway 86
- State Highway 194
- Loop 292

=== Adjacent counties ===
- Randall County (north)
- Armstrong County (northeast)
- Briscoe County (east)
- Floyd County (southeast)
- Hale County (south)
- Castro County (west)

== Demographics ==
Historical population
Census	Pop.	Note	%±
1880	4		—
1890	100		2,400.0%
1900	1,227		1,127.0%
1910	4,012		227.0%
1920	4,388		9.4%
1930	7,343		67.3%
1940	6,528		−11.1%
1950	8,249		26.4%
1960	10,607		28.6%
1970	10,373		−2.2%
1980	9,723		−6.3%
1990	8,133		−16.4%
2000	8,378		3.0%
2010	7,854		−6.3%
2020	6,971		−11.2%
2025 (est.)	6,703	▼	−3.8%
U.S. Decennial Census; 1850–2010 2010 2020

=== 2020 census ===
As of the 2020 census, the county had a population of 6,971. The median age was 38.8 years; 24.4% of residents were under the age of 18 and 18.6% of residents were 65 years of age or older. For every 100 females there were 113.6 males, and for every 100 females age 18 and over there were 116.7 males age 18 and over.

There were 2,490 households in the county, of which 34.2% had children under the age of 18 living in them. Of all households, 50.2% were married-couple households, 17.1% were households with a male householder and no spouse or partner present, and 26.1% were households with a female householder and no spouse or partner present. About 25.5% of all households were made up of individuals and 12.6% had someone living alone who was 65 years of age or older.

There were 3,034 housing units, of which 17.9% were vacant. Among occupied housing units, 68.4% were owner-occupied and 31.6% were renter-occupied. The homeowner vacancy rate was 3.5% and the rental vacancy rate was 14.4%.

The racial makeup of the county was 60.0% White, 6.3% Black or African American, 0.7% American Indian and Alaska Native, 0.2% Asian, <0.1% Native Hawaiian and Pacific Islander, 16.5% from some other race, and 16.3% from two or more races. Hispanic or Latino residents of any race comprised 45.1% of the population.

<0.1% of residents lived in urban areas, while 100.0% lived in rural areas.

=== Racial and ethnic composition ===
Swisher County, Texas – Racial and ethnic composition Note: the US Census treats Hispanic/Latino as an ethnic category. This table excludes Latinos from the racial categories and assigns them to a separate category. Hispanics/Latinos may be of any race.
Race / Ethnicity (NH = Non-Hispanic)	Pop 2010	Pop 2020	% 2010	% 2020
White alone (NH)	4,025	3,219	51.25%	46.18%
Black or African American alone (NH)	552	407	7.03%	5.84%
Native American or Alaska Native alone (NH)	37	18	0.47%	0.26%
Asian alone (NH)	5	10	0.06%	0.14%
Pacific Islander alone (NH)	4	0	0.05%	0.00%
Other Race alone (NH)	6	8	0.08%	0.11%
Mixed Race or Multiracial (NH)	76	162	0.97%	2.32%
Hispanic or Latino (any race)	3,149	3,147	40.09%	45.14%
Total	7,854	6,971	100.00%	100.00%

=== 2000 census ===
As of the census of 2000, there were 8,378 people, 2,925 households, and 2,152 families residing in the county. The population density was 9 people per square mile (3.5 people/km^{2}). There were 3,315 housing units at an average density of 4 units per square mile (1.5 units/km^{2}). The racial makeup of the county was 71.75% White, 5.85% Black or African American, 0.54% Native American, 0.16% Asian, 0.02% Pacific Islander, 19.41% from other races, and 2.28% from two or more races. 35.22% of the population were Hispanic or Latino of any race.

There were 2,925 households, out of which 35.70% had children under the age of 18 living with them, 60.20% were married couples living together, 9.50% had a female householder with no husband present, and 26.40% were non-families. 24.10% of all households were made up of individuals, and 13.80% had someone living alone who was 65 years of age or older. The average household size was 2.65 and the average family size was 3.15.

In the county, the population was spread out, with 27.90% under the age of 18, 10.30% from 18 to 24, 25.50% from 25 to 44, 20.40% from 45 to 64, and 15.90% who were 65 years of age or older. The median age was 35 years. For every 100 females there were 109.20 males. For every 100 females age 18 and over, there were 111.30 males.

The median income for a household in the county was $29,846, and the median income for a family was $34,444. Males had a median income of $25,164 versus $20,448 for females. The per capita income for the county was $14,326. About 14.20% of families and 17.40% of the population were below the poverty line, including 24.20% of those under age 18 and 11.90% of those age 65 or over.

== Communities ==
=== Cities ===
- Kress
- Tulia (county seat)

=== Town ===
- Happy (small part in Randall County)

=== Unincorporated communities ===
- Love
- Vigo Park

== Politics ==
Whereas the counties to its north in the Panhandle proper became overwhelmingly Republican at a Presidential level with Dwight D. Eisenhower in the 1950s, Swisher County continued to favor the Democratic Party for another four decades, even being narrowly won by Walter Mondale in 1984 when he came within 3,819 votes of losing all fifty states. During the twentieth century the only Republicans to carry Swisher County were Herbert Hoover in 1928 due to intense anti-Catholic sentiment against Al Smith, Dwight D. Eisenhower in 1952, and Richard Nixon in 1972.

Like the rest of the Bible Belt, due to opposition to the Democratic Party's liberal positions on social issues Swisher has trended powerfully Republican and in the last six elections the Republican nominee has won more than 64 percent of the vote – over seven percent more than Nixon won in his 3,000-plus-county landslide in 1972.

Swisher County is located within District 88 of the Texas House of Representatives. Swisher County is located within District 31 of the Texas Senate.

United States presidential election results for Swisher County, Texas
Year	Republican		Democratic		Third party(ies)	
Year	No.	%	No.	%	No.	%
1912	23	6.63%	278	80.12%	46	13.26%
1916	62	13.60%	381	83.55%	13	2.85%
1920	148	24.58%	443	73.59%	11	1.83%
1924	212	25.89%	573	69.96%	34	4.15%
1928	887	70.34%	374	29.66%	0	0.00%
1932	166	10.18%	1,448	88.78%	17	1.04%
1936	140	8.77%	1,453	90.98%	4	0.25%
1940	298	17.20%	1,432	82.63%	3	0.17%
1944	331	18.20%	1,275	70.09%	213	11.71%
1948	307	15.03%	1,670	81.78%	65	3.18%
1952	1,843	63.07%	1,074	36.76%	5	0.17%
1956	876	32.64%	1,802	67.14%	6	0.22%
1960	1,310	42.22%	1,777	57.27%	16	0.52%
1964	815	25.23%	2,410	74.61%	5	0.15%
1968	1,177	33.06%	1,760	49.44%	623	17.50%
1972	1,790	57.34%	1,300	41.64%	32	1.02%
1976	753	21.05%	2,811	78.59%	13	0.36%
1980	1,450	43.08%	1,854	55.08%	62	1.84%
1984	1,611	49.40%	1,642	50.35%	8	0.25%
1988	1,271	39.98%	1,893	59.55%	15	0.47%
1992	989	33.54%	1,413	47.91%	547	18.55%
1996	1,159	44.71%	1,224	47.22%	209	8.06%
2000	1,612	64.45%	856	34.23%	33	1.32%
2004	1,487	70.14%	626	29.53%	7	0.33%
2008	1,683	66.39%	813	32.07%	39	1.54%
2012	1,655	72.91%	579	25.51%	36	1.59%
2016	1,671	75.82%	462	20.96%	71	3.22%
2020	1,845	78.31%	478	20.29%	33	1.40%
2024	1,840	81.24%	403	17.79%	22	0.97%

United States Senate election results for Swisher County, Texas1
Year	Republican		Democratic		Third party(ies)	
Year	No.	%	No.	%	No.	%
2024	1,744	78.10%	440	19.70%	49	2.19%

United States Senate election results for Swisher County, Texas2
Year	Republican		Democratic		Third party(ies)	
Year	No.	%	No.	%	No.	%
2020	1,795	77.94%	464	20.15%	44	1.91%

Texas Gubernatorial election results for Swisher County
Year	Republican		Democratic		Third party(ies)	
Year	No.	%	No.	%	No.	%
2022	1,399	83.97%	238	14.29%	29	1.74%

== Education ==
School districts:

- Happy Independent School District
- Kress Independent School District
- Tulia Independent School District

All of the county is in the service area of Amarillo College.

== See also ==
- Dry counties
- List of museums in the Texas Panhandle
- Recorded Texas Historic Landmarks in Swisher County
