= Memphis High School (Texas) =

Location
- 1501 High Street; Memphis, Texas 79245; United States; 34.7354°N 100.5485°W

Information
- School type: Public high school
- School district: Memphis Independent School District
- Principal: Dick Hutcherson
- Staff: 15.58 (on an FTE basis)
- Grades: 9-12
- Enrollment: 137 (2023-2024)
- Student to teacher ratio: 8.79
- Colors: Black & Gold
- Athletics conference: UIL Class AA
- Mascot: Cyclone
- Yearbook: Cyclone
- Website: Memphis High School

Memphis High School is a public high school located in the city of Memphis, Texas, USA and classified as a 2A school by the UIL. It is a part of the Memphis Independent School District located in central Hall County. In 2015, the school was rated "Met Standard" by the Texas Education Agency.

== Athletics ==
The Memphis Cyclones compete in these sports -

Volleyball, Cross Country, Football, Basketball, Powerlifting, Golf, Tennis, Track & Baseball

=== State titles ===
- Boys Basketball -
  - 1949(1A)
- Football -
  - 1991(1A)
- Boys Golf -
  - 1966(1A), 1995(2A), 2002(2A), 2003(1A)
- Girls Golf -
  - 2007(1A), 2012(1A), 2013(1A), 2015(2A)
- Boys Track -
  - 1976(1A)

== Notable alumni ==
- Jack English Hightower (Class of 1944) was a former Democratic U.S. representative from Texas's 13th congressional district.
- Blues Boy Willie (Class of 1964) is an African-American electric blues singer and harmonica player
