= Lakeview, Texas =

- Town
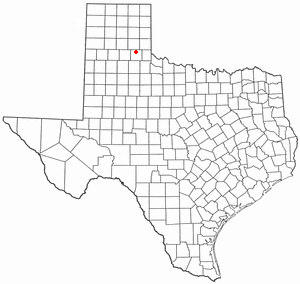
- Location of Lakeview, Texas

- Coordinates: 34°40′22″N 100°41′50″W
- Country: United States
- State: Texas
- County: Hall

Area
  - Total: 0.20 sq mi (0.53 km^{2})
  - Land: 0.20 sq mi (0.53 km^{2})
  - Water: 0 sq mi (0.00 km^{2})
- Elevation: 2,120 ft (650 m)

Population (2020)
  - Total: 60
  - Density: 290/sq mi (110/km^{2})
- Time zone: UTC-6 (Central (CST))
  - Summer (DST): UTC-5 (CDT)
- ZIP code: 79239
- Area code: 806
- FIPS code: 48-40888
- GNIS feature ID: 2412871

Lakeview is a town in Hall County, Texas, United States. The population was 60 at the 2020 census, down from 107 at the 2010 census.

== Geography ==
Lakeview is located along State Highway 256 in north-central Hall County, 10 miles (16 km) southwest of Memphis, the county seat, and 30 miles (48 km) by road southeast of Clarendon.

According to the United States Census Bureau, the town has a total area of 0.2 square miles (50 ha), all land.

== History ==
Lakeview's beginnings are unique as it has occupied two different sites in Hall County. The first site was located near the geographic center of the county on a section of the Southern Pacific Railroad survey in May 1890. A post office and several businesses sprang up at the site. After a failed attempt to become the county seat, most of the homes were sold to farmers and the land reverted to the family of S.L. Lindley. The post office was eventually relocated to the homestead of David H. Davenport, who operated a general store in 1902.

Three years later, Davenport purchased land north of his farm that had a supply of soft water, making it a suitable site to develop a community. On June 11, 1908, he moved his store and post office and platted the second Lakeview site at its present-day location. Prospects for a new railroad grew in 1910, when the Altus, Roswell, and El Paso Company constructed a roadbed through Lakeview, but prevailing conditions forced them to abandon the project. Despite this and two disastrous fires in 1918 and 1919, the community survived. Lakeview was incorporated in 1921. By the late 1920s, the town had several stores and a population exceeding 1,000.

A third fire in 1930 destroyed the business district, and the impact of the Great Depression contributed to Lakeview's decline. A short-lived boom in the late 1940s occurred, but it wasn't enough to revive the town. The First State Bank of Lakeview, in operation since 1908, merged with the First National Bank of Memphis in 1953. By 1980, the population had fallen to 244. That figure declined to 202 in 1990 and 152 in 2000.

On March 5, 2026, an EF3 tornado struck Lakeview, Texas, causing significant damage in the community as part of a regional severe weather outbreak.

== Demographics ==
Historical population
Census	Pop.	Note	%±
1930	375		—
1940	330		−12.0%
1950	287		−13.0%
1960	219		−23.7%
1970	214		−2.3%
1980	244		14.0%
1990	202		−17.2%
2000	152		−24.8%
2010	107		−29.6%
2020	60		−43.9%
U.S. Decennial Census; 2020 Census

As of the census of 2000, there were 152 people, 51 households, and 36 families residing in the city. The population density was 730.1 inhabitants per square mile (281.9/km^{2}). There were 74 housing units at an average density of 355.4 per square mile (137.2/km^{2}). The racial makeup of the town was 45.39% White, 9.21% African American, 43.42% from other races, and 1.97% from two or more races. Hispanic or Latino of any race were 55.26% of the population.

There were 51 households, out of which 45.1% had children under the age of 18 living with them, 54.9% were married couples living together, 13.7% had a female householder with no husband present, and 27.5% were non-families. 25.5% of all households were made up of individuals, and 9.8% had someone living alone who was 65 years of age or older. The average household size was 2.98 and the average family size was 3.70.

In the town, the population was spread out, with 39.5% under the age of 18, 5.3% from 18 to 24, 24.3% from 25 to 44, 19.1% from 45 to 64, and 11.8% who were 65 years of age or older. The median age wes 29 years. For every 100 females, there were 105.4 males. For every 100 females age 18 and over, there were 95.7 males.

The median income for a household in the town was $28,125, and the median income for a family was $29,375. Males had a median income of $26,250 versus $13,750 for females. The per capita income for the town was $10,138. About 31.4% of families and 31.7% of the population were below the poverty line, including 49.1% of those under the age of 18 and none of those 65 and older.

== Education ==
Public education in the town of Lakeview is provided by the Memphis Independent School District. The district's campuses are all located in the city of Memphis.

Lakeview was once a part of the Lakeview Independent School District. Declining student enrollment caused the district to consider consolidating with the larger Memphis Independent School District in 1999. The consolidation of the two districts was made official on July 1, 2000.

Hall County is in the service area of Clarendon College.
