= Estelline, Texas =

Town in Hall County, Texas, United States

- Town
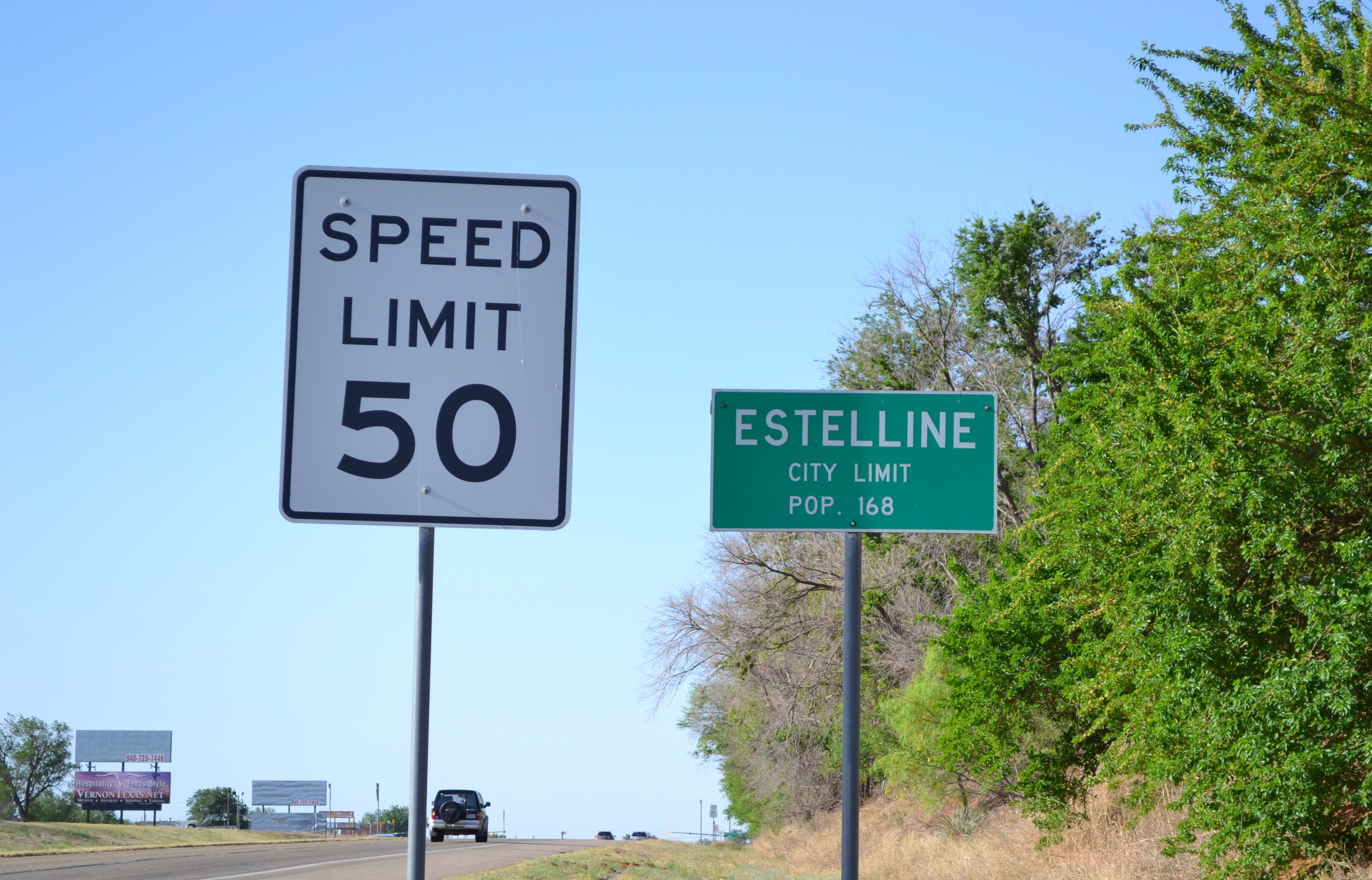
- South on U.S. Route 287 in Estelline, May 2011

- Location in Hall County, Texas
- Coordinates: 34°32′49″N 100°26′24″W
- Country: United States
- State: Texas
- County: Hall
- Settled: 1892
- Incorporated: 1912

Government
  - Type: Council–Manager

Area
  - Total: 0.73 sq mi (1.90 km^{2})
  - Land: 0.73 sq mi (1.90 km^{2})
  - Water: 0 sq mi (0.00 km^{2})
- Elevation: 1,837 ft (560 m)

Population (2020)
  - Total: 121
  - Density: 165/sq mi (63.7/km^{2})
- Time zone: UTC-6 (Central (CST))
  - Summer (DST): UTC-5 (CDT)
- ZIP code: 79233
- Area code: 806
- FIPS code: 48-24636
- GNIS feature ID: 1357080

Estelline is a town located in Hall County, Texas, United States. The population at the 2020 census was 121. In 2012, Estelline was ranked #1 in a National Motorists Association listing of its "Worst Speed Trap Cities" in North America (with a population of less than 50,000). Estelline often refers to itself as the "Town of Estelline", with a "Town Hall" and a "Town Council", rather than the customary "city" label. However, under Texas law, all incorporated municipalities are considered to be cities.

== History ==
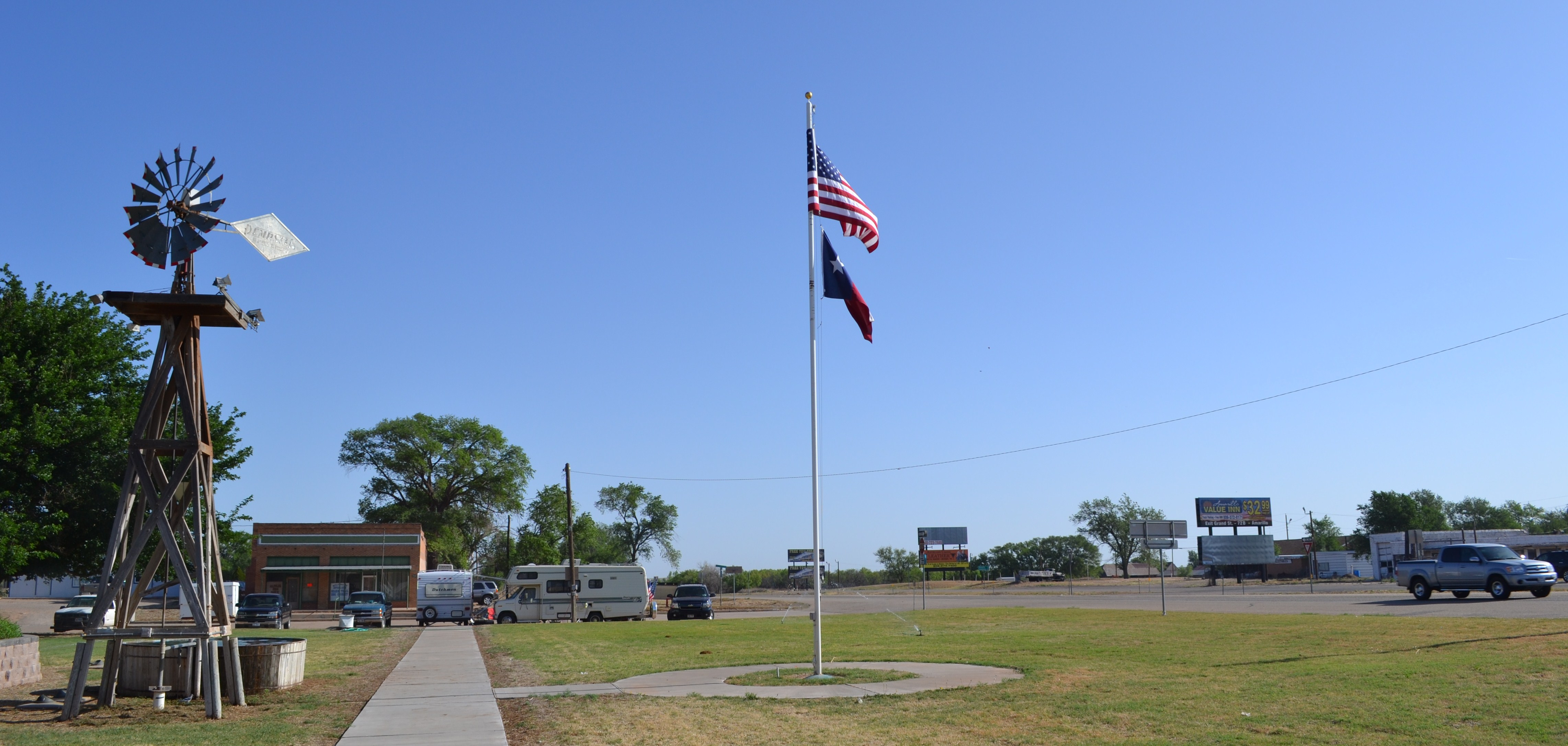
Town Square – Estelline, Texas

Estelline was established in 1892 by the brothers Elam and Math Wright. It was on the Fort Worth and Denver City Railway and was named for Estelle de Shields, daughter of an early settler. The area was originally part of the Diamond Tail Ranch. The Mill Iron range lay nearby, and after 1896 the Continental Land and Cattle Company moved its headquarters to a nearby bluff overlooking the Red River. A post office was opened in May 1892, and by 1894 Estelline had two hotels, a Methodist church, a cotton gin, a livery stable, and a one-room schoolhouse. Tom Macy opened the first store, and soon afterward T. R. Garrott established the Estelline Supply Company. In 1894 Math Wright obtained a depot and sidetrack for his town, and throughout the remainder of the decade Estelline was an important shipping point on the Fort Worth and Denver City line. Cattle from nearby Silverton and Paducah were driven there for shipment. In 1896 the Mill Iron Ranch bought the Estelline Supply Company and opened a large general merchandise store and lumberyard with R. L. Biggerstaff as manager. Two years later Biggerstaff established a private bank, which became the Estelline State Bank in 1905. The town had two newspapers, the Estelline Star (1894–1896) and the Estelline News (1907–1910). A two-story school was built in 1909. In 1912 the citizens of Estelline elected to incorporate with a mayor, a city marshal, and five aldermen. By then the town had attained a population of over 1,000.

The 1920s saw the erection of permanent brick school facilities, the emergence of a champion basketball team, and the organization of a town band conducted by Paul James. In 1927 the railroad began construction of a branch line out of Estelline to Plainview in Hale County. However, the Great Depression led to the closing of the bank and a decline in the population to 603 by 1940. That year two fires destroyed several businesses. Subsequent improvements in highway transportation led to an overall decline in Estelline's importance as a railroad junction town. The number of businesses dropped from fifteen in 1947 to four by 1980, when the population was 258. The town was still incorporated, and the post office remained open.

In 1983, Estelline citizens voted to allow the sale of alcohol beverages. Estelline is the only seller of alcohol beverages within 'dry' Hall County. Estelline has a reputation for being a prominent Texas speed trap and relies on speeders to pay its bills. The Estelline Independent School District was declared dormant in 1987 and students were sent to Memphis schools. Estelline was home to 194 residents in 1990, 168 in 2000 and 145 in 2010. In 2012, the Town Hall was mysteriously gutted by fire. Texas Rangers and the State Fire Marshal have both described the incident as arson. A highly publicized 2013 civil rights case revealed that 89 percent of Estellines 2012 gross revenue came from asset forfeiture and traffic fine revenue.

=== 2013 civil rights case ===
In September 2013, a federal suit was filed by Laura Dutton, alleging that the cities of Estelline and Memphis, former Officer Jayson Fry and Memphis Police Chief Chris Jolly violated her Fourth Amendment rights against illegal search and seizure when she was arrested November 28, 2012, in Estelline on a felony money laundering charge, seizing more than $29,000 from her pickup and keeping $1,400 of her cash. The city maintained no written records of past searches or seizures, yet traffic fines and forfeitures made up more than 89 percent of its gross revenues in fiscal year 2012. The cities and the officers denied her claims, but in July 2014, the city of Estelline and City of Memphis authorities settled with Dutton for $77,500.

=== 2015 police chief arrest ===
Estelline Chief of Police Duwayne Marcolesco surrendered his peace officer license after being charged with official oppression, stemming from an incident on February 9, 2015. Duwayne Marcolesco was arrested after stopping a car while off duty in his personal car in Childress County. The two women in the car that was stopped made an official complaint, and through an investigation the Childress County Sheriff says they discovered Marcolesco was threatening and terrorizing the women. Marcolesco surrendered his peace officer licenses meaning he can no longer work as a peace officer in Texas, and no longer is the chief of police in Estelline.

=== 2017 police chief arrest ===
On the night of June 1, 2017, Estelline Police Chief Leigh Weiser was arrested for alleged sexual activity with a person in custody, according to the Texas Department of Public Safety. The case was handled by the Texas Rangers. Weiser was arraigned on a charge of violation of civil rights of person in custody, by improper sexual activity, as defined by the Article 39.04 Texas Penal Code. Weiser was indicted by Childress County in November 2017 and his peace officer status was revoked in June, 2018.

== Geography ==
Estelline is located at the junction of U.S. Highway 287 and State Highway 86 in east central Hall County, approximately 14 miles southeast of Memphis and 15 miles northwest of Childress. The nearest major city is Amarillo, located 102 miles northwest of Estelline. According to the United States Census Bureau, the town has a total area of 0.7 square miles (1.8 km^{2}), all land.

== Weather and climate ==
A diagram of tornado alley based on 1 tornado or more per decade. Rough location (red), and its contributing weather systems

According to the Köppen Climate Classification system, Estelline has a semi-arid climate, abbreviated "BSk" on climate maps.

Estelline, Texas is often referred to as being located at the core of Tornado Alley. Over the years, the location(s) of Tornado Alley have not been clearly defined. No official definition of 'tornado alley' or the geographical area of tornado alley has ever been designated by the National Weather Service Thus, differences of location are the result of the different criteria used.

According to the National Severe Storms Laboratory FAQ, "Tornado Alley" is a term used by the media as a reference to areas that have higher numbers of tornadoes. A study of 1921–1995 tornadoes concluded almost one-fourth of all significant tornadoes occur in this area.

On March 10, 2007, a brief, non-mesocyclonic tornado embedded inside a downburst completely collapsed two old brick buildings, blew in doors and windows, and destroyed a mobile home in the area. The tornado was rated EF1 on the Enhanced Fujita scale.

== Demographics ==
Historical population
Census	Pop.	Note	%±
1920	394		—
1930	950		141.1%
1940	603		−36.5%
1950	464		−23.1%
1960	346		−25.4%
1970	301		−13.0%
1980	258		−14.3%
1990	194		−24.8%
2000	168		−13.4%
2010	145		−13.7%
2020	121		−16.6%
U.S. Decennial Census; 2020 Census

As of the census of 2010, there were 145 people, 54 households, and 30 families residing in the city. The population density was 195 inhabitants per square mile (75/km^{2}). There were 54 occupied housing units and 30 vacant housing units. The racial makeup of the city was 84.8% White, 4.8% African American, 0.0% Native American, 9.7% from other races, and 0.7% from two or more races. Hispanic or Latino of any race were 51.7% of the population.

There were 54 households, out of which 24.1% had children under the age of 18 living with them, 46.3% were married couples living together, 5.6% had a female householder with no husband present, and 44.4% were non-families. 42.6% of all households were made up of individuals, and 33.3% had someone living alone who was 65 years of age or older. The average household size was 2.69 and the average family size was 4.00.

In the city the population was spread out, with 31.5% under the age of 18, 4.8% from 20 to 24, 2.1% from 25 to 29, 4.1% from 30 to 34, 6.2% from 35 to 39, 8.9% from 40 to 49, 19.3% from 50 to 59, 4.1% from 60 to 64 and 13.8% who were 65 years of age or older. The median age was 32.5 years. A total of 74.0 females and a total of 71.0 males reside in the city. 52.0 females and 47.0 males were 18 years of age or older.

The median income for a household in the city was $16,667, and the median income for a family was $33,019. Males had a median income of $28,750 versus $18,125 for females. The per capita income for the city was $26,035. About 40.4% of the population were below the poverty line.

Educational attainment: percent high school graduate or higher was 57.1%.

== Education ==
The town of Estelline is served by the Memphis Independent School District located approximately 14 miles (23 km) miles northwest in Memphis, Texas. It was a part of the Estelline Independent School District until July 1, 1989, when it merged into Memphis ISD.

Hall County is in the service area of Clarendon College. Clarendon College – Childress Center is located approximately 15 miles Southeast in Childress, Texas. Clarendon College is a community college located in Clarendon, the seat of Donley County in the Texas Panhandle. The College operates branch campuses in Pampa and Childress.

== Government ==
John Cornyn III is a Republican member of the United States Senate. U.S. Senator Cornyn has served since 2002 and succeeded in his reelection in 2008, 2014, and again in 2020. He is Senate Majority Whip. He won the March 2014 Republican primary with 59% of the vote and the 2020 Republican primary with 76% of the vote.

William McClellan Thornberry, known as Mac Thornberry, was the U.S. representative from the Texas Panhandle. He served from 1995, when the House seated its first Republican majority in forty years, through 2021.

A Republican, Thornberry represented Texas's 13th congressional district, a GOP stronghold which stretches between the Oklahoma and New Mexico borders. It winds across the Panhandle into the South Plains, then runs east across the Red River Valley. Covering over 40,000 square miles (100,000 km^{2}), it is the second-largest district geographically in Texas and one of the largest (excluding at-large districts in Wyoming, Montana, and Alaska) in the country. It is even larger in area than thirteen states. The principal cities in the district are Amarillo and Wichita Falls.

Kelton Gray Seliger, known as Kel Seliger is a Republican member of the Texas State Senate representing District 31, which stretches from the Panhandle to the Permian Basin.

Republican Drew Springer, Jr., a businessman from Muenster in Cooke County, has since January 2013 represented Estelline in the Texas House of Representatives.

== Speed trap ==
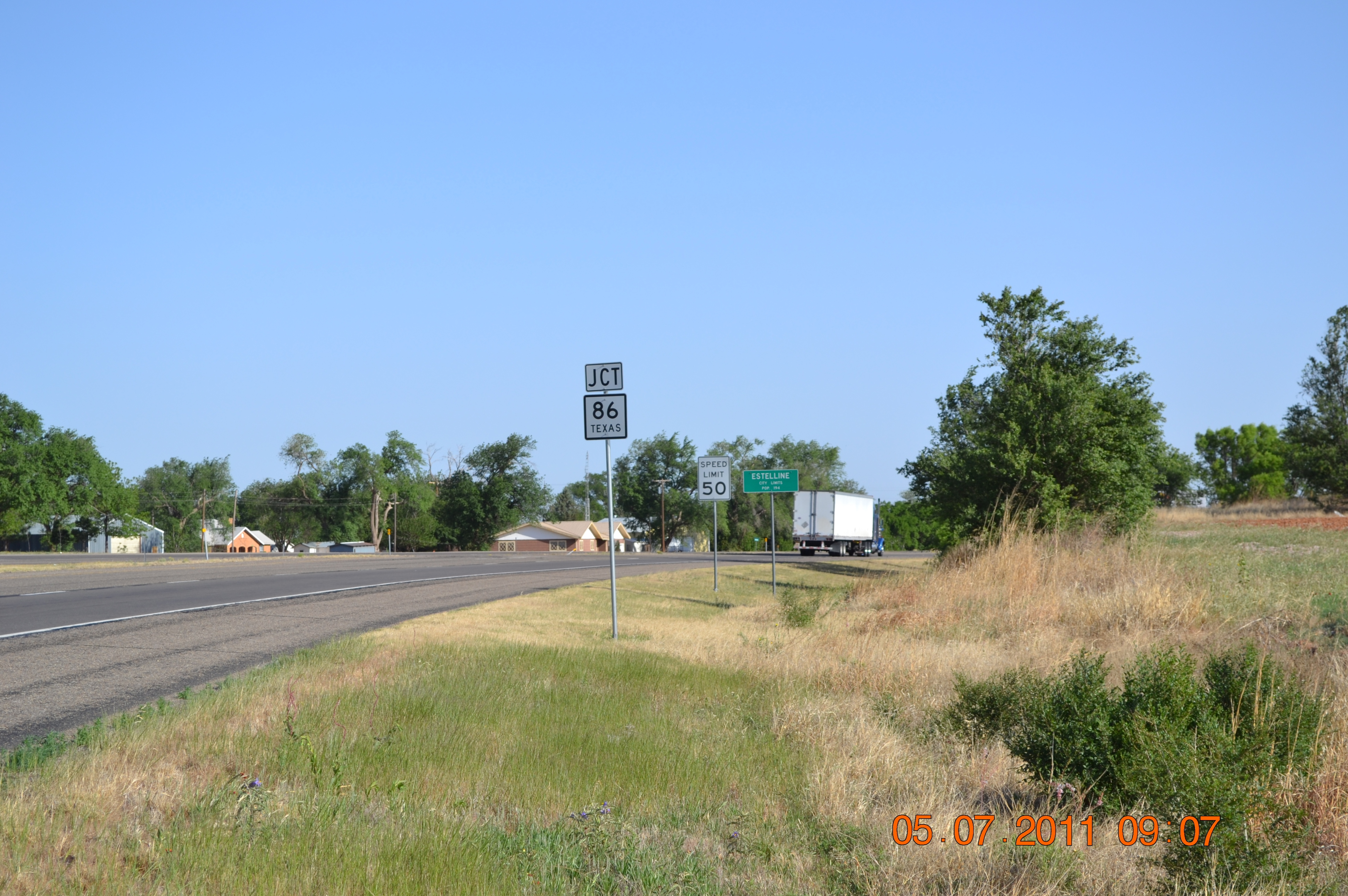
Northbound (blind curve)

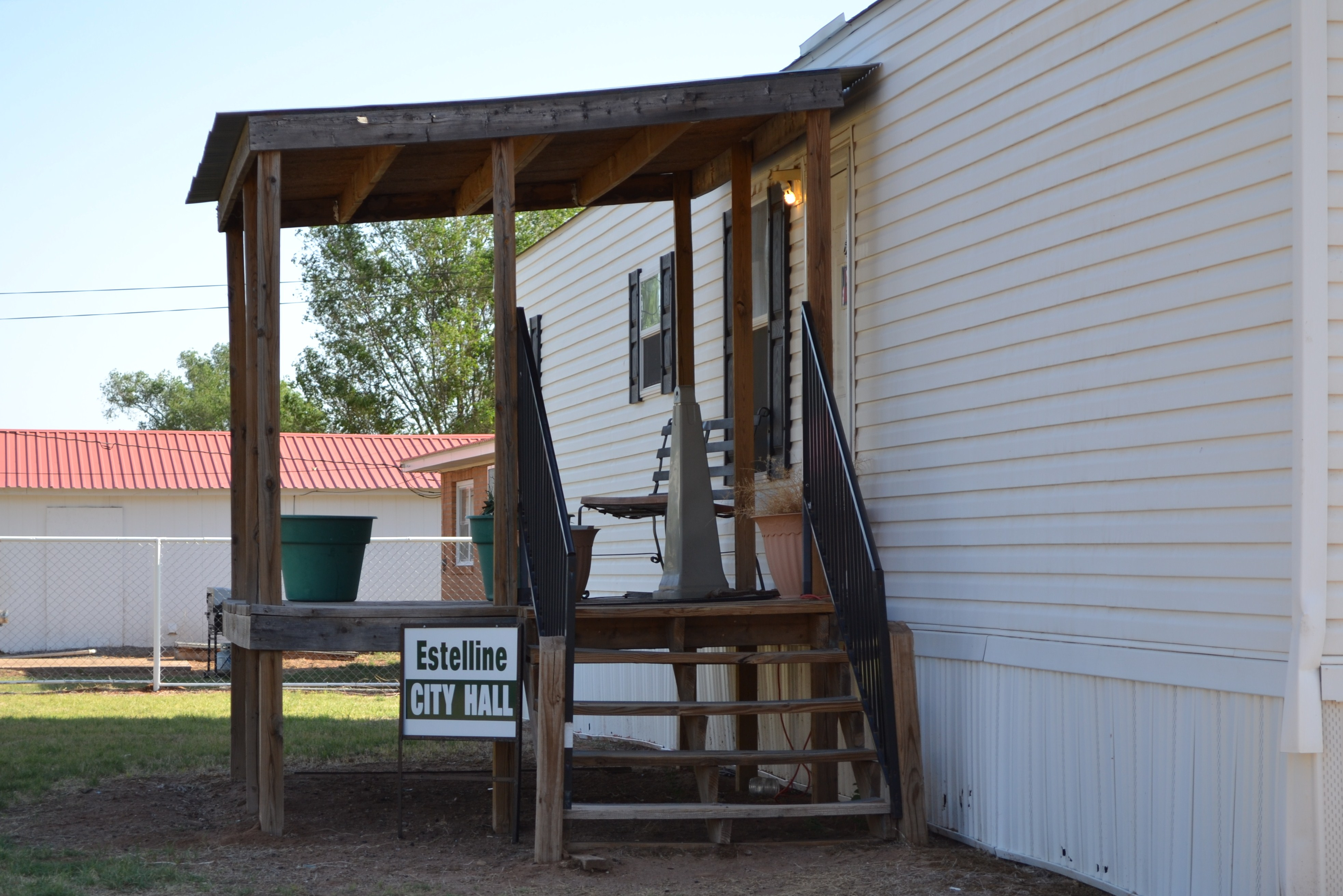
Estelline City Hall

Estelline has a reputation for being a prominent Texas speed trap. In 2012, Estelline was ranked #1 in a National Motorists Association listing of its "Worst Speed Trap Cities" in North America (with a population of less than 50,000). Estelline has a one-person police force whose main purpose is to wait for speeders. A 2013 civil rights case revealed that 89 percent of Estelline's 2012 gross revenue came from asset forfeiture. Furthermore, Estelline relies on speeders to pay its bills. From 2000 through 2009, Estelline had the second highest traffic fine revenue per citizen in Texas, more than 300% the per citizen revenue of third place Domino.

State officials audited Estelline in 1999 and 2003, finding in the earlier instance that the town owed the state $15,025 in excess traffic fines.

A 2013 civil rights case revealed that the city of Estelline is paying off a substantial debt for unpaid traffic fine revenues that it was supposed to pay into the state's coffers. The city owed the state $600,000 for the state's share of traffic ticket income in 2006 and 2007, but reduced its back debt to about $300,000 as of March 2014, and is paying roughly $10,000 a month to pay it off.

== Events ==
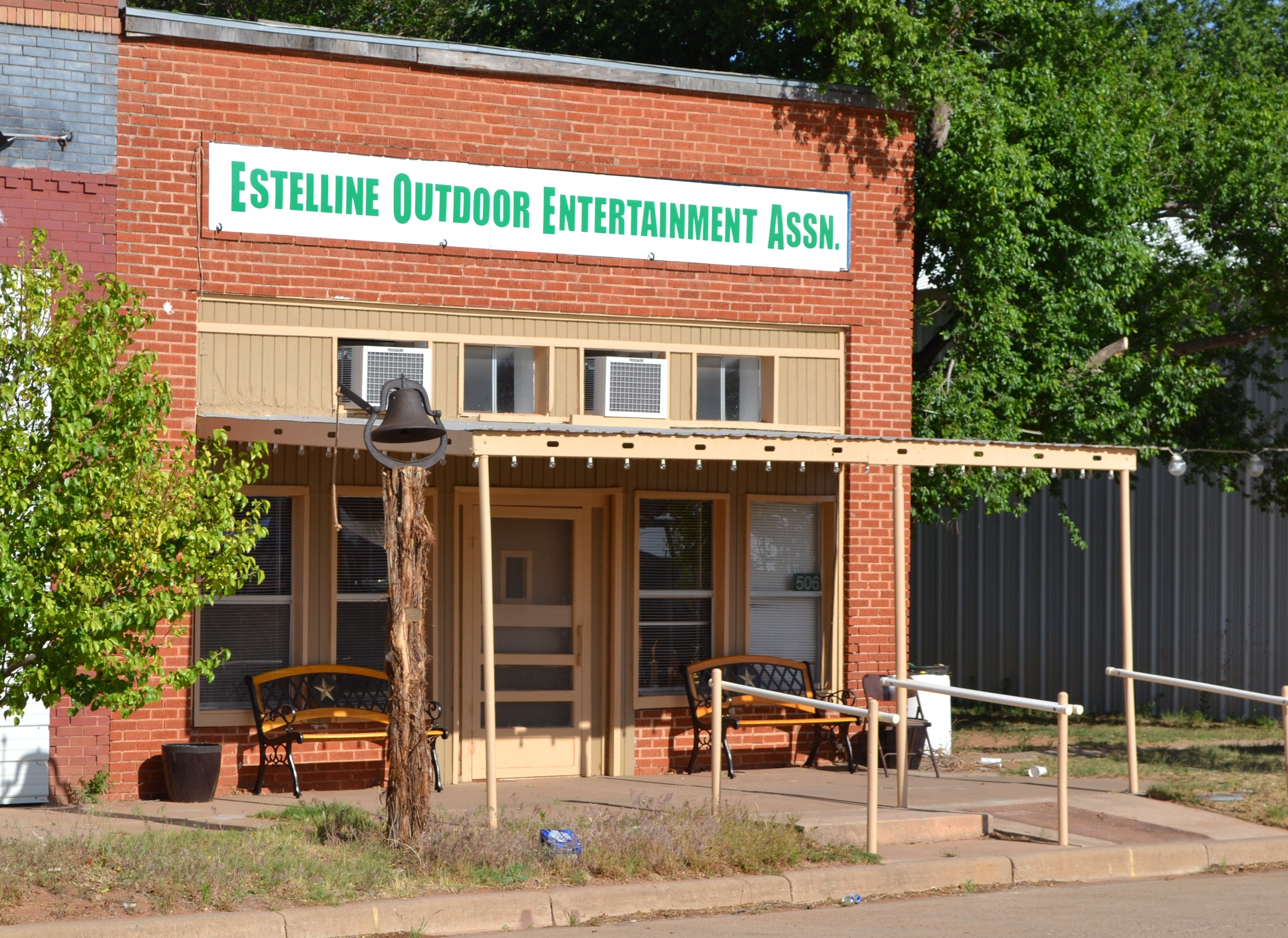
Estelline Outdoor Entertainment Association

The Estelline Outdoor Entertainment Association is a non-profit organization that works to provide entertainment and establish work programs. Previous events include the Annual Red River Festival & Motorcycle Rally; and the Annual Texas State Barbecue Championship competition, known as the Ozark Trail Barbecue Cook-off.

== Media ==
=== Radio ===
- KZES-FM 91.3 FM
- KCTX-AM 1510 AM
- KCTX-FM 96.1 FM
- KLSR-FM 105.3 FM

=== Newspaper ===
- The Hall County Herald
- The Red River Sun
- Clarendon Enterprise
- Amarillo Globe-News
- Lubbock Avalanche-Journal

=== Television ===
- KACV-TV
- KVII-TV
- KAMR-TV
- KFDA-TV
- KCIT

== See also ==
- List of municipalities in Texas
