= Memphis Independent School District =

School district in Texas

Memphis Independent School District is a public school district based in Memphis, Texas, United States.

Located in Hall County, the district also serves the towns of Estelline and Lakeview. Small portions of the district extend into Childress, Collingsworth, and Donley Counties.

In 2009, the school district was rated "recognized" by the Texas Education Agency.

== History ==
On July 1, 1989, Memphis ISD annexed Estelline Independent School District, which became dormant in 1987. On July 1, 2000 Lakeview Independent School District consolidated into Memphis ISD. The Lakeview merger occurred after voters in both the Memphis and Lakeview districts agreed to a merge: 232 of 239 participants residing in Memphis ISD voted to merge.

== Schools ==
- Memphis High School (grades 9–12)
- Memphis Middle School (grades 6–8)
- Austin Elementary School (grades 3–5)
- Travis Elementary School (prekindergarten-grade 2)
