= Estelline =

Estelline can refer to:

- Estelline, South Dakota
- Estelline, Texas
