= D.C. Hall =

D.C. Hall can either refer to

- Warren D. C. Hall - American and Mexican lawyer, pioneer, and soldier
- David Hall (runner) - Oklahoma basketball coach (sometimes referred to as D.C. Hall)
