= KLSR =

KLSR may refer to:

- KLSR-FM, a radio station (105.3 FM) licensed to Memphis, Texas, United States
- KLSR-TV, a television station (channel 34) licensed to Eugene, Oregon, United States
