= Tell, Texas =

- unincorporated community
- Location within the state of Texas Tell (the United States)
- Coordinates: 34°22′33″N 100°23′41″W
- Country: United States
- State: Texas
- County: Childress
- Elevation: 1,903 ft (580 m)
- Time zone: UTC-6 (Central (CST))
  - Summer (DST): UTC-5 (CDT)
- ZIP codes: 79259
- GNIS feature ID: 1369695

Tell is an unincorporated community in southwestern Childress County, Texas, United States. According to the Handbook of Texas, the community had a population of 15 in 2000.

== History ==
1887 saw the founding of Tell. Tell-Tale Flat was the subsequent name after Lee. Belle Garrison, the postmistress, opened the first post office in her dugout home in 1888. Federal postal officials abbreviated the name to Tell in 1905. The following year, Jim Fox had a grocery and drugstore, R. A. Hawkins constructed the first cotton gin, and Richard A. Sandifer operated a general store. Four churches and numerous other businesses had been founded by 1916. The Tell State Bank was in operation from 1916 to 1934, when it amalgamated with the Childress State Bank. Tell gradually lost most of its enterprises to other factors and improved transportation facilities. Tell operated two churches, a store, and a cotton gin by 1984. The population declined throughout the rest of the 20th century and ended at 15 in 2000. Its population in 1984 was 59, which went up to 63 in 1990. The population was reported as 32 in 2010, then 20 in 2019.

Although it is unincorporated, Tell has a post office with the ZIP code 79259.

== Geography ==
Tell is located at the intersection of Farm to Market Roads 2042 and 94, 12 mi (19 km) southwest of Childress and 13 mi (21 km) south of Estelline in southwestern Childress County.

== Education ==
Janie Roberts taught at the first school in Tell that was located south of where the community currently stands. It moved here in 1912 and was notable for its baseball team, which would win a lot of championships. After it joined the Childress Independent School District in 1963, the original school building became a community center.

== Notable person ==
Walt Faulkner, who in 1950 became the first rookie to win the pole position for the Indianapolis 500, was born in Tell and lived there for the first two-and-one-half years of his life.
