= Arlie, Texas =

Ghost town in Texas, US

- Ghost town
- Location in Texas
- Coordinates: 34.7178364°N 100.0909419°W
- Country: United States
- State: Texas
- County: Childress
- Elevation: 1,770 ft (540 m)

Arlie is a ghost town in Childress County, Texas, United States. Founded in early 1888, early settler Arlie Griffith Weddingtoncis its namesake. In June, a post office opened, which changed its name to Loco in 1930 and closed in December 1964. An agricultural community, it was given its own school district in 1901. Roadway improvement caused its decline, and the community was abandoned by the 1980s.
