= Lakeview Independent School District =

School district in Texas

Coordinates: 44.6221°N 95.6653°W

Lakeview Independent School District was a school district headquartered in Lakeview in Hall County, Texas.

Declining student enrollment caused the district to consider consolidating with the larger Memphis Independent School District in 1999. An election was held on August 14 of that year. In order for the consolidation process to move forward, voters in both districts would have to approve the measure. Of the 59 votes cast in Lakeview ISD, 49 (83.1%) favored consolidation. In Memphis, 232 of 239 (97.1%) approved.

On July 1, 2000 it merged into the Memphis Independent School District.

== Schools ==
- Lakeview Elementary School
- Lakeview Junior High School
- Lakeview High School
