= Radie Britain =

American composer (1899–1994)

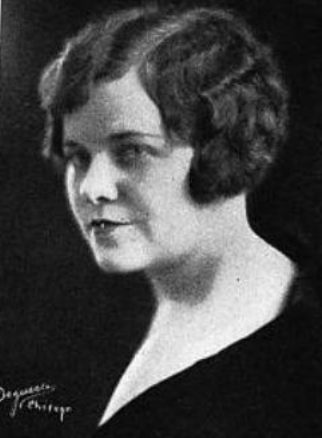
- Radie Britain, from a 1927 publication
- Born: March 17, 1899; Silverton, Texas, U.S.
- Died: May 23, 1994 (aged 95); Palm Desert, California, U.S.
- Occupations: Composer, musician, music educator

Radie Britain (March 17, 1899 – May 23, 1994) was an American composer, pianist, writer and music educator.

== Life ==
=== Early life and education ===
Radie Britain was born near Silverton, Texas, the third child of Edgar Charles and Katie (Ford) Britain. Her unusual first name was reportedly her mother's choice, as Britain described in her autobiography, with her mother stating, "I wished to call you Radie. It's a strong name, and you will make it stronger by making a name for yourself."

In 1905, the Britain family moved to a ranch near Clarendon, Texas, to be closer to education opportunities for the children. From a young age, Radie Britain took piano lessons with a local teacher, Miss Wedgewood, who had graduated from the Dresden Conservatory in Germany. Katie Britain had taken some music lessons on the organ in her younger years, and Edgar was able to play fiddle square dance tunes on the violin and frequently sang "cowboy tunes" at the top of his lungs, but despite the fact that they were not musicians by trade, Britain's parents took music education very seriously. Radie was required to practice for several hours a day and quickly became a skilled pianist.

Sometime around 1911, Britain began studying piano at Clarendon College in Texas with R. Deane Shure who had studied music at the Leipzig Conservatory. He was a highly supportive teacher who believed Britain would have a long career in music as long as "she did not marry too early." Britain was a hard-working student, taking her lessons at 7:30am to allow her to get to high school classes on time. By the time she was 15, Britain was enrolled in advanced harmony classes at Clarendon alongside collegiate students, although Britain claimed the sudden jump in her music theory studies actually did more harm than good in the long run.

In 1917, just before Radie started her senior year of high school, the Britain family moved once again to a ranch near the Palo Duro Canyon, close to Amarillo, Texas. Radie, however, stayed in Clarendon in the college dormitory to avoid interrupting her education. This allowed her a greater amount of freedom than she had previously experienced, thanks to her family's strict Methodist attitudes. Britain was frequently in and out of trouble with the Clarendon administration, as she broke rules against both speaking to male students outside of mealtimes and dancing. The latter almost caused her expelled from Clarendon after she and several other students were caught dancing to a ragtime record in an empty classroom.

After her graduation from Clarendon College in 1918, Britain returned to her family in Amarillo for the summer. She spent her time attempting to convince her parents, especially her father, that she should be allowed to leave Texas and continue her musical studies at a major music conservatory, many of which were located on the East Coast of the United States during this time. During the same summer, Britain was scouted out by a staff member of Crescent College in Arkansas, an all-girls finishing school, who believed she would be a good fit as a student. According to Britain, adventuring to Arkansas was her chance to prove to her father that it was not a bad idea for her to leave home to pursue her further musical instruction.

=== Continuing education ===
During her time at Crescent College, Britain took lessons in both piano and organ with Dr. Arthur Sherubel, the music professor at the school. Sherubel, like Britain's earlier teachers, was supportive and believed Britain would be successful as a musician. At the end of the school year, Britain received a diploma after performing a recital consisting of compositions by Chopin, Beethoven, Mendelssohn, and Bach.

When Britain returned home to Amarillo once more, she discovered her mother had convinced her father to allow her to travel north to continue her education. Although she would rather have attended Wellesley College in Boston due to already having a friend in attendance, Britain's father believed she would be more focused if she traveled somewhere where she knew no one. In the fall of 1919, Britain took a train north to Chicago to study piano at the American Conservatory with Heniot Levy, graduating with a Bachelor of Music degree in piano in 1921. During this time, she attended her very first orchestral concert, a performance of Beethoven's Fifth Symphony by the Chicago Symphony Orchestra led by conductor Frederick Stock. She finished her first year and her teacher's certificate with high honors, earning a "Special Honorable Mention" in piano, a "Gold Medal" in organ, and an "Honorable Mention" in pedagogy.

After her first year in Chicago, Britain returned home for the summer to visit her family. Her father believed she should consider her education complete, but Britain was determined to return to the conservatory and earn a full degree. However, Britain was offered a position teaching music history and piano while also serving as the organist for the local Methodist church. She also maintained a private teaching studio in Amarillo.

In 1922 she studied with organist Pietro Yon in Dallas, who furthered Britain's desire to travel to Europe to continue her musical education. She made the arrangements, and by 1923 was studying with Marcel Dupré in Paris. Britain left Paris the next year for a three week tour of Italy, then returned to Amarillo once more. She then left for Germany in 1924, where she took lessons with Adele Aus der Ohe in Berlin and Albert Noelte in Munich who encouraged her to pursue composition. Britain's relationship with Noelte was complex; in her memoirs, she reported him as making multiple romantic advances, which she rebuffed. However, she also quoted him as stating, "My Dear. You have a greater flair for original melodies than I do. I have superior knowledge theoretically. I promise to stand by you until you can stand on your own two feet alone, even if it takes ten years."

Noelte encouraged Britain to take a metaphysical approach to composition, instructing her to talk walks in the German forest where she "felt the vibrations of the woods."

=== Professional career ===
Britain made her debut as a composer in Munich in May 1926. She returned to Texas after the death of her sister, and later taught at the Girvin Institute of Music and Allied Arts in Chicago. She composed orchestral works in the tradition of German post-romanticism during these years.

Britain's Heroic Poem (1929) won the Juilliard National Publication Prize in 1945, making her the award's first female winner. (Note: Radie received her award in 1945, substantiated by an extant announcement letter dating from June 8, 1945. Her award is commonly misreported as dating to 1930, possibly to due an early misprint, see Macdonald 2012, p. 27) With the assistance from the Federal Music Project, her works were played by symphony orchestras for a decade. She married Chicago businessman Leslie Edward Moeller in 1930 and had a daughter Lerae in 1932. Britain spent the summers of 1935 and 1936 at the famed MacDowell Colony. The couple divorced in 1939, and she moved to Hollywood, California, and married Italian sculptor Edgardo Simone in 1940. In 1941, Britain settled in Hollywood, continued career as Texas composer, and received international or national awards. She was given an honorary doctorate by the Musical Arts Conservatory in Amarillo in 1958. After Simone died in 1949, Britain wrote an unpublished autobiographical novel, Bravo, based on her relationship with him. She married aviation pioneer Theodore Morton in 1959. She died in Palm Desert, California, and her papers are housed at several locations.

== Works ==
Britain incorporated musical idioms from the southwestern United States into her compositions. According to a letter she wrote in 1989, Britain composed 257 works, including 55 pieces for orchestra. Selected orchestral works include:

- Angel Chimes
- Brothers of the Clouds with TTBB chorus
- The Builders with SATB chorus
- Cactus Rhapsody
- Chicken in the Rough
- Chipmunks for woodwinds, harp, percussion
- Cosmic Mist Symphony, dedicated to her 3rd husband Theodore Morton
- Cowboy Rhapsody
- Drouth
- The Earth Does Not Wish for Beauty with SATB chorus
- Earth of God (String Orchestra)
- Les Fameux Douze The Famous Twelve for small orchestra
- Four Sarabandes for small orchestra
- Franciscan Sketches
- San Luis Rey
- Saint Francis of Assisi
- Heroic Poem
- Infant Suite
- In Living Ecstasy with solo voice
- Jewels of Lake Tahoe
- Kambu
- Lament with solo violin
- Little per cent
- Minha Terra
- Mother: A Melody of Love with narrator
- Nisan with SATB chorus
- Withered Flowers, song
