= Texas State Highway 86 =

State highway in Texas

State Highway 86
- SH 86 highlighted in red

Route information
- Maintained by TxDOT
- Length: 149.37 mi (240.39 km)
- Existed: 1923–present

Major junctions
- West end: US 60 at Bovina
- US 385 at Dimmitt; I-27 at Tulia; US 87 at Tulia
- East end: US 287 at Estelline

Location
- Country: United States
- State: Texas

Highway system
- Highways in Texas; Interstate; US; State; Former; Toll; Loops; Spurs; FM/RM; Park; Rec
← SH 85	→ US 87

State Highway 86 (SH 86) is a state highway in the U.S. state of Texas that runs 149 miles (240 km) from Texico to Estelline. This route was designated on August 21, 1923 as the renumbered SH 5A. On September 17, 1923, the section from Estelline to Turkey was cancelled, as SH 18 extended northeast from Turkey to Memphis. By 1929, it was shortened to Bovina, as it was constructed on that route, instead. It has travelled its present course since then, except for the addition of the northern portion of SH 18 between Turkey and Estelline on December 22, 1936.

== Junction list ==
County	Location	mi	km	Destinations	Notes
Parmer	Bovina			US 60	
Parmer				SH 214	
Castro	Dimmitt			US 385	
Swisher	Tulia			I-27	I-27 exit 74.
Swisher	Tulia			US 87	
Briscoe	Silverton			SH 207	
Briscoe				SH 256	
Hall	Turkey			SH 70	
Hall	Estelline			US 287	
1.000 mi = 1.609 km; 1.000 km = 0.621 mi

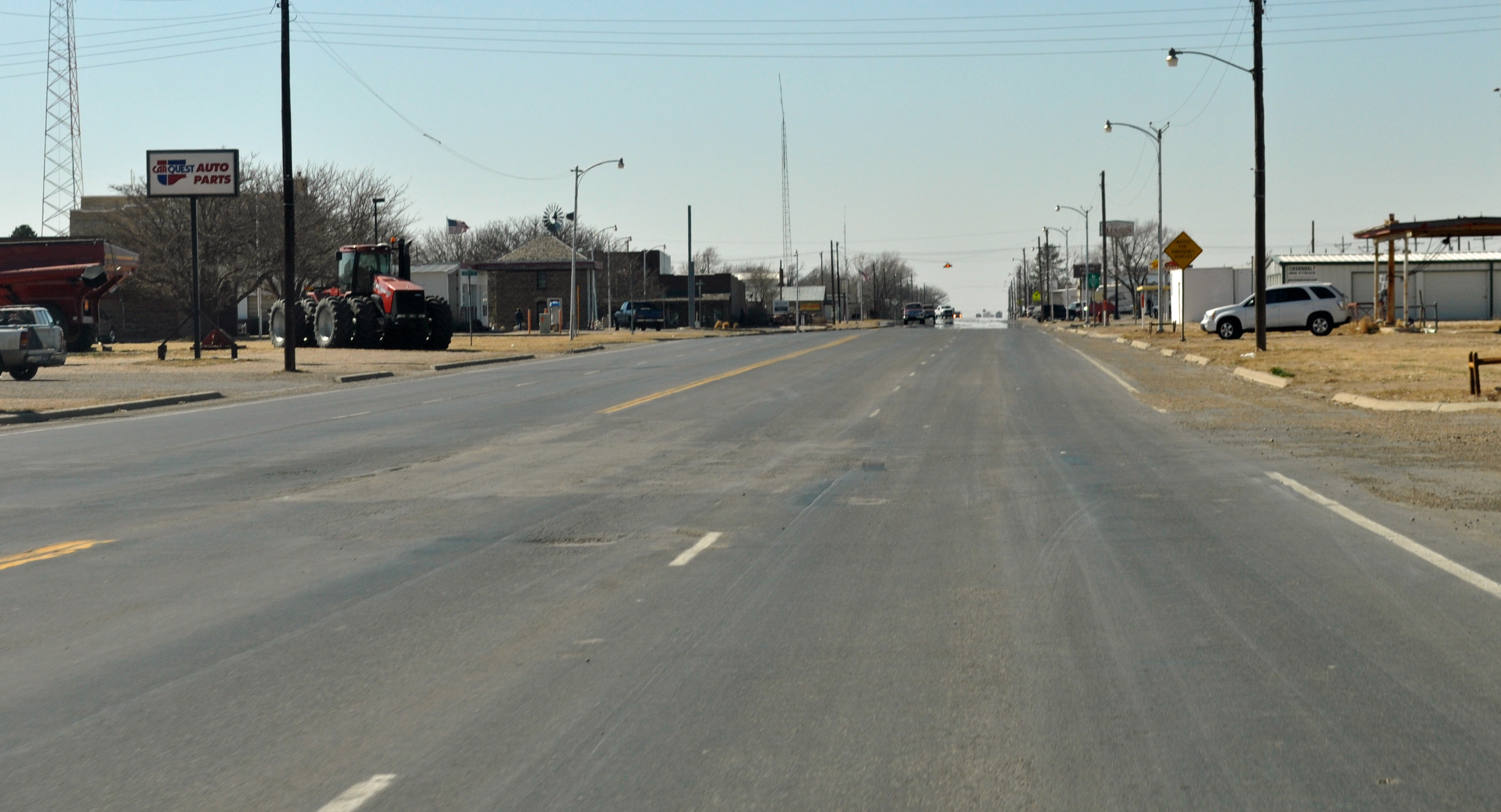
SH 86 in Silverton

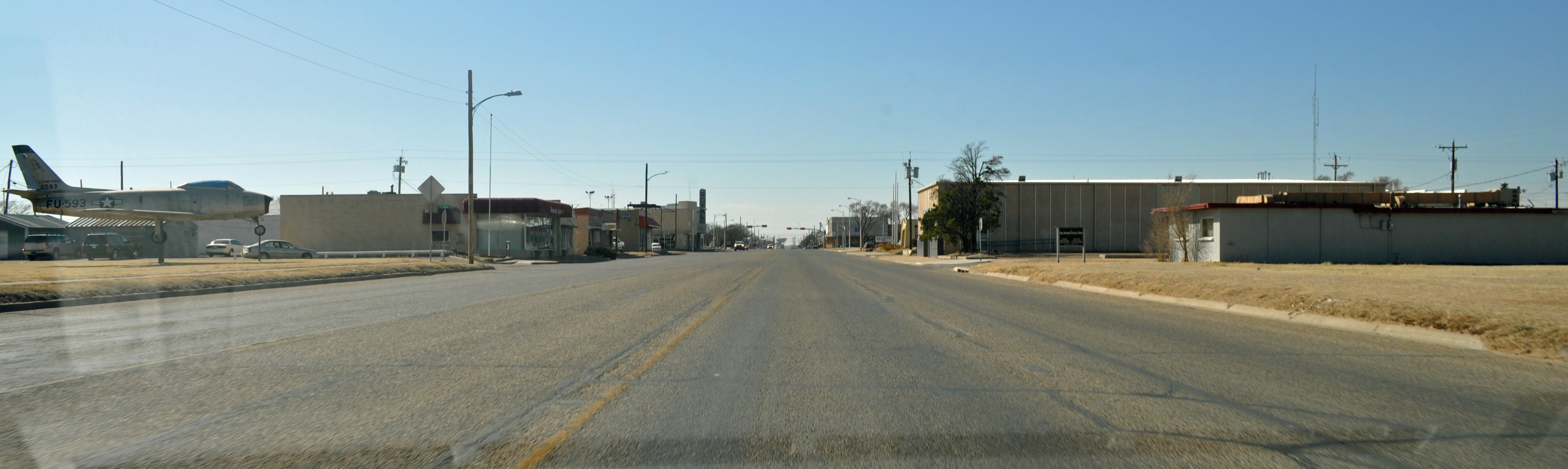
SH 86 in Tulia

== See also ==
- Midway Drive-In (Texas)
