= Lou Wills Hildreth =

American Southern gospel performer (1928–2019)

- Born: Lou Wills; July 13, 1928; Memphis, Texas, U.S.
- Died: February 28, 2019 (aged 90); Mount Pleasant, Texas, U.S.
- Occupations: Singer-songwriter, talent agent, television host

Lou Wills Hildreth (July 13, 1928 – February 28, 2019) was an American Southern gospel performer, songwriter, talent agent and television host. She was the first woman to have owned a talent agency in the Southern gospel industry as the president of the Nashville Talent Agency. She was inducted into the Gospel Music Hall of Fame and the Southern Gospel Museum and Hall of Fame.

== Early life ==
Hildreth was born on July 13, 1928, in Memphis, Texas. Her family, the Wills, were Southern gospel performers.

== Career ==
Hildreth began her career as a Southern gospel performer with her family, the Singing Wills Family. In the 1960s, she hosted Wills Family Inspirational Time. Over the course of her career, she has also hosted Hill Country Gospel TV and Inside Gospel, Family Lifestyles and Nashville Gospel.

Hildreth was a songwriter. She was the founder and owner of the Nashville Talent Agency, a talent agency based in Nashville, Tennessee. As such, she was "the first female to have owned her own booking agency" in the Gospel music industry. Her clients included Mark Lowry and The Hemphills among others. She was also the co-owner of the Sword & Shield Recording & Publishing Company.

Hildreth served on the board of directors of the Gospel Music Association for two decades. She was inducted into the Gospel Music Hall of Fame in 2005, and the Southern Gospel Museum and Hall of Fame in 2007. She is the namesake of the Lou Hildreth Award at the National Quartet Convention. Lou Hildereth received an Honorary Doctorate in Music from Louisiana Baptist University.

== Personal life ==
Hildreth was married to Howard Hildreth for 72 years. They leave behind a son, David, and a daughter, Kathryn. Howard died December 26, 2018. Lou died two months and two days after her husband.
