= Texas State Highway 256 =

State highway in Texas

State Highway 256
- SH 256, highlighted in red

Route information
- Maintained by TxDOT
- Length: 61.615 mi (99.160 km)
- Existed: 1937–present

Major junctions
- West end: SH 86 / SH 207 in Silverton
- US 287 in Memphis
- East end: US 83 south of Wellington

Location
- Country: United States
- State: Texas

Highway system
- Highways in Texas; Interstate; US; State; Former; Toll; Loops; Spurs; FM/RM; Park; Rec
← SH 255	→ SH 257

State Highway 256 (SH 256) is a state highway that runs from Silverton in northern Texas east to a junction with US 83 near Wellington, close to the Oklahoma state line.

== History ==
SH 256 was first designated on November 5, 1937, from Silverton to Memphis. On September 20, 1938, SH 256 was extended to Plainview. On May 19, 1942, the section from Plainview to Silverton was cancelled from the designation. On January 7, 1948 the route assumed its current form as the designation was extended east from Memphis to the junction with US 83. The section added was formerly FM 30.

== Route description ==
The highway's western terminus is the intersection with SH 207 at Silverton in Briscoe County. SH 256 is known as Lone Star Street in Silverton. The highway is co-routed with SH 86 for a short distance as it runs east. The route then runs past Caprock Canyons State Park and turns toward the northeast, where it junctions with SH 70. After a brief co-routing with SH 70, the highway continues east through Lakeview to a junction with US 287 in Memphis. The highway is known as Noel Street in Memphis. The route then runs east to its final junction with US 83 in Childress County. Counties traversed by the highway include Briscoe, Hall and Childress. Most of the terrain covered by the highway is sparsely populated ranch country.

== Junction list ==
County	Location	mi	km	Destinations	Notes
Briscoe	Silverton			SH 86 / SH 207	Western terminus; West end of SH 86 overlap
Briscoe				FM 3365	
Briscoe		3.4	5.5	SH 86	East end of SH 86 overlap
Briscoe		22.9	36.9	SH 70	West end of SH 70 overlap
Hall		33.7	54.2	SH 70	East end of SH 70 overlap
Hall		42.7	68.7	FM 657	
Hall	Lakeview	45.0	72.4	FM 3517	
Hall		48.2	77.6	FM 2472	
Hall		53.7	86.4	FM 1041	
Hall	Memphis	54.3	87.4	FM 2361 (16th Street)	
Hall	Memphis	55.2	88.8	US 287 (Boykin Drive)	
Hall	Memphis	55.2	88.8	FM 1547 (3rd Street)	
Hall		59.9	96.4	FM 3032	
Childress		75.7	121.8	US 83	Eastern terminus
1.000 mi = 1.609 km; 1.000 km = 0.621 mi: Concurrency terminus
