= Plaska, Texas =

Incorporated place in Hall County, Texas

Coordinates: 34°36′21″N 100°38′48″W

Plaska is an incorporated place in Hall County, Texas, United States. The population was 20 in 2009.
