= Loco, Texas =

Unincorporated community in Texas, US

Coordinates: 34°43′03″N 100°09′09″W

Loco is an unincorporated community in Childress County, in the U.S. state of Texas.

== History ==
The first settlement at Loco was made in the 1880s. The community was named for locoweed found in the area.
