= National Motorists Association =

US-based advocacy organization

The National Motorists Association (NMA) is a nonprofit advocacy organization for motorists in North America, created in 1982. The association advocates for traffic safety based on its view of engineering standards, traffic laws fairly written and enforced, and full due process for motorists.

== History ==
The NMA, originally called the Citizens Coalition for Rational Traffic Laws (CCRTL), was founded as a 501(c)(3) in 1982 in opposition to the 55 mph National Maximum Speed Law, which was their chief cause until the law's repeal in 1995. The NMA continues to fight for the reform of drunk driving laws that can “target innocent motorists who happen to be social drinkers.” The organization's name was changed to the National Motorists Association in the late 1980s.

== Law Enforcement Reform ==
The NMA encourages all those receiving citations to challenge their traffic tickets as a means to keep the traffic justice system honest. The NMA opposes the installation of red light cameras, automated speed limit enforcement, and the use of stop-arm cameras on school buses. The NMA cites several studies on its site that include data showing significant increases in rear-end collisions at red-light-camera intersections.

The NMA operates a speedtrap registry and a roadblock registry where people can post the locations of traffic law enforcement and sobriety checkpoints.

The group opposes checkpoints, the use of Breathalyzers as evidence in court due to unreliability of results, the assumption of fault when a driver with a registerable BAC is in a collision, and most cases of license suspension due to DUI violations. The group supports lowering penalties for drunk drivers under a BAC of 0.15%. They oppose reducing the legal blood alcohol content limit and are against "zero tolerance" laws for drivers under the legal drinking age. The NMA states they support "drinking and driving regulations based on reasonable standards."

The organization also offers to reimburse traffic fines for paying members who are found guilty of speeding after unsuccessfully challenging a ticket.

== Organized protests ==
In the 1980s and '90s, the NMA would advertise a "Civil Obedience Day" where some drivers would travel in a caravan at the posted speed limit on a few local highways. The purpose was to illustrate instances where the posted speed limit was unreasonably low. The caravan would leave the far left lane open for cars to pass.

== Opposition to Vision Zero ==
NMA opposes some Vision Zero road safety projects. They have published editorials criticising certain policies which, in the organization's view, unreasonably restrict the ability to travel by personal automobiles and which it claims don't achieve intended safety goals.

== Corporate status and foundation ==
The National Motorists Association is a 501(c)(3) nonprofit corporation based in Waunakee, Wisconsin. NMA describes itself as a "grassroots advocacy organization". It does not publish membership statistics or funding sources.

== Previous usage ==
The National Motorists Association was also the name of an older automobile club in the United States, founded in 1922, which merged with the American Automobile Association in 1923.

== See also ==
- State motorcyclists' rights organizations (ABATE)
