= Hall County, Texas =

County in Texas, United States

- County
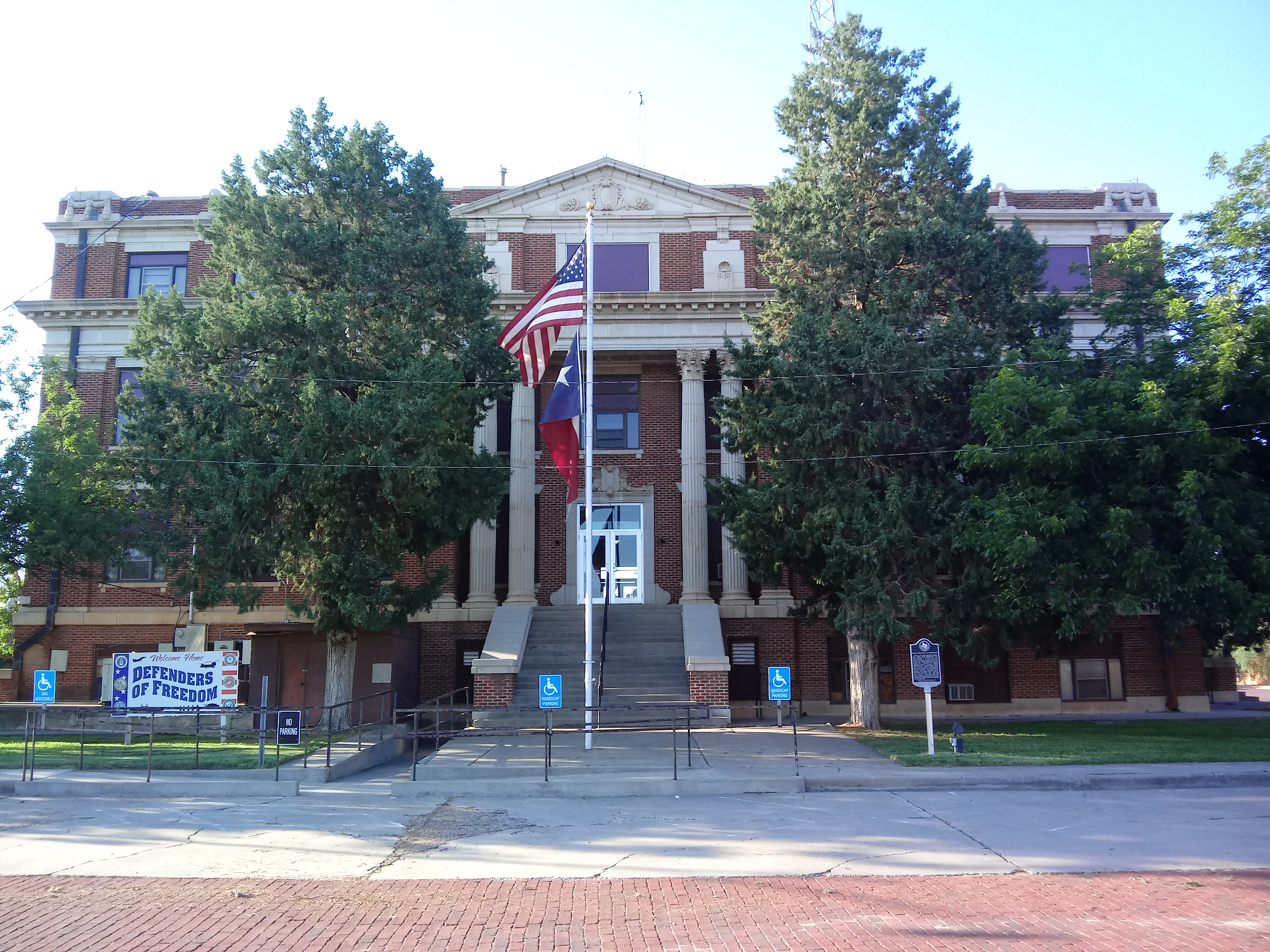
- The Hall County Courthouse in Memphis

- Location within the U.S. state of Texas
- Coordinates: 34°31′N 100°41′W
- Country: United States
- State: Texas
- Founded: 1890
- Named for: Warren D. C. Hall
- Seat: Memphis
- Largest city: Memphis

Area
  - Total: 904 sq mi (2,340 km^{2})
  - Land: 883 sq mi (2,290 km^{2})
  - Water: 21 sq mi (54 km^{2}) 2.3%

Population (2020)
  - Total: 2,825
  - Estimate (2025): 2,737 ▼
  - Density: 3.20/sq mi (1.24/km^{2})
- Time zone: UTC−6 (Central)
  - Summer (DST): UTC−5 (CDT)
- Congressional district: 13th
- Website: www.co.hall.tx.us

Hall County is a county located in the U.S. state of Texas. As of the 2020 census, the population is 2,825. Its county seat is Memphis. The county was created in 1876 and later organized in 1890. It is named for Warren D. C. Hall, a secretary of war for the Republic of Texas.

== Geography ==
According to the U.S. Census Bureau, the county has a total area of 904 square miles (2,340 km^{2}), of which 883 square miles (2,290 km^{2}) are land and 21 square miles (54 km^{2}) (3.8%) are covered by water.

=== Major highways ===
- U.S. Highway 287
- State Highway 70
- State Highway 86
- State Highway 256

=== Adjacent counties ===
- Donley County (north)
- Collingsworth County (northeast)
- Childress County (east)
- Cottle County (southeast)
- Motley County (south)
- Briscoe County (west)

== Demographics ==
Historical population
Census	Pop.	Note	%±
1880	36		—
1890	703		1,852.8%
1900	1,660		136.1%
1910	8,279		398.7%
1920	11,137		34.5%
1930	16,966		52.3%
1940	12,117		−28.6%
1950	10,930		−9.8%
1960	7,322		−33.0%
1970	6,015		−17.9%
1980	5,594		−7.0%
1990	3,905		−30.2%
2000	3,782		−3.1%
2010	3,353		−11.3%
2020	2,825		−15.7%
2025 (est.)	2,737	▼	−3.1%
U.S. Decennial Census; 1850–2010 2010 2020

=== Racial and ethnic composition ===
Hall County, Texas – Racial and ethnic composition Note: the US Census treats Hispanic/Latino as an ethnic category. This table excludes Latinos from the racial categories and assigns them to a separate category. Hispanics/Latinos may be of any race.
Race / Ethnicity (NH = Non-Hispanic)	Pop 2000	Pop 2010	Pop 2020	% 2000	% 2010	% 2020
White alone (NH)	2,397	1,998	1,589	63.38%	59.59%	56.25%
Black or African American alone (NH)	297	235	190	7.85%	7.01%	6.73%
Native American or Alaska Native alone (NH)	9	13	7	0.24%	0.39%	0.25%
Asian alone (NH)	5	2	9	0.13%	0.06%	0.32%
Pacific Islander alone (NH)	0	0	0	0.00%	0.00%	0.00%
Other Race alone (NH)	4	2	3	0.11%	0.06%	0.11%
Mixed Race or Multiracial (NH)	30	16	77	0.79%	0.48%	2.73%
Hispanic or Latino (any race)	1,040	1,087	950	27.50%	32.42%	33.63%
Total	3,782	3,353	2,825	100.00%	100.00%	100.00%

=== 2020 census ===
As of the 2020 census, the county had a population of 2,825. The median age was 47.2 years. 22.2% of residents were under the age of 18 and 24.9% of residents were 65 years of age or older. For every 100 females there were 97.7 males, and for every 100 females age 18 and over there were 94.8 males age 18 and over.

The racial makeup of the county was 67.1% White, 7.2% Black or African American, 0.5% American Indian and Alaska Native, 0.3% Asian, <0.1% Native Hawaiian and Pacific Islander, 13.2% from some other race, and 11.6% from two or more races. Hispanic or Latino residents of any race comprised 33.6% of the population.

<0.1% of residents lived in urban areas, while 100.0% lived in rural areas.

There were 1,220 households in the county, of which 26.3% had children under the age of 18 living in them. Of all households, 46.2% were married-couple households, 20.3% were households with a male householder and no spouse or partner present, and 28.7% were households with a female householder and no spouse or partner present. About 31.2% of all households were made up of individuals and 15.3% had someone living alone who was 65 years of age or older.

There were 1,744 housing units, of which 30.0% were vacant. Among occupied housing units, 73.9% were owner-occupied and 26.1% were renter-occupied. The homeowner vacancy rate was 3.6% and the rental vacancy rate was 15.4%.

=== 2000 census ===
As of the 2000 census, 3,782 people, 1,548 households, and 1,013 families resided in the county. The population density was 4 people per square mile (1.5 people/km^{2}). The 1,988 housing units averaged 2 units per square mile (0.77/km^{2}). The racial makeup of the county was 71.97% White, 8.22% Black or African American, 0.53% Native American, 0.16% Asian, 17.90% from other races, and 1.22% from two or more races. About 27.50% of the population was Hispanic or Latino of any race.

Of the 1,548 households, 28.20% had children under the age of 18 living with them, 53.70% were married couples living together, 9.00% had a female householder with no husband present, and 34.50% were not families; 32.40% of all households were made up of individuals, and 19.60% had someone living alone who was 65 years of age or older. The average household size was 2.42 and the average family size was 3.06.

In the county, the population was distributed as 27.20% under the age of 18, 6.80% from 18 to 24, 22.10% from 25 to 44, 22.40% from 45 to 64, and 21.50% who were 65 years of age or older. The median age was 40 years. For every 100 females, there were 91.70 males. For every 100 females age 18 and over, there were 86.50 males.

The median income for a household in the county was $23,016, and for a family was $27,325. Males had a median income of $22,167 versus $19,050 for females. The per capita income for the county was $13,210. About 21.60% of families and 26.30% of the population were below the poverty line, including 39.80% of those under age 18 and 16.30% of those age 65 or over.

== Education ==
Hall County is served by these districts (all are not entirely in Hall County)

- Memphis Independent School District
- Turkey-Quitaque Independent School District
- Childress Independent School District

Hall County is in the service area of Clarendon College.

== Communities ==
=== Cities ===
- Memphis (county seat)
- Turkey

=== Towns ===
- Estelline
- Lakeview

=== Other communities ===
- Brice
- Plaska

== Notable people ==
- William Mac Thornberry, U.S. Representative
- Daniel I.J. Thornton, governor of Colorado
- Blues Boy Willie, blues musician
- Bob Wills, musician

At one time, the JA Ranch, founded by Charles Goodnight and John George Adair, which reached into six counties, held acreage in Hall County. Minnie Lou Bradley, matriarch of the Bradley 3 Ranch in nearby Childress County, claims a Hall County address.

== Politics ==
Hall County is located within District 88 of the Texas House of Representatives. Hall County is located within District 31 of the Texas Senate.

United States presidential election results for Hall County, Texas
Year	Republican		Democratic		Third party(ies)	
Year	No.	%	No.	%	No.	%
1912	24	2.48%	773	79.77%	172	17.75%
1916	49	4.59%	925	86.61%	94	8.80%
1920	194	16.11%	922	76.58%	88	7.31%
1924	229	16.93%	1,060	78.34%	64	4.73%
1928	1,409	74.08%	493	25.92%	0	0.00%
1932	91	4.10%	2,114	95.31%	13	0.59%
1936	126	5.37%	2,195	93.56%	25	1.07%
1940	219	8.96%	2,221	90.84%	5	0.20%
1944	164	7.78%	1,812	85.96%	132	6.26%
1948	174	7.32%	2,122	89.31%	80	3.37%
1952	1,253	41.78%	1,744	58.15%	2	0.07%
1956	687	31.53%	1,487	68.24%	5	0.23%
1960	939	44.02%	1,192	55.88%	2	0.09%
1964	667	27.19%	1,785	72.77%	1	0.04%
1968	753	33.84%	1,038	46.65%	434	19.51%
1972	1,303	67.37%	607	31.39%	24	1.24%
1976	671	29.00%	1,633	70.57%	10	0.43%
1980	1,141	51.40%	1,057	47.61%	22	0.99%
1984	1,058	51.74%	984	48.12%	3	0.15%
1988	714	40.96%	1,029	59.04%	0	0.00%
1992	631	36.81%	819	47.78%	264	15.40%
1996	626	42.53%	750	50.95%	96	6.52%
2000	966	66.80%	472	32.64%	8	0.55%
2004	860	67.35%	413	32.34%	4	0.31%
2008	930	73.58%	324	25.63%	10	0.79%
2012	832	75.02%	265	23.90%	12	1.08%
2016	893	81.85%	164	15.03%	34	3.12%
2020	995	85.12%	168	14.37%	6	0.51%
2024	992	86.34%	149	12.97%	8	0.70%

United States Senate election results for Hall County, Texas1
Year	Republican		Democratic		Third party(ies)	
Year	No.	%	No.	%	No.	%
2024	957	84.62%	155	13.70%	19	1.68%

United States Senate election results for Hall County, Texas2
Year	Republican		Democratic		Third party(ies)	
Year	No.	%	No.	%	No.	%
2020	967	84.82%	156	13.68%	17	1.49%

Texas Gubernatorial election results for Hall County
Year	Republican		Democratic		Third party(ies)	
Year	No.	%	No.	%	No.	%
2022	772	88.03%	94	10.72%	11	1.25%

== See also ==
- List of museums in the Texas Panhandle
- National Register of Historic Places listings in Hall County, Texas
- Recorded Texas Historic Landmarks in Hall County
