= Blues Boy Willie =

American singer (1946–2024)

- Born: William Daniel McFall; November 28, 1946; Memphis, Texas, U.S.
- Died: March 2, 2024 (aged 77) Amarillo, Texas, U.S.
- Genres: Electric blues, soul blues
- Occupations: Singer, musician, songwriter
- Instruments: Vocals, guitar, double bass, harmonica
- Years active: 1960s–2024
- Labels: Ichiban Records and others

William Daniel McFall (November 28, 1946 – March 2, 2024), known professionally as Blues Boy Willie, was an American electric and soul blues singer, musician, and songwriter. Influenced jointly by his grounding in gospel and Junior Parker's recordings, Blues Boy Willie's songwriting has produced gritty songs, including "Be Who?", "Injustice", and "The Fly".

McFall released ten albums and a string of singles in a long career, including work which appeared in the US Billboard R&B albums chart. Steve Leggett of AllMusic stated that Blues Boy Willie "makes things work by the sheer force of his engaging personality."

== Life and career ==
William Daniel McFall (Note: Many sources spell his surname as McFalls, but the cited reference given above to McFall is supported by his official Texas birth record.) was born in Memphis, Texas, on November 28, 1946. His father, James "Tim" McFall was, reportedly, a musician in a tent show band that once accompanied Ma Rainey. His mother was Thelma McFall. Willie first appeared on stage, at the age of five, playing drums in one of his elder brother's band. By the age of eight he had heard and became enchanted with blues music. He graduated from Memphis High School, and then studied music at Clarendon College in Clarendon, Texas. He learned to play the double bass there, and then toured the college circuit playing the guitar. Blues Boy Willie later relocated to Los Angeles, California. He spent the next ten years touring and performing along Coastal California as part of a blues trio.

Continually trying to make a living from music, by playing his now local Texas patch of the chitlin' circuit for years, Blues Boy Willie was thrown a lifeline in 1989, when his childhood friend, Gary B.B. Coleman, invited him to join the roster at Ichiban Records. Willie's debut album, Strange Things Happening, was recorded and released the same year. His baritone voice, was augmented by a soul blues backdrop enriched by touches of humor. He introduced the character, 'Leroy', a hapless individual who re-appeared in later songs, and the songs "The Fly" and "Fishing Trip", the latter introducing a series of metaphors for infidelity. The album was produced by Coleman, who also provided guitar work. Koko Taylor recorded "Fishing Trip" on her 1990 album, Jump for Joy. His sophomore effort, Be Who? (1990), contained Blues Boy Willie's most played track, "Be Who?", containing comedy laden dialogue between Willie, his then wife 'Miss Lee', and his producer/friend Coleman, with the crux of it being Willie's suggestion that some of his children are not his. The popularity of the track helped propel the album to spend 21 weeks on the US Billboard R&B albums chart, peaking at No. 57. This modest success gave Blues Boy Willie a nationwide profile, and continued the series of novelty numbers, that long earned him exposure in the Southern soul blues arena.

His next release came in 1991 with Be Who? 2. The songs, mostly written by Blues Boy Willie and Coleman, included another instalment of the "Be Who?" saga, with Willie still protesting that another is "dipping in my sugar bowl". The album peaked at No. 98 on the Billboard R&B chart. It was followed the next year by I Got The Blues, with largely formulaic fare, and a record sleeve that oddly depicted Blues Boy Willie holding a guitar which he did not play throughout the album. Ichiban issued Don't Look Down in 1993. He wrote five tracks such as "Funny Stuff", and other songs which also had his version of Brook Benton's, "So Close". The album was produced by Jimmy O'Neill. His finale on Ichiban was Juke Joint Blues, again produced by O'Neill, which incorporated another comedic cut, "Marry Myself". Willie opined that he might marry himself as he "can do the same thing a little girl can do... well, almost the same thing." Through his connection with Coleman, Blues Boy Willie had met Johnny Rawls, and they jointly started the 'Blues Review' touring company, which concentrated their efforts in the Southern United States. Veteran musicians including Rufus Thomas, Tyrone Davis, and Johnnie Taylor, all performed in the touring ensemble in the late 1990s In 2002, American Roots: Blues, was a 14-song collection of the best cuts from his six Ichiban albums. Highlights included "Leroy" and "Where Is Leroy," two installments in the ongoing saga.

Back Again was Blues Boy Willie's first studio album in seven years, it was released on his record producer Johnny Rawls own label, Deep South Sound. Willie played the harmonica on the final track "Blues Boy". With his years of recording and performing live, Blues Boy Willie had by now built a solid following. In 2008, Blues Boy Willie was featured as part of Bob Phillips' television anthology series, Texas Country Reporter. His once prolific recording schedule had slowed down and his next two offerings, Can't Deny The Blues (2013) and Back Porch Blues (2020), were both digital-only releases.

In January 2019, in his long-time home base of Amarillo, Texas, the Texas Blues Rangers organized a fundraiser to assist Blues Boy Willie to effect vital repairs to his house. Around 40 musicians from the Texas Panhandle helped raise funds, with Willie playing the harmonica on stage for the first time in years.

Blues Boy Willie died from complications of a stroke at Northwest Texas Hospital in Amarillo, Texas, on March 2, 2024. He was 77.

== Discography ==
=== Albums ===
Year	Title	Record label(s)
1989	Strange Things Happening	Ichiban Records
1990	Be Who?	Ichiban Records
1991	Be Who? 2	Ichiban Records
1992	I Got the Blues	Ichiban Records
1993	Don't Look Down	Ichiban Records
1995	Juke Joint Blues	Ichiban Records
2002	American Roots: Blues ≠	Ichiban Records
2002	Back Again	Deep South Sound
2013	Can't Deny the Blues §	Jekke Music
2020	Back Porch Blues §	BBW

≠ - Compilation album
§ - Digital only release

=== Singles ===
Year	Title	Record label(s)
1989	"Let's Go, Let's Go, Let's Go"	Ichiban Records
1990	"Why Are You Cheatin' on Me"	Ichiban Records
1990	"Be-Who"	Ichiban Records
1991	"Be Who - Two"	Ichiban Records
1992	"Be Who - 3"	Ichiban Records
1993	"Better Not Look Down"	Ichiban Records

== See also ==
- List of electric blues musicians
- List of soul-blues musicians
