= Warren D. C. Hall =

American politician (1794–1867)

Warren DeWitt Clinton Hall (1794–1867), also called D.C. Hall, was an American and Texan lawyer, pioneer, and soldier. He was active in the Texas Revolution and acted as Secretary of War for the Republic of Texas in 1836. His brother was George Braxton Hall, part of the original 300 settlers in Texas. He was a Mason in Louisiana, and in the Republic of Texas, a Masonic symbol is on his gravestone. He was an active Masonic supporter.

Hall spent his later years at his plantation, known as Three Trees, in southwestern Brazoria County, Texas, and died there on April 8, 1867. He is buried in the Trinity Episcopal Cemetery at Galveston. Hall County, Texas, was named in his honor.
