= Childress County, Texas =

County in Texas, United States

- County
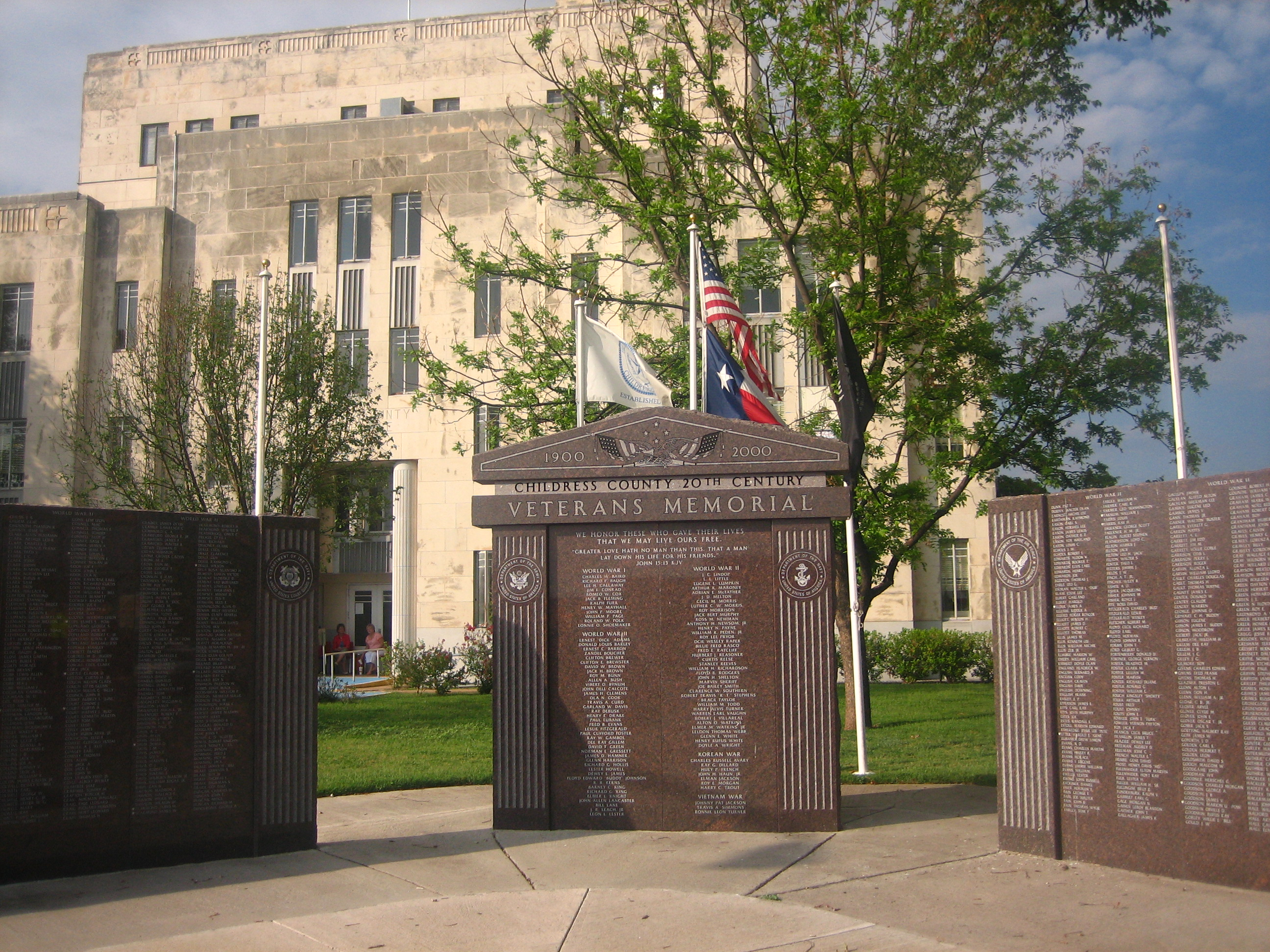
- Veterans Memorial at the Childress County Courthouse in Childress

- Location within the U.S. state of Texas
- Coordinates: 34°32′N 100°12′W
- Country: United States
- State: Texas
- Founded: 1887
- Named for: George Campbell Childress
- Seat: Childress
- Largest city: Childress

Area
  - Total: 714 sq mi (1,850 km^{2})
  - Land: 696 sq mi (1,800 km^{2})
  - Water: 17 sq mi (44 km^{2}) 2.4%

Population (2020)
  - Total: 6,664
  - Estimate (2025): 6,643 ▼
  - Density: 9.57/sq mi (3.70/km^{2})
- Time zone: UTC−6 (Central)
  - Summer (DST): UTC−5 (CDT)
- Congressional district: 13th
- Website: www.childresstx.us

Childress County (/ˈtʃɪldrɪs/ CHIL-driss) is a county located in the U.S. state of Texas. As of the 2020 census, its population was 6,664. The county seat is Childress. The county was created in 1876 and later organized in 1887. It is named for George Campbell Childress, the author of the Texas Declaration of Independence.

County and regional history is preserved in the Childress County Heritage Museum in downtown Childress. The Bradley 3 Ranch, operated by matriarch Minnie Lou Bradley, is entirely in Childress County, but has a Memphis (Hall County) mailing address.

== Geography ==
According to the U.S. Census Bureau, the county has a total area of 714 square miles (1,850 km^{2}), of which 696 square miles (1,800 km^{2}) are land and 17 square miles (44 km^{2}) (2.4%) are covered by water.

=== Major highways ===
- U.S. Highway 62
- U.S. Highway 83
- U.S. Highway 287
- State Highway 256
- Loop 328
- Spur 184

=== Adjacent counties ===
- Collingsworth County (north)
- Harmon County, Oklahoma (northeast)
- Hardeman County (east)
- Cottle County (south)
- Hall County (west)

== Demographics ==
Historical population
Census	Pop.	Note	%±
1880	25		—
1890	1,175		4,600.0%
1900	2,138		82.0%
1910	9,538		346.1%
1920	10,933		14.6%
1930	16,044		46.7%
1940	12,149		−24.3%
1950	12,123		−0.2%
1960	8,421		−30.5%
1970	6,605		−21.6%
1980	6,950		5.2%
1990	5,953		−14.3%
2000	7,688		29.1%
2010	7,041		−8.4%
2020	6,664		−5.4%
2025 (est.)	6,643	▼	−0.3%
U.S. Decennial Census; 1850–2010 2010 2020

=== Racial and ethnic composition ===
Childress County, Texas – Racial and ethnic composition Note: the US Census treats Hispanic/Latino as an ethnic category. This table excludes Latinos from the racial categories and assigns them to a separate category. Hispanics/Latinos may be of any race.
Race / Ethnicity (NH = Non-Hispanic)	Pop 2000	Pop 2010	Pop 2020	% 2000	% 2010	% 2020
White alone (NH)	4,923	4,327	3,852	64.03%	61.45%	57.80%
Black or African American alone (NH)	1,074	684	572	13.97%	9.71%	8.58%
Native American or Alaska Native alone (NH)	23	28	20	0.30%	0.40%	0.30%
Asian alone (NH)	23	47	51	0.30%	0.67%	0.77%
Pacific Islander alone (NH)	2	2	2	0.03%	0.03%	0.03%
Other race alone (NH)	1	9	16	0.01%	0.0%	0.24%
Mixed race or Multiracial (NH)	68	59	209	0.88%	0.84%	3.14%
Hispanic or Latino (any race)	1,574	1,885	1,942	20.47%	26.77%	29.14%
Total	7,688	7,041	6,664	100.00%	100.00%	100.00%

=== 2020 census ===
As of the 2020 census, the county had a population of 6,664. The median age was 35.4 years. 20.2% of residents were under the age of 18 and 16.5% of residents were 65 years of age or older. For every 100 females there were 136.3 males, and for every 100 females age 18 and over there were 144.6 males age 18 and over.

The racial makeup of the county was 66.4% White, 8.7% Black or African American, 0.4% American Indian and Alaska Native, 0.8% Asian, <0.1% Native Hawaiian and Pacific Islander, 14.4% from some other race, and 9.2% from two or more races. Hispanic or Latino residents of any race comprised 29.1% of the population.

67.8% of residents lived in urban areas, while 32.2% lived in rural areas.

There were 2,282 households in the county, of which 30.6% had children under the age of 18 living in them. Of all households, 46.5% were married-couple households, 18.7% were households with a male householder and no spouse or partner present, and 29.1% were households with a female householder and no spouse or partner present. About 29.7% of all households were made up of individuals and 15.8% had someone living alone who was 65 years of age or older.

There were 2,824 housing units, of which 19.2% were vacant. Among occupied housing units, 68.9% were owner-occupied and 31.1% were renter-occupied. The homeowner vacancy rate was 2.9% and the rental vacancy rate was 16.7%.

=== 2000 census ===
As of the 2000 census, 7,688 people, 2,474 households, and 1,650 families resided in the county. The population density was 11 people per square mile (4.2 people/km^{2}). The 3,059 housing units averaged 4 units per square mile (1.5/km^{2}). The racial makeup of the county was 67.70% White, 14.09% Black or African American, 0.33% Native American, 0.30% Asian, 0.05% Pacific Islander, 15.70% from other races, and 1.83% from two or more races. About 20.47% of the population was Hispanic or Latino of any race.

Of the 2,474 households, 31.30% had children under the age of 18 living with them, 52.40% were married couples living together, 11.40% had a female householder with no husband present, and 33.30% were not families. About 30.80% of all households were made up of individuals, and 16.50% had someone living alone who was 65 years of age or older. The average household size was 2.40 and the average family size was 3.00.

In the county, the population was distributed as 22.10% under the age of 18, 12.10% from 18 to 24, 30.60% from 25 to 44, 19.40% from 45 to 64, and 15.80% who were 65 years of age or older. The median age was 37 years. For every 100 females, there were 142.40 males. For every 100 females age 18 and over, there were 149.50 males.

The median income for a household in the county was $27,457, and for a family was $35,543. Males had a median income of $25,606 versus $20,037 for females. The per capita income for the county was $12,452. About 13.70% of families and 17.60% of the population were below the poverty line, including 28.30% of those under age 18 and 10.30% of those age 65 or over.

== Communities ==
=== City ===
- Childress (county seat)

=== Unincorporated communities ===
- Carey
- Kirkland
- Loco
- Tell

== Politics ==
Formerly a Democratic stronghold like the rest of Texas, Childress County has, since the Reagan era, become powerfully Republican, since the 2000s.

Childress County is located within District 88 of the Texas House of Representatives. Childress County is located within District 28 of the Texas Senate.

United States presidential election results for Childress County, Texas
Year	Republican		Democratic		Third party(ies)	
Year	No.	%	No.	%	No.	%
1912	34	4.24%	721	89.90%	47	5.86%
1916	31	2.93%	948	89.52%	80	7.55%
1920	158	11.00%	1,206	83.98%	72	5.01%
1924	178	13.03%	1,117	81.77%	71	5.20%
1928	1,438	66.45%	726	33.55%	0	0.00%
1932	153	6.84%	2,072	92.58%	13	0.58%
1936	209	9.06%	2,076	89.99%	22	0.95%
1940	335	10.92%	2,729	88.98%	3	0.10%
1944	299	10.69%	2,295	82.05%	203	7.26%
1948	273	9.75%	2,415	86.22%	113	4.03%
1952	1,890	50.12%	1,879	49.83%	2	0.05%
1956	1,268	45.61%	1,503	54.06%	9	0.32%
1960	1,571	56.78%	1,189	42.97%	7	0.25%
1964	952	32.48%	1,977	67.45%	2	0.07%
1968	1,045	37.88%	1,093	39.62%	621	22.51%
1972	1,716	69.81%	729	29.66%	13	0.53%
1976	1,043	39.72%	1,578	60.09%	5	0.19%
1980	1,443	53.19%	1,222	45.04%	48	1.77%
1984	1,574	63.44%	900	36.28%	7	0.28%
1988	1,201	52.98%	1,060	46.76%	6	0.26%
1992	1,033	44.18%	881	37.68%	424	18.14%
1996	1,072	54.64%	719	36.65%	171	8.72%
2000	1,506	70.84%	602	28.32%	18	0.85%
2004	1,629	75.98%	511	23.83%	4	0.19%
2008	1,782	77.61%	497	21.65%	17	0.74%
2012	1,665	83.42%	320	16.03%	11	0.55%
2016	1,802	86.47%	253	12.14%	29	1.39%
2020	1,943	85.11%	310	13.58%	30	1.31%
2024	1,991	87.63%	263	11.58%	18	0.79%

United States Senate election results for Childress County, Texas1
Year	Republican		Democratic		Third party(ies)	
Year	No.	%	No.	%	No.	%
2024	1,919	85.52%	285	12.70%	40	1.78%

United States Senate election results for Childress County, Texas2
Year	Republican		Democratic		Third party(ies)	
Year	No.	%	No.	%	No.	%
2020	1,936	85.70%	283	12.53%	40	1.77%

Texas Gubernatorial election results for Childress County
Year	Republican		Democratic		Third party(ies)	
Year	No.	%	No.	%	No.	%
2022	1,562	89.21%	162	9.25%	27	1.54%

== See also ==
- List of museums in the Texas Panhandle
- National Register of Historic Places listings in Childress County, Texas
- Recorded Texas Historic Landmarks in Childress County
