= Memphis, Texas =

- City
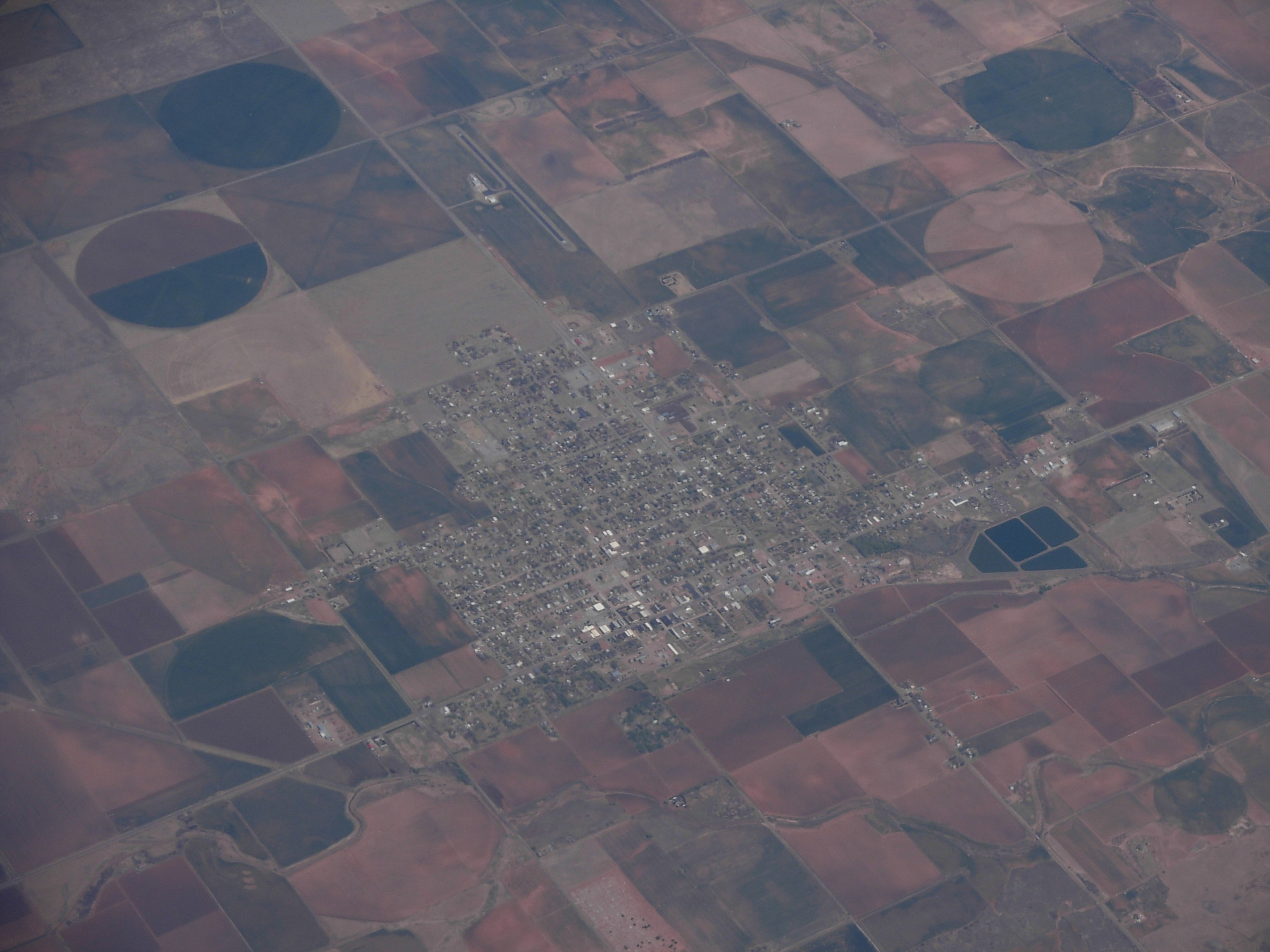
- Aerial view of Memphis

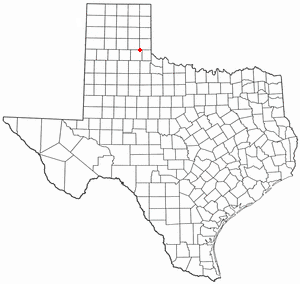
- Location of Memphis, Texas

- Location in Hall County, Texas
- Coordinates: 34°43′36″N 100°32′30″W
- Country: United States
- State: Texas
- County: Hall
- Settled: 1889
- Incorporated: 1906

Government
  - Type: Council–Manager
  - Town Council: Mayor

Area
  - Total: 2.24 sq mi (5.81 km^{2})
  - Land: 2.24 sq mi (5.81 km^{2})
  - Water: 0 sq mi (0.00 km^{2})
- Elevation: 2,074 ft (632 m)

Population (2020)
  - Total: 2,048
  - Density: 913/sq mi (352/km^{2})
- Time zone: UTC-6 (Central (CST))
  - Summer (DST): UTC-5 (CDT)
- ZIP code: 79245
- Area code: 806
- FIPS code: 48-47616
- GNIS feature ID: 2411074
- Website: memphistexas.gov

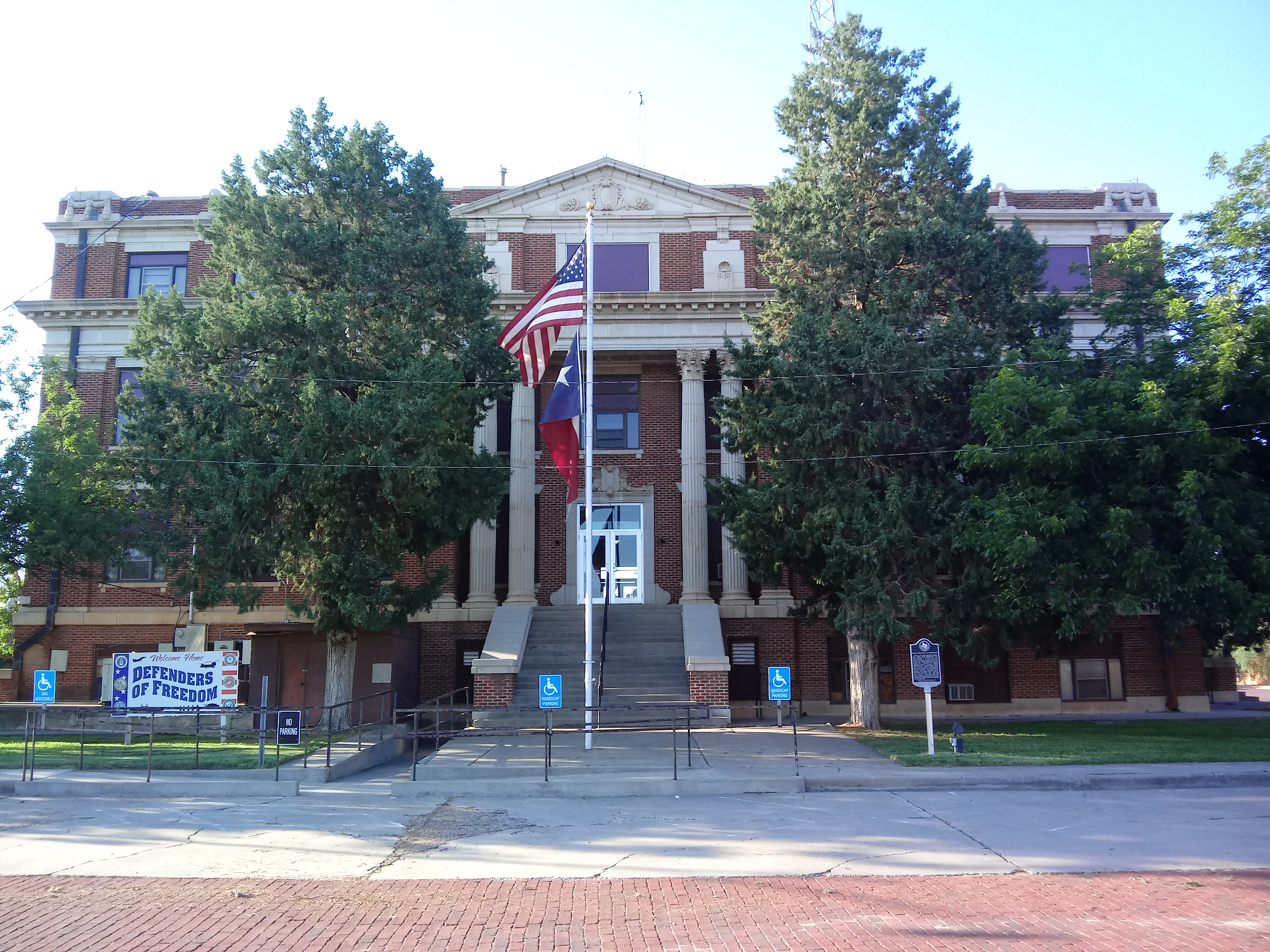
Hall County Courthouse (Texas)

Memphis is a city in and the county seat of Hall County, Texas, United States. As of the 2020 census, Memphis had a population of 2,048.

== History ==
Memphis, Texas, the county seat of Hall County, is at the junction of U.S. Highway 287, State Highway 256, and Farm to Market Road 1547, in the northeastern part of the county. It started in 1889, when J. C. Montgomery purchased land for a townsite north of Salisbury on the Fort Worth and Denver City Railway. This land had been previously owned by W. H. Robertson, who had a dugout near Parker Creek. Montgomery and Robertson, with Rev. J. W. Brice and T. J. Woods, Jr., of Dallas, formed a townsite company and presented a plat early in January 1890. P. M. Kelly opened a law office. A rooming house (later the Memphis Hotel), a general store, a drugstore, and several residences were soon erected. For a time, the new town was without a name. Several suggestions were submitted to federal postal authorities, but with negative results. Finally, as the story goes, Reverend Brice, while in Austin, happened to see a letter addressed by accident to Memphis, Texas, rather than Tennessee, with the notation "no such town in Texas". The name was submitted and accepted, and a post office was established on September 12, 1890, with Robertson as postmaster.

In the meantime, Hall County was being organized. Memphis was engaged in a heated county seat battle with neighboring Salisbury and Lakeview. Memphis won the election with a total of 84 votes. County officers were elected in June, and a school district was subsequently formed. Since Memphis was without a depot and trains did not stop there, certain citizens sought to remedy that situation by smearing the tracks with lye soap. A subsequent agreement was struck between town promoters and railroad officials. In 1891, a depot was built, and businesses were moved on wheels from Salisbury to the new county seat, where a courthouse of homemade bricks was constructed in 1892.

Memphis thus enjoyed a boom period. Two saloons, a bank, numerous stores, blacksmith shops, and livery stables attested to its role as a shipping and trading center for area ranchers and farmers. The Missionary Baptist Church was organized in Memphis; its minister Rev. J. L. Pyle began Baptist congregations throughout the county. Telephone service was first installed in 1901. In June 1906, the town was incorporated with a mayor-council form of city government. The Memphis Cotton Oil Mill was established in 1907. Memphis had at one time or another several newspapers, including the Hall County Record (1889–1893), the Hall County Herald (1890–1928), the Memphis Journal (1892–1894), the Memphis Times (1896), the Memphis Leader (1897–1899), the Hall County News (1897–1903), and the Memphis News (1928–1929). The only newspaper extant in 1986, the Memphis Democrat, was launched in 1908 and went through a succession of owners. By the 1920s, Memphis had a new brick-and-stone courthouse, modern utilities, a cotton compress, three hotels, brick school buildings, and a Carnegie Library. In 1922, the city's Morning Side addition was founded east of the tracks as a residential area for blacks who labored in the cotton fields and mills. In 1935, E. M. Ewen and his wife formed the Hall County Old Settlers' Reunion (later the Hall County Picnic Association). Four years later, they staged a rodeo as part of the annual two-day celebration.

Since the Great Depression era, Memphis has continued as a farm supply center. In 1986, the city had a cotton compress, gins, a grain elevator, two banks, eight churches, four public schools, a modern medical complex, two motels, several mercantile stores (including three wholesale houses), and a municipal airport northeast of town. In addition, Memphis is noted for its tree-lined streets, city park, one swimming pool, community center, and 50 blocks of brick paving laid in 1926. Brookhollow Country Club Lake, a private fishing lake with cabin sites, is six miles northeast of the city. Heritage Hall, which occupies the old First National Bank building on the square, contains local history displays and natural science exhibits. The population was 3,332 in 1960 and 3,352 in 1980. Memphis reported 81 businesses in 1984. United States Congressman Jack Hightower comes from Memphis. The route of the annual Cotton Boll Enduro, a 125-mile cross-country motorcycle event held in late October, begins and ends at Memphis. In 1990 Memphis had a population of 2,465. The population was 2,479 in 2000 and 2,290 in 2010.

The county was named after Warren D.C. Hall, who served as Secretary of War while Texas was a republic. He was a lawyer from North Carolina before coming to Texas.

A timeline of significant events in Memphis' history: 1889: Land was bought along the Fort Worth and Denver City Railway 1890: Townsite platted, yet names were rejected by postal authorities until September of that year
1891: Memphis wins contested election for county seat against towns of Salisbury and Lakeview
1891: Depot built after Memphians kept putting soap on rails to stop trains
1892: Courthouse constructed
1901: Memphis gets telephone service
1906: Town is incorporated
1912: Memphis gets its own Carnegie Library
1923: New courthouse built
1926: 50 blocks of streets are paved with brick

=== 2013 Civil rights case ===
In September 2013, a federal suit was filed by Laura Dutton, alleging that the cities of Estelline and Memphis, former Officer Jayson Fry and Memphis Police Chief Chris Jolly violated her Fourth Amendment rights against illegal search and seizure when she was arrested November 28, 2012, in Estelline on a felony money-laundering charge, seizing more than $29,000 from her pickup and illegally keeping $1,400 of her cash. The city of Estelline maintained no written records of past searches or seizures, yet traffic fines and forfeitures made up more than 89% of its gross revenues in fiscal year 2012. The cities and the officers denied her claims, but in July 2014, the city of Estelline and Hall County authorities settled with Dutton for $77,500.

== Geography ==
According to the United States Census Bureau, the city has a total area of 2.2 square miles (5.7 km^{2}), all land.

Hall County Seat, Texas Panhandle
Hwy 287 and State Hwy 256,
28 miles SE of Clarendon
64 miles SE of Amarillo
29 miles NE of Childress
14 miles NE of Estelline,
Population: 2,290 (2010)

== Climate ==
The Köppen climate classification subtype for Memphis, Texas, is BSk, semiarid climate, on climate maps.

Climate data for Memphis, Texas (1991–2020 normals, extremes 1905–present)
| Month | Jan | Feb | Mar | Apr | May | Jun | Jul | Aug | Sep | Oct | Nov | Dec | Year |
|---|---|---|---|---|---|---|---|---|---|---|---|---|---|
| Record high °F (°C) | 88 (31) | 93 (34) | 99 (37) | 105 (41) | 109 (43) | 116 (47) | 115 (46) | 117 (47) | 110 (43) | 106 (41) | 92 (33) | 88 (31) | 117 (47) |
| Mean maximum °F (°C) | 76.8 (24.9) | 80.8 (27.1) | 89.2 (31.8) | 94.3 (34.6) | 99.8 (37.7) | 103.8 (39.9) | 106.0 (41.1) | 104.5 (40.3) | 100.1 (37.8) | 93.8 (34.3) | 83.7 (28.7) | 76.2 (24.6) | 108.0 (42.2) |
| Mean daily maximum °F (°C) | 53.3 (11.8) | 57.0 (13.9) | 66.5 (19.2) | 75.2 (24.0) | 83.2 (28.4) | 91.9 (33.3) | 96.2 (35.7) | 94.8 (34.9) | 86.6 (30.3) | 75.4 (24.1) | 63.7 (17.6) | 53.9 (12.2) | 74.8 (23.8) |
| Daily mean °F (°C) | 39.3 (4.1) | 42.8 (6.0) | 51.6 (10.9) | 60.4 (15.8) | 69.6 (20.9) | 78.7 (25.9) | 82.9 (28.3) | 81.4 (27.4) | 73.4 (23.0) | 61.4 (16.3) | 49.4 (9.7) | 40.5 (4.7) | 60.9 (16.1) |
| Mean daily minimum °F (°C) | 25.4 (−3.7) | 28.7 (−1.8) | 36.8 (2.7) | 45.6 (7.6) | 56.0 (13.3) | 65.5 (18.6) | 69.5 (20.8) | 68.0 (20.0) | 60.2 (15.7) | 47.4 (8.6) | 35.2 (1.8) | 27.0 (−2.8) | 47.1 (8.4) |
| Mean minimum °F (°C) | 12.9 (−10.6) | 16.2 (−8.8) | 22.1 (−5.5) | 32.1 (0.1) | 42.8 (6.0) | 57.1 (13.9) | 63.0 (17.2) | 61.3 (16.3) | 47.9 (8.8) | 32.5 (0.3) | 20.4 (−6.4) | 14.0 (−10.0) | 8.8 (−12.9) |
| Record low °F (°C) | −11 (−24) | −4 (−20) | 4 (−16) | 21 (−6) | 32 (0) | 39 (4) | 50 (10) | 49 (9) | 34 (1) | 18 (−8) | 10 (−12) | −6 (−21) | −11 (−24) |
| Average precipitation inches (mm) | 0.78 (20) | 0.84 (21) | 1.38 (35) | 2.00 (51) | 3.49 (89) | 2.92 (74) | 2.35 (60) | 2.46 (62) | 2.44 (62) | 1.78 (45) | 1.01 (26) | 0.83 (21) | 22.28 (566) |
| Average precipitation days (≥ 0.01 in) | 2.5 | 3.1 | 3.8 | 4.6 | 6.6 | 6.0 | 4.4 | 5.2 | 4.4 | 4.5 | 2.9 | 2.4 | 50.4 |
Source: NOAA

== Demographics ==
Historical population
| Census | Pop. | Note | %± |
|---|---|---|---|
| 1910 | 1,936 | | — |
| 1920 | 2,839 | | 46.6% |
| 1930 | 4,257 | | 49.9% |
| 1940 | 3,869 | | −9.1% |
| 1950 | 3,810 | | −1.5% |
| 1960 | 3,332 | | −12.5% |
| 1970 | 3,227 | | −3.2% |
| 1980 | 3,352 | | 3.9% |
| 1990 | 2,465 | | −26.5% |
| 2000 | 2,479 | | 0.6% |
| 2010 | 2,290 | | −7.6% |
| 2020 | 2,048 | | −10.6% |
U.S. Decennial Census; Texas Almanac: 1850-2010

=== 2020 census ===
As of the 2020 United States census, Memphis had a population of 2,048 people living in 891 households, 628 of which were families. The median age was 45.4 years, with 23.4% of residents under the age of 18 and 23.8% aged 65 years or older. For every 100 females there were 93.8 males, and for every 100 females age 18 and over there were 89.3 males age 18 and over.

0.0% of residents lived in urban areas, while 100.0% lived in rural areas.

Of the 891 households in Memphis, 27.0% had children under the age of 18 living in them; 44.3% were married-couple households, 19.3% were households with a male householder and no spouse or partner present, and 31.2% were households with a female householder and no spouse or partner present. About 32.1% of all households were made up of individuals and 15.2% had someone living alone who was 65 years of age or older.

There were 1,122 housing units, of which 20.6% were vacant. The homeowner vacancy rate was 1.8% and the rental vacancy rate was 15.3%.

Racial composition as of the 2020 census
| Race | Number | Percent |
|---|---|---|
| White | 1,301 | 63.5% |
| Black or African American | 172 | 8.4% |
| American Indian and Alaska Native | 8 | 0.4% |
| Asian | 7 | 0.3% |
| Native Hawaiian and Other Pacific Islander | 0 | 0.0% |
| Some other race | 295 | 14.4% |
| Two or more races | 265 | 12.9% |
| Hispanic or Latino (of any race) | 762 | 37.2% |

=== 2000 census ===
As of the census of 2000, 2,479 people, 1,024 households, and 660 families resided in the city. The population density was 1,105.2 inhabitants per square mile (426.7/km^{2}). The 1,245 housing units averaged 555.1/sq mi (214.6/km^{2}). The racial makeup of the city was 71.40% White, 9.08% African American, 0.56% Native American, 0.04% Asian, 17.63% from other races, and 1.29% from two or more races. Hispanics or Latinos of any race were 26.02% of the population.

Of the 1,024 households, 28.6% had children under the age of 18 living with them, 51.6% were married couples living together, 10.1% had a female householder with no husband present, and 35.5% were not families. About 33.7% of all households were made up of individuals, and 21.0% had someone living alone who was 65 years of age or older. The average household size was 2.38 and the average family size was 3.03.

In the city, the population was distributed as 27.1% under the age of 18, 7.1% from 18 to 24, 22.1% from 25 to 44, 22.2% from 45 to 64, and 21.4% who were 65 years of age or older. The median age was 40 years. For every 100 females, there were 86.4 males. For every 100 females age 18 and over, there were 81.5 males.

The median income for a household in the city was $23,102, and for a family was $27,367. Males had a median income of $24,620 versus $18,816 for females. The per capita income for the city was $13,856. About 18.5% of families and 23.9% of the population were below the poverty line, including 38.2% of those under age 18 and 15.4% of those age 65 or over.

== Government ==
William McClellan "Mac" Thornberry is the U.S. representative from the Texas Panhandle. He has served since 1995, when the House seated its first Republican majority in 40 years.

Thornberry represents Texas's 13th congressional district, a Republican stronghold which stretches between the Oklahoma and New Mexico borders. It winds across the Panhandle into the South Plains, then runs east across the Red River Valley. Covering over 40,000 square miles (100,000 km^{2}), it is the second-largest district geographically in Texas and one of the largest (excluding at-large districts in Wyoming, Montana, and Alaska) in the country. It is larger in area than 13 states. The principal cities in the district are Amarillo and Wichita Falls.

Kelton Gray Seliger is a Republican member of the Texas State Senate representing District 31, which stretches from the Panhandle to the Permian Basin.

Republican Drew Springer, Jr., a businessman from Muenster in Cooke County, has since January 2013 represented Memphis in the Texas House of Representatives.

== Education ==
Memphis is served by the Memphis Independent School District.

Clarendon College – Childress Center is located about 29 miles southeast in Childress, Texas. Clarendon College is a community college located around 28 miles northeast in Clarendon, the seat of Donley County in the Texas Panhandle. The college operates branch campuses in Pampa and Childress.

As defined by the Texas Legislature, Hall County is in the service area of Clarendon College.

== Media ==
=== Radio ===
- KCTX-AM
- KCTX-FM
- KLSR-FM

=== Newspaper ===
- The Hall County Herald

Owner: Blackburn Media Group Inc
Founded: 1890, (previously known as the Memphis Democrat)
Shari Watson is the editor of the Hall County Herald
Mailing address: 617 W. Main, Memphis, TX 79245–3703

- The Red River Sun

Owner: Blackburn Media Group Inc
Founded: July, 2014, (previously the Childress Index)
Ginger Wilson is the editor of the Red River Sun
Mailing address: PO Box 1260, Childress, TX 79201

- Clarendon Enterprise

Owner: Roger A. Estlack
Founded: 1878, (as the Clarendon News)
Roger A. Estlack is the editor of the Clarendon Enterprise
Mailing address: PO Box 1110, Clarendon, TX 79226-1110

- Amarillo Globe-News

Owner: Morris Communications LLC
Founded: 1909, (as the Amarillo Daily News)
Darci Heiskell is the editor of the Amarillo Globe-News
Mailing address: 900 S. Harrison, Amarillo, TX 79101
Web Site: Amarillo Globe-News: Local News, Politics & Sports in Amarillo, TX

- Lubbock Avalanche-Journal

Owner: Morris Communications LLC
Founded: 1900
James Bennett is the editor of the Lubbock Avalanche-Journal
Mailing address: 710 Ave. J, Lubbock, TX 79401
Web Site: Lubbock Avalanche-Journal: Local News, Politics & Sports in Lubbock, TX

=== Television ===
- 2 KACV

PBS
City: Amarillo, Texas
Owner: Amarillo Junior College
Web Site: kacv.org
Station Info: Digital Educational Full-Power

- 4 KAMR

NBC ID: "KAMR Local 4 News"
City: Amarillo, TX
Owner: Nexstar Media Group
Web Site: KAMR – MyHighPlains.com
Station Info: Digital Full-Power

- 7 KVII

ABC ID: "ABC 7 News"
City: Amarillo, TX
Owner: Sinclair Broadcast Group
Web Site: Amarillo News, Weather, Sports, Breaking News
Station Info: Digital Full-Power

- 10 KFDA

CBS ID: "NewsChannel 10"
City: Amarillo, TX
Owner: Raycom Media
Web Site: Home – KFDA – NewsChannel 10 / Amarillo News, Weather, Sports
Station Info: Digital Full-Power

- 14 KCIT

FOX ID: "KCIT Fox 14"
City: Amarillo, TX
Owner: Mission Broadcasting (operated by Nexstar Media Group
Web Site: KAMR – MyHighPlains.com
Station Info: Digital full-power

== Events ==
Memphis is home to the Annual Traditional Bowhunters 3D target competition and Annual Country Club Memorial Day Tournament. The 3D competition is a group of targets set up along the plainsman archery club course. Bowhunters compete against each other scoring points for accuracy. This competition is held on the first weekend in May. The Country Club holds an annual golf tournament on Memorial Day.

== Notable people ==
- Larry Combest, U.S. Representative from 1985 to 2003
- Jack English Hightower, Democrat, U.S. Representative from 1975 to 1985
- Warren D.C. Hall, served as Secretary of War while Texas was a republic
- Lou Wills Hildreth, American Southern gospel performer, songwriter, talent agent and television host
- Blues Boy Willie, blues singer

== Gallery ==
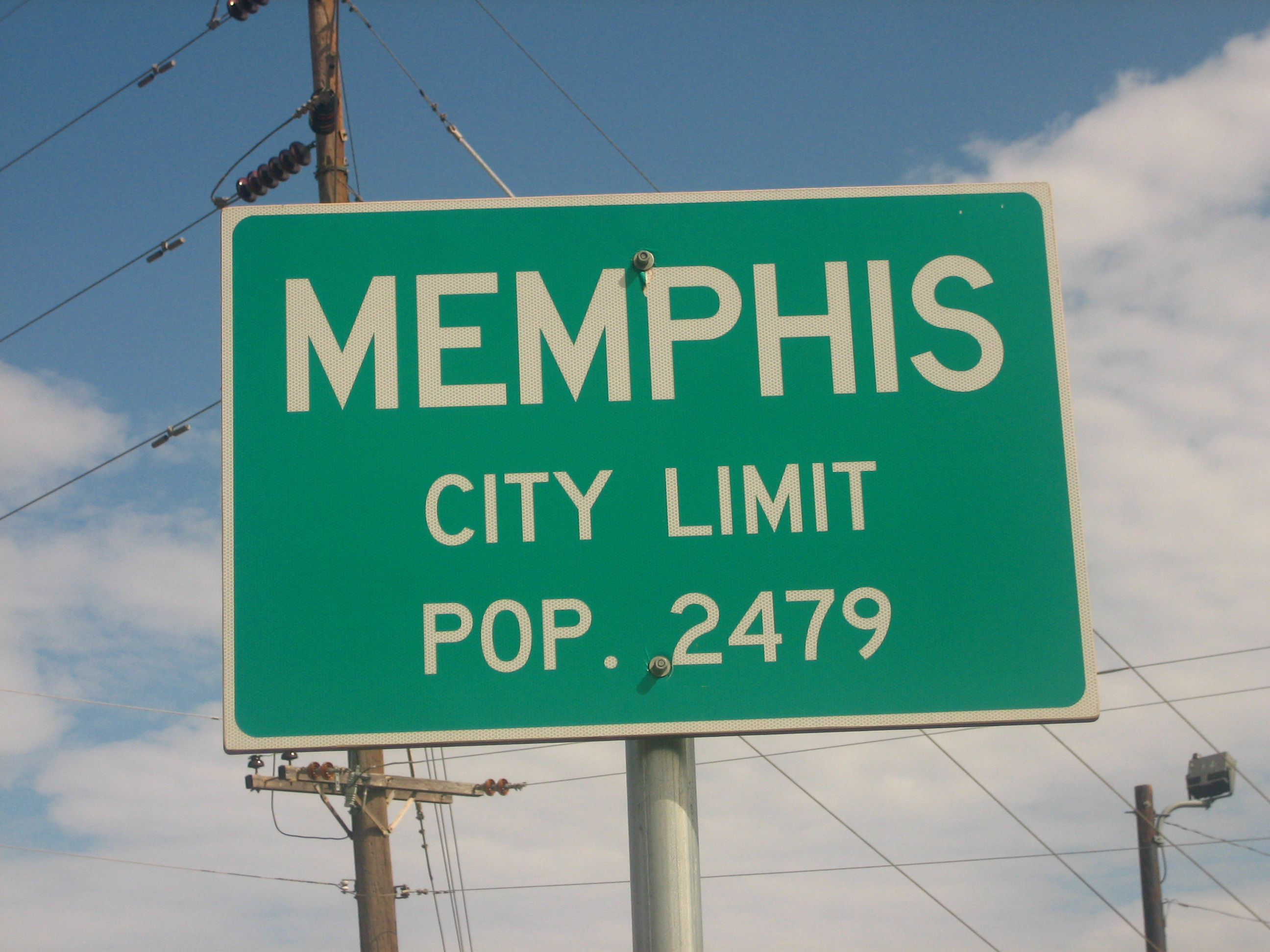
2000 Incorporation sign

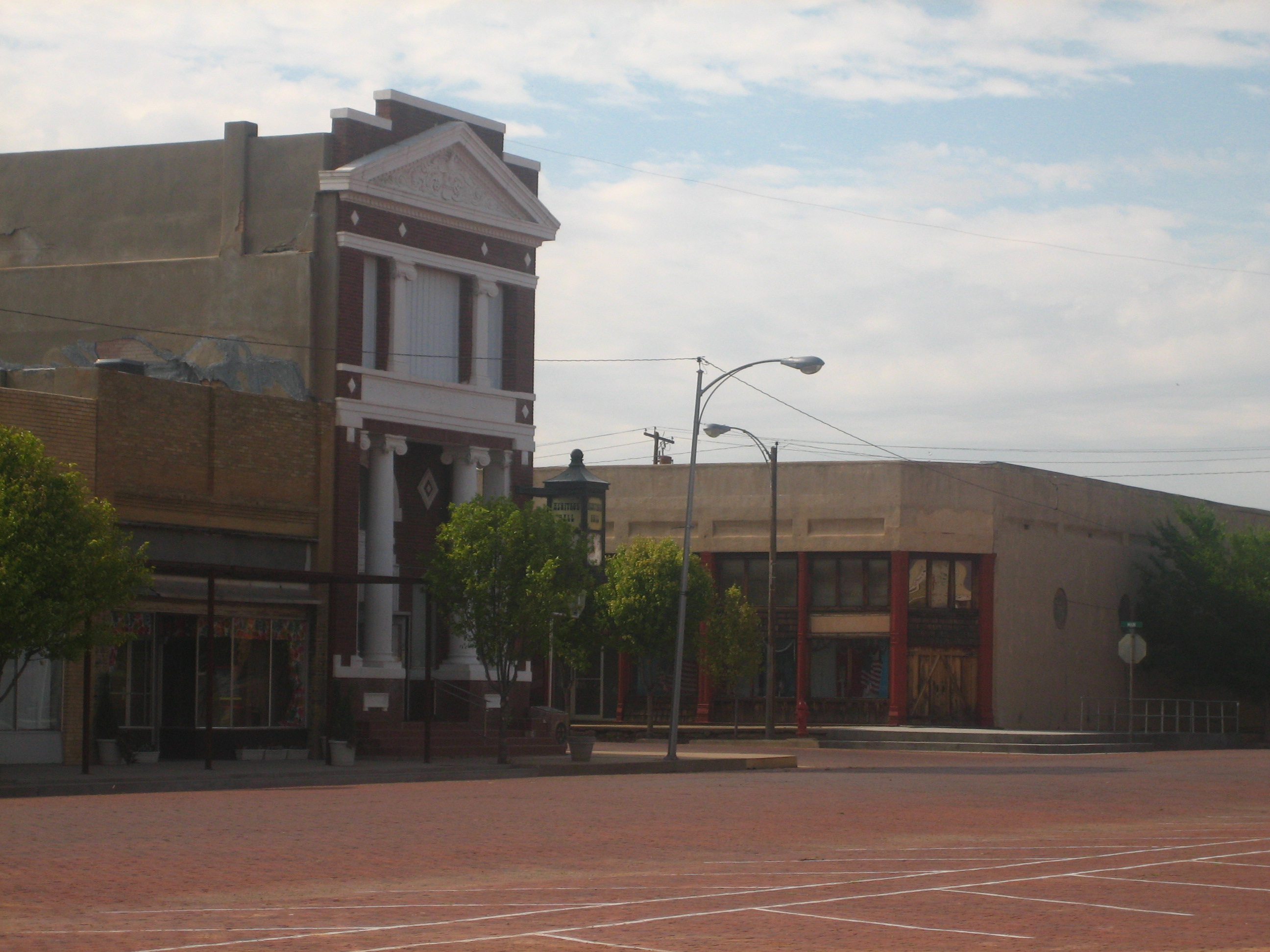
Downtown Memphis

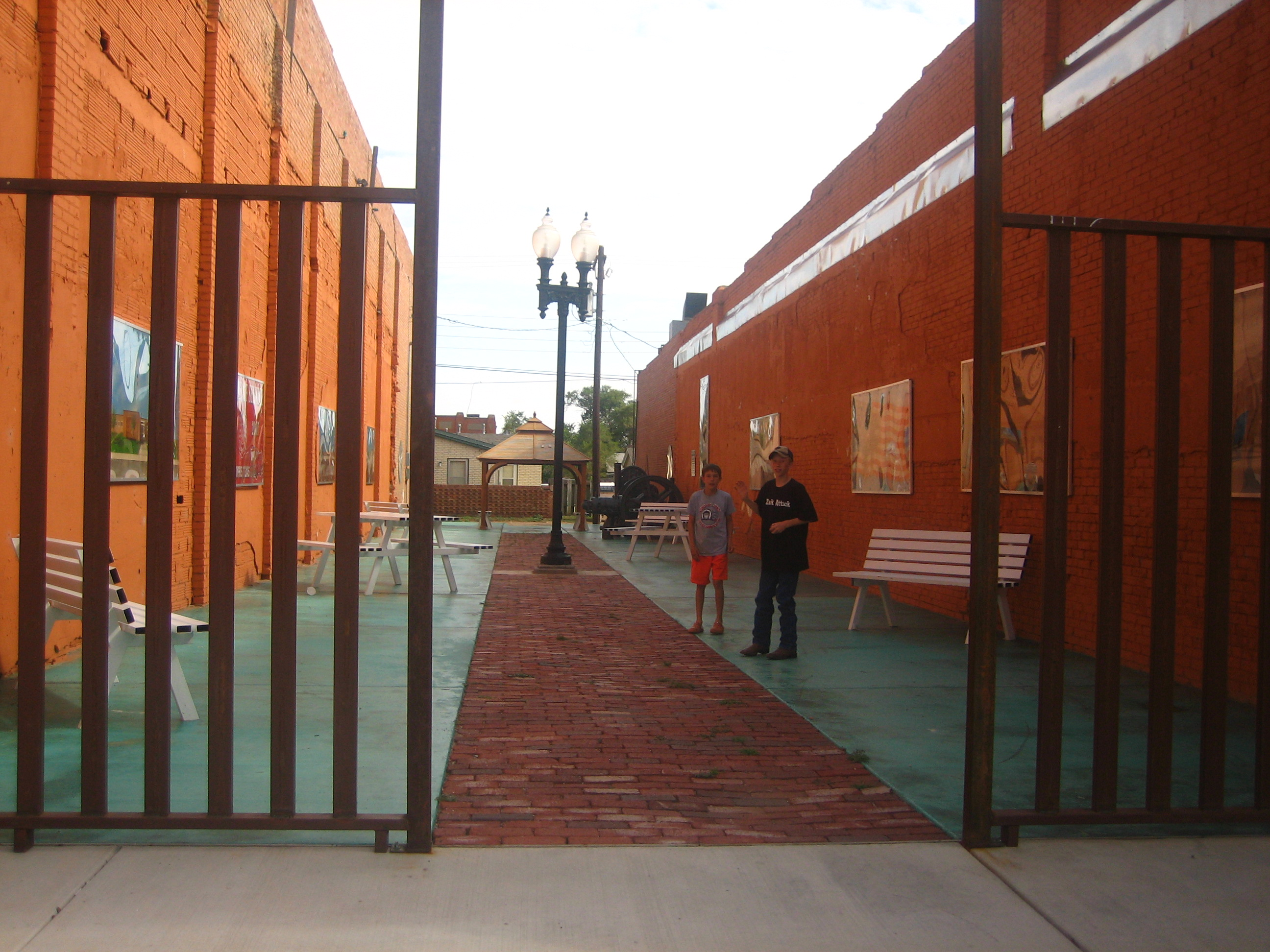
Les Sims Memorial Park
