= KLSR-FM =

- Memphis, Texas; United States
- Broadcast area: Childress, Texas; Shamrock, Texas; Wellington, Texas; Clarendon, Texas
- Frequency: 105.3 MHz
- Branding: The Big Station

Programming
- Format: Country music Variety

Ownership
- Owner: Davis Broadcast Co., Inc.

History
- First air date: 1982

Technical information
- Licensing authority: FCC
- Facility ID: 26169
- Class: C1
- ERP: 100,000 watts
- HAAT: 148 meters (486 ft)
- Transmitter coordinates: 34.8644°N 100.6157°W

Links
- Public license information: Public file; LMS

KLSR-FM 105.3 FM is a radio station licensed to Memphis, Texas. The station broadcasts a format consisting of Country music during the week and a variety of music on weekends. KLSR-FM is owned by Davis Broadcast Co., Inc.
