= Clarendon College (Texas) =

Community college in Clarendon, Texas, U.S.

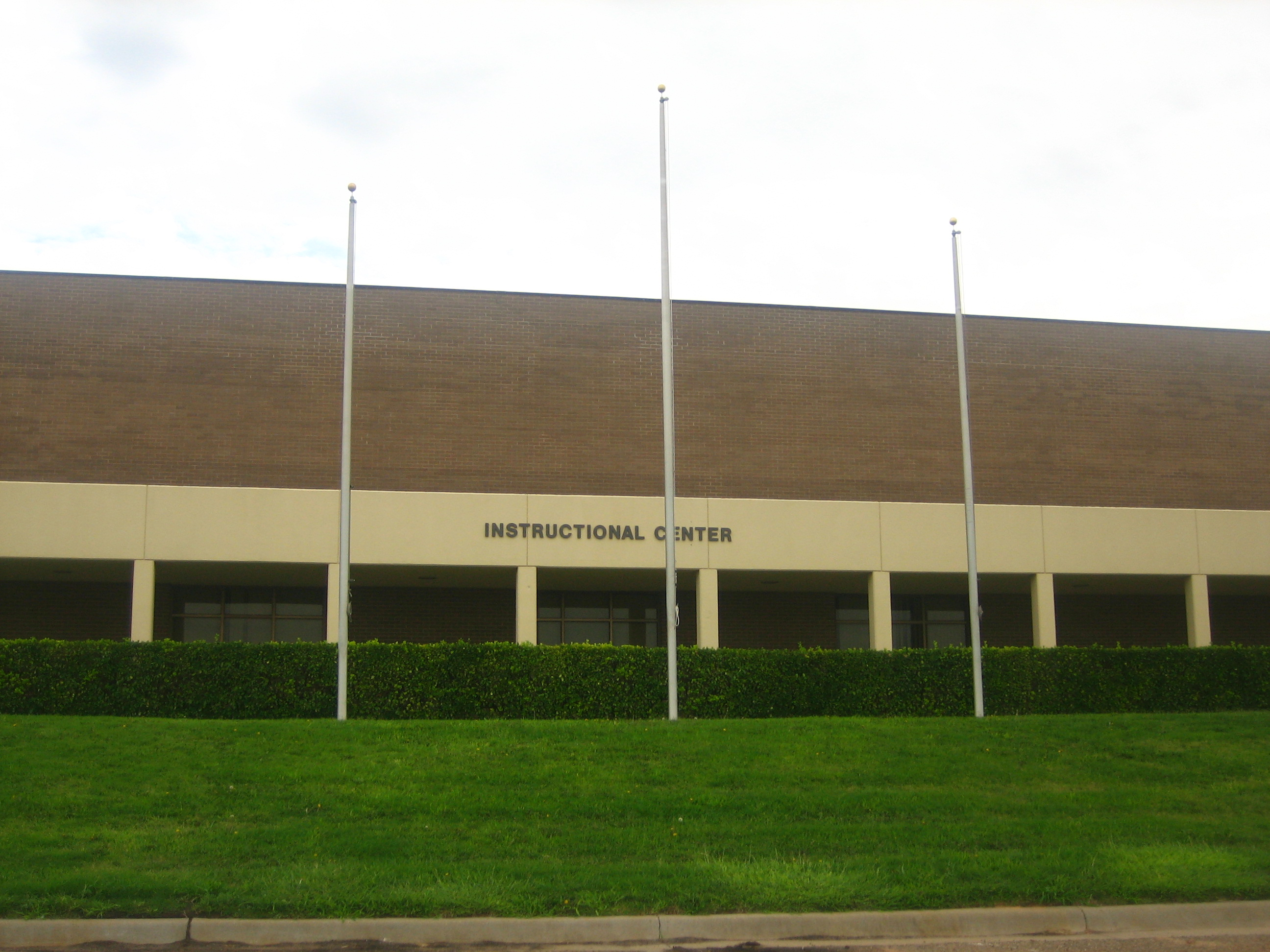
- Clarendon College Instructional Center
- Type: Public community college
- Established: 1898
- President: Tex Buckhaults
- Students: 1,417 (Fall 2021)
- Location: Clarendon, Texas, United States; 34°56′40″N 100°54′11″W
- Mascot: Bulldog
- Website: www.clarendoncollege.edu

Clarendon College is a public community college in Clarendon, Texas. It also operates branch campuses in Pampa and Childress. The college was established in 1898 by the Methodist Episcopal Church, South and administered as a private institution until 1927 when it became a publicly supported two-year institution.

As defined by the Texas Legislature, the official service area of Clarendon College is Armstrong, Briscoe, Childress, Collingsworth, Donley, Gray, Hall, and Wheeler Counties.

== Notable alumni ==
- Blues Boy Willie, African American blues music singer
- Harold Dow Bugbee, Western artist
- Roy Furr, founder of Furr's chain of grocery stores and cafeterias
- Radie Britain, musician
- Bill Sarpalius, a former Democratic member of the Texas State Senate and the United States House of Representatives
- Ryan Rohlinger, third baseman for the San Francisco Giants
