= List of museums in the Texas Panhandle =

This article was split from List of museums in Texas

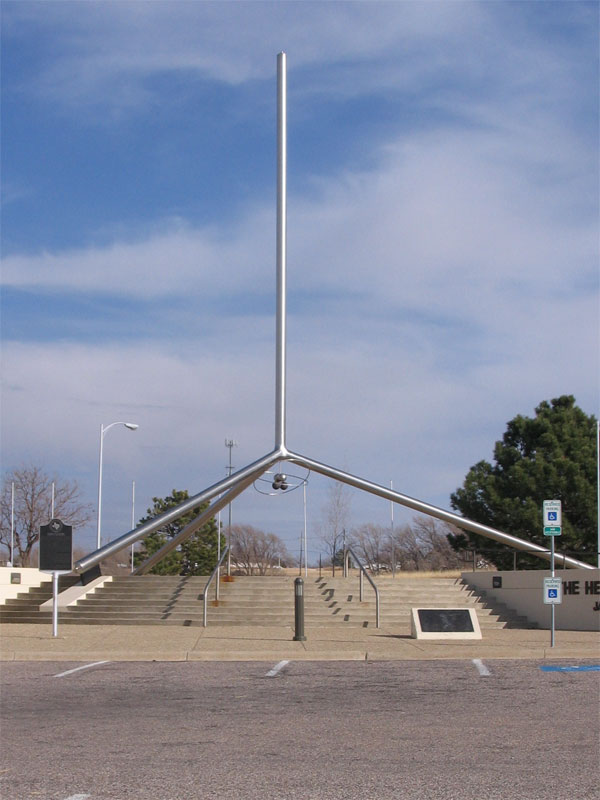
The Helium Monument & Time Capsule is located in front of the Don Harrington Discovery Center

The list of museums in the Texas Panhandle encompasses museums defined for this context as institutions (including nonprofit organizations, government entities, and private businesses) that collect and care for objects of cultural, artistic, scientific, or historical interest and make their collections or related exhibits available for public viewing. Museums that exist only in cyberspace (i.e., virtual museums) are not included. Also included are non-profit art galleries and exhibit spaces.

== Texas Panhandle ==
The Texas Panhandle is a region of the U.S. state of Texas consisting of the northernmost 26 counties in the state. The panhandle is a rectangular area bordered by New Mexico to the west and Oklahoma to the north and east. The Handbook of Texas defines the southern border of Swisher County to be the southern boundary of the Texas Panhandle region.

According to the Panhandle Regional Planning Commission, the following counties constitute the Texas Panhandle:

- Armstrong County
- Briscoe County
- Carson County
- Castro County
- Childress County
- Collingsworth County
- Dallam County
- Deaf Smith County
- Donley County
- Gray County
- Hall County
- Hansford County
- Hartley County
- Hemphill County
- Hutchinson County
- Lipscomb County
- Moore County
- Ochiltree County
- Oldham County
- Parmer County
- Potter County
- Randall County
- Roberts County
- Sherman County
- Swisher County
- Wheeler County

== Museums in the Texas Panhandle, listed by county ==
=== Armstrong - Donley ===
List of museums in the Armstrong - Donley counties
Museum name	Image	City	County	Notes	Refs
Armstrong County Museum	Armstrong County Museum	Claude	Armstrong	Art, local history and culture, includes the museum, art gallery, the historic Gem Theatre, Hall of Honor, a one-room school house	
Charles and Mary Ann Goodnight Ranch State Historic Site	Charles and Mary Ann (Molly) Goodnight Ranch House	Goodnight	Armstrong	Operated by the Armstrong County Museum, late 19th-century pioneer home of rancher Charles Goodnight, visitor center exhibits about the Goodnights, bison, and transportation and settlement of the area National Register of Historic Places listings in Armstrong County, Texas	
Old Jail Museum		Silverton	Briscoe	Prison	
Carson County Square House Museum	Carson County Square House Museum	Panhandle	Carson	Recorded Texas Historic Landmark, National Register of Historic Places	
Castro County Museum		Dimmitt	Castro		
Childress County Heritage Museum	Childress County Heritage Museum	Childress	Childress	Recorded Texas Historic Landmark	
Collingsworth County Museum	Collingsworth County Museum	Wellington	Collingsworth	Art, local history and period artifacts	
XIT Museum	XIT Museum sign	Dalhart	Dallam	Artifacts from the old XIT Ranch era	
Deaf Smith County Historical Museum	Deaf Smith County Historical Museum	Hereford	Deaf Smith	Recorded Texas Historic Landmark	
Saints' Roost Museum	Saints' Roost Museum sign	Clarendon	Donley	Clarendon was nicknamed "Saints' Roost" in the 19th century, for its proliferation of local churches and absence of saloons	

=== Gray ===
List of museums in Gray County, Texas
Museum name	Image	City	County	Notes	Refs
Devils Rope Barbed Wire Museum	Devils Rope Barbed Wire Museum	McLean	Gray	History of barbed wire in Texas	
Freedom Museum		Pampa	Gray	Military equipment and memorabilia, housed in a building erected in 1939 by the WPA	
McLean-Alanreed Area Museum		McLean	Gray	Ranching heritage, Titanic Shipwreck connection, Mclean WWII POW encampment	
White Deer Land Museum		Pampa	Gray	Recorded Texas Historic Landmark, National Register of Historic Places	
Woody Guthrie Folk Music Center		Pampa	Gray	Guthrie lived in Pampa 1928–1937, and attended Pampa High School	

=== Hall - Hutchinson ===
List of museums in the Hall - Hutchinson counties
Museum name	Image	City	County	Notes	Refs
Bob Wills Museum		Turkey	Hall	Life of musician Bob Wills, who spent much of his boyhood in Hall County	
Hall County Heritage Hall Museum		Memphis	Hall	Local history	
Turkey Roost Museum		Turkey	Hall	Local history	
Stationmaster's House Museum		Spearman	Hansford	Recorded Texas Historic Landmark	
XIT Museum		Dalhart	Hartley County	Collection of artifacts from the XIT Ranch (1885 - 1912)	
Citadelle Art Foundation Museum	Citadelle Art Foundation Museum	Canadian	Hemphill	Originally housed the First Baptist Church, later serving as a residential home for the Abraham family who conveyed the property and its grounds to the city.	
River Valley Pioneer Museum		Canadian	Hemphill	Historic interpretation of the settlement period in the eastern Texas Panhandle	
Hutchinson County Historical Museum	Hutchinson County Historical Museum	Borger	Hutchinson	Recorded Texas Historic Landmark	
Isaac McCormick Pioneer Cottage		Stinnett	Hutchinson	Constructed in 1899, McCormick was the area's first settler	

=== Lipscomb - Oldham ===
List of museums in the Lipscomb - Oldham counties
Museum name	Image	City	County	Notes	Refs
Wolf Creek Heritage Museum		Lipscomb	Lipscomb	Local culture, history and art	
Window on the Plains Museum and Art Center	Window on the Plains Museum and Art Center	Dumas	Moore	Formerly the Moore County Historical Museum, features period home, farming and business displays	
Museum of the Plains		Perryton	Ochiltree	History, artifacts and period pieces	
Adrian Lion's Club Farm and Ranch Museum		Adrian	Oldham	Antique farm equipment	
Dot's Mini Museum		Vega	Oldham	Only available to be viewed from the outside	
Julians Bivins Museum		Boys Ranch	Oldham	Recorded Texas Historic Landmark	
Milburn-Price Culture Museum		Vega	Oldham	Non-profit, local history	
Oldham County Heritage Farm & Ranch Museum		Vega	Oldham	Antique farm and ranch equipment	

=== Parmer - Potter ===
List of museums in the Parmer - Potter counties
Museum name	Image	City	County	Notes	Refs
Parmer County Pioneer Heritage Museum		Friona	Parmer	Local history	
Amarillo College Natural History Museum		Amarillo	Potter	Mammals, birds, fish, insects and	
Amarillo Historical Museum		Amarillo	Potter	Local history	
Amarillo Museum of Art	Amarillo Museum of Art	Amarillo	Potter	Varied collection	
Amarillo Railroad Museum		Amarillo	Potter	Model railway layouts	
American Quarter Horse Hall of Fame and Museum		Amarillo	Potter	History and heritage of the American Quarter Horse	
Cadillac Ranch	Cadillac Ranch, Amarillo, Texas	Amarillo	Potter and Randall	Located along the old U.S. Route 66 Created by businessman Stanley Marsh III	
Don Harrington Discovery Center	Don Harrington Discovery Center	Amarillo	Potter	Hands-on exhibits on natural history and core sciences	
Harrington House		Amarillo	Potter	20th-century house with French and English antiques and fine decorative items<	
Jack Sisemore Traveland RV Museum		Amarillo	Potter	Collection of vintage RV	
Kwahadi Museum of the American Indian		Amarillo	Potter	Art and culture of Pueblo and Plains people	
Texas Air & Space Museum	Texas Air & Space Museum	Amarillo	Potter	Aviation	
Texas Pharmacy Museum		Amarillo	Potter	Part of Texas Tech University in the Health Sciences Center	

=== Randall - Wheeler ===
List of museums in the Randall - Wheeler counties
Museum name	Image	City	County	Notes	Refs
Panhandle-Plains Historical Museum	Panhandle-Plains Historical Museum	Canyon	Randall	Campus of West Texas A&M University	
Memory Lane Car Museum		Pecos	Reeves		
Texas Rodeo Hall of Fame		Pecos	Reeves	American West	
West of The Pecos Museum		Pecos	Reeves	Recorded Texas Historic Landmark	
Roberts County Museum		Miami	Roberts	Local history	
Sherman County Depot Museum		Stratford	Sherman	Located in the Santa Fe Depot building	
Swisher County Museum		Tulia	Swisher	Recorded Texas Historic Landmark	
Old Mobeetie Jail Museum		Mobeetie	Wheeler	Recorded Texas Historic Landmark	
Pioneer West Museum	Pioneer West Museum	Shamrock	Wheeler	25-room museum located in the 1928 Reynolds hotel	
Tower Station and U-Drop Inn	U-Drop Inn	Shamrock	Wheeler	Restored 1936 Art Deco gas station/inn/restaurant on Route 66, now houses a museum, visitors’ center, gift shop and the city's Chamber of Commerce	

== Defunct museums ==
- Texas Tornado Museum, Amarillo

== See also ==
- List of museums in Texas
- List of museums in East Texas
- List of museums in the Texas Gulf Coast
- List of museums in North Texas
- List of museums in Central Texas
- List of museums in South Texas
- List of museums in West Texas

== Resources ==
- Texas Association of Museums
- Historic House Museums in Texas
