= Silverton =

Silverton may refer to:

== Places ==
=== Australia ===
- Silverton, New South Wales
  - Silverton Wind Farm
- Silverton, South Australia

=== Canada ===
- Silverton, British Columbia

=== South Africa ===
- Silverton, Pretoria

=== United Kingdom ===
- Silverton, Devon, England
  - Silverton Park
  - Silverton railway station
- Silverton, Dumbarton, Scotland

=== United States ===
- Silverton, Colorado
  - Silverton Mountain
  - Silverton Railroad
- Silverton, Idaho
- Silverton Township, Pennington County, Minnesota
- Silverton, Missouri
- Silverton, New Jersey
- Silverton, Oregon
  - Silverton Hospital
  - Silverton reservoir
- Silverton, Ohio
- Silverton, Texas
- Silverton, Washington
- Silverton, West Virginia

== Other uses ==
- Silverton (surname)
- Silverton Las Vegas, a hotel and casino in Enterprise, Nevada, U.S.
- Southern & Silverton Rail, formerly Silverton Rail, an Australian rail operator
  - Silverton Tramway
- Silverton Partners, an American venture capital firm
- Silverton, Oklahoma, a fictional place in Into the Storm (2014 film)
- HMS Silverton (L115), a Royal Navy ship
- Silverton High School (disambiguation)

== See also ==
- Silvertone (disambiguation)
- Silvertown, a district of London, England
