= Molly Goodnight =

American rancher (1839–1926)

Mary Ann Goodnight
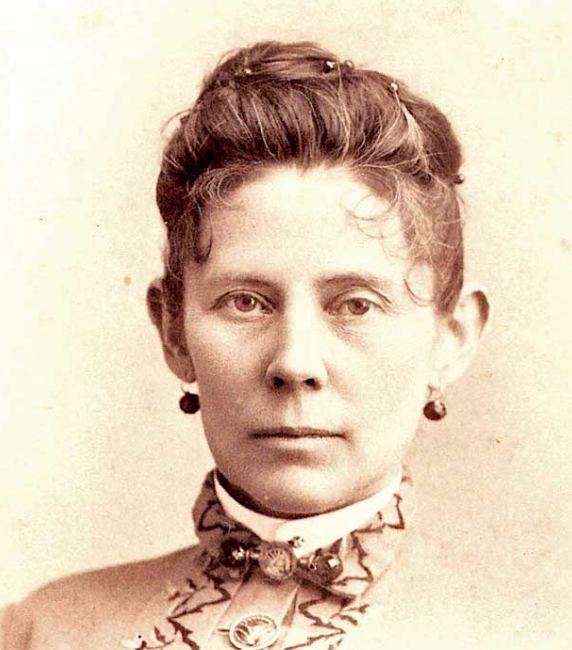
- Occupation: Rancher, Conservationist and Educator
- Born: September 12, 1839; Madison County, Tennessee, US
- Died: April 11, 1926 (aged 86); Armstrong County, Texas, US
- Resting place: 35.04674°N 101.17488°W

Mary Ann Dyer Goodnight (September 12, 1839 – April 11, 1926) was an American cattlewoman, conservationist, and educator. She was a 1991 inductee of the National Cowgirl Museum and Hall of Fame. Goodnight is credited with saving the Southern plains bison from extinction.

== Life ==
Mary Ann (Molly) Goodnight was born Mary Ann Dyer on September 12, 1839, in Madison County, Tennessee. Mary Ann's father, Joel Henry Dyer, fought in the Battle of New Orleans and was the Attorney General of West Tennessee. Mary Ann's mother, Susan Lynch Miller, was the granddaughter of William Blount, the first territorial governor of Tennessee. Mary Ann did not have a formal education, as there were no formal schools while growing up in Tennessee. However, Mary Ann was taught by her parents from a young age and knew how to read and write.

In 1854, when she was 14, Mary Ann's parents brought her to Belknap, Texas. Not long after, her parents died, then she had to care for her three youngest brothers. Around 1864, she met Charles Goodnight at Fort Belknap. In the 1860s, she taught in Weatherford, Texas. While Mary Ann taught, her soon to be husband, Charles, and his cattle partner Oliver Loving created the Goodnight-Loving Trail, which was a cattle drive in the late 1860s for the movement of large herds of Texas Longhorns from Texas to Southern Wyoming. Mary Ann married Charles Goodnight in Hickman, Kentucky at N.P. Harness' home on July 26, 1870. The preacher that officiated the marriage was Rev. N.N. Cowgill of St. Paul's Episcopal Church. The Goodnights went straight from Hickman, KY, to Pueblo, CO to live at the recently established Rock Canon Ranch. Upon their arrival in Pueblo, Mary Ann witnessed two cattle rustlers hung from a telegraph pole by the command of her new husband, Charles. This upset Mary Ann but she persisted and eventually grew fond of her new found home by playing an active role in the community. A devout Methodist, Mary Ann established the first Southern Methodist Church in Pueblo.

== Ranching ==
The Goodnights had a seven-year try at ranching in Pueblo, CO, but soon moved back to Texas after the Panic of 1873. Mary Ann was sent to live with relatives in California while Charles plotted his next moves. In 1876, Charles established a partnership with wealthy businessman John George Adair. Charles' partnership enabled him to co-found the famous JA Ranch in Palo Duro Canyon in the Texas Panhandle in 1876.

Mary Ann Goodnight took on several roles while at the JA Ranch. She acted as the ranch manager when Charles was away on business, nursed cowboys back to health with folk medicine, acted as a spiritual advisor for those in troubled times, and patched the cowboys outfits. Beyond her regular chores, Mary Ann convinced her husband Charles to bring her bison calves left behind by buffalo hunters, soon establishing the Goodnight Bison Herd. The Goodnight Bison Herd and its descendants are the last vestige of Southern Plains Bison. They can be found at Caprock Canyons State Park and are known as the Texas State Bison Herd. In 1888, Mary Ann moved into the Goodnight Ranch House, where she would spend the next 38 years of her life.

== Death and legacy ==
In 1888, the Goodnight's built the Goodnight Ranch House in Goodnight, Texas. Mary Ann played an important role in building her community, often visiting pioneer families and inviting them into her home, where she entertained and hosted dinners. Seeing a need for higher education in the Texas Panhandle, Mary Ann Goodnight established Goodnight College in 1898, with funding from the Goodnight Bison Herd. The Goodnight College was a co-educational institution and operated until 1917 when it closed its doors. In 1918, the former Goodnight College was transitioned into an Annex for Buckner's Family Home, housing over 150 children without families. This transition was supported by the Goodnight's, who were known for their charity and philanthropic work.

Shortly before Mary Ann died, she advocated for Palo Duro Canyon to become a National Park. Goodnight was a member of the Palo Duro National Park Association and attended board meetings. Palo Duro Canyon never became a National Park, but in 1933 the Northwestern section of the canyon system became Palo Duro Canyon State Park. After battling a brief illness, Goodnight died at her home on April 11, 1926.

Mary Ann (Molly) Goodnight lived at the Goodnight Ranch House from 1888 until her death in 1926.

Charles and Mary Ann's house is located in Armstrong County, Texas, at US 287 and 5000 Block County Road 25. It was listed on the National Register of Historic Places in 2007. The Goodnight Ranch House is apart of the Charles and Mary Ann Goodnight Ranch State Historic Site and can be toured for a minimal fee.
