= Fairview, Armstrong County, Texas =

- Unincorporated community
- Location within Texas Location within the United States
- Coordinates: 35°06′13″N 101°32′31″W
- Country: United States
- State: Texas
- County: Armstrong
- Elevation: 3,484 ft (1,062 m)
- Time zone: UTC-6 (Central (CST))
  - Summer (DST): UTC-5 (CDT)
- Area code: 806
- GNIS feature ID: 1379751

Fairview is an unincorporated community in Armstrong County, Texas, United States. According to the Handbook of Texas, the community had a population of 75 in 2000. The community is part of the Amarillo Metropolitan Statistical Area.

== History ==
A church in Washburn was used by Methodists until a church was built in the community in 1902. It was used until 1948. Its population was 75 in 2000.

== Geography ==
Fairview is located on Farm to Market Road 1151, 12 mi (19 km) west of Claude in western Armstrong County.

== Education ==
The community continues to be served by the Claude ISD to this day.
