= Denton Fox =

American football player (1947–2013)

Fox Denton
Profile
- Position: Cornerback

Personal information
- Born: May 21, 1947; Claude, Texas, U.S.
- Died: April 29, 2013 (aged 65)
- Listed height: 6 ft 3 in (1.91 m)
- Listed weight: 200 lb (91 kg)

Career information
- High school: Claude (TX)
- College: Texas Tech
- NFL draft: 1970: 3rd round, 75th overall pick

Career history
- Dallas Cowboys (1970)*; Chicago Bears (1970)*; New Orleans Saints (1971)*
- * Offseason or practice squad member only

Awards and highlights
- First-team All-American (1969); First-team All-SWC (1969)

Denton Fox (May 21, 1947 – April 29, 2013) was an American football cornerback who played college football at Texas Tech University. He was recognized as a second-team All-American in 1969.

== Early life ==
Fox graduated from Claude High School in Claude, Texas, where he practiced football, basketball and track. He accepted a football scholarship to attend Texas Tech University, where he was a three-year starter for the Texas Tech Red Raiders football team from 1967 to 1969.

His combination of size and speed was uncommon at the time for a cornerback. During his 1969 senior season, he had four interceptions (one returned for a touchdown); while receiving first-team All-Southwest Conference (SWC) and second-team All-American honors from the Associated Press (AP). He finished his college career with 7 interceptions.

In 1989, he was inducted into the Panhandle Sports Hall of Fame. In 2001, he was inducted into the Texas Tech Athletic Hall of Fame.

== Professional career ==
Fox was selected by the Dallas Cowboys in the third round (75th overall pick) of the 1970 NFL draft, to be used as a safety. During training camp he was limited with a foot injury he suffered in the Coaches All-America Game late in June. He was waived on August 4.

On August 6, 1970, he was claimed off waivers by the Chicago Bears and was released before the start of the regular season. On January 20, 1971, he was signed as a free agent by the New Orleans Saints. On July 13, he announced his retirement from pro football.

== Personal life ==
Fox died on April 29, 2013, two days after being hospitalized when he suffered an acute brain-stem stroke, his fourth stroke since 2010.
