= Claude High School =

Location
- Fifth & Vine; Claude, Armstrong County, Texas 79019; United States; 35.1063°N 101.3662°W

Information
- School type: Public, high school
- Locale: Rural: Distant
- School district: Claude ISD
- Superintendent: Greg Brown
- NCES School ID: 481425000900
- Principal: Brandon Holland and Kendra Sherrill
- Staff: 27.88 (on an FTE basis)
- Grades: PK–12
- Enrollment: 319 (2023–2024)
- Student to teacher ratio: 11.44
- Colors: Royal blue and crimson
- Athletics conference: UIL Class 1A
- Mascot: Mustang/Lady Mustang
- Website: Claude High School

Claude High School is a public high school located in Claude, Texas (USA) and classified as a 1A school by the UIL. It is part of the Claude Independent School District located in north central Armstrong County. During 2023–2024, Claude High School had an enrollment of 319 students and a student to teacher ratio of 11.44. The school received an overall rating of "A" from the Texas Education Agency for the 2024–2025 school year.

== Academics ==
In 2022, the school was named a National Blue Ribbon School.

== Athletics ==
The Claude Mustangs compete in the following sports:

- Baseball
- Basketball
- Cross Country
- Football
- Golf
- Softball
- Tennis
- Track and Field

=== State titles ===
- Girls Basketball
  - 1951(B), 1952(B), 1953(B), 1962(B), 1971(1A), 1972(1A)
- Girls Cross Country
  - 1991(1A)

== Notable alumni ==
- Denton Fox (1947-2013), College football All-American.
