= Silverton High School =

Silverton High School may refer to one of these U.S. high schools:

- Silverton High School (Oregon), Silverton, Oregon
- Silverton High School (Texas), Silverton, Texas
