= Joseph Holston =

American painter and printmaker

Joseph Holston (born Joseph Deweese Holston Jr., April 6, 1944) is an American painter and printmaker best known for his portrayals of the African American experience, using vivid colors and expressive lines in a cubist-abstractionist style. His media include painting, etching, silk screen, and collage.

== Life and career ==
Joseph Holston grew up in the small Black community of Hawkins Lane, in what was then a rural area of Chevy Chase, Maryland, in suburban Washington, D.C. His work reflects the strong sense of Black identity nurtured by his upbringing in that close-knit community. In 1960 the family moved to Washington, DC, where Holston was accepted into the commercial art program at Chamberlain Vocational High School.

Holston worked as a commercial artist/illustrator from 1964 to 1970. He also pursued independent study by enrolling in art classes throughout the Washington, DC area. These included classes with the noted portraitist Marcos Blahove (1928-2012). In the summer of 1971 Holston traveled to Santa Fe, New Mexico to study with artist, Richard Vernon Goetz (1915-1991), a well-known portrait, landscape, and still-life painter. Within months of returning to Washington, DC, Holston resigned from his job as a commercial artist, to begin painting full-time. The following year his painting Ghetto Boy was purchased by Texas businessman and former Postmaster General W. Marvin Watson Jr., and gifted to the collection of the Lyndon Baines Johnson Library and Museum.

Inspired by Rembrandt's prints, Holston began creating etchings in 1974. "For Joseph Holston--in every way the embodiment of the contemporary painter-engraver--etching is as integral to his creative output as is painting." Holston incorporates an array of visual effects in his etchings, through the use of hard ground, soft ground and aquatint, as in Woman with Pipe (1974), one of his first prints, now included in the permanent collection of The Phillips Collection in Washington, D. C. Other prints are included in the collection of the Smithsonian American Art Museum, among other museum collections.

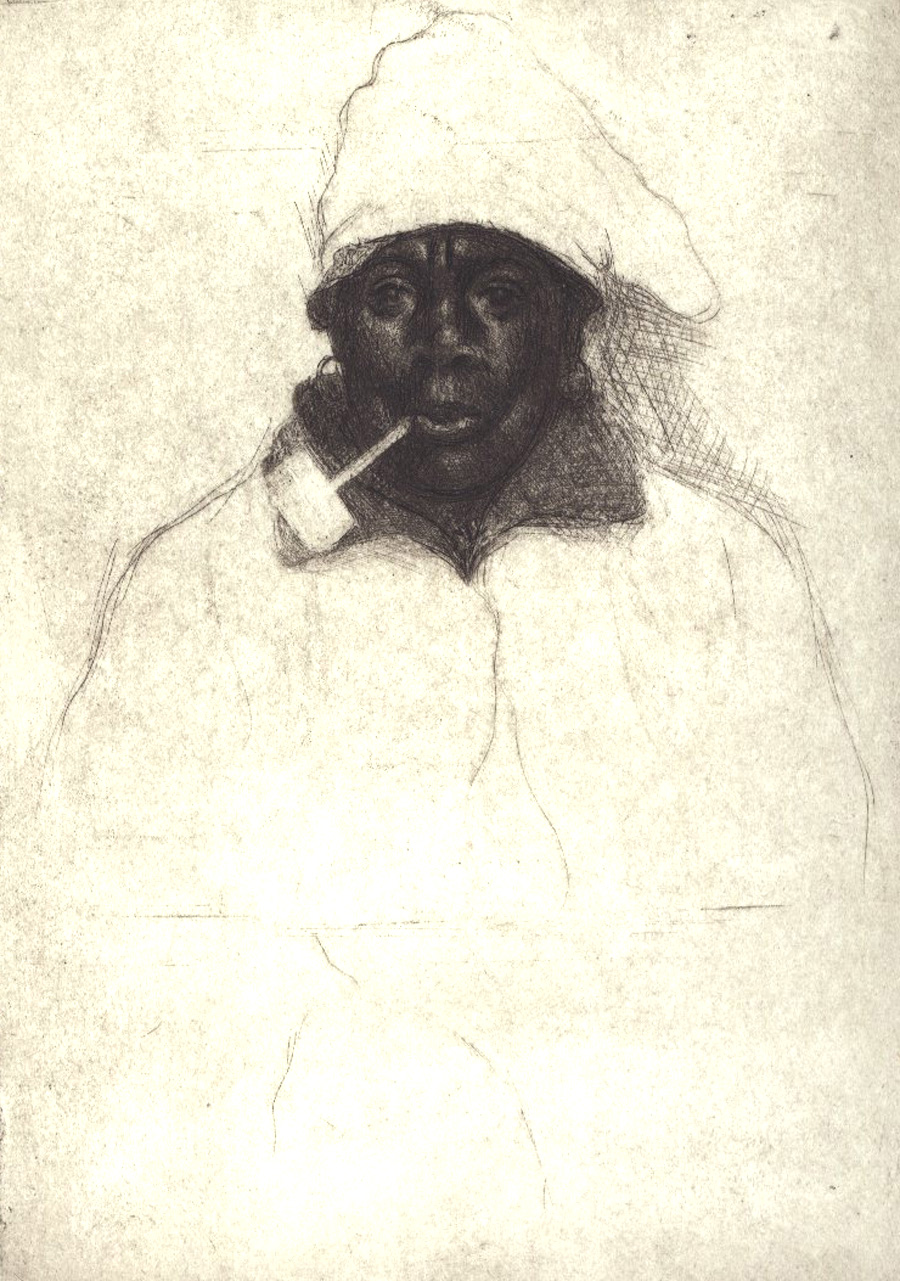
Woman with Pipe. Etching, 1975. Collection of The Phillips Collection, Washington, D.C.

His first solo museum exhibition was at the Butler Institute of American Art, in Youngstown, Ohio, in 1975. The following year, during a three-month stay in Tanzania, Holston painted and taught workshops at the University of Dar es Salaam. Holston's body of work beginning from that period reflects a gradual transition from the purely narrative and realistic to stronger statements using "bold color, expressive forms, and rhythmic lines". His artistic progression also included collage works. From 1979 to 1990, Holston expanded his knowledge of printmaking, creating etching-collagraphs, as well as screen prints. After 1990, he continued to print his own etchings, and also began working with a master screen printer. A retrospective exhibition of his printmaking, Limited Editions: Joseph Holston Prints, 1974 - 2010 was exhibited at the University of Maryland's David C. Driskell Center, and at the African American Museum in Philadelphia. In 2020, Holston's oil painting The Elder, and his etching Charity were included in The Phillips Collection's centennial exhibition ″Seeing Differently: The Phillips Collects for a New Century.″

His solo exhibition Joseph Holston: Call and Response, was presented in 2024 by the Alper Initiative for Washington Art, at the American University Museum at the Katzen Arts Center.

Other major solo exhibitions were at the Washington County Museum of Fine Arts, the Southern Alleghenies Museum of Art, the Reginald F. Lewis Museum of Maryland African American History and Culture, and the Federal Reserve Arts Program in Washington, D. C. He has been Artist-in-Residence at the University of Maryland Eastern Shore, North Carolina A & T State University, and the Experimental Printmaking Institute at Lafayette College.

== Color in Freedom: Journey along the Underground Railroad ==
In 2008, Holston created a visual narrative of the journey from slavery to freedom—Color in Freedom: Journey along the Underground Railroad. The collection of over fifty paintings, etchings, and drawings is structured in four movements: I. The Unknown World depicts the stages of the movement of captive Africans through the Middle Passage and to the slave block; II. Living in Bondage--Life on the Plantation portrays slave life; III. The Journey of Escape, tracks the route to freedom, and; IV. Color in Freedom celebrates achieving the goal and new beginnings. "In embarking on this project, Holston joined the ranks of generations of artists who have created art as a vehicle to witness, reflect on, confront, question, and ultimately deepen understanding of history." Since its opening in 2008 at the University of Maryland University College, the collection has toured museums, galleries and institutions nationally and internationally. In 2010, it was exhibited at the United Nations in Geneva, Switzerland. Selections from the suite were included in 2016 in the exhibition Black Mechanics: the Making of an American University and a Nation, at Brown University, at the invitation of Brown's Center for the Study of Slavery and Justice.

== Public collections ==
- Amarillo Museum of Art
- Baltimore Museum of Art
- Butler Institute of American Art
- DuSable Museum of African American History
- Federal Reserve Board Fine Art Collection
- Georgia Museum of Art
- Library of Congress Fine Print Collection
- Honolulu Museum of Art
- Mount Holyoke College Art Museum
- North Carolina A&T State University
- Pennsylvania Academy of the Fine Arts
- Reginald F. Lewis Museum of Maryland African American History & Culture
- Schomburg Center for Research in Black Culture, New York Public Library
- Smithsonian American Art Museum
- Southern Alleghenies Museum of Art
- The Phillips Collection
- United States Mission to the United Nations in Geneva
- University of Maryland Global Campus
- Washington County Museum of Fine Arts
- Yale University Art Gallery
