= Malden, Texas =

- Unincorporated community
- Location within Texas Location within the United States
- Coordinates: 35°05′23″N 101°18′30″W
- Country: United States
- State: Texas
- County: Armstrong
- Elevation: 3,343 ft (1,019 m)
- Time zone: UTC-6 (Central (CST))
  - Summer (DST): UTC-5 (CDT)
- Area code: 806
- GNIS feature ID: 1889877

Malden is an unincorporated community in Armstrong County, Texas, United States. The community is part of the Amarillo, Texas Metropolitan Statistical Area.

== History ==
In 1995, Schweizer Aircraft sold the rights to the Ag Cat to Ag-Cat Corp. in Malden.

== Geography ==
Malden is located 6 mi (9.7 km) southeast of Claude in northern Armstrong County.

== Education ==
Malden continues to be served by the Claude ISD to this day.
