= Paloduro, Texas =

- Unincorporated community
- Location within Texas Location within the United States
- Coordinates: 34°49′01″N 101°11′18″W
- Country: United States
- State: Texas
- County: Armstrong
- Elevation: 2,838 ft (865 m)
- Time zone: UTC-6 (Central (CST))
  - Summer (DST): UTC-5 (CDT)
- Area code: 806
- GNIS feature ID: 1364737

Paloduro is an unincorporated community in Armstrong County, Texas, United States. In 2000, the population was ten. The community is part of the Amarillo Metropolitan Statistical Area.

== Education ==
The school's first community was established in 1891 and was named for range manager John E. Farrington. It was later renamed Mulberry Flat School. It joined the school in Mount Pleasant in 1937. Today, the community is served by the Claude Independent School District.
