= National Register of Historic Places listings in Armstrong County, Texas =

Location of Armstrong County in Texas

This is a list of the National Register of Historic Places listings in Armstrong County, Texas.

This is intended to be a complete list of properties and districts listed on the National Register of Historic Places in Armstrong County, Texas. The locations of National Register properties and districts (at least for all showing latitude and longitude coordinates below) may be seen in a map by clicking on "Map of all coordinates".

There are 4 properties and districts listed on the National Register in the county, including 1 National Historic Landmark

This National Park Service list is complete through NPS recent listings posted December 12, 2025.

== Current listings ==
	Name on the Register	Image	Date listed	Location	City or town	Description
1	Charles and Mary Ann (Molly) Goodnight Ranch House	Charles and Mary Ann (Molly) Goodnight Ranch House	September 20, 2007 (#07000988)	US 287 and 5000 Block County Road 25; 35°01′50″N 101°10′59″W	Goodnight	Now houses the Charles Goodnight Historical Center
2	J A Ranch	J A Ranch	October 15, 1966 (#66000807)	Palo Duro Canyon; 34°49′00″N 101°11′17″W	Palo Duro	aka Goodnight Ranch
3	Palo Duro Pen		July 12, 1984 (#84001568)	Address restricted	Claude	Smithsonian trinomial 41AM5
4	Palo Duro Shelter	Palo Duro Shelter	July 12, 1984 (#84001569)	Address restricted	Claude	Smithsonian trinomial 41AM6

== See also ==
- National Register of Historic Places listings in Texas
- Recorded Texas Historic Landmarks in Armstrong County
