= Charles and Mary Ann (Molly) Goodnight Ranch House =

Historic house in Texas, United States

- U.S. National Register of Historic Places
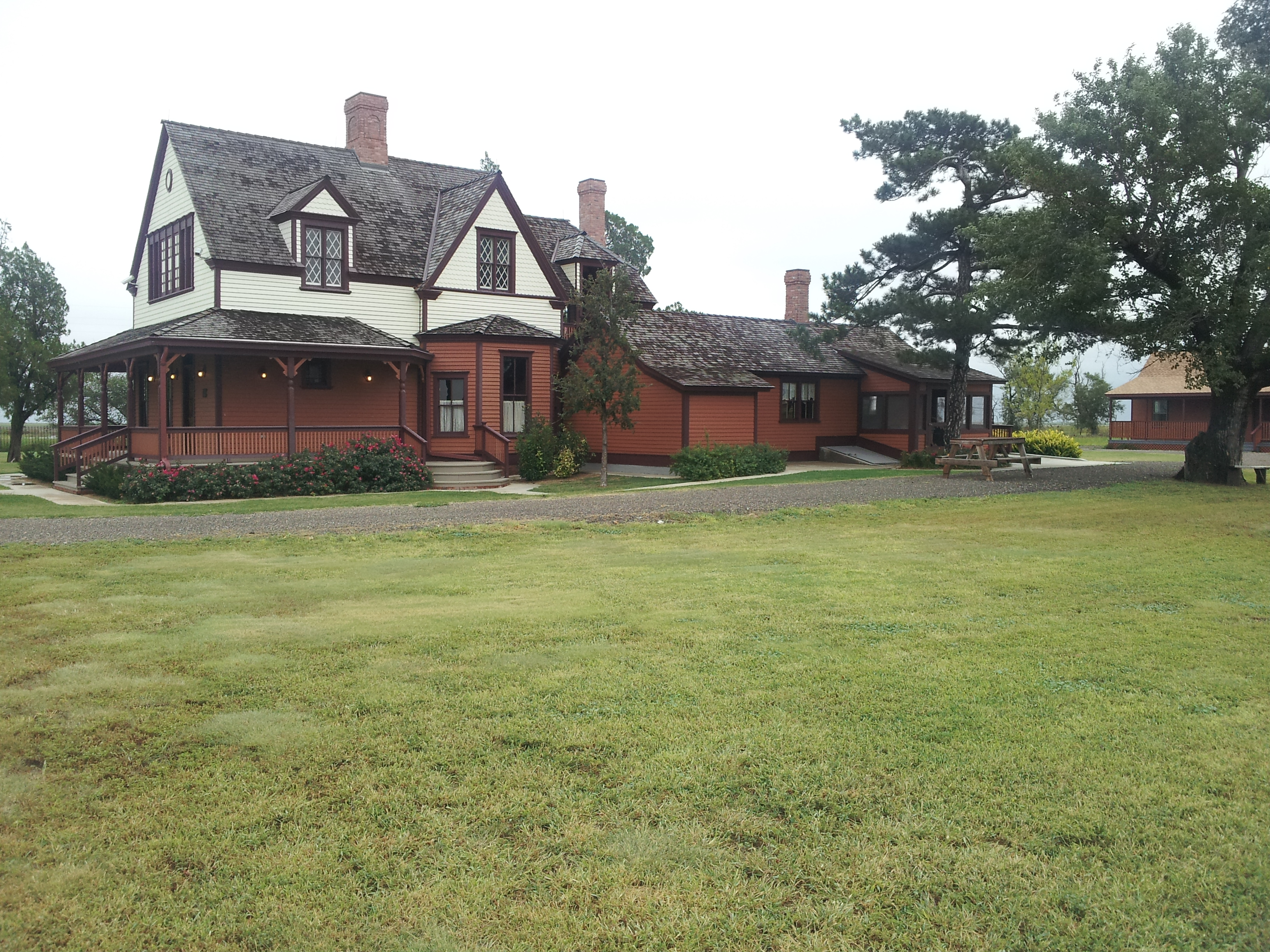
- Goodnight Ranch House in 2014

- Location within Texas Location within the United States
- Nearest city: Goodnight, Texas
- Coordinates: 35°1′50″N 101°10′59″W
- Area: 27.3 acres (11.0 ha)
- Built: 1888
- Architectural style: Late Victorian, Queen Anne
- NRHP reference No.: 07000988
- Added to NRHP: September 20, 2007

The Charles and Mary Ann (Molly) Goodnight Ranch House, in Armstrong County, Texas, United States near Goodnight, Texas, was built in 1888. It was listed on the National Register of Historic Places in 2007. It became a Texas State Historic Site in 2020 and is owned and operated by the Texas Historical Commission.

== Geography ==
The listing included four contributing buildings on 27.3 acres (11.0 ha). A predecessor building may have been incorporated as the kitchen within the complex house. Outbuildings include a carriage house, cold storage, and servants quarters buildings, and the remains of a water tower.

== History ==
It was home of Rancher Charles Goodnight (1836–1929) and his wife Mary Ann (Molly) Goodnight (1839-1926).

The design of the historic Goodnight Ranch house is based off of Design #379 from Shoppell's Modern Houses, a mail-order house plan published by the Co-operative Building Plan Association.

It housed the Charles Goodnight Historical Center, a museum owned and operated by the Armstrong County Museum until 2020. Today, the site is owned and operated by the Texas Historical Commission. The site consists of the Historic Goodnight Ranch House, Visitor Center, Learning Center, and a pasture with three descendants of the Goodnight Bison Herd.

== See also ==
- National Register of Historic Places listings in Armstrong County, Texas
