= Silverton High School (Texas) =

Location
- 700 Loretta Street; Silverton, Texas 79257-0608; United States; 34.470754°N 101.309319°W

Information
- School type: Public high school
- School district: Silverton Independent School District
- Principal: Clyde Parham
- Teaching staff: 18.77 (on an FTE basis)
- Grades: PK-12
- Enrollment: 223 (2023–2024)
- Student to teacher ratio: 11.88
- Colors: Red & White
- Athletics conference: UIL Class A
- Mascot: Owl
- Website: Silverton High School

Silverton High School or Silverton School is a public high school located in Silverton, Texas (USA) and classified as a 1A school by the UIL. It is part of the Silverton Independent School District located in western Briscoe County. For the 2024-2025 school year, the school was given an "A" by the Texas Education Agency.

== History ==
The present high school building was built in 1929 after the old building burned. In 1957, the present gymnasium and the original four rooms of the elementary building were constructed. In 1958, the Vocational Agriculture department was added to the west end of the gymnasium. Four elementary classrooms were added to the existing four in 1959. In 1964, the cafeteria was built. This building also includes the home economics department, along with other classrooms. The high school was extensively remodeled in 1970, and a new junior high wing was added to the south side of it. Partitions from the old junior high building were removed to create a football field house and weight room in 1977. A new shop was added to the existing agriculture facilities in 1978. The aging field house was razed in 1996, and a new P.E. gym and athletic field house was built. It was named O.C. Rampley Field House in honor of former Superintendent O.C. Rampley.

== Athletics ==
The Silverton Owls compete in these sports

- Basketball
- Cross Country
- 6-Man Football
- Track and Field
