= Washburn, Texas =

Unincorporated community in Texas, US

- Unincorporated community
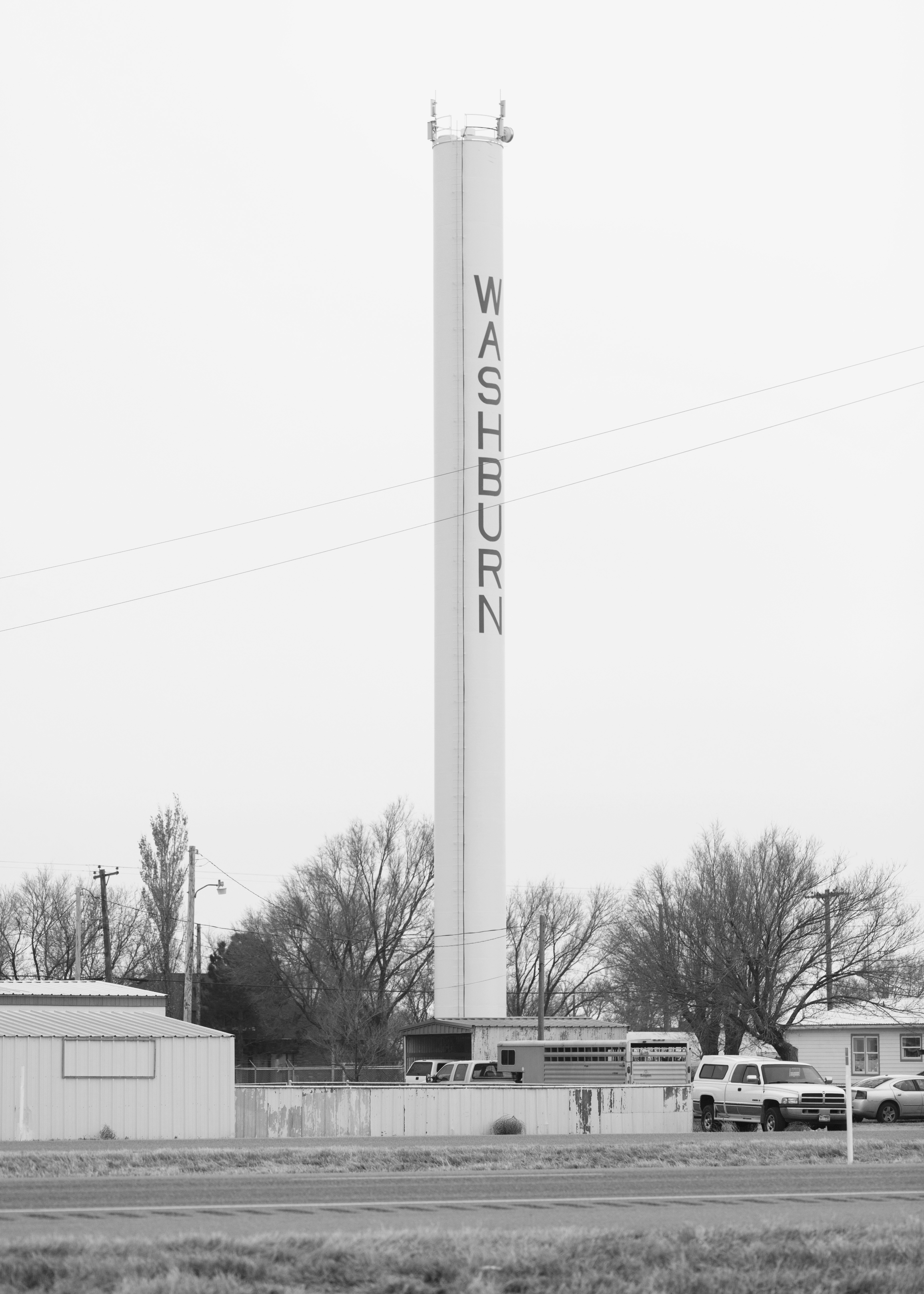

- Location of Washburn, Texas
- Coordinates: 35°10′09″N 101°34′12″W
- Country: United States of America
- State: Texas
- County: Armstrong
- Elevation: 3,524 ft (1,074 m)

Population (2000)
  - Total: 120
- Time zone: UTC-6 (CST)
  - Summer (DST): UTC-5 (CDT)
- GNIS feature ID: 2805727

Washburn is an unincorporated community and census designated place (CDP) in Armstrong County, Texas, United States. As of the 2020 census, Washburn had a population of 116. Washburn is part of the Amarillo Metropolitan Statistical Area.

== History ==
Washburn was part of the JA Ranch from 1876 until its division in 1887. Robert E. Montgomery, who owned section 98, established this townsite at the ending point of the Fort Worth and Denver Railway in August of that same year. It was named after railroad official D.W. Washburn, who was also friends with, and a son-in-law of, Union Pacific Railroad President Grenville M. Dodge. Two water wells, a double pump station, a coal chute, a section house, a depot, and stock pens were all established in the community along the Denver Road. Another railroad track was built to Panhandle in 1888 to connect it to the Southern Kansas Railway. Washburn grew to have tents, dugouts, and board shacks and was a base of operations for settlers, ranchers, and other nearby communities. A post office was established at Washburn in March 1888 and remained in operation until 1956, with James Logue as postmaster, as well as justice of the peace in the community. He established a bank in 1908, which joined the bank in Claude in 1911. It had its newspaper titled the Armstrong County Record, as well as three hotels and a building supply house in 1890 and lost its position as the county seat to nearby Claude in a close, contested election. This, along with the failure of other railroad tracks, tap line abandonment, and Amarillo emerging as a major city, caused the community's decline as people moved out and businesses failed, but the community's spirit remained alive. Telephone service arrived in 1896 from Amarillo. A Methodist church was built in the community in 1907. A Baptist church was then established in 1963. Its population was 25 from the 1930s to the 1950s and grew to 100 in 1964. It went down to 70 from 1974 to the 1980s. Washburn had a hotel, a grain elevator, and a business in 1984. Some residents commute to Amarillo for work. Its population was 104 in 1990 and grew to 120 in 2000.

Today, the community has a grain elevator in operation. It also had a general store, a lumber yard and two saloons. H.E. White owned the store, lumber yard, and elevators in the community. James Logue also donated land for a cemetery in the community.

The Panhandle and Santa Fe Railway also served the community.

== Geography ==
Washburn is located along U.S. Highway 287 in northwestern Armstrong County, approximately 20 miles east of Amarillo.

== Demographics ==
Historical population
Census	Pop.	Note	%±
2020	116		—
U.S. Decennial Census; 1850–1900 1910; 1920 1930 1940; 1950 1960 1970; 1980 1990 2000; 2010 2020

According to the Handbook of Texas, the community had an estimated population of 120 in 2000.

Washburn first appeared as a census designated place in the 2020 U.S. census.

=== 2020 Census ===
Washburn CDP, Texas – Racial and ethnic composition Note: the US Census treats Hispanic/Latino as an ethnic category. This table excludes Latinos from the racial categories and assigns them to a separate category. Hispanics/Latinos may be of any race.
Race / Ethnicity (NH = Non-Hispanic)	Pop 2020	% 2020
White alone (NH)	99	85.34%
Black or African American alone (NH)	0	0.00%
Native American or Alaska Native alone (NH)	0	0.00%
Asian alone (NH)	0	0.00%
Native Hawaiian or Pacific Islander alone (NH)	0	0.00%
Other race alone (NH)	0	0.00%
Mixed race or Multiracial (NH)	10	8.62%
Hispanic or Latino (any race)	7	6.03%
Total	116	100.00%

As of the 2020 United States census, there were 116 people, 70 households, and 63 families residing in the CDP.

== Education ==
A combination school/church building was built at Washburn in 1889. A community center was built in Washburn to modernize school campuses, improve education, and sponsor cultural events around 1920. Today, the community is served by the Claude Independent School District.
