= Goodnight, Texas (band) =

US musical group

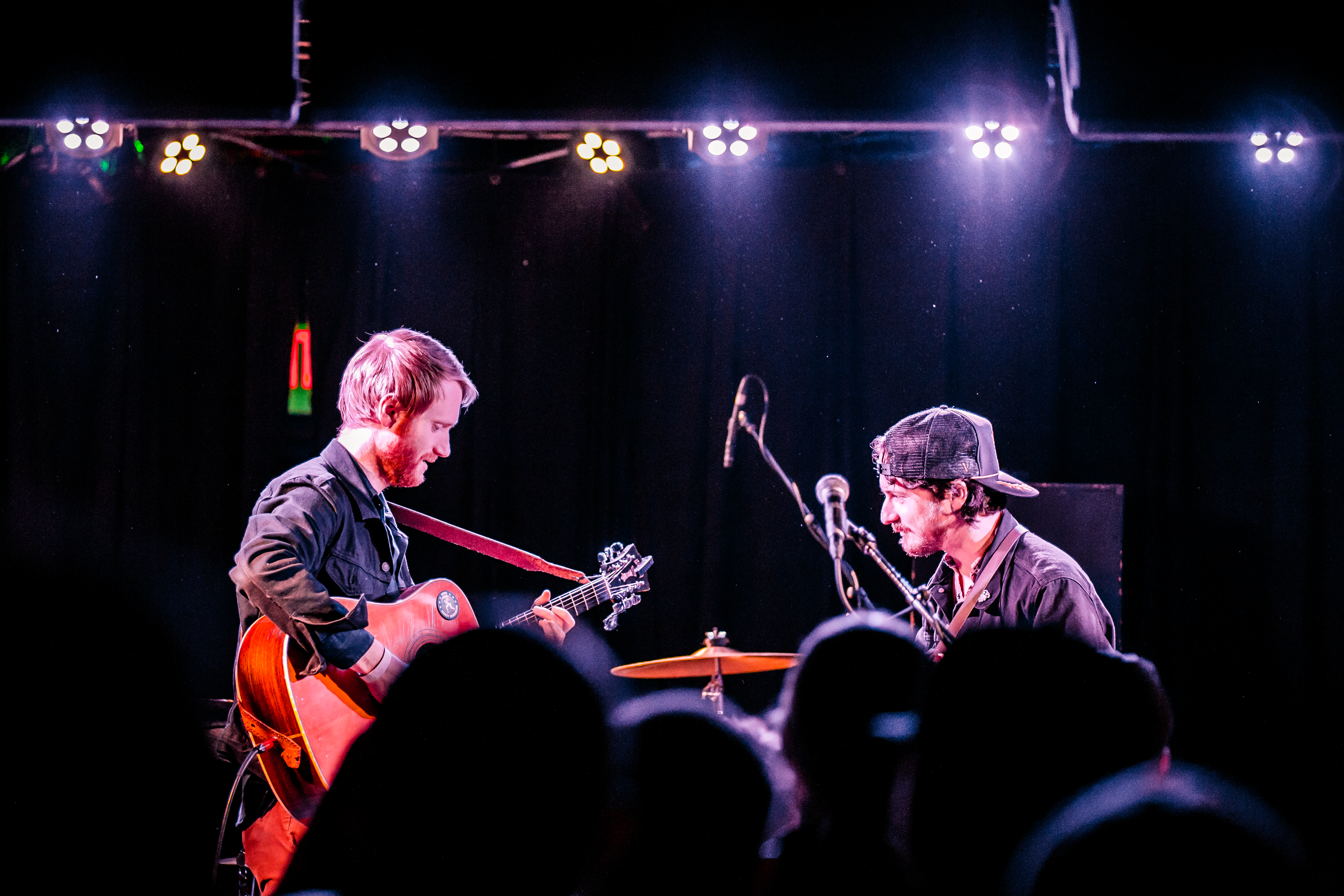
- Goodnight, Texas performing live in Minneapolis in 2018

Background information
- Origin: San Francisco, California, Chapel Hill, North Carolina, United States
- Genres: Americana
- Years active: 2010–present
- Label: 2 Cent Bank Check
- Members: Avi Vinocur; Patrick Dyer Wolf; Scott Padden; Adam Nash; Chris Sugiura
- Website: hiwearegoodnighttexashowareyou.com

Goodnight, Texas is an American folk rock band named after the town of Goodnight, Texas, the geographic midpoint between the working locations of songwriters Avi Vinocur (formerly of The Stone Foxes) in San Francisco and Patrick Dyer Wolf in Chapel Hill, North Carolina. The band has performed in the tiny town of Goodnight three times as of 2017.

== Career ==
The group's debut album A Long Life of Living was released October 2, 2012 via Tallest Man Records. On the day before its international release, the band hand delivered CD copies of their debut album to every citizen in Goodnight. The album received praise from press and the blogosphere, garnering comparisons to such diverse acts as Levon Helm, Bruce Springsteen, Elliott Smith and Punch Brothers. Their single, "Jesse Got Trapped In a Coal Mine," premiered on the renowned folk music site American Songwriter in August 2012. A performance of the song premiered exclusively on BAMM.TV shortly thereafter.

On April 26, 2017, Goodnight, Texas sang the National Anthem for the San Francisco Giants game against the LA Dodgers. The band's song "The Railroad" was featured in the 2018 "Carry The West" worldwide ad campaign for Coors Banquet beer with voiceover by actor Sam Elliott. Goodnight, Texas' "The Railroad" is the theme song for the podcast Dead Man Talking by AudioBoom.

On November 3, 2018 singer/mandolinist Vinocur appeared live with Metallica at their All Within My Hands Foundation benefit concert at the Masonic Theater in San Francisco, California handling backing vocals, mandolin, and guitar throughout the whole set. The show was released worldwide by Blackened Recordings in February 2019.

On September 6 and 8, 2019 Vinocur appeared live with Metallica singing backing vocals for their "S&M2" performances with the San Francisco Symphony on the opening night of the new Chase Center in San Francisco. The subsequent film of the performances was released three weeks later in movie theaters around the world.

Goodnight, Texas' song "The Railroad" was featured for 2 minutes straight in the opening scenes of the first episode of Netflix's #1 hit show Tiger King, released in March 2020. The show was streamed 34 million times in 10 days.

On August 12, 2020, Vinocur appeared with Metallica singing backing vocals on the song "All Within My Hands" on The Howard Stern Show to promote their upcoming S&M2 album. Being introduced by the band, Vinocur joked that he was there to take lunch orders, but actually sing backing vocals. Stern responded, "Look at you, Avi, hangin' with Metallica, singing backing vocals! Don't fuck up." After the song, Stern quipped "Boy is that beautiful, boys. Metallica featuring Avi. The good news is Avi can sing. The bad news is, the band's lunch is ready and he's got to go pick it up."

In September 2021, Blackened Recordings released Goodnight, Texas' cover of the Metallica song "Of Wolf and Man" as part of The Metallica Blacklist charity tribute album. The song debuted at #1 on Amazon's Country charts, as well as #3 in overall sales of New Releases.

== Discography ==
Albums and EPs
Title	Date of Release
A Long Life of Living	2012
Uncle John Farquhar	2014
An Even Longer Life of Living (EP)	2017
Conductor	2018
The Senseless Age (EP)	2019
Live in Seattle, Just Before The Global Pandemic	2020
How Long Will It Take Them To Die	2022
The Lightning and The Old Man Todd (EP)	2024
Signals	2024
Live in Chicago, Just Before the Pope Was From Chicago	2025

Singles
Title	Date of Release
Keep Movin'	2018
Tennessee	2019
A Pair	2020
Hypothermic	2020
Don't Let 'Em Get You	2020
Of Wolf and Man	2021
Dead Middle	2021
Borrowed Time	2021
To Hurry Things Along	February 10, 2023
Runaways	September 21, 2023
