= Briscoe County, Texas =

County in Texas, United States

- County
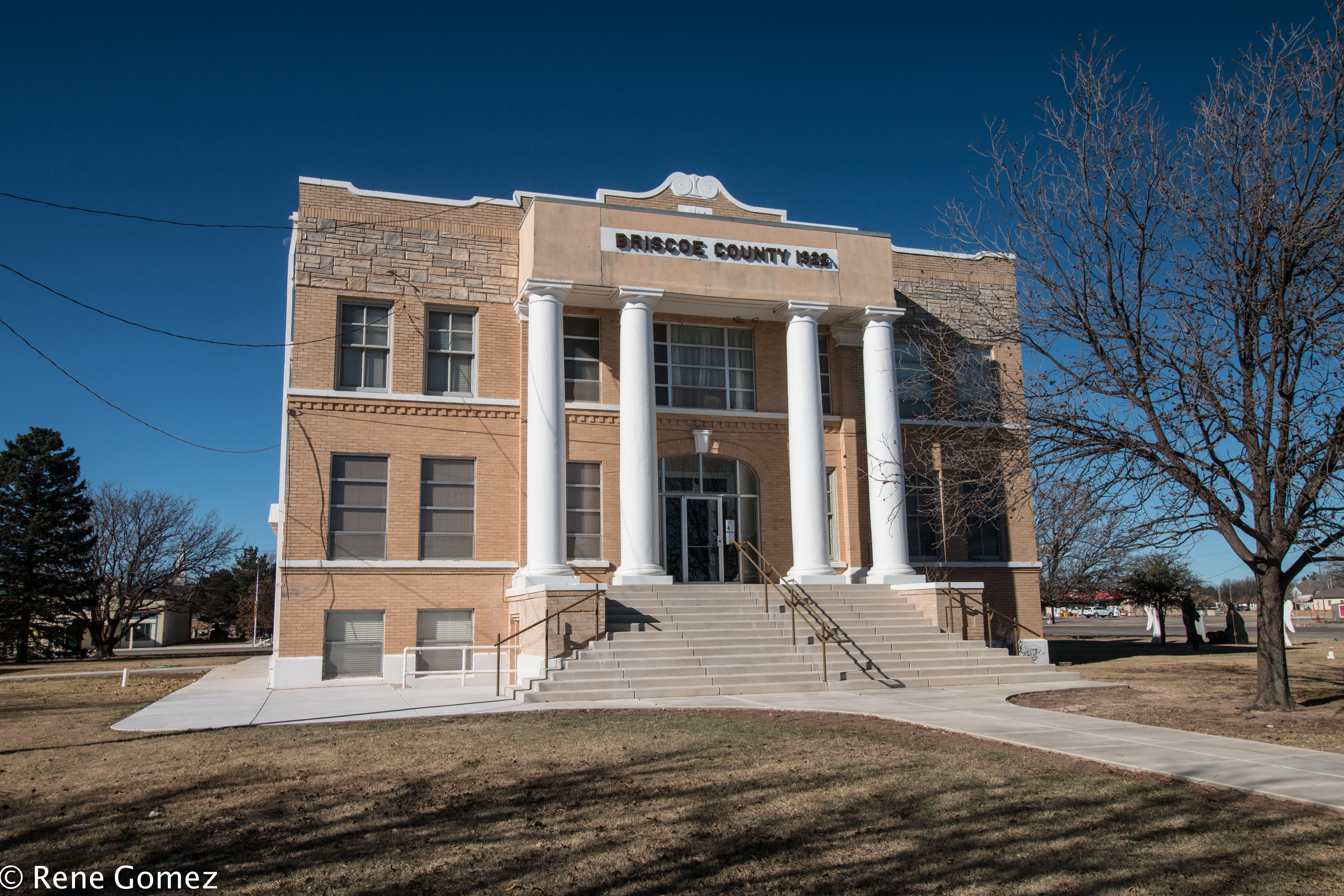
- The Briscoe County Courthouse in Silverton

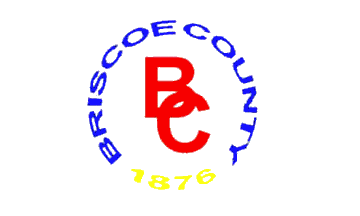
- Flag

- Location within the U.S. state of Texas
- Coordinates: 34°32′N 101°13′W
- Country: United States
- State: Texas
- Founded: 1892
- Named for: Andrew Briscoe
- Seat: Silverton
- Largest city: Silverton

Area
  - Total: 902 sq mi (2,340 km^{2})
  - Land: 900 sq mi (2,300 km^{2})
  - Water: 1.6 sq mi (4.1 km^{2}) 0.2%

Population (2020)
  - Total: 1,435
  - Estimate (2025): 1,474 ▲
  - Density: 1.6/sq mi (0.62/km^{2})
- Time zone: UTC−6 (Central)
  - Summer (DST): UTC−5 (CDT)
- Congressional district: 13th
- Website: www.co.briscoe.tx.us

Briscoe County is a county located in the U.S. state of Texas. As of the 2020 census, the population was 1,435. Its county seat is Silverton. The county was created in 1876 and later organized in 1892. It is named for Andrew Briscoe, a soldier during the Texas Revolution.

At one time, the large JA Ranch, founded by Charles Goodnight and John George Adair, reached into Briscoe County. After he left the JA, Goodnight owned the Quitaque Ranch. The prominent high school football and college coach Gene Mayfield was born in Briscoe County in 1928.

Caprock Canyons State Park and Trailway is located in Briscoe County.

== Geography ==
According to the U.S. Census Bureau, the county has a total area of 902 square miles (2,340 km^{2}), of which 900 square miles (2,300 km^{2}) is land and 1.6 square miles (4.1 km^{2}), or 0.2%, is water.

=== Tule Canyon ===
Mackenzie Reservoir formed after water on Tule Creek was impounded. In 1972 the project was begun, just east of the site of the slaughter of the Indian ponies by Col. Ranald S. Mackenzie's Fourth Cavalry in 1874.

=== Major highways ===
- State Highway 70
- State Highway 86
- State Highway 207
- State Highway 256

=== Adjacent counties ===
- Armstrong County (north)
- Donley County (northeast)
- Hall County (east)
- Motley County (southeast)
- Floyd County (south)
- Swisher County (west)

== Demographics ==
Historical population
Census	Pop.	Note	%±
1880	12		—
1900	1,253		—
1910	2,162		72.5%
1920	2,948		36.4%
1930	5,590		89.6%
1940	4,056		−27.4%
1950	3,528		−13.0%
1960	3,577		1.4%
1970	2,794		−21.9%
1980	2,579		−7.7%
1990	1,971		−23.6%
2000	1,790		−9.2%
2010	1,637		−8.5%
2020	1,435		−12.3%
2025 (est.)	1,474	▲	2.7%
U.S. Decennial Census; 1850–2010 2010 2020

=== 2020 census ===
As of the 2020 census, the county had a population of 1,435. The median age was 46.7 years. 22.4% of residents were under the age of 18 and 27.6% of residents were 65 years of age or older. For every 100 females there were 106.5 males, and for every 100 females age 18 and over there were 102.4 males age 18 and over.

The racial makeup of the county was 81.9% White, 1.3% Black or African American, 0.5% American Indian and Alaska Native, <0.1% Asian, <0.1% Native Hawaiian and Pacific Islander, 9.8% from some other race, and 6.6% from two or more races. Hispanic or Latino residents of any race comprised 25.6% of the population.

<0.1% of residents lived in urban areas, while 100.0% lived in rural areas.

There were 605 households in the county, of which 29.8% had children under the age of 18 living in them. Of all households, 55.9% were married-couple households, 19.5% were households with a male householder and no spouse or partner present, and 20.3% were households with a female householder and no spouse or partner present. About 26.8% of all households were made up of individuals and 17.8% had someone living alone who was 65 years of age or older.

There were 874 housing units, of which 30.8% were vacant. Among occupied housing units, 80.2% were owner-occupied and 19.8% were renter-occupied. The homeowner vacancy rate was 3.6% and the rental vacancy rate was 21.5%.

=== Racial and ethnic composition ===
Briscoe County, Texas – Racial and ethnic composition Note: the US Census treats Hispanic/Latino as an ethnic category. This table excludes Latinos from the racial categories and assigns them to a separate category. Hispanics/Latinos may be of any race.
Race / Ethnicity (NH = Non-Hispanic)	Pop 2000	Pop 2010	Pop 2020	% 2000	% 2010	% 2020
White alone (NH)	1,319	1,163	1,008	73.69%	71.04%	70.24%
Black or African American alone (NH)	40	40	17	2.23%	2.44%	1.18%
Native American or Alaska Native alone (NH)	4	2	4	0.22%	0.12%	0.28%
Asian alone (NH)	1	0	0	0.06%	0.00%	0.00%
Pacific Islander alone (NH)	0	0	0	0.00%	0.00%	0.00%
Other Race alone (NH)	0	0	3	0.00%	0.00%	0.21%
Mixed Race or Multiracial (NH)	19	21	35	1.06%	1.28%	2.44%
Hispanic or Latino (any race)	407	411	368	22.74%	25.11%	25.64%
Total	1,790	1,637	1,435	100.00%	100.00%	100.00%

=== 2000 census ===
As of the census of 2000, there were 1,790 people, 724 households, and 511 families residing in the county. The population density was 2 people per square mile (0.77 people/km^{2}). There were 1,006 housing units at an average density of 1 units per square mile (0.39/km^{2}). The racial makeup of the county was 83.35% White, 2.29% Black or African American, 0.39% Native American, 0.06% Asian, 11.45% from other races, and 2.46% from two or more races. 22.74% of the population were Hispanic or Latino of any race.

There were 724 households, out of which 29.30% had children under the age of 18 living with them, 59.30% were married couples living together, 7.60% had a female householder with no husband present, and 29.40% were non-families. 27.90% of all households were made up of individuals, and 16.00% had someone living alone who was 65 years of age or older. The average household size was 2.47 and the average family size was 3.03.

In the county, the population was spread out, with 27.10% under the age of 18, 6.80% from 18 to 24, 22.00% from 25 to 44, 24.80% from 45 to 64, and 19.30% who were 65 years of age or older. The median age was 40 years. For every 100 females there were 95.00 males. For every 100 females age 18 and over, there were 92.80 males.

The median income for a household in the county was $29,917, and the median income for a family was $35,326. Males had a median income of $25,854 versus $17,500 for females. The per capita income for the county was $14,218. About 11.50% of families and 16.00% of the population were below the poverty line, including 23.00% of those under age 18 and 12.50% of those age 65 or over.

== Education ==
School districts include:

- Silverton Independent School District
- Clarendon Independent School District (partial)
- Turkey-Quitaque Independent School District (partial)

Briscoe County is in the service area of Clarendon College.

== Communities ==
- Quitaque
- Silverton (county seat)

== Politics ==
Briscoe County is located within District 88 of the Texas House of Representatives. Briscoe County is located within District 31 of the Texas Senate.

United States presidential election results for Briscoe County, Texas
Year	Republican		Democratic		Third party(ies)	
Year	No.	%	No.	%	No.	%
1912	2	1.29%	148	95.48%	5	3.23%
1916	4	1.40%	260	90.91%	22	7.69%
1920	39	11.75%	262	78.92%	31	9.34%
1924	53	11.13%	397	83.40%	26	5.46%
1928	301	46.96%	336	52.42%	4	0.62%
1932	42	4.11%	977	95.50%	4	0.39%
1936	64	7.01%	849	92.99%	0	0.00%
1940	154	14.45%	910	85.37%	2	0.19%
1944	80	9.66%	615	74.28%	133	16.06%
1948	83	10.29%	692	85.75%	32	3.97%
1952	692	57.52%	508	42.23%	3	0.25%
1956	357	35.42%	648	64.29%	3	0.30%
1960	533	47.93%	570	51.26%	9	0.81%
1964	348	26.42%	966	73.35%	3	0.23%
1968	411	35.49%	528	45.60%	219	18.91%
1972	642	64.20%	349	34.90%	9	0.90%
1976	285	25.47%	823	73.55%	11	0.98%
1980	562	48.87%	561	48.78%	27	2.35%
1984	538	52.90%	471	46.31%	8	0.79%
1988	464	44.27%	574	54.77%	10	0.95%
1992	360	37.62%	430	44.93%	167	17.45%
1996	416	46.64%	408	45.74%	68	7.62%
2000	544	70.47%	224	29.02%	4	0.52%
2004	620	76.45%	191	23.55%	0	0.00%
2008	617	74.34%	205	24.70%	8	0.96%
2012	578	82.34%	117	16.67%	7	1.00%
2016	625	84.92%	91	12.36%	20	2.72%
2020	639	88.14%	78	10.76%	8	1.10%
2024	666	89.40%	72	9.66%	7	0.94%

United States Senate election results for Briscoe County, Texas1
Year	Republican		Democratic		Third party(ies)	
Year	No.	%	No.	%	No.	%
2024	649	87.23%	79	10.62%	16	2.15%

United States Senate election results for Briscoe County, Texas2
Year	Republican		Democratic		Third party(ies)	
Year	No.	%	No.	%	No.	%
2020	625	87.41%	79	11.05%	11	1.54%

Texas Gubernatorial election results for Briscoe County
Year	Republican		Democratic		Third party(ies)	
Year	No.	%	No.	%	No.	%
2022	539	91.05%	49	8.28%	4	0.68%

== See also ==
- List of museums in the Texas Panhandle
- National Register of Historic Places listings in Briscoe County, Texas
- Recorded Texas Historic Landmarks in Briscoe County
- Llano Estacado
- Duffy's Peak
- Caprock Canyons State Park and Trailway
- Palo Duro Canyon
- Yellow House Canyon
