= Amarillo Museum of Art =

Art museum in Amarillo, Texas

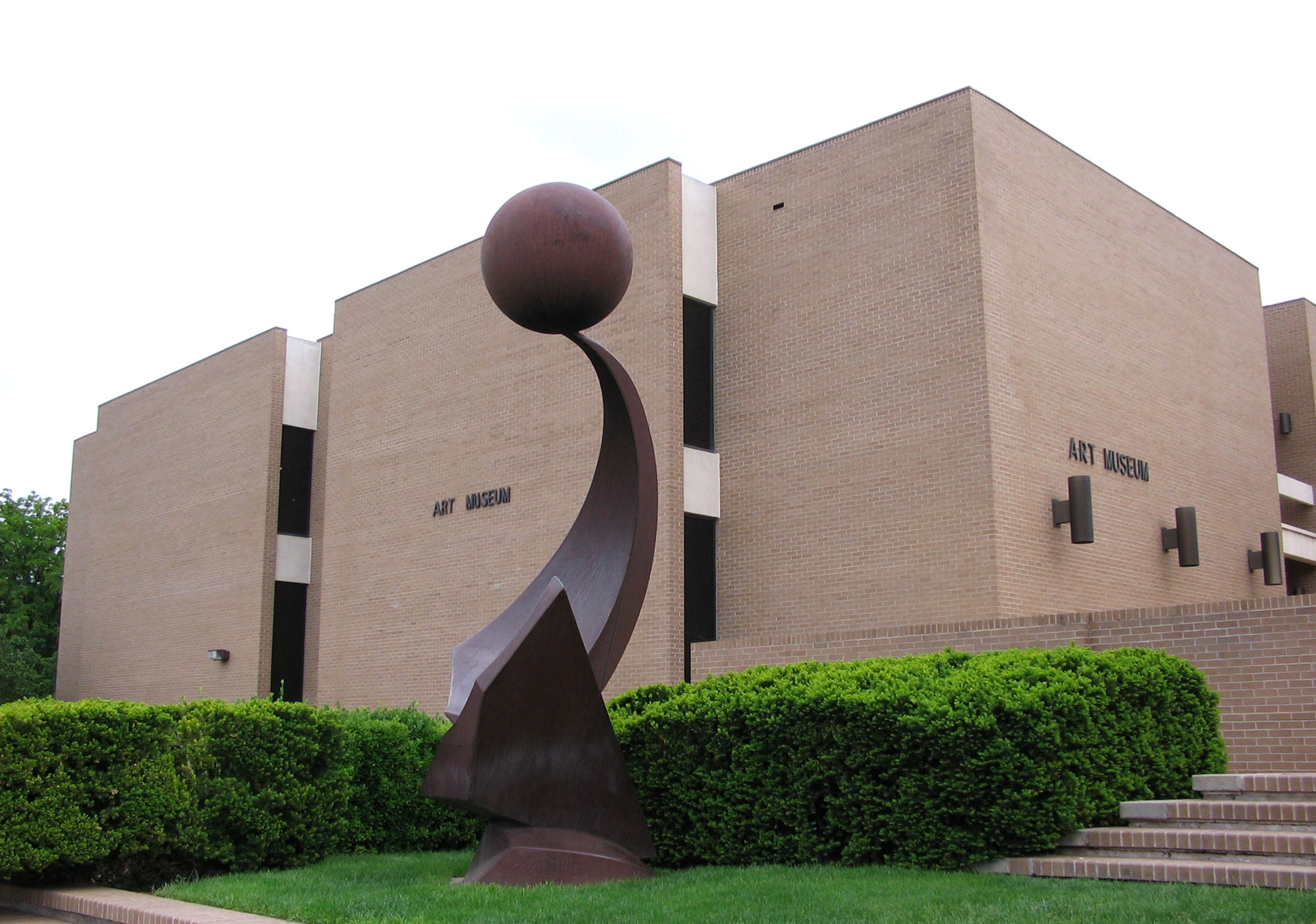

- Location within Texas
- Established: 1972
- Location: 2200 S. Van Buren Street; Amarillo, Texas
- Coordinates: 35.18922°N 101.844631°W
- Type: Visual arts
- Parking: East of the museum, on S. Van Buren Street
- Website: Amarillo Museum of Art

The Amarillo Museum of Art is located at 2200 S. Van Buren Street on the grounds of Amarillo College in the city of Amarillo, in the county of Potter, in the U.S. state of Texas.

== Museum ==
Designed by architect Edward Durell Stone, the Amarillo Museum of Art opened in 1972 on the grounds of Amarillo College. It is also known as the Amarillo Art Center and the Amarillo Art Museum. The 32,000 square feet (3,000 m^{2}) structure is owned by Amarillo College. While the college pays the salary of the director, additional funding comes from the Texas Arts Commission and various grants. An endowment fund was established by Betty Bivins Childers to bring the museum to fruition, and the facilities were dedicated to her when opened.

In 2010, the Texas Commission for the Arts provided a $1,500 grant for the museum's Art Smart and Art for All program for residents of retirement and care facilities.

The museum features a wide variety of visual indoor art. Special days include live music and refreshments. The Price Gallery of Asian Art is a permanent collection of over 300 artifacts collected and donated by Dr. and Mrs. William T. Price of Amarillo. An outdoor sculpture collection is provided on the museum's grounds.

The museum is a member of the Texas Association of Museums.

== Hours, admission, parking ==
Free to the public. Parking is east of the museum on S. Van Buren Street.

Hours: Tuesday through Friday, 10 a.m. to 5 p.m., Saturday and Sunday, 1–4 p.m.

== See also ==
- List of museums in the Texas Panhandle
