= Silverton, Missouri =

Extinct hamlet in Missouri, U.S.

Coordinates: 36°49′02″N 92°33′56″W

Silverton is an historic town in Douglas County, Missouri, United States. The GNIS classifies it as a populated place. It was located along County Road 317 on Spring Creek, 1.7 miles (2.7 km) north-northeast of Wasola and 1.9 miles (3.1 km) west of the Hilo Cemetery, along Route N on Hilo Ridge. Although Hilo is listed as a variant name, the two were not at the same location.

A post office called Silverton was established in 1889, and remained in operation until 1933.
