= Silverton Independent School District =

School district in Texas

Address
- 700 Loretta St Silverton, Texas, 79257-0608; United States
- Coordinates: 34.4708°N 101.3084°W

District information
- Type: Public
- Motto: Home of Excellence
- Grades: PK–12
- Established: 1911; 115 years ago
- NCES District ID: 4840290

Students and staff
- Enrollment: 223
- Staff: 18.78 (on an FTE basis)
- Student–teacher ratio: 11.87
- District mascot: Owls
- Colors: Red & White

Other information
- Website: silvertonisd.net

Silverton Independent School District is a public school district based in Silverton, Texas (USA).

In 2009, the school district was rated "exemplary" by the Texas Education Agency.

== Silverton School ==
=== History ===
By 1937, most of the rural schools in what is now the Silverton Independent School District area of Briscoe County had transferred their high school students into Silverton High School. The enrollment soared. A.L. (Bud) Kelsey was Superintendent and W.E. Sherman was High School Principal. Superintendents of the District between 1939 and 1950 included Paul S. Rogers, F.M. McCarthy, and M.F. Talley. M.G. Moreland became Superintendent in 1950 and served until his retirement in 1960. J.S. Hinds was Superintendent from 1960 to 1970. O.C. Rampley became Superintendent in 1970. David Cavitt became Superintendent in 1987 after Mr. Rampley's retirement. Cavitt filled the position until 1992 when Frank Kirchoffner was hired. Mr. Kirchoffner was Superintendent until 2002, and Bill Mayfield was hired as Interim Superintendent until current Superintendent Jerry Birdsong was hired in the Fall of 2004.

High School Principals between 1939 and 1953 included W.E. Sherman, Aulton Durham, Mrs. Ben O'King, Frank Porter, and A.D. Gay. M.J. Schofield was Principal from 1953 to 1955. O.C. Rampley became Principal in 1955 until 1970, when he became Superintendent.

The present high school building was built in 1929 after the old building burned. In 1957, the present gymnasium and the original four rooms of the elementary building were constructed. In 1958, the Vocational Agriculture department was added to the west end of the gymnasium. Four elementary classrooms were added to the existing four in 1959. In 1964, the cafeteria was built. This building also includes the home economics department, along with other classrooms. The high school was extensively remodeled in 1970, and a new junior high wing was added to the south side of it. Partitions from the old junior high building were removed to create a football field house and weight room in 1977. A new shop was added to the existing agriculture facilities in 1978. The aging field house was razed in 1996, and a new P.E. gym and athletic field house was built and named in honor of former Superintendent O.C. Rampley.

Many renovations were made in 2006, including entirely replacing the school's lighting systems and HVAC controls, as well as minor renovations in the elementary buildings.

The district has one school that serves students in grades pre-kindergarten through twelve.

The district changed to a four day school week in fall 2021.

== Special programs ==
=== Athletics ===
Silverton High School plays six-man football.

== See also ==
- List of school districts in Texas
