= Silvertone =

Silvertone may refer to:

- Silvertone (brand), consumer electronics and musical instruments by Sears, Roebuck and Company
- The Silvertones, a Jamaican reggae harmony group
- The Silvertones, a Canadian rock band that became The Guess Who
- Silvertone (album), by Chris Isaak, 1985
  - Silvertone, Chris Isaak's first band
- Silvertone Records (disambiguation), the name of three different record labels

== See also ==
- Silver (color)
