= Silverton, Texas =

- City
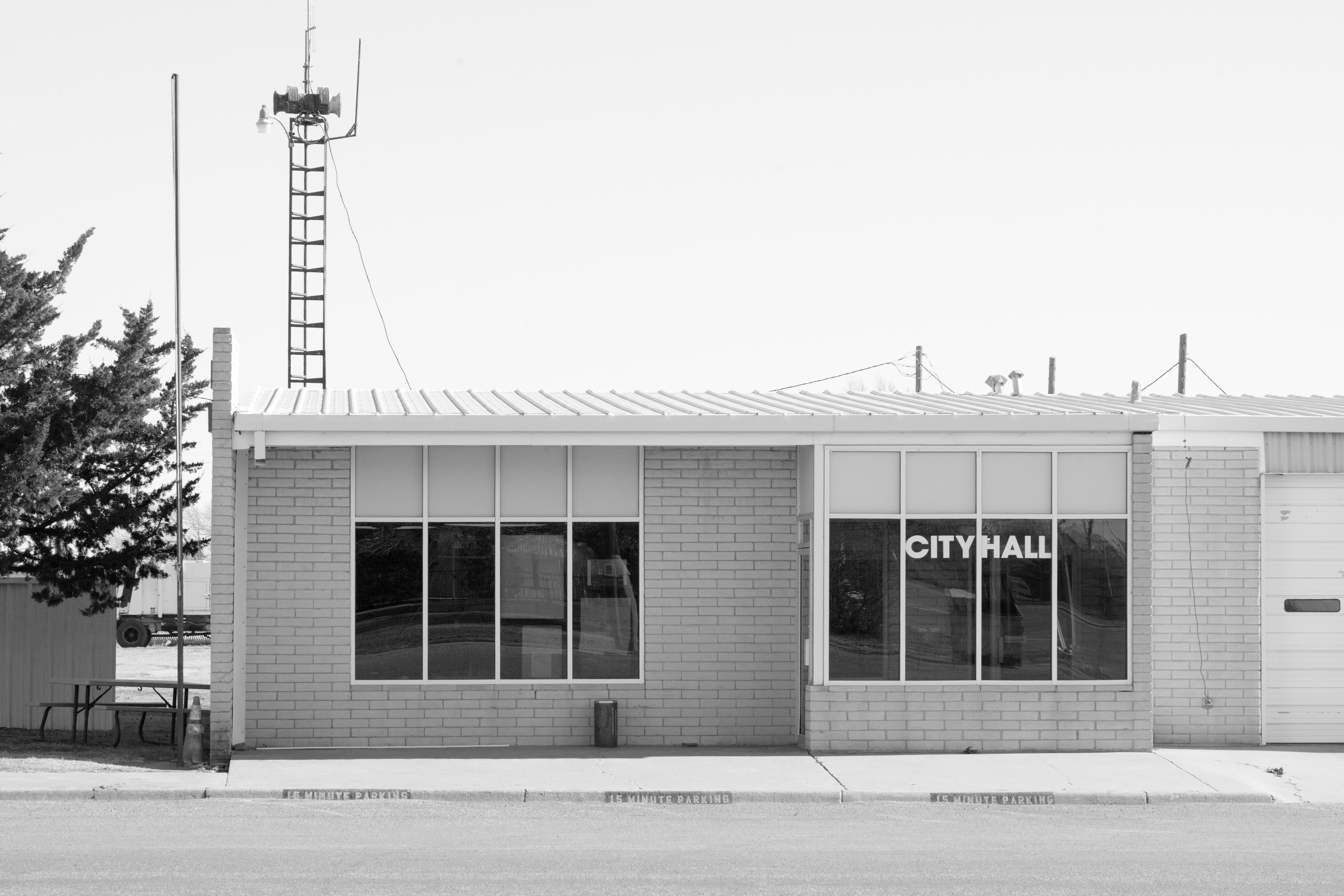
- City Hall (2014)

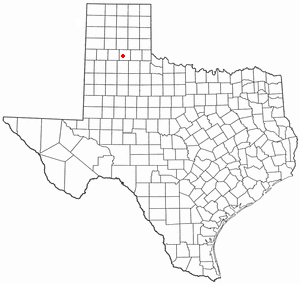
- Location of Silverton, Texas

- Coordinates: 34°28′17″N 101°18′17″W
- Country: United States
- State: Texas
- County: Briscoe

Area
  - Total: 1.00 sq mi (2.60 km^{2})
  - Land: 1.00 sq mi (2.60 km^{2})
  - Water: 0 sq mi (0.00 km^{2})
- Elevation: 3,278 ft (999 m)

Population (2020)
  - Total: 629
  - Density: 626.6/sq mi (241.92/km^{2})
- Time zone: UTC-6 (Central (CST))
  - Summer (DST): UTC-5 (CDT)
- ZIP code: 79257
- Area code: 806
- FIPS code: 48-67904
- GNIS feature ID: 1368288

Silverton is a city in and the county seat of Briscoe County, Texas, United States. The population was 629 at the 2020 census.

== History ==
Silverton was established when Thomas J. Braidfoot and associates formed a townsite company, with the name reportedly derived from the silvery reflections of nearby lakes. The town quickly developed with a post office, stores, a blacksmith shop, and a school by the fall of 1891. In 1892, Silverton won a special election, becoming the county seat over two rival townsites. The construction of a two-story courthouse and a stone jail followed. The town saw the opening of the first bank in 1909 and the construction of a new brick schoolhouse in 1911.

Silverton became the northern terminus of the Fort Worth and Denver South Plains Railway in 1928, leading to its incorporation.

A F4 tornado in 1957 killed twenty-one people and injured 80 others.

== Geography ==
Silverton is located in west-central Briscoe County at 34°28′17″N 101°18′17″W (34.471256, –101.304749). Texas State Highway 86 passes through the city, leading southeast 17 miles (27 km) to Quitaque and west 27 miles (43 km) to Tulia near Interstate 27. Texas State Highway 207 leads south from Silverton 35 miles (56 km) to Floydada and north 52 miles (84 km) to Claude.

According to the United States Census Bureau, Silverton has a total area of 1.0 square mile (2.6 km^{2}), all land. It is the county seat of Briscoe County.

=== Climate ===
According to the Köppen Climate Classification system, Silverton has a semi-arid climate, abbreviated "BSk" on climate maps.

Climate data for Silverton, Texas (1991–2020 normals, extremes 1961–present)
Month	Jan	Feb	Mar	Apr	May	Jun	Jul	Aug	Sep	Oct	Nov	Dec	Year
Record high °F (°C)	80 (27)	89 (32)	94 (34)	102 (39)	107 (42)	111 (44)	110 (43)	108 (42)	103 (39)	100 (38)	88 (31)	84 (29)	111 (44)
Mean maximum °F (°C)	73.5 (23.1)	77.9 (25.5)	85.6 (29.8)	89.5 (31.9)	95.9 (35.5)	100.5 (38.1)	100.7 (38.2)	99.1 (37.3)	96.1 (35.6)	90.5 (32.5)	80.9 (27.2)	74.0 (23.3)	103.5 (39.7)
Mean daily maximum °F (°C)	52.2 (11.2)	56.3 (13.5)	64.7 (18.2)	72.7 (22.6)	80.6 (27.0)	89.0 (31.7)	92.1 (33.4)	90.7 (32.6)	83.5 (28.6)	73.8 (23.2)	62.0 (16.7)	52.6 (11.4)	72.5 (22.5)
Daily mean °F (°C)	37.9 (3.3)	41.5 (5.3)	49.5 (9.7)	57.4 (14.1)	66.8 (19.3)	75.8 (24.3)	79.2 (26.2)	77.9 (25.5)	70.5 (21.4)	59.4 (15.2)	47.7 (8.7)	38.9 (3.8)	58.5 (14.7)
Mean daily minimum °F (°C)	23.7 (−4.6)	26.6 (−3.0)	34.2 (1.2)	42.1 (5.6)	53.0 (11.7)	62.6 (17.0)	66.4 (19.1)	65.1 (18.4)	57.6 (14.2)	45.1 (7.3)	33.5 (0.8)	25.3 (−3.7)	44.6 (7.0)
Mean minimum °F (°C)	9.6 (−12.4)	11.8 (−11.2)	17.8 (−7.9)	27.2 (−2.7)	38.8 (3.8)	53.1 (11.7)	59.5 (15.3)	57.6 (14.2)	44.6 (7.0)	28.5 (−1.9)	16.3 (−8.7)	9.7 (−12.4)	3.9 (−15.6)
Record low °F (°C)	−9 (−23)	−8 (−22)	4 (−16)	19 (−7)	27 (−3)	43 (6)	53 (12)	50 (10)	30 (−1)	15 (−9)	1 (−17)	−10 (−23)	−10 (−23)
Average precipitation inches (mm)	0.69 (18)	0.76 (19)	1.26 (32)	1.64 (42)	2.87 (73)	3.65 (93)	2.42 (61)	2.64 (67)	2.31 (59)	1.82 (46)	0.85 (22)	0.78 (20)	21.69 (551)
Average snowfall inches (cm)	1.9 (4.8)	2.3 (5.8)	1.0 (2.5)	0.3 (0.76)	0.0 (0.0)	0.0 (0.0)	0.0 (0.0)	0.0 (0.0)	0.0 (0.0)	0.1 (0.25)	1.8 (4.6)	1.8 (4.6)	9.2 (23)
Average precipitation days (≥ 0.01 in)	3.0	3.4	4.4	4.3	6.6	7.6	5.8	6.3	5.3	5.0	3.5	3.3	58.5
Average snowy days (≥ 0.1 in)	1.1	1.3	0.5	0.1	0.0	0.0	0.0	0.0	0.0	0.1	0.5	1.0	4.6
Source: NOAA

== Demographics ==
Historical population
Census	Pop.	Note	%±
1920	416		—
1930	873		109.9%
1940	684		−21.6%
1950	857		25.3%
1960	1,098		28.1%
1970	1,026		−6.6%
1980	918		−10.5%
1990	779		−15.1%
2000	771		−1.0%
2010	731		−5.2%
2020	629		−14.0%
U.S. Decennial Census

=== 2020 census ===
As of the 2020 census, there were 629 people, 262 households, and 165 families residing in the city.

The median age was 45.3 years. 21.3% of residents were under the age of 18 and 27.3% of residents were 65 years of age or older. For every 100 females there were 109.0 males, and for every 100 females age 18 and over there were 103.7 males age 18 and over.

There were 262 households in Silverton, of which 34.7% had children under the age of 18 living in them. Of all households, 52.3% were married-couple households, 19.8% were households with a male householder and no spouse or partner present, and 23.3% were households with a female householder and no spouse or partner present. About 25.2% of all households were made up of individuals and 16.8% had someone living alone who was 65 years of age or older.

There were 316 housing units, of which 17.1% were vacant. The homeowner vacancy rate was 3.0% and the rental vacancy rate was 7.0%.

0.0% of residents lived in urban areas, while 100.0% lived in rural areas.

Racial composition as of the 2020 census
Race	Number	Percent
White	491	78.1%
Black or African American	9	1.4%
American Indian and Alaska Native	4	0.6%
Asian	0	0.0%
Native Hawaiian and Other Pacific Islander	0	0.0%
Some other race	87	13.8%
Two or more races	38	6.0%
Hispanic or Latino (of any race)	211	33.5%

Silverton racial composition (NH = Non-Hispanic) (Note: Note: the US Census treats Hispanic/Latino as an ethnic category. This table excludes Latinos from the racial categories and assigns them to a separate category. Hispanics/Latinos can be of any race.)
Race	Number	Percentage
White (NH)	388	61.69%
Black or African American (NH)	9	1.43%
Native American or Alaska Native (NH)	3	0.48%
Some Other Race (NH)	2	0.32%
Mixed/Multi-Racial (NH)	16	2.54%
Hispanic or Latino	211	33.55%
Total	629	

=== 2000 census ===
As of the census of 2000, there were 771 people, 303 households, and 217 families living in the city. The population density was 766.4 inhabitants per square mile (295.9/km^{2}). There were 362 housing units at an average density of 359.8 per square mile (138.9/km^{2}). The racial makeup of the city was 79.51% White, 0.52% African American, 0.78% Native American, 15.69% from other races, and 3.50% from two or more races. Hispanic or Latino of any race were 28.15% of the population.

There were 303 households, out of which 31.7% had children under the age of 18 living with them, 60.7% were married couples living together, 7.6% had a female householder with no husband present, and 28.1% were non-families. 26.4% of all households were made up of individuals, and 16.5% had someone living alone who was 65 years of age or older. The average household size was 2.54 and the average family size was 3.09.

In the city, the population was spread out, with 28.7% under the age of 18, 7.3% from 18 to 24, 22.7% from 25 to 44, 21.1% from 45 to 64, and 20.2% who were 65 years of age or older. The median age was 38 years. For every 100 females, there were 86.7 males. For every 100 females age 18 and over, there were 88.4 males.

The median income for a household in the city was $27,014, and the median income for a family was $32,308. Males had a median income of $23,750 versus $16,750 for females. The per capita income for the city was $13,416. About 12.1% of families and 17.6% of the population were below the poverty line, including 29.4% of those under age 18 and 12.3% of those age 65 or over.

== Education ==
The community of Silverton is served by the Silverton Independent School District and home to the Silverton High School Owls.

Briscoe County is in the service area of Clarendon College.
