= Armstrong County, Texas =

County in Texas, United States

- County
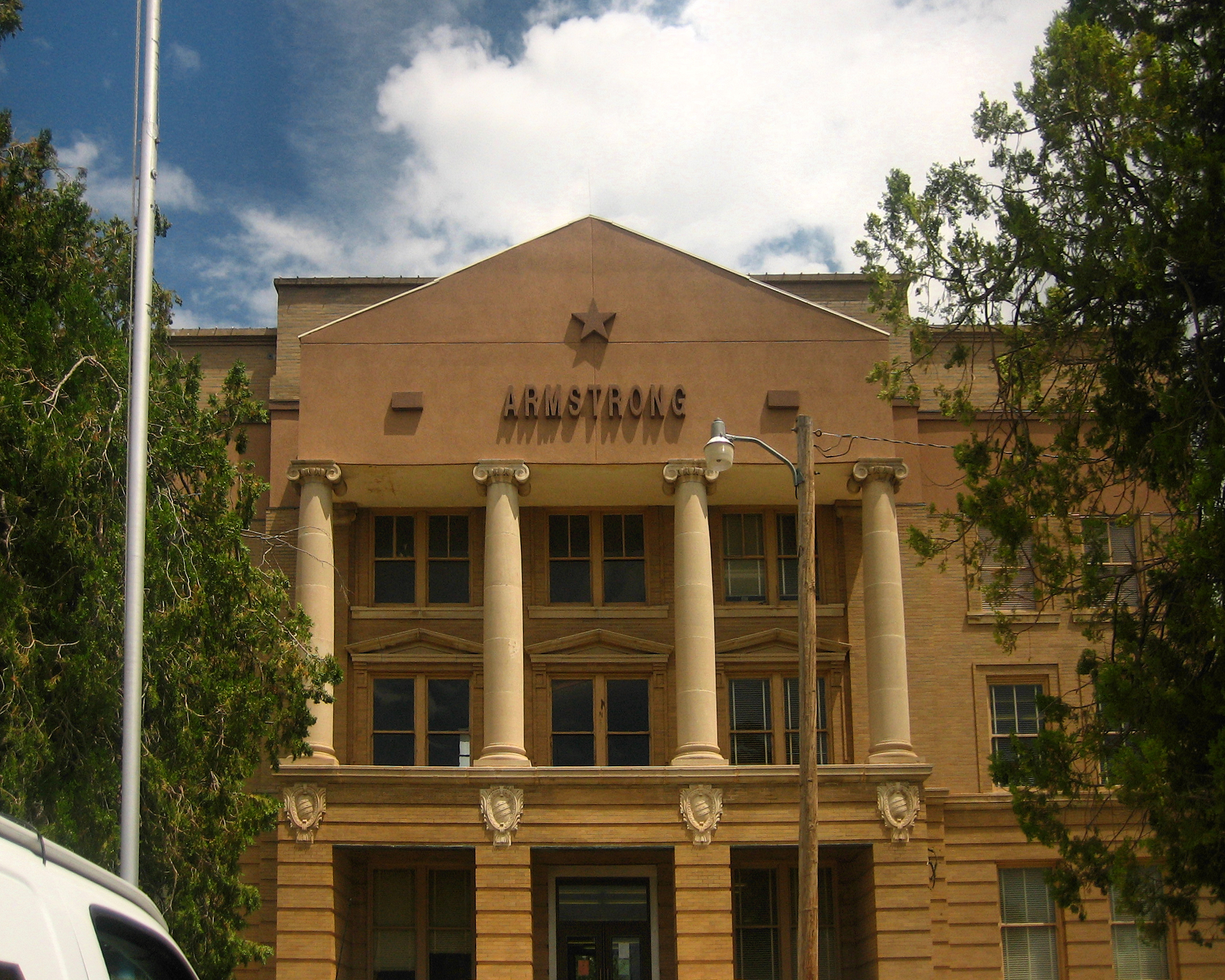
- The Armstrong County Courthouse in Claude

- Location within the U.S. state of Texas
- Coordinates: 34°58′N 101°21′W
- Country: United States
- State: Texas
- Founded: 1890
- Seat: Claude
- Largest city: Claude

Area
  - Total: 914 sq mi (2,370 km^{2})
  - Land: 909 sq mi (2,350 km^{2})
  - Water: 4.7 sq mi (12 km^{2}) 0.5%

Population (2020)
  - Total: 1,848
  - Estimate (2025): 1,843 ▼
  - Density: 2.03/sq mi (0.785/km^{2})
- Time zone: UTC−6 (Central)
  - Summer (DST): UTC−5 (CDT)
- Congressional district: 13th
- Website: www.co.armstrong.tx.us

Armstrong County is a county located in the U.S. state of Texas. As of the 2020 census, the population of Armstrong County was 1,848. It is in the Texas Panhandle and its county seat is Claude. Armstrong County is included in the Amarillo metropolitan area.

The county was formed in 1876 and later organized in 1890. It was named for one of several Texas pioneer families named Armstrong.

== History ==
=== Native Americans ===
Paleo-Indians were the first inhabitants as far back as 10,000 BC. Apachean cultures roamed the county until Comanche dominated around 1700. The Comanches were defeated by the United States Army in the Red River War of 1874. Later tribes include Kiowa and Cheyenne.

=== County established and growth ===
In 1876, the Texas Legislature established Armstrong County from portions of Bexar County, and it organized in 1890 with Claude as the county seat.

In 1876, Charles Goodnight brought a herd of 1,600 cattle into the Palo Duro Canyon, and John George Adair and he established ranching in the county. The JA Ranch encompassed over a million acres (4,000 km^{2}), spread over Armstrong and five adjoining counties. The county land use was primarily ranch-related, even after the trickling in of homesteaders, for the remainder of the 19th century.

In 1887, the JA Ranch split up, giving way to a terminus for the Fort Worth and Denver City Railway. The first town from the ranch was Goodnight. Landowner Robert E. Montgomery platted the town of Washburn, named after railroad executive D.W. Washburn.

The next year, railroad lines turned Washburn into a boom town. In the same year, Armstrong City was renamed Claude in honor of railroad engineer Claude Ayers. In 1890, the two towns competed for the county seat, with Claude winning.

At the beginning of the 20th century, ranching began to share the land with cotton and wheat crops, although ranching remained the leading industry. The Great Depression had a severe effect on the county's economy, and recovery took years. Ranches still occupied about 68% of the land in the county in 2005.

Many scenes of the 1963 Paul Newman film Hud were filmed at Goodnight and Claude.

== Geography ==
According to the U.S. Census Bureau, the county has a total area of 914 square miles (2,370 km^{2}), of which 4.7 sq mi (12 km^{2}) (0.5%) are covered by water.

=== Major highways ===
- U.S. Highway 287
- State Highway 207

=== Adjacent counties ===
- Carson County (north)
- Gray County (northeast)
- Donley County (east)
- Briscoe County (south)
- Swisher County (southwest)
- Randall County (west)
- Potter County (northwest)

== Demographics ==
Historical population
Census	Pop.	Note	%±
1880	31		—
1890	944		2,945.2%
1900	1,205		27.6%
1910	2,682		122.6%
1920	2,816		5.0%
1930	3,329		18.2%
1940	2,495		−25.1%
1950	2,215		−11.2%
1960	1,966		−11.2%
1970	1,895		−3.6%
1980	1,994		5.2%
1990	2,021		1.4%
2000	2,148		6.3%
2010	1,901		−11.5%
2020	1,848		−2.8%
2025 (est.)	1,843	▼	−0.3%
U.S. Decennial Census; 1850–1900 1910; 1920 1930 1940; 1950 1960 1970; 1980 1990 2000; 2010 2020

=== Racial and ethnic composition ===
Armstrong County, Texas – Racial and ethnic composition Note: the US Census treats Hispanic/Latino as an ethnic category. This table excludes Latinos from the racial categories and assigns them to a separate category. Hispanics/Latinos may be of any race.
Race / Ethnicity (NH = Non-Hispanic)	Pop 2000	Pop 2010	Pop 2020	% 2000	% 2010	% 2020
White alone (NH)	2,008	1,725	1,593	93.48%	90.74%	86.20%
Black or African American alone (NH)	4	11	6	0.19%	0.58%	0.32%
Native American or Alaska Native alone (NH)	7	13	17	0.33%	0.68%	0.92%
Asian alone (NH)	0	0	10	0.00%	0.00%	0.54%
Pacific Islander alone (NH)	0	0	0	0.00%	0.00%	0.00%
Other race alone (NH)	1	11	2	0.05%	0.58%	0.11%
Multiracial (NH)	12	17	76	0.56%	0.89%	4.11%
Hispanic or Latino (any race)	116	124	144	5.40%	6.52%	7.79%
Total	2,148	1,901	1,848	100.00%	100.00%	100.00%

=== 2020 census ===
As of the 2020 census, the county had a population of 1,848 and a median age of 43.4 years; 22.8% of residents were under 18 and 21.6% were 65 or older. For every 100 females, there were 96.8 males, and for every 100 females 18 and over, there were 93.4 males 18 and over.

The racial makeup of the county was 89.1% White, 0.7% Black or African American, 0.9% American Indian and Alaska Native, 0.5% Asian, <0.1% Native Hawaiian and Pacific Islander, 2.1% from some other race, and 6.7% from two or more races. Hispanic or Latino residents of any race comprised 7.8% of the population.

About 0.1% of residents lived in urban areas, while almost 100.0% lived in rural areas.

Of the 728 households in the county, 32.8% had children under18 living in them, 59.1% were married-couple households, 15.5% were households with a male householder and no spouse or partner present, and 21.4% were households with a female householder and no spouse or partner present. About 20.4% of all households were made up of individuals, and 11.8% had someone living alone who was 65 years of age or older.

The county had 842 housing units, of which 13.5% were vacant. Among occupied housing units, 80.5% were owner-occupied and 19.5% were renter-occupied. The homeowner vacancy rate was 1.8% and the rental vacancy rate was 10.6%.

=== 2000 census ===
As of the census of 2000, 2,148 people, 802 households, and 612 families resided in the county. The population density was 2 people per square mile (0.77 people/km^{2}). The 920 housing units averaged 1 units per square mile (0.39/km^{2}). The racial makeup of the county was 95.44% White, 0.28% Black or African American, 0.65% Native American, 2.79% from other races, and 0.84% from two or more races. About 5.40% of the population was Hispanic or Latino of any race.

Of the 802 households, 33.9% had children under 18 living with them, 67.2% were married couples living together, 6.1% had a female householder with no husband present, and 23.6% were not families. About 21.4% of all households were made up of individuals, and 12.0% had someone living alone who was 65 or older. The average household size was 2.58 and the average family size was 2.99.

In the county, the population was distributed as 26.0% under 18, 6.1% from 18 to 24, 24.8% from 25 to 44, 23.8% from 45 to 64, and 19.2% who were 65 or older. The median age was 41 years. For every 100 females, there were 93.20 males. For every 100 females 18 and over, there were 90.30 males.

The median income in the county for a household was $38,194 and for a family was $43,894. Males had a median income of $30,114 versus $21,786 for females. The per capita income for the county was $17,151. About 7.9% of families and 10.6% of the population were below the poverty line, including 15.8% of those under 18 and 11.6% of those 65 or over.

== Education ==
The Claude Independent School District serves almost all of Armstrong County.

Three school districts headquartered in surrounding counties, Clarendon Consolidated Independent School District, Groom Independent School District, and Happy Independent School District, include small, unincorporated portions of Armstrong County.

== Communities ==
=== City ===
- Claude (county seat)

=== Census-designated place ===
- Washburn

=== Unincorporated communities ===
- Fairview
- Goodnight
- Malden
- Paloduro
- Wayside

== Government ==
=== Law enforcement ===
The current sheriff of Armstrong County is Melissa Anderson. She is assisted by three full-time deputies. The Armstrong Sheriff's Office no longer operates a county jail, as it was closed in April 2022.

The old Armstrong County Jail, located in Claude, was erected in 1953 with the designs of Lawrence A. Kerr and Clayton B. Shiver. It was built with stone quarried 14 miles to the south of Claude in Palo Duro Canyon that was recycled from the demolition of the former jail built in 1893. The jail housed inmates on the second floor and the first floor formerly served as the home of the sheriff, though it was converted into office space. The jail was also the location of the county's public-safety answering point and dispatch center.

== Politics ==
Armstrong County is located within District 86 of the Texas House of Representatives and District 31 of the Texas Senate.

United States presidential election results for Armstrong County, Texas
Year	Republican		Democratic		Third party(ies)	
Year	No.	%	No.	%	No.	%
1912	32	9.38%	274	80.35%	35	10.26%
1916	43	10.57%	353	86.73%	11	2.70%
1920	87	17.51%	405	81.49%	5	1.01%
1924	106	19.06%	426	76.62%	24	4.32%
1928	316	45.80%	373	54.06%	1	0.14%
1932	63	7.18%	813	92.70%	1	0.11%
1936	33	3.54%	897	96.14%	3	0.32%
1940	82	8.42%	891	91.48%	1	0.10%
1944	132	16.50%	623	77.88%	45	5.63%
1948	97	11.89%	686	84.07%	33	4.04%
1952	562	56.43%	425	42.67%	9	0.90%
1956	372	46.62%	422	52.88%	4	0.50%
1960	488	56.74%	365	42.44%	7	0.81%
1964	365	40.15%	544	59.85%	0	0.00%
1968	434	46.12%	301	31.99%	206	21.89%
1972	768	80.76%	177	18.61%	6	0.63%
1976	506	49.27%	513	49.95%	8	0.78%
1980	709	66.57%	333	31.27%	23	2.16%
1984	791	76.50%	238	23.02%	5	0.48%
1988	720	69.23%	314	30.19%	6	0.58%
1992	561	54.57%	278	27.04%	189	18.39%
1996	582	62.18%	272	29.06%	82	8.76%
2000	772	82.30%	150	15.99%	16	1.71%
2004	830	82.67%	170	16.93%	4	0.40%
2008	856	86.46%	128	12.93%	6	0.61%
2012	828	88.56%	98	10.48%	9	0.96%
2016	924	90.50%	70	6.86%	27	2.64%
2020	1,035	93.08%	75	6.74%	2	0.18%
2024	1,029	92.79%	77	6.94%	3	0.27%

United States Senate election results for Armstrong County, Texas1
Year	Republican		Democratic		Third party(ies)	
Year	No.	%	No.	%	No.	%
2024	1,001	90.02%	97	8.72%	14	1.26%

United States Senate election results for Armstrong County, Texas2
Year	Republican		Democratic		Third party(ies)	
Year	No.	%	No.	%	No.	%
2020	1,025	93.27%	64	5.82%	10	0.91%

Texas Gubernatorial election results for Armstrong County
Year	Republican		Democratic		Third party(ies)	
Year	No.	%	No.	%	No.	%
2022	833	92.25%	60	6.64%	10	1.11%

== See also ==
- List of museums in the Texas Panhandle
- National Register of Historic Places listings in Armstrong County, Texas
- Recorded Texas Historic Landmarks in Armstrong County
