= Goodnight, Texas =

- Unincorporated community
- Location within Texas Location within the United States
- Coordinates: 35°02′04″N 101°11′11″W
- Country: United States
- State: Texas
- County: Armstrong
- Elevation: 3,150 ft (960 m)
- Time zone: UTC-6 (Central (CST))
  - Summer (DST): UTC-5 (CDT)
- Area code: 806
- GNIS feature ID: 1358160

Goodnight is an unincorporated community in Armstrong County, Texas, United States. The community is part of the Amarillo metropolitan statistical area. In 2000, its population was 18.

== History ==
Goodnight was named for pioneer rancher Charles Goodnight.

A folk-rock band called Goodnight, Texas was named after the town of Goodnight, located 1,415 miles (2,277 km) directly between their hometowns of Chapel Hill, North Carolina, and San Francisco, California. The band had performed in town three times as of 2017.

The Charles and Mary Ann (Molly) Goodnight Ranch House is currently listed on the National Register of Historic Places.

== Geography ==
Goodnight is located on U.S. Highway 287 at the edge of the Llano Estacado, 14 mi (23 km) southeast of Claude and 40 mi (64 km) southeast of Amarillo in northeastern Armstrong County.

== Education ==
Goodnight's first school was established in 1891. Goodnight College operated from 1898 through 1917. The school was run in cooperation with the local Baptist church. The community is now served by the Clarendon Independent School District.
