= Claude Independent School District =

Texas school district

Coordinates: 35.1069°N 101.3662°W

Location
- Claude, Texas ESC Region 16 United States

District information
- Type: Public Independent school district
- Grades: Prekindergarten through grade 12
- Superintendent: Jeff Byrd
- Schools: 1 (2022-23)
- NCES District ID: 4814250

Students and staff
- Students: 328 (2022-23)
- Teachers: 31.53 (2022-23) (on a full-time equivalent (FTE) basis)
- Student–teacher ratio: 10.40 (2022-23)
- Colors: Royal Blue, Red

Other information
- Website: Claude ISD

Claude Independent School District is a public school district based in Claude, Texas, United States.

In 2009, the school district was rated "recognized" by the Texas Education Agency.

== Schools ==
The district had students in one school in the 2022-2023 school year (Claude School). For the 2012-2013 school year, the two schools were:

- Claude High School (grades 6-12)
- Claude Elementary (prekindergarten-grade 5) (2005 National Blue Ribbon School).

The Claude Lady Mustangs won the 1951 Class B girl's state basketball championship, the first Class B title recognized by the UIL. The Lady Mustangs went on to win the next two titles, as well (1952 and 1953) and again in 1962.

Claude School was named a National Blue Ribbon School in 2022.
