= Claude, Texas =

- City
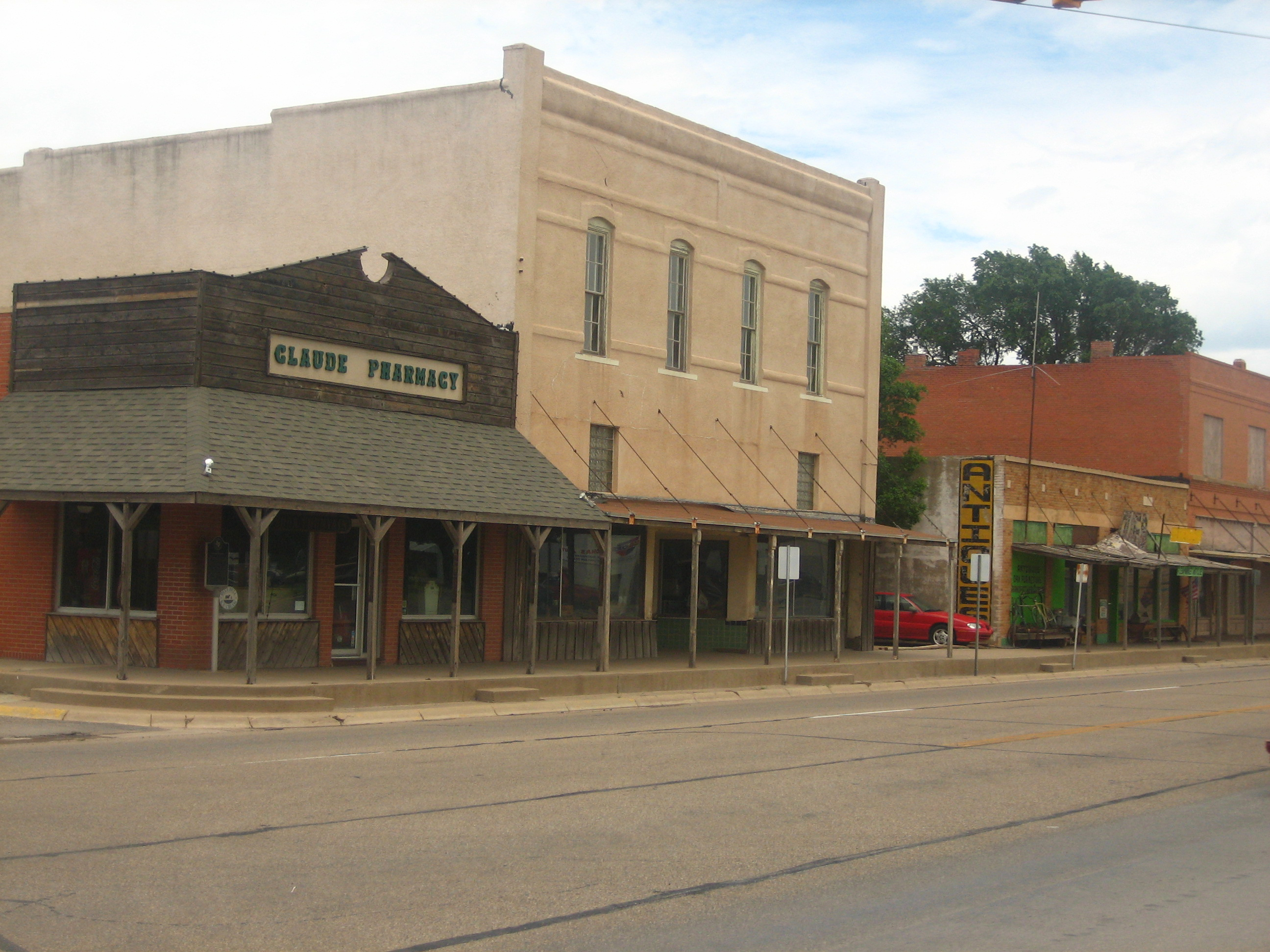
- A view of downtown Claude, Texas, on U.S. Highway 287 with the historic pharmacy building on the left

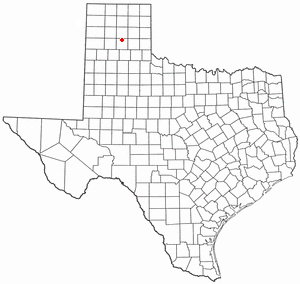
- Location of Claude, Texas

- Coordinates: 35°06′27″N 101°21′46″W
- Country: United States
- State: Texas
- County: Armstrong
- Incorporated: 1900

Area
  - Total: 1.72 sq mi (4.45 km^{2})
  - Land: 1.72 sq mi (4.45 km^{2})
  - Water: 0 sq mi (0.00 km^{2})
- Elevation: 3,402 ft (1,037 m)

Population (2020)
  - Total: 1,186
  - Density: 690/sq mi (267/km^{2})
- Time zone: UTC-6 (Central (CST))
  - Summer (DST): UTC-5 (CDT)
- ZIP code: 79019
- Area code: 806
- FIPS code: 48-15196
- GNIS feature ID: 2409473
- Website: cityofclaude.com

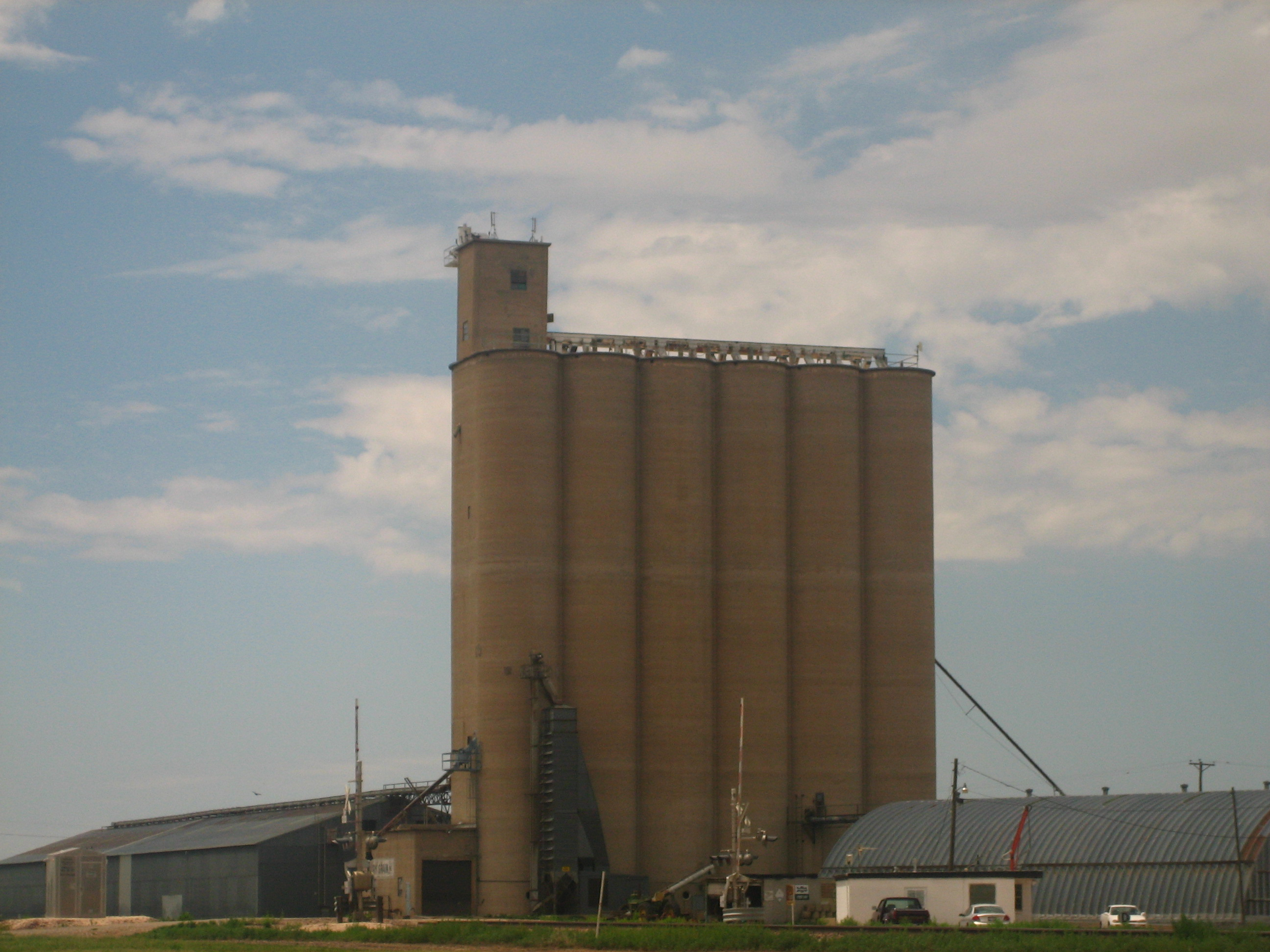
A large grain elevator in Claude, Texas

Claude is a city in and the county seat of Armstrong County, Texas, United States. Its population was 1,186 at the 2020 census. It is located east of Amarillo in the south Texas Panhandle. Claude is part of the Amarillo metropolitan statistical area, but is some 30 miles east of Amarillo.

== History ==
During the first half of the 16th century, Spanish conquistador Francisco Coronado and his party passed through Claude and Tule Canyon, a scenic wonder to the south of Claude off Texas State Highway 207.

Claude was originally named Armstrong City after several area ranches named Armstrong.

The town name became Claude in 1887, named for Claude Ayers. He was the engineer of the first train of the Fort Worth and Denver Railway to travel through the area.

When Armstrong County was formed in 1890, Claude and Washburn competed to be the county seat. The tie-breaking vote for Claude was reportedly cast by legendary cattleman Charles Goodnight, former co-owner of the nearby JA Ranch. The Armstrong County Courthouse in Claude dates to 1912.

W.S. Decker established a weekly newspaper, The Claude Argus, which later merged with the Goodnight News to become The Claude News in 1890.

The Armstrong County Museum has local and Western-themed exhibits. The film Hud, starring Paul Newman and Patricia Neal, was filmed there in 1962.

== Geography ==
Claude is located about 28 mi (45 km) east of Amarillo. According to the United States Census Bureau, the city has a total area of 1.7 sq mi (4.4 km^{2}), all land.

=== Climate ===
According to the Köppen climate classification, Claude has a semiarid climate, BSk on climate maps.

== Demographics ==
Historical population
Census	Pop.	Note	%±
1890	285		—
1910	692		—
1920	770		11.3%
1930	1,041		35.2%
1940	761		−26.9%
1950	820		7.8%
1960	895		9.1%
1970	992		10.8%
1980	1,112		12.1%
1990	1,199		7.8%
2000	1,313		9.5%
2010	1,196		−8.9%
2020	1,186		−0.8%
U.S. Decennial Census

=== 2020 census ===
As of the 2020 census, Claude had a population of 1,186, 447 households, and 369 families.

The median age was 41.8 years; 23.8% of residents were under 18 and 21.5% were 65 or older. For every 100 females, there were 90.1 males, and for every 100 females 18 and over, there were 86.4 males 18 and over.

None of the residents lived in urban areas, while 100.0% lived in rural areas.

Of the 447 households in Claude, 33.6% had children under 18 living in them, 58.2% were married-couple households, 14.1% were households with a male householder and no spouse or partner present, and 23.5% were households with a female householder and no spouse or partner present. About 19.3% of all households were made up of individuals, and 12.3% had someone living alone who was 65 or older.

The city had 501 housing units, of which 10.8% were vacant. Among occupied housing units, 79.0% were owner-occupied and 21.0% were renter-occupied. The homeowner vacancy rate was 2.2% and the rental vacancy rate was 12.0%.

Racial composition as of the 2020 census
Race	Percentage	Number
White	87.9%	1,042
Black or African American	1.1%	13
American Indian and Alaska Native	1.3%	15
Asian	0.6%	7
Some other race	3.0%	35
Two or more races	6.2%	74
Hispanic or Latino (of any race)	9.7%	115

=== 2000 census ===
As of the 2000 census, 1,313 people, 479 households, and 362 families lived in the city. The population density was 766.5 inhabitants per square mile (295.9/km^{2}). The 538 housing units had an average density of 314.1 per square mile (121.3/km^{2}). The racial makeup of the city was 95.96% White, 0.23% African American, 0.46% Native American, 2.89% from other races, and 0.46% from two or more races. Hispanics or Latinos of any race were 5.56% of the population.

Of the 479 households, 34.4% had children under 18 living with them, 66.6% were married couples living together, 6.1% had a female householder with no husband present, and 24.4% were not families. About 22.5% of all households were made up of individuals, and 13.8% had someone living alone who was 65 or older. The average household size was 2.58, and the average family size was 3.01.

In the city, the age distribution was 26.0% under 18, 6.5% from 18 to 24, 24.2% from 25 to 44, 23.0% from 45 to 64, and 20.3% who were 65 or older. The median age was 41 years. For every 100 females, there were 92.2 males. For every 100 females 18 and over, there were 84.3 males.

The median income in the city for a household was $38,641 and for a family was $43,750. Males had a median income of $33,542 versus $21,371 for females. The per capita income for the city was $16,299. About 8.8% of families and 12.5% of the population were below the poverty line, including 19.5% of those under 18 and 17.5% of those 65 or over.

== Film history ==
Several movies have been filmed in and around Claude, including Hud (1963) starring Paul Newman, Leap of Faith (1993) starring Steve Martin, and Sunshine Christmas (1977) starring Cliff DeYoung. Additionally, the closing sunset scene in Indiana Jones and the Last Crusade (1989) was shot in Claude.

== Education ==
The Claude Independent School District serves Claude and is home to the Claude High School Mustangs.

The first school in Claude was built in 1883. In 1907, a three-story building replaced the original building at a cost of $14,000. Unfortunately years later, a fire burned most of this building down. The portion of the building that was restored currently houses the Claude Junior High School.

During the 1930s, Claude had the only official-sized gymnasium in the area. The West Texas State College (now West Texas A&M University) basketball team used it on numerous occasions.

== Notable people ==
- Tom Mechler, Texas state Republican chairman since 2015 and oil and gas consultant in Amarillo, formerly lived in Claude.
- Charles Howard Roan, United States Marine Corps Medal of Honor recipient from the Battle of Peleliu in 1944, was born in Claude.
