= Mulberry Creek (Red River tributary) =

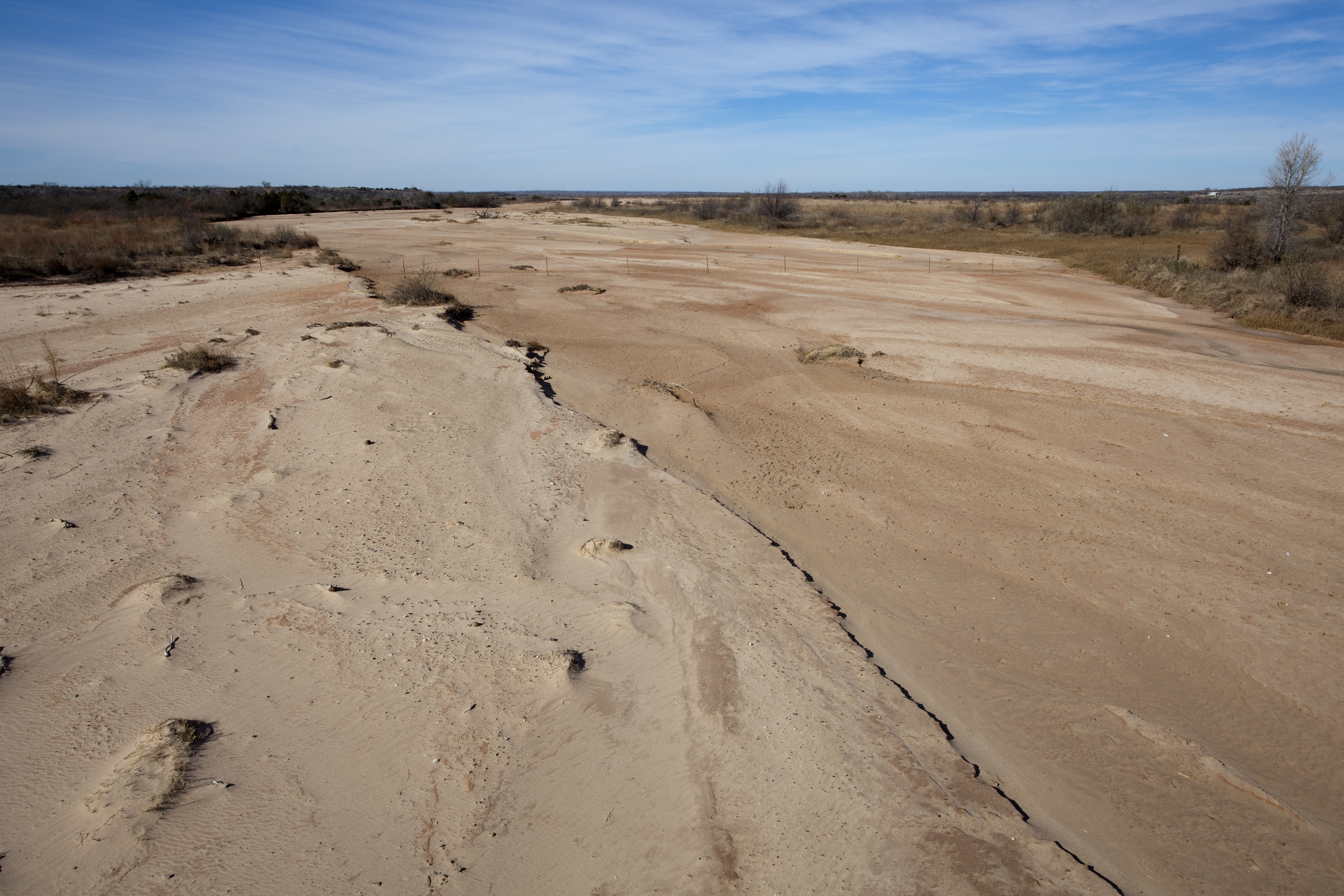
- Sandy bed of Mulberry Creek, Hall County, Texas
- Map of Mulberry Creek

Physical characteristics
- Source
  - location: Armstrong County, Texas
  - coordinates: 35.113941°N 101.523785°W
  - elevation: 3,443 ft (1,049 m)
- Mouth
  - location: Hall County, Texas
  - coordinates: 34.612655°N 100.875232°W
  - elevation: 2,029 ft (618 m)
- Length: 58 mi (93 km)

Basin features
- River system: Red River of the South
- Tributaries
  - left: Big Sandy Creek
  - right: Cottonwood Creek

Mulberry Creek is an intermittent stream about 58 mi (93 km) long, formed as a shallow draw on the high plains of the Llano Estacado in Armstrong County, Texas, and flowing southeastward to join the Prairie Dog Town Fork Red River in Hall County, Texas.

== Geography ==
The upland portion of Mulberry Creek is an ephemeral draw that flows only during heavy rainstorms with significant runoff. Mulberry Creek initially runs southeastward across Armstrong County and drops off the Caprock just south of Claude, Texas. The stream then continues in a southeasterly direction across sparsely populated ranch country of eastern Armstrong and western Hall counties before merging with the Prairie Dog Town Fork Red River.

Overall, Mulberry Creek descends 1,414 ft (431 m) from its headwaters to its confluence with the Prairie Dog Town Fork, passing through flat to moderately steep terrain along its course.

== See also ==
- Salt Fork Red River
- Palo Duro Canyon
- Little Red River (Texas)
- Pease River
- Double Mountain Fork Brazos River
- Quitaque Creek
- List of rivers of Texas
