= North Fork Red River =

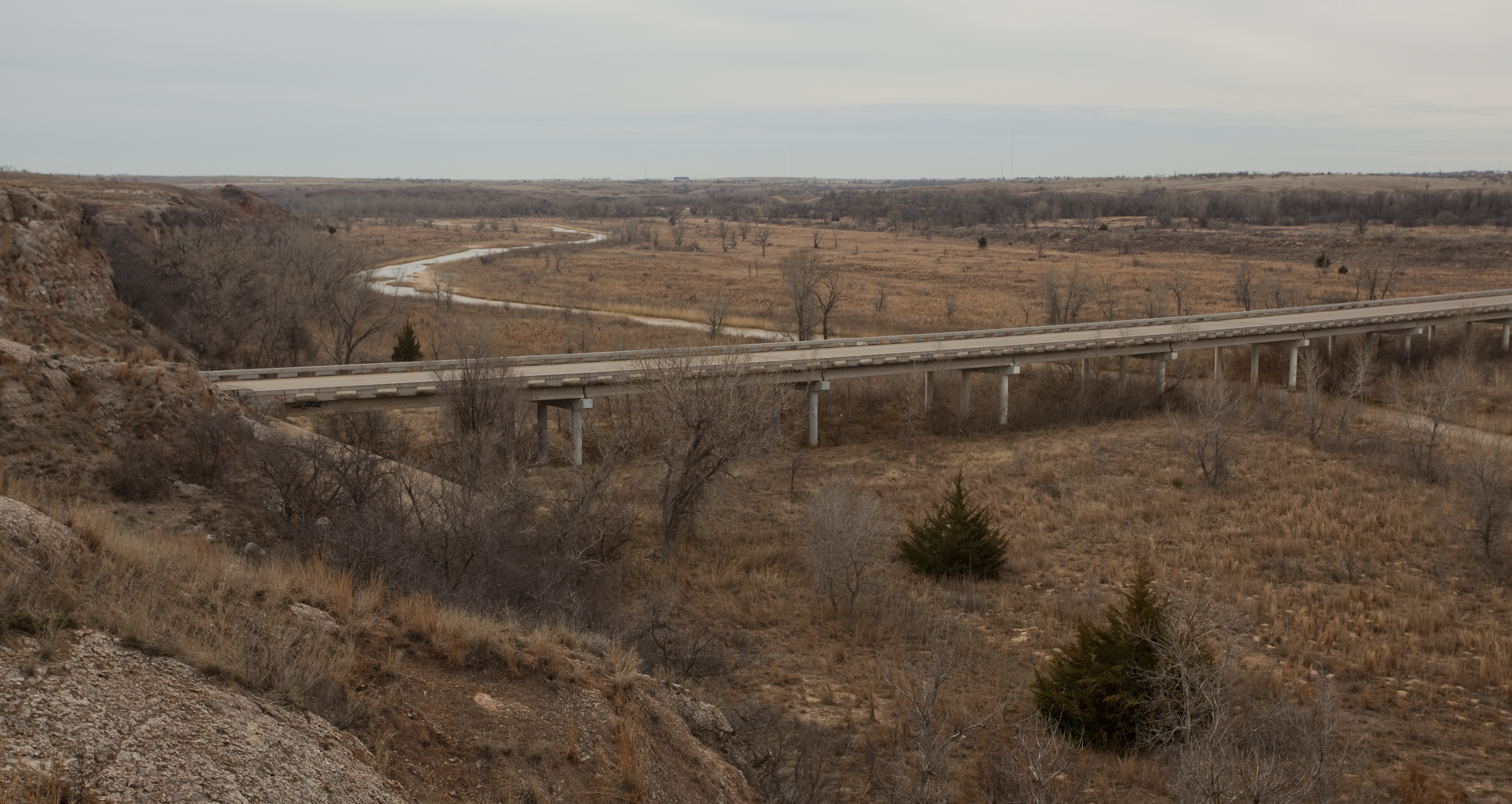
- North Fork Red River in Wheeler County, Texas

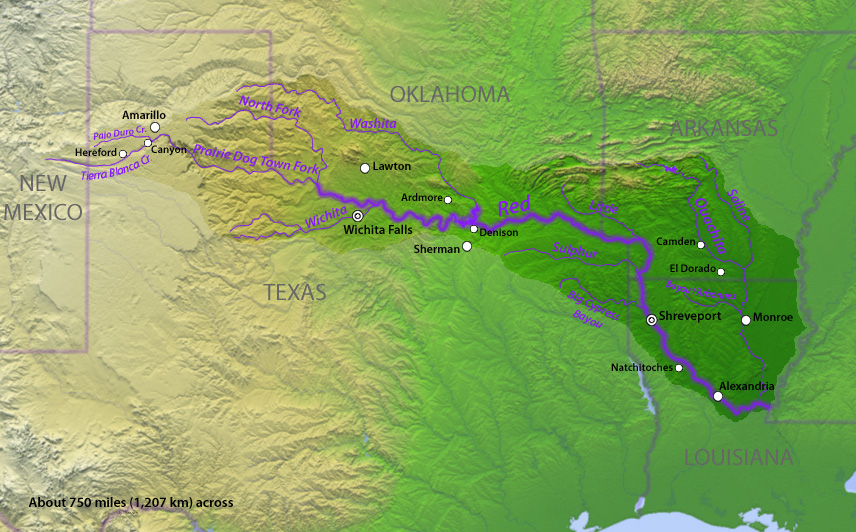
- Map of the Red River watershed

Physical characteristics
- Source
  - location: Gray County, Texas
  - coordinates: 35.4028244°N 101.0795982°W
  - elevation: 3,471 ft (1,058 m)
- Mouth
  - location: Tillman County, Oklahoma
  - coordinates: 34.3167496°N 99.2003587°W
  - elevation: 1,181 ft (360 m)
- Length: 271 mi (436 km)
- Basin size: 5,000 sq mi (13,000 km^{2})
- Discharge
  - location: Tipton
  - average: 531 cu ft/s (15.0 m^{3}/s)

Basin features
- River system: Red River

The North Fork Red River, sometimes called simply the "North Fork", is a tributary of the Red River of the South about 271 mi (436 km) long, heading along the eastern Caprock Escarpment of the Llano Estacado about 11.4 mi (18.3 km) southwest of Pampa, Texas. Rising in Gray County, Texas, it terminates at the confluence with Prairie Dog Town Fork of the Red River at the Texas-Oklahoma border.

== Course ==
From its source in central Gray County, Texas, (Note: Coordinates at 35°24' N, 101°05' W.) the river flows eastward, passing through Wheeler County, Texas, into Oklahoma. Just west of the Wheeler county line, it is joined by McClellan Creek, its chief tributary. In Oklahoma, the stream flows east across Beckham County where it is joined by Sweetwater Creek. It then turns southeast to form the county line between Greer and Kiowa counties, where it is impounded to form Lake Altus-Lugert. In southern Greer County, the North Fork joins Elm Creek before turning in a more southerly direction, forming the border between Kiowa County and Jackson County, Oklahoma and Jackson County, and Tillman counties. It joins the Prairie Dog Town Fork of the Red River at the Texas-Oklahoma border about 12.7 mi (20.4 km) northeast of Vernon, Texas. Overall, the North Fork descends 2,098 ft (639 m) from its headwaters to its confluence with the Red River, passing through mostly rolling to flat terrain with local shallow depressions along its course.

== Historic significance ==
After the Adams-Onis Treaty defined the Red River as the boundary between the United States and New Spain in 1819, the North Fork was considered to be part of the boundary. The Marcy Expedition in 1852 discovered that the main channel of the Red River was actually the South Fork of the Red River, now named Prairie Dog Town Fork of the Red River. The U. S. government thereafter claimed the land between the two Red River streams as far as the 100th Meridian as part of its own territory. After the Republic of Texas joined the United States, Texas still claimed the area, which it named Greer County). A lawsuit brought by Texas against the United States was litigated before the United States Supreme Court, was won by the United States. As a result, Greer County, Texas became a part of Oklahoma Territory and the North Fork ceased to be the Texas boundary.

== Communities ==
- Lefors, TX
- Shamrock, TX
- Sayre, OK
- Hext, OK
- Granite, OK
- Lone Wolf, OK
- Blair, OK
- Tipton, OK
- Headrick, OK

== See also ==
- Adams-Onis Treaty
- List of rivers of Texas
- List of rivers of Oklahoma
- Little Red River
- Pease River
- Prairie Dog Town Fork Red River
- Red River of the South
- Salt Fork Red River
- Washita River
- Wichita River
