= Caprock Canyons State Park and Trailway =

Protected area in Briscoe County, Texas

Caprock Canyons State Park
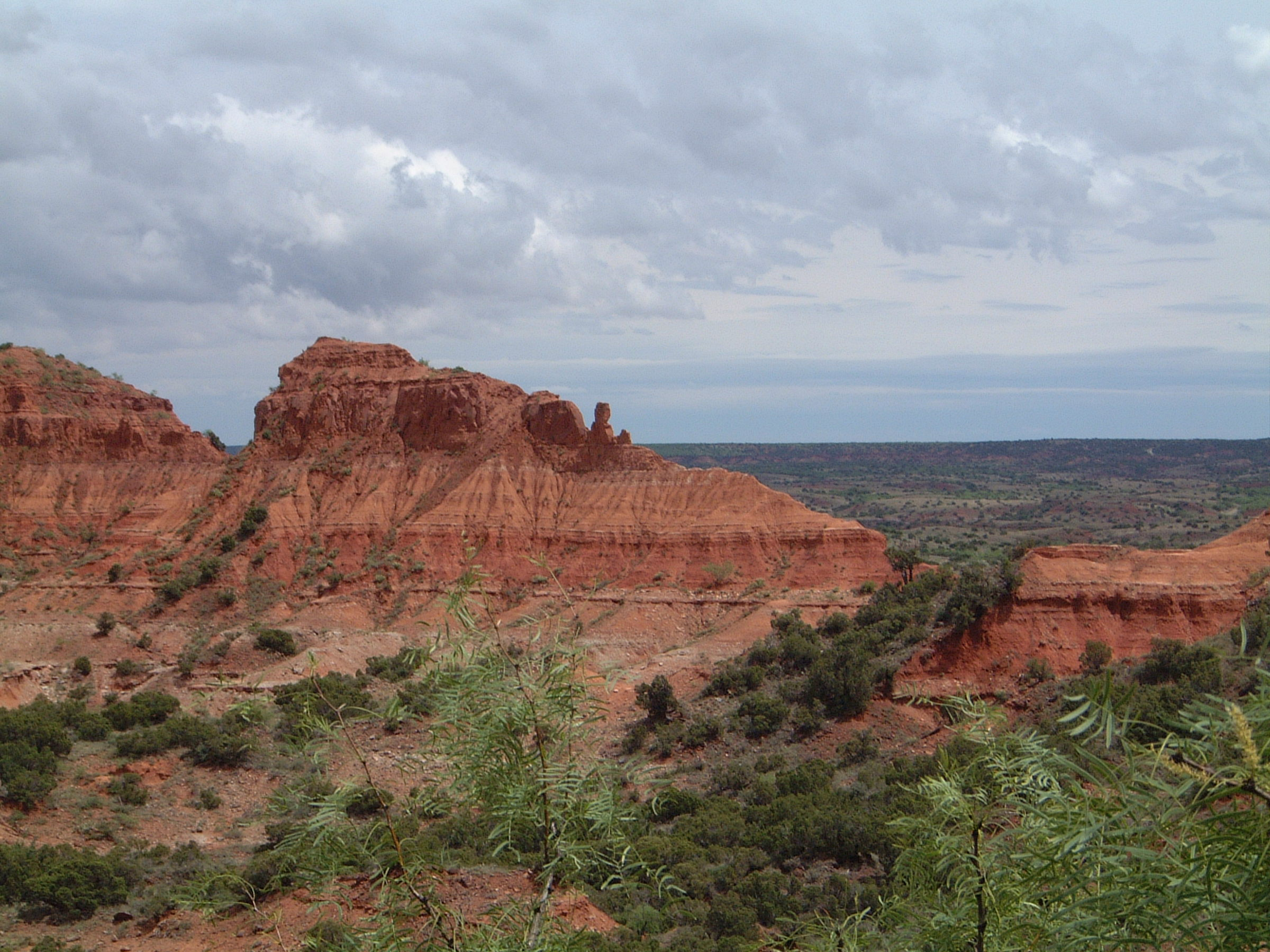
- View from Haynes Ridge
- Location: Briscoe County, Texas
- Nearest city: Quitaque
- Coordinates: 34°26′37″N 101°03′08″W
- Area: 17,500 acres (7,082 ha)
- Established: 1982
- Visitors: 78,505 (in 2025)
- Governing body: Texas Parks and Wildlife Department
- Website: Official site

Caprock Canyons Trailway
- Length: 64 miles (103 kilometres)
- Location: Texas
- Use: Hiking
- Elevation gain/loss: 2,776 ft (846 m)
- Difficulty: Medium

Caprock Canyons State Park and Trailway is a 17,500-acre (7,100 ha) state park located along the eastern edge of the Llano Estacado in Briscoe County, Texas, United States. The park opened in 1982 and is managed by the Texas Parks and Wildlife Department (TPWD).

== History ==
The first human presence in the region dates to over 10,000 years ago with the Folsom tradition, a Paleo-Indian archaeological culture. Traces of the Plainview culture from 9,000 to 8,000 years ago have been found. Evidence of inhabitation during the Archaic period of 8,000 to 1,000 years ago by Pre-Columbian groups include boiling chips for heating food, ground stones for processing seeds, oval knives, and corner-notched or indented dart points.

The Plains Apache were established in the area when Francisco Vázquez de Coronado and other Spanish explorers arrived in the 1500s. The Comanche displaced the Apache in the 1700s and the United States Army removed the Comanche to make way for Texas settlers in the late 1800s. Charles Goodnight began ranching in the area in 1876. In 1882, he bought vast areas of land for John G. Adair and the two established the JA Ranch. Ranching and grazing practices altered much of the natural state of the land. The State of Texas purchased approximately 14,100-acre (5,700 ha), that was at one time part of the ranch, in 1975, and the park opened in 1982. The TPWD has restoration projects to return the land to its natural condition.

In 1993, a 1,217-acre (493 ha) hiking, biking, and equestrian rail trail opened that stretches through the park through Floyd, Briscoe, and Hall Counties. The trailway was created after the TPWD acquired 64.25 miles (103 km) of right-of-way from the abandoned Fort Worth and Denver Railroad's lines between Estelline and South Plains. A unique feature is the 528 ft (161 m) Clarity Railroad Tunnel which is occupied by a colony of Mexican free-tailed bats from late April through mid-October.

In March 2026, the TPWD announced that about 2,200 acres (890 ha) of adjacent land was being added to the park with a 1,066-acre (431 ha) acquisition of land in 2024 and 1,120 acres (450 ha) purchased in January 2026.

== Climate ==
The park is located in West Texas and has a semiarid climate. The average January minimum temperature is 19 °F (−7 °C) and the average July maximum is 91 °F (33 °C). The park receives an average of 20.4 inches (520 mm) of precipitation annually.

== Nature ==
Caprock escarpment and canyon landscape, Briscoe County, Texas. CC0 photograph by the Public Lands Institute.

=== Plants ===
The area contains badlands with honey mesquite, redberry juniper, Great Plains yucca and cacti such as prickly pears and christmas cholla with tall grasses like sideoats grama, blue grama, and san dropseed, Chickasaw plum, netleaf hackberry, Havard oak and eastern cottonwood.

=== Animals ===
At the urging of his wife, Charles Goodnight preserved several plains bison from those that were being slaughtered. This herd became one of the genetic sources from which current bison herds descend. The herd was donated to the State of Texas in 1997. In 2011, bison were allowed to roam throughout the park, and the Texas Legislature designated the bison herd at Caprock Canyons State Park as the official State Bison Herd of Texas. The herd has minimal cattle introgression.

African (Barbary) sheep, mule deer, white-tailed deer, coyote, Virginia opossum, common raccoon, bobcat, gray fox, desert cottontail and North American porcupine, numerous species of rodents, numerous species of snakes and lizards including the venomous western diamond-backed rattlesnake, and over 175 species of birds including golden eagle, red-tailed hawk, greater roadrunner and turkey vulture, are found within the park. 120-acre (49 ha) Lake Theo contains bass, catfish, white crappie and rainbow trout. In the summer of 2012, black-tailed prairie dogs were reintroduced to a 200-acre (81 ha) area within the park.

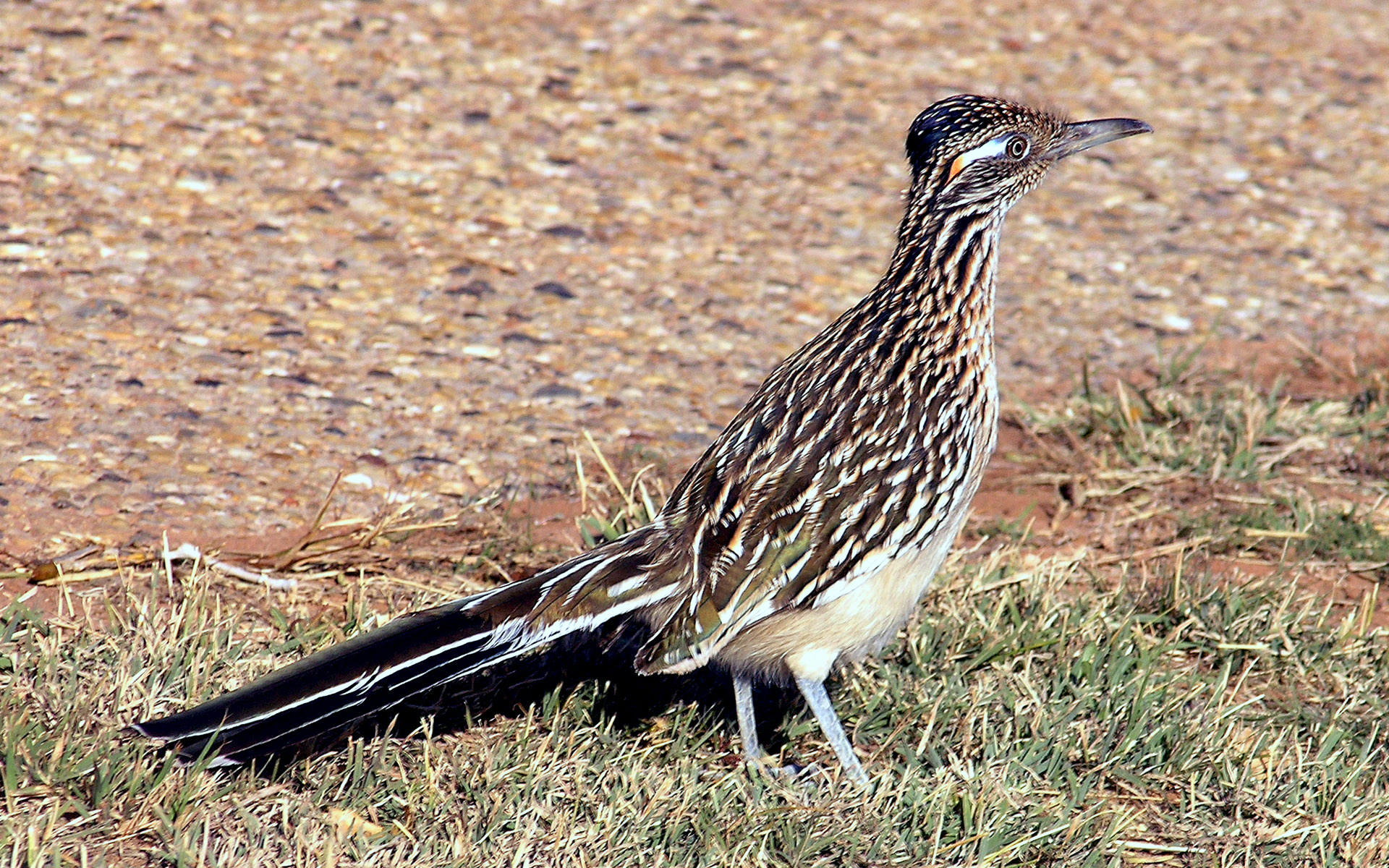
Greater roadrunner (Geococcyx californianus)

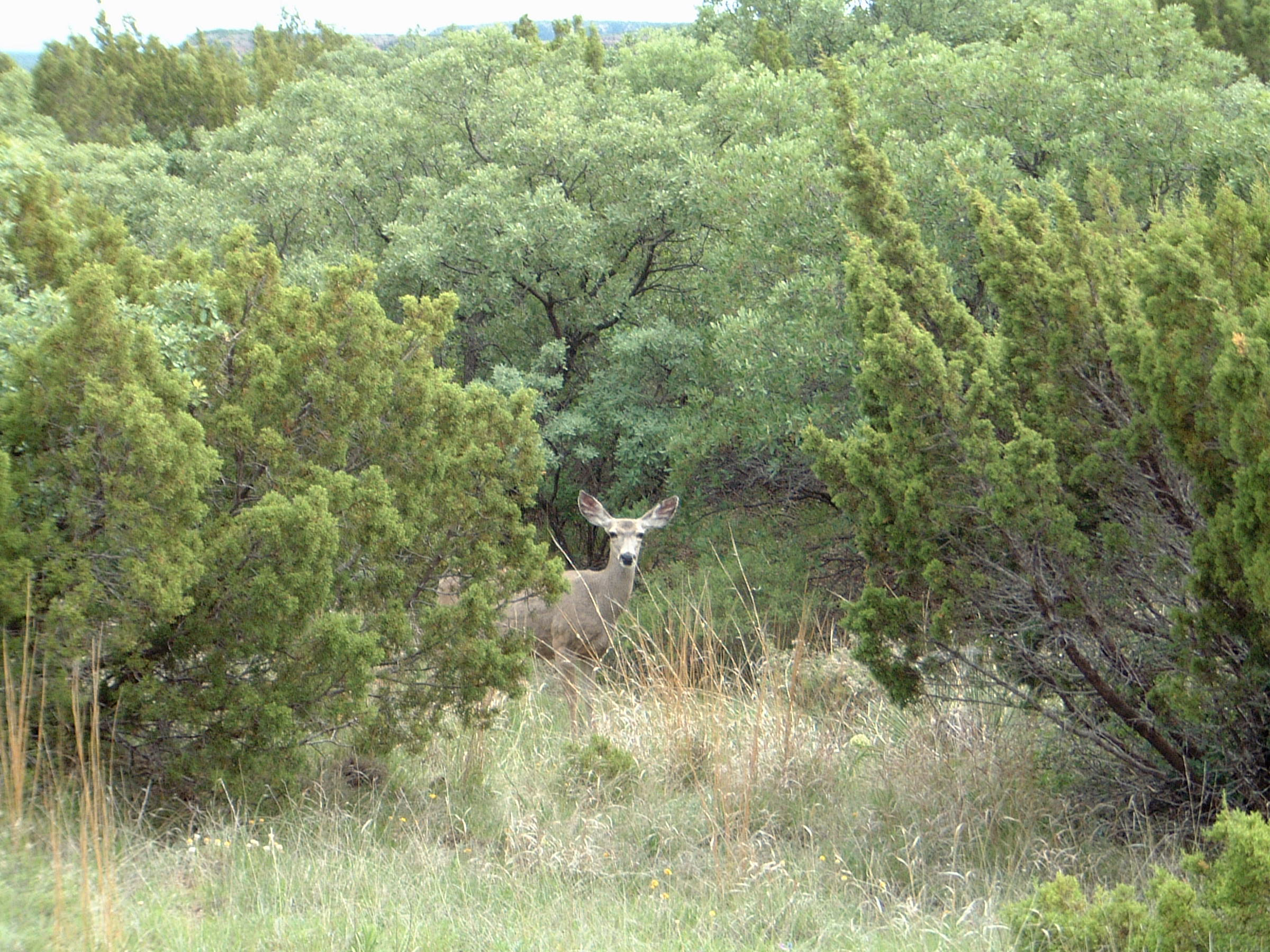
Mule deer (Odocoileus hemionus)

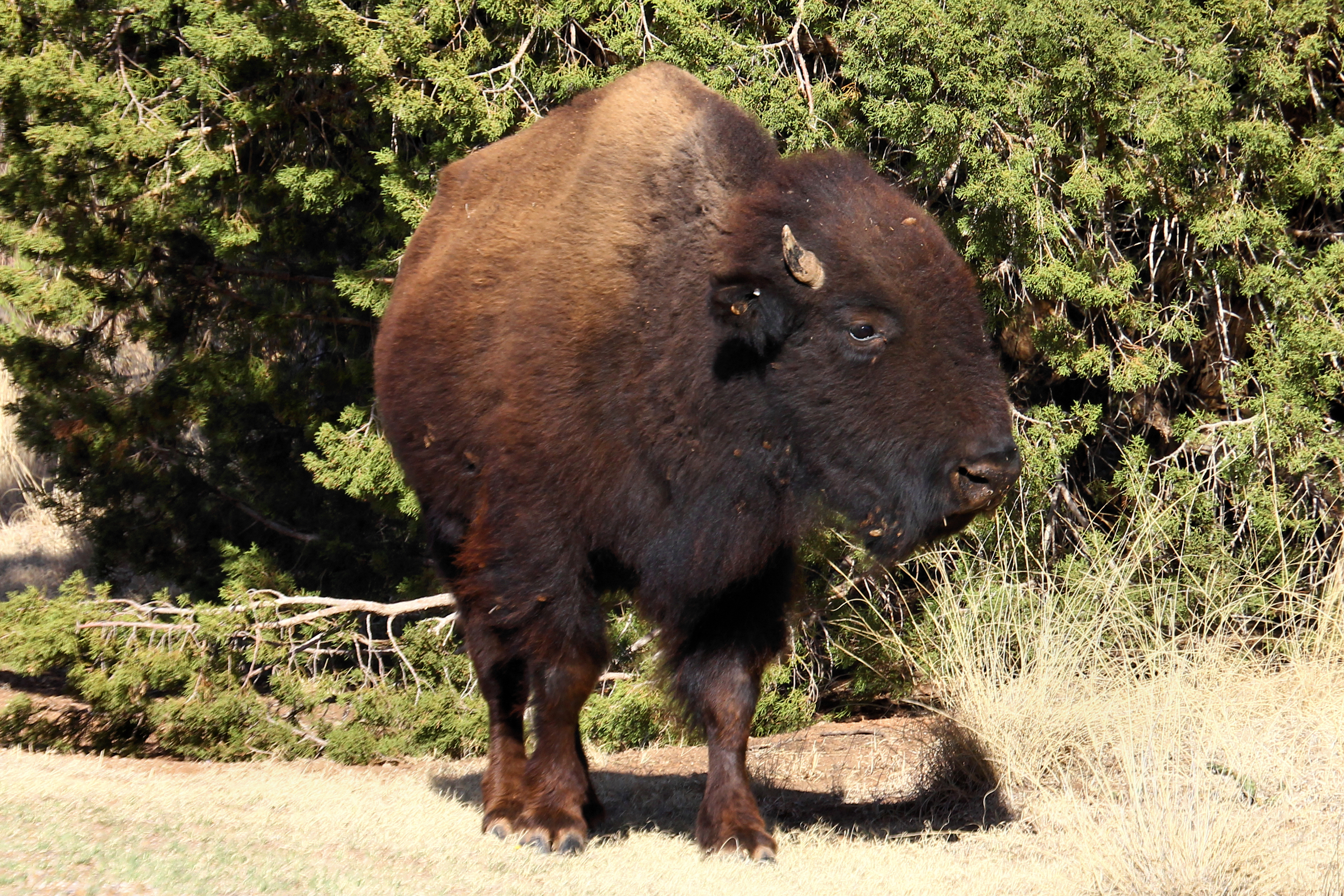
Plains bison (B. b. bison)

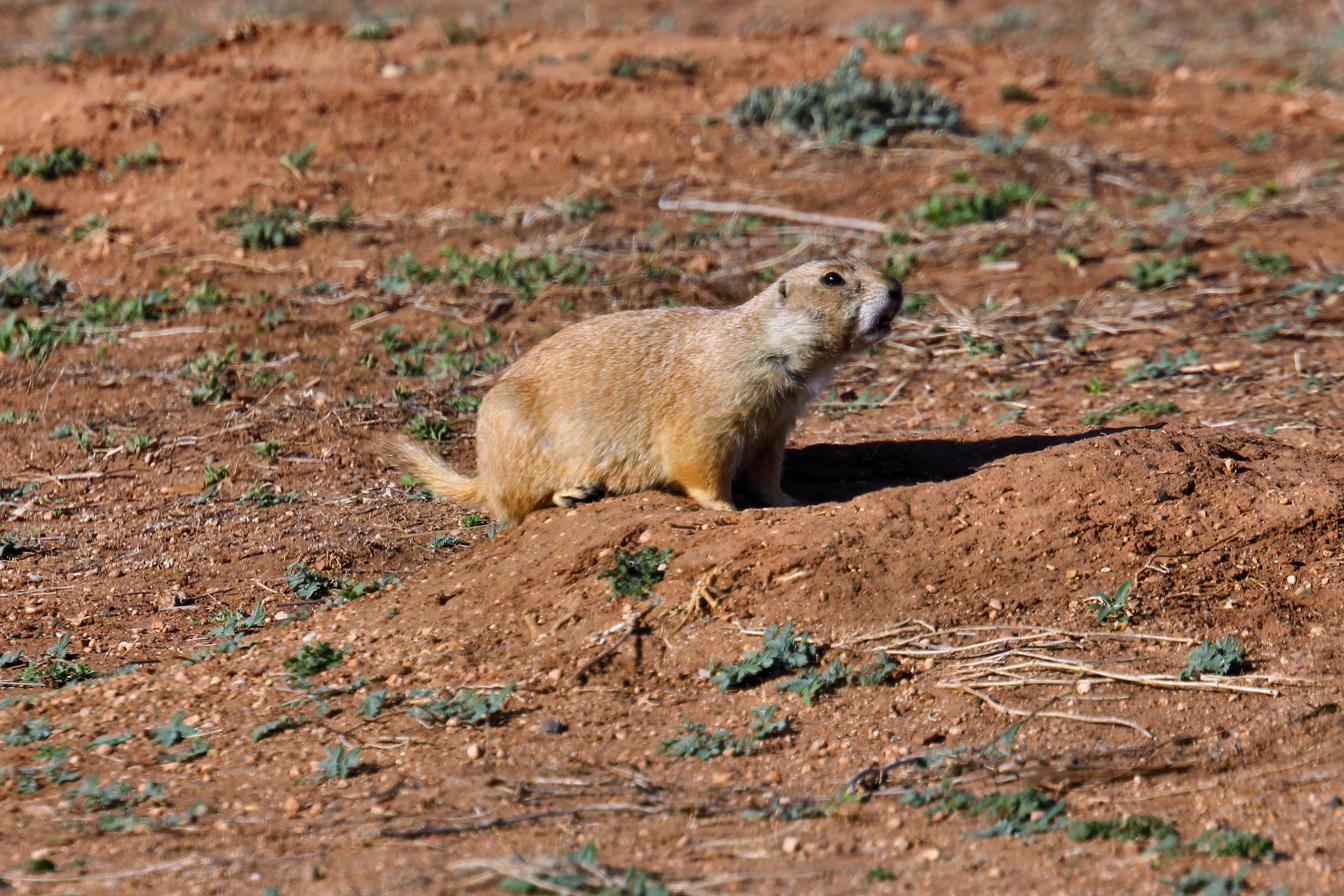
Black-tailed prairie dog (Cynomys ludovicianus)

== Activities ==
Caprock Canyons has camping available at recreational vehicle, tent and equestrian sites. Many of the trails are multi-use for hiking, mountain biking or horseback riding. Wildlife observation of the bison herd and the prairie dog town are highlights of the park. The park is a designated dark-sky preserve which makes stargazing easy. Rangers at the park presents programs on the history and wildlife of the park. During the summer months, they also have guided bus tours to the Clarity Tunnel at dusk to observe the emergence of the bats.

== See also ==
- List of Texas state parks
- Conservation of American bison
- Yellow House Canyon
- Blanco Canyon
- Mount Blanco
- Mushaway Peak
- Quitaque Creek
- Caprock Escarpment
- Prairie Dog Town Fork Red River
- Canyon Valley, Texas
- Double Mountain Fork Brazos River
- North Fork Double Mountain Fork Brazos River
- Little Red River (Texas)
