= Tierra Blanca Creek =

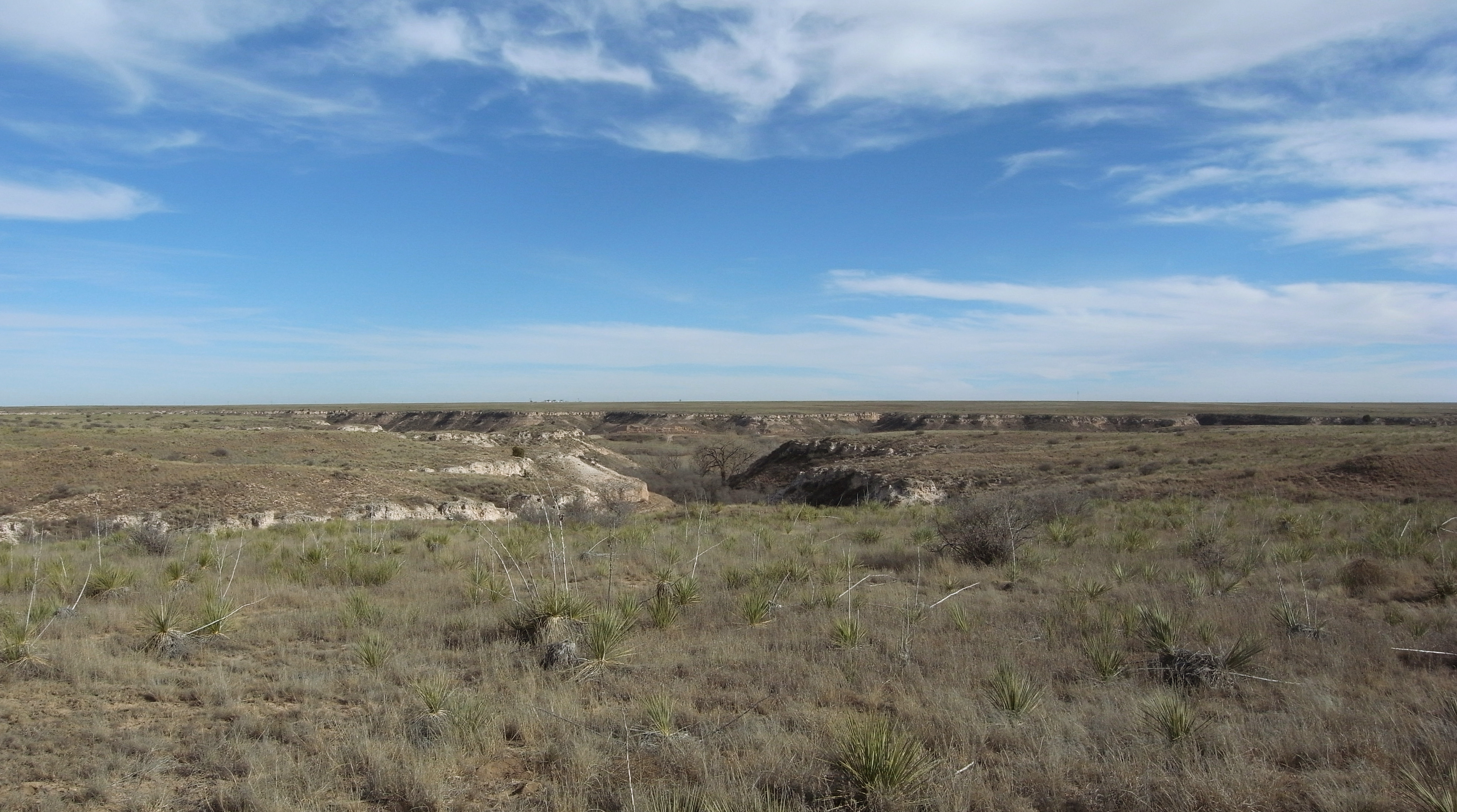
- Canyon carved by Tierra Blanca Creek
- Map of Tierra Blanca Creek

Location
- Country: United States

Physical characteristics
- Source
  - location: Curry County, New Mexico
  - coordinates: 34.8292321°N 103.2227271°W
  - elevation: 4,524 ft (1,379 m)
- Mouth
  - location: Randall County, Texas
  - coordinates: 35.002778°N 101.902500°W
  - elevation: 3,471 ft (1,058 m)
- Length: 109 mi (175 km)

Basin features
- Progression: Prairie Dog Town Fork Red River → Red River of the South → Atchafalaya River

Tierra Blanca Creek is an ephemeral stream about 75 mi (121 km) long, heading in Curry County, New Mexico, flowing east-northeast across northern portions of the Llano Estacado to join Palo Duro Creek to form the Prairie Dog Town Fork Red River southeast of Amarillo, Texas. Overall, Tierra Blanca Creek descends 1,050 ft (320 m) from its headwaters in Eastern New Mexico to its confluence with Palo Duro Creek at the head of Palo Duro Canyon.

The creek's water levels are variable, and it is not unusual for some parts of the creek to be reduced to a small trickle or dry completely during frequent periods of drought in the semi-arid plateau of the northwestern Texas Panhandle. At the same time, as the sole creek bed draining a large region with frequent violent thunderstorms, it is also the site of significant occasional flash floods. Its diminishing flow has been attributed to damming and agricultural pumping of the Ogallala Aquifer.

Tierra Blanca Creek was historically significant as the major running water source for the XIT Ranch, one of the largest cattle ranches in American history. It also contributed to the formation of Palo Duro Canyon, the second largest canyon in the United States.

== The Name ==
Tierra Blanca is Spanish for "white earth". One theory suggests that the name refers to white deposits of Tertiary clay that are found along the sides of the valley. Another theory suggests that it was the exposed traces of white caliche along the valley walls that gave this stream its Spanish name.

== See also ==
- List of rivers of Texas
- Buffalo Lake National Wildlife Refuge
- North Fork Red River
- Pease River
- Washita River
- Wichita River
