= National Register of Historic Places listings in Floyd County, Texas =

Location of Floyd County in Texas

This is a list of the National Register of Historic Places listings in Floyd County, Texas.

This is intended to be a complete list of properties listed on the National Register of Historic Places in Floyd County, Texas. There are three properties listed on the National Register in the county. One property is also a State Antiquities Landmark.

This National Park Service list is complete through NPS recent listings posted March 21, 2025.

== Current listings ==
The publicly disclosed locations of National Register properties may be seen in a mapping service provided.

	Name on the Register	Image	Date listed	Location	City or town	Description
1	Floyd County Stone Corral	Floyd County Stone Corral	September 27, 1984 (#84001666)	Address restricted	Floydada	
2	Floydada Country Club Site	Floydada Country Club Site	November 7, 1979 (#79002939)	Address restricted	Floydada	
3	Quitaque Railway Tunnel		September 13, 1977 (#77001442)	10 mi (16 km). SW of Quitaque; 34°14′34″N 101°07′17″W	Quitaque	Now known as the Clarity Tunnel; State Antiquities Landmark

== See also ==
- National Register of Historic Places listings in Texas
- Recorded Texas Historic Landmarks in Floyd County
