= Quitaque Railway Tunnel =

- U.S. National Register of Historic Places
- Texas State Antiquities Landmark
- Location within Texas Location within the United States
- Nearest city: Quitaque, Texas
- Coordinates: 34°14′34″N 101°7′17″W
- Area: 1 acre (0.40 ha)
- Built: 1928-1930
- Built by: Fort Worth and Denver Railway
- NRHP reference No.: 77001442
- TSAL No.: 8200002372

Significant dates
- Added to NRHP: September 13, 1977
- Designated TSAL: January 1, 2003

The Quitaque Railway Tunnel or Clarity Tunnel is a 582 feet (177 m) abandoned railway tunnel in Floyd County, Texas about 10 miles (16 km) southwest of Quitaque. Construction started in 1927, and the tunnel and associated railway line were completed and opened for use in 1930. The tunnel was listed on the National Register of Historic Places in 1977, and was designated a Texas State Antiquities Landmark in 2003.

The Fort Worth and Denver South Plains Railroad Company built the tunnel for its own use. Irish and Swedish immigrants comprised the construction crews. The tunnel cuts through sandstone of the Caprock Escarpment, about 50 feet below its ridge of about 2,800 elevation. The tunnel was originally 790 feet (240 m) long. After a train wreck in the tunnel in 1973, the line was closed for eighteen months while the tunnel was shortened to its current length, and the rails were upgraded to handle heavier traffic. As of 1976, it was one of very few railway tunnels still in use in Texas.

The line was abandoned in 1989. In 1993, the Texas Parks and Wildlife Department acquired the abandoned right-of-way, and the tunnel is now part of Caprock Canyons State Park and Trailway.

== See also ==
- National Register of Historic Places listings in Floyd County, Texas
