= Quitaque Creek =

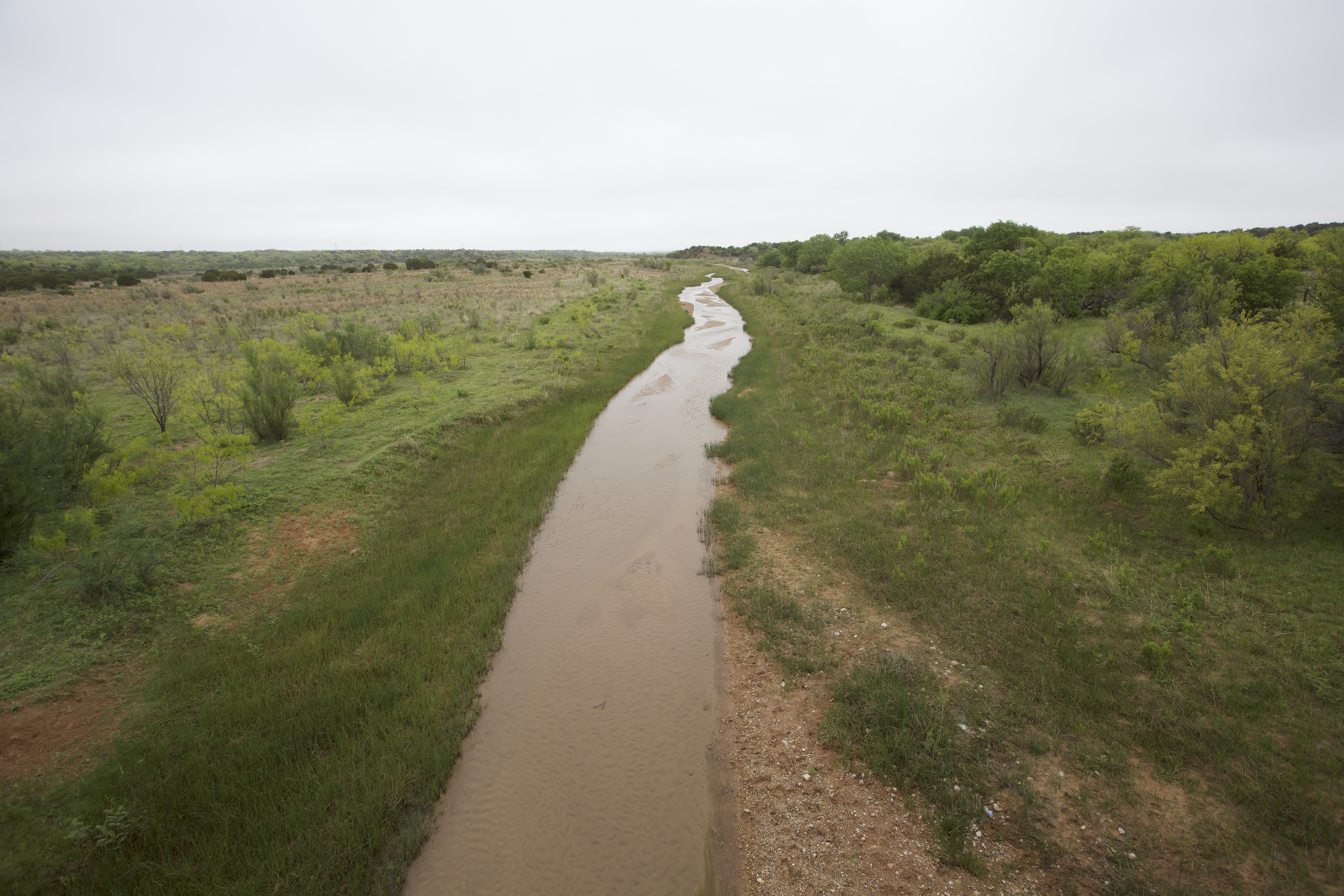
- Quitaque Creek flowing gently across Motley County, Texas

Physical characteristics
- Source
  - location: Floyd County, Texas
  - coordinates: 34.2628473°N 101.4098856°W
  - elevation: 3,262 ft (994 m)
- Mouth
  - location: Motley County, Texas
  - coordinates: 34.2434007°N 100.8412486°W
  - elevation: 2,139 ft (652 m)
- Length: 40 mi (64 km)

Basin features
- River system: Red River of the South
- Tributaries
  - left: Los Lingos Creek

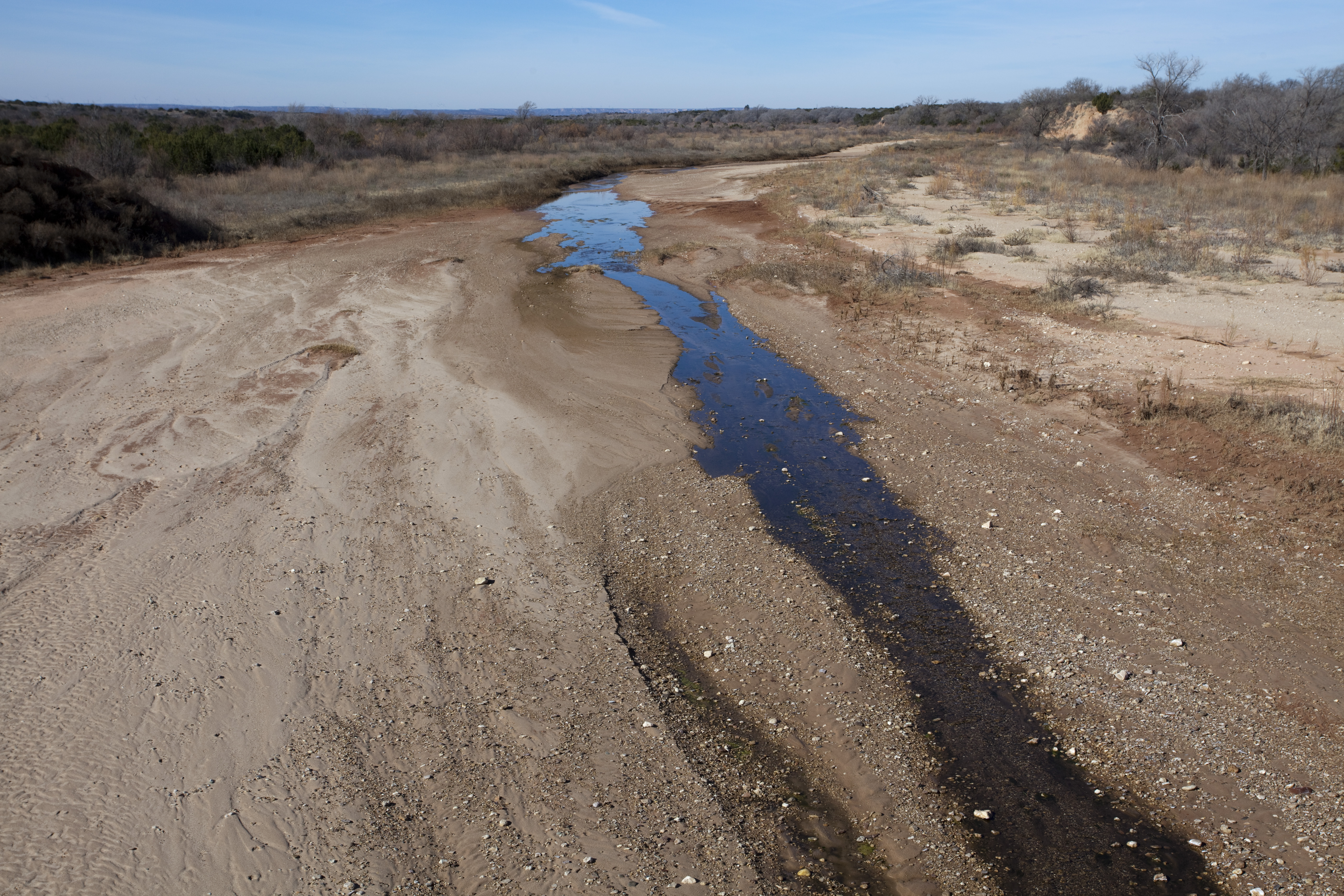
Sandy streambed of Quitaque Creek at FM599 crossing north of Flomot, Texas.

Quitaque Creek is an intermittent stream about 40 mi (64 km) long, originating as a shallow draw on the high plains of the Llano Estacado in Floyd County, Texas, and flowing eastward to join the North Pease River in Motley County, Texas.

== Geography ==
The upland portion of Quitaque Creek is an ephemeral draw that flows only during heavy rain. Quitaque Creek initially runs southeastward across north-central Floyd County and then drops off the Caprock of the Llano Estacado approximately 3 mi (5 km) east of South Plains. The stream then continues in a northeasterly direction across the sparsely populated ranch lands of northeastern Floyd County. After entering Motley County, Quitaque Creek merges with Los Lingos Creek and then turns in a southeasterly direction across northwestern Motley County before merging with the North Pease River, 16 mi (26 km) north of Matador.

Overall, Quitaque Creek descends 1,123 ft (342 m) from its headwaters to its confluence with the North Pease River, passing through flat to moderately steep terrain along its course.

== Proper name ==
Quitaque Creek has been known by various names including: Los Lingos Creek, North Pease River or Quitaque River. In a 1948 decision of the United States Board on Geographical Names, "Quitaque Creek" was recommended as the proper name. In a letter written in 1967 by J. O. Kilmartin, Executive Secretary of Domestic Geographic Names, to a Miss Faye Farley of Houston, Kilmartin suggests that the name "Quitaque" appears to be related to the Quitaca Indians, one of the tribes that accompanied Juan Domínguez de Mendoza on his expedition from the middle Rio Grande to the interior of Texas in 1683–84.

== See also ==
- Salt Fork Red River
- Mulberry Creek
- Little Red River (Texas)
- Pease River
- Double Mountain Fork Brazos River
- List of rivers of Texas
