= Quitaque, Texas =

- City
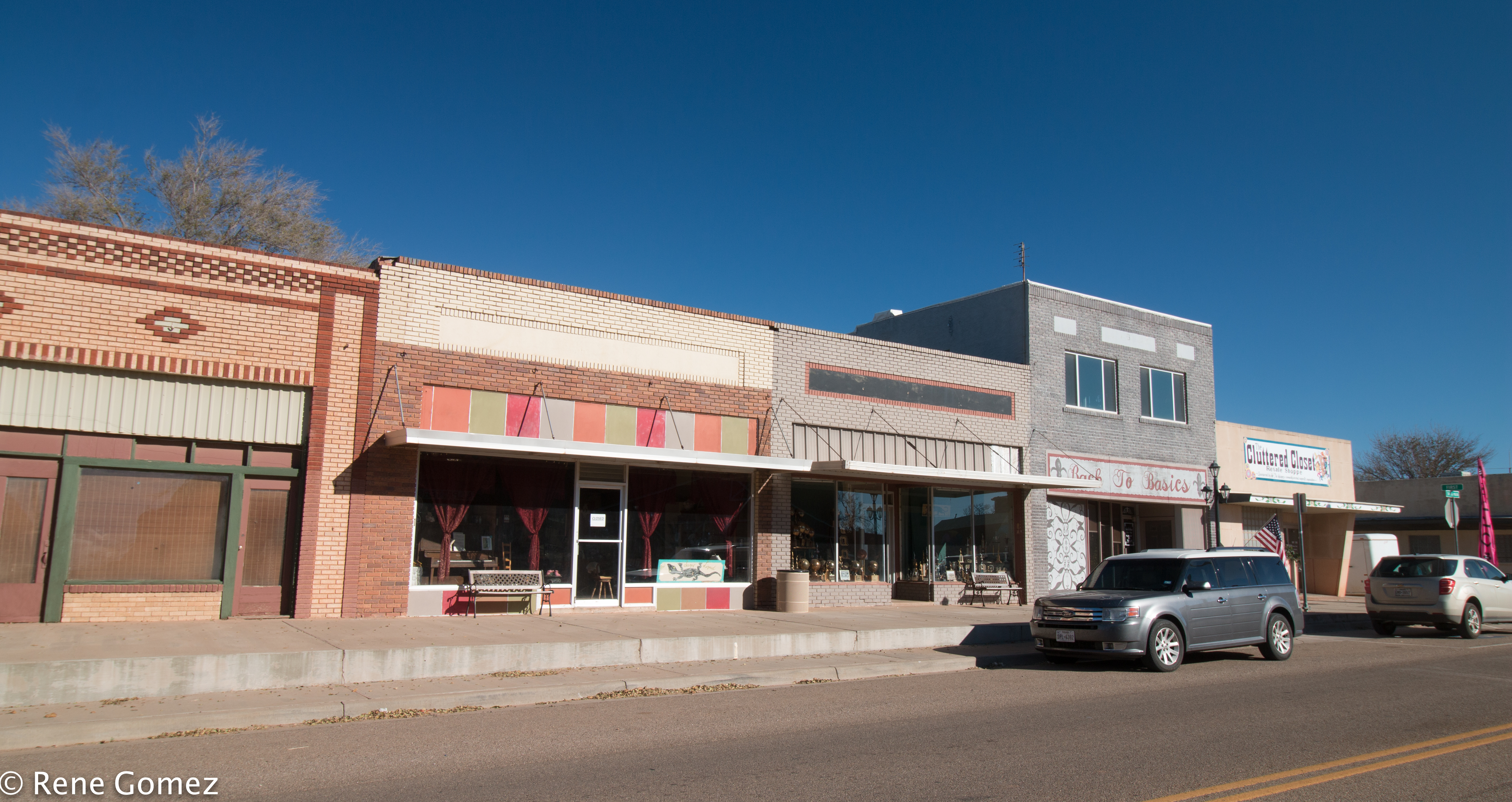

- Coordinates: 34°21′58″N 101°03′26″W
- Country: United States
- State: Texas
- County: Briscoe

Area
  - Total: 0.72 sq mi (1.87 km^{2})
  - Land: 0.72 sq mi (1.87 km^{2})
  - Water: 0 sq mi (0.00 km^{2})
- Elevation: 2,572 ft (784 m)

Population (2020)
  - Total: 342
  - Density: 474/sq mi (183/km^{2})
- Time zone: UTC-6 (Central (CST))
  - Summer (DST): UTC-5 (CDT)
- ZIP code: 79255
- Area code: 806
- FIPS code: 48-60176
- Website: cityofquitaque.com

Quitaque (/ˈkɪtɪkweɪ/ KIT-ih-kway) is a city in southeastern Briscoe County, Texas, United States. The town lies directly south of Caprock Canyon State Park and is a ranching and farming area in West Texas. The population was 342 at the 2020 census, and 411 at the 2010 census.

According to tradition, Quitaque is a name derived from an American Indian language, meaning "end of the trail".

== Geography ==
Quitaque is located along Texas State Highway 86 between Silverton to the west and Turkey to the east. The entrance to Caprock Canyons State Park is located approximately three miles north of Quitaque on Farm to Market Road 1065, and the Caprock Canyons Trailway is located just south of the town. Kent Creek flows past north of the town and Quitaque Creek is about three miles south.

According to the United States Census Bureau, the city has a total area of 0.7 square miles (1.8 km^{2}), all land.

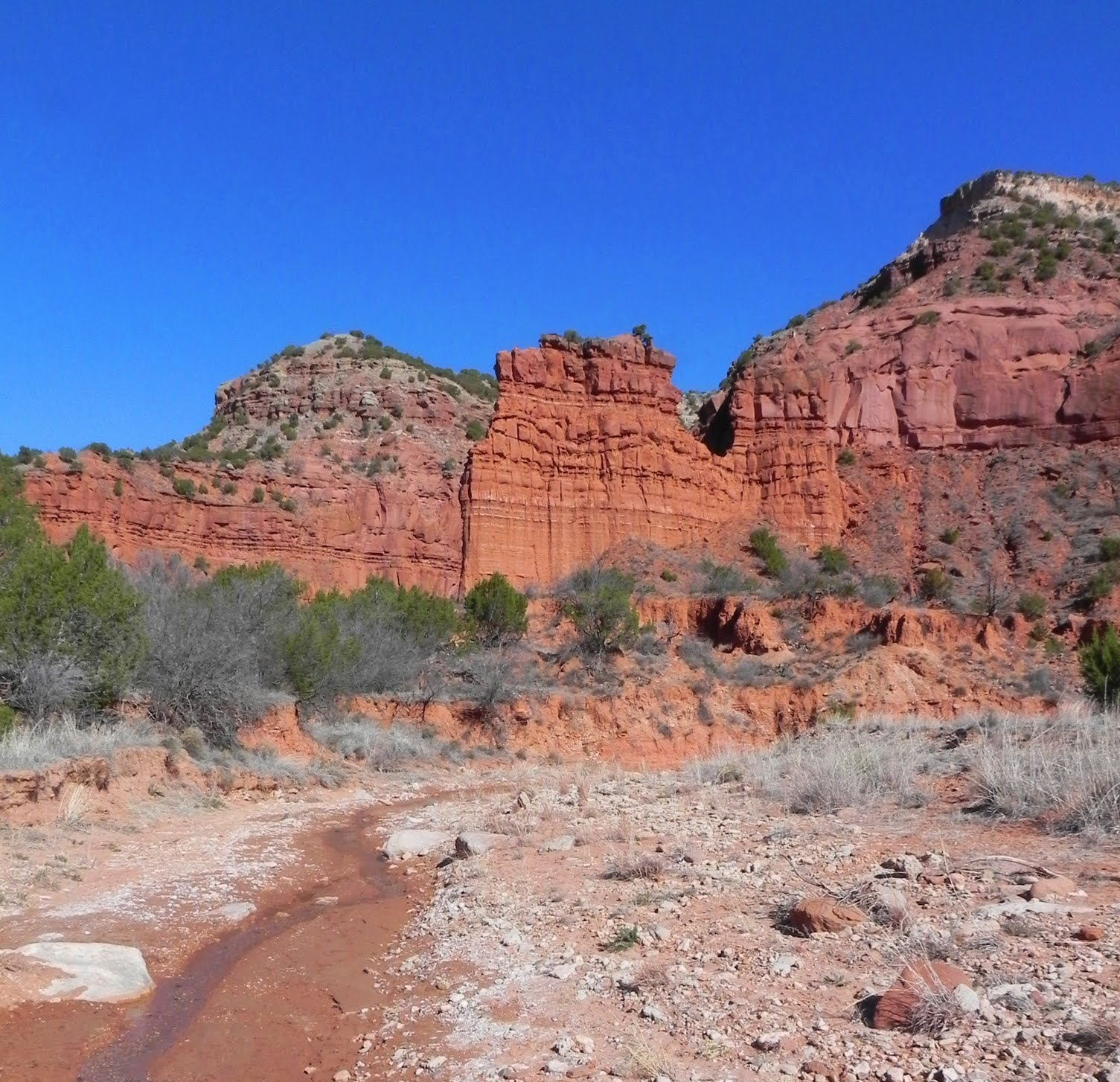
Caprock Canyons State Park is located near Quitaque

=== Climate ===
According to the Köppen climate classification system, Quitaque has a semiarid climate, BSk on climate maps.

== Demographics ==
Historical population
Census	Pop.	Note	%±
1930	945		—
1940	763		−19.3%
1950	647		−15.2%
1960	586		−9.4%
1970	601		2.6%
1980	696		15.8%
1990	513		−26.3%
2000	432		−15.8%
2010	411		−4.9%
2020	342		−16.8%
U.S. Decennial Census

=== 2020 census ===
As of the 2020 census, Quitaque had a population of 342, 149 households, and 94 families. The median age was 44.0 years; 26.3% of residents were under the age of 18 and 22.2% of residents were 65 years of age or older. For every 100 females there were 93.2 males, and for every 100 females age 18 and over there were 86.7 males age 18 and over.

0.0% of residents lived in urban areas, while 100.0% lived in rural areas.

There were 149 households in Quitaque, of which 30.9% had children under the age of 18 living in them. Of all households, 47.7% were married-couple households, 18.1% were households with a male householder and no spouse or partner present, and 29.5% were households with a female householder and no spouse or partner present. About 30.9% of all households were made up of individuals and 21.5% had someone living alone who was 65 years of age or older.

There were 221 housing units, of which 32.6% were vacant. The homeowner vacancy rate was 6.0% and the rental vacancy rate was 41.2%.

Racial composition as of the 2020 census
Race	Number	Percent
White	255	74.6%
Black or African American	5	1.5%
American Indian and Alaska Native	2	0.6%
Asian	0	0.0%
Native Hawaiian and Other Pacific Islander	0	0.0%
Some other race	45	13.2%
Two or more races	35	10.2%
Hispanic or Latino (of any race)	113	33.0%

=== 2000 census ===
As of the census of 2000, 432 people, 182 households, and 117 families resided in the city. The population density was 600.8 inhabitants per square mile (232.0/km^{2}). The 252 housing units averaged 350.5 per square mile (135.1/km^{2}). The racial makeup of the city was 79.40% White, 5.79% African American, 0.23% Native American, 12.50% from other races, and 2.08% from two or more races. Hispanics or Latinos of any race were 27.08% of the population.

Of the 182 households, 28.0% had children under the age of 18 living with them, 49.5% were married couples living together, 11.5% had a female householder with no husband present, and 35.2% were not families. About 33.0% of all households were made up of individuals, and 17.6% had someone living alone who was 65 years of age or older. The average household size was 2.37 and the average family size was 3.04.

In the city, the population was distributed as 27.5% under the age of 18, 5.6% from 18 to 24, 20.1% from 25 to 44, 27.8% from 45 to 64, and 19.0% who were 65 years of age or older. The median age was 42 years. For every 100 females, there were 87.0 males. For every 100 females age 18 and over, there were 84.1 males.

The median income for a household in the city was $27,143, and for a family was $33,750. Males had a median income of $28,750 versus $18,125 for females. The per capita income for the city was $13,619. About 14.1% of families and 18.5% of the population were below the poverty line, including 28.6% of those under age 18 and 13.0% of those age 65 or over.

== Arts and culture ==
Governor Greg Abbott declared the city the Bison Capital of Texas in 2015. A BisonFest is held every year to raise money for the bison herd at Caprock Canyons.

== Education ==
The City of Quitaque is served by the Turkey-Quitaque Independent School District.

Briscoe County is in the service area of Clarendon College.

== Notable person ==
The Texas high-school and college football coach Gene Mayfield was born in Quitaque in 1928.

== See also ==
- Quitaque Creek
- Little Red River
- Caprock Escarpment
- Prairie Dog Town Fork Red River
