= Little Red River (Texas) =

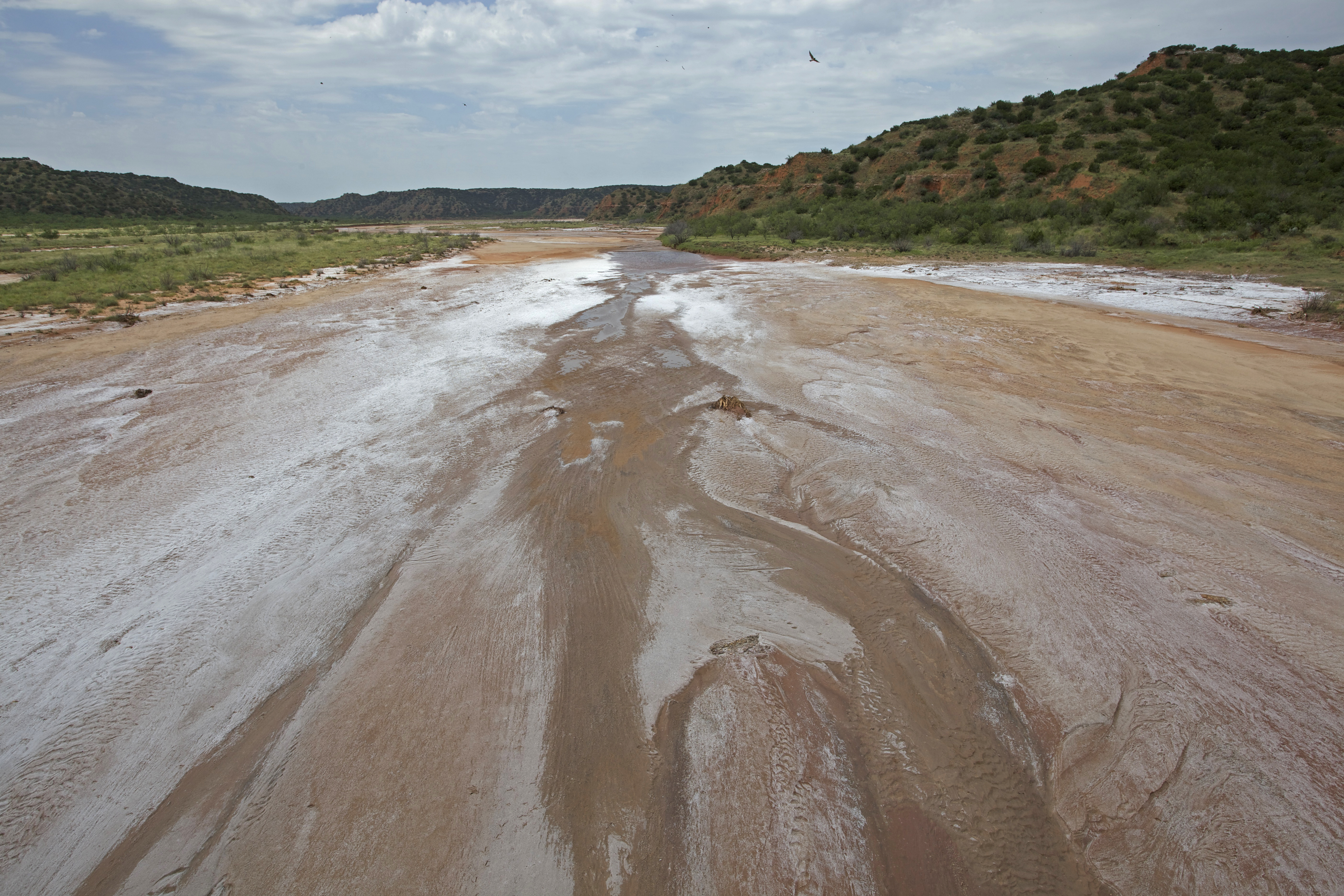
- Salty bed and red bluffs, Little Red River, Hall County, Texas

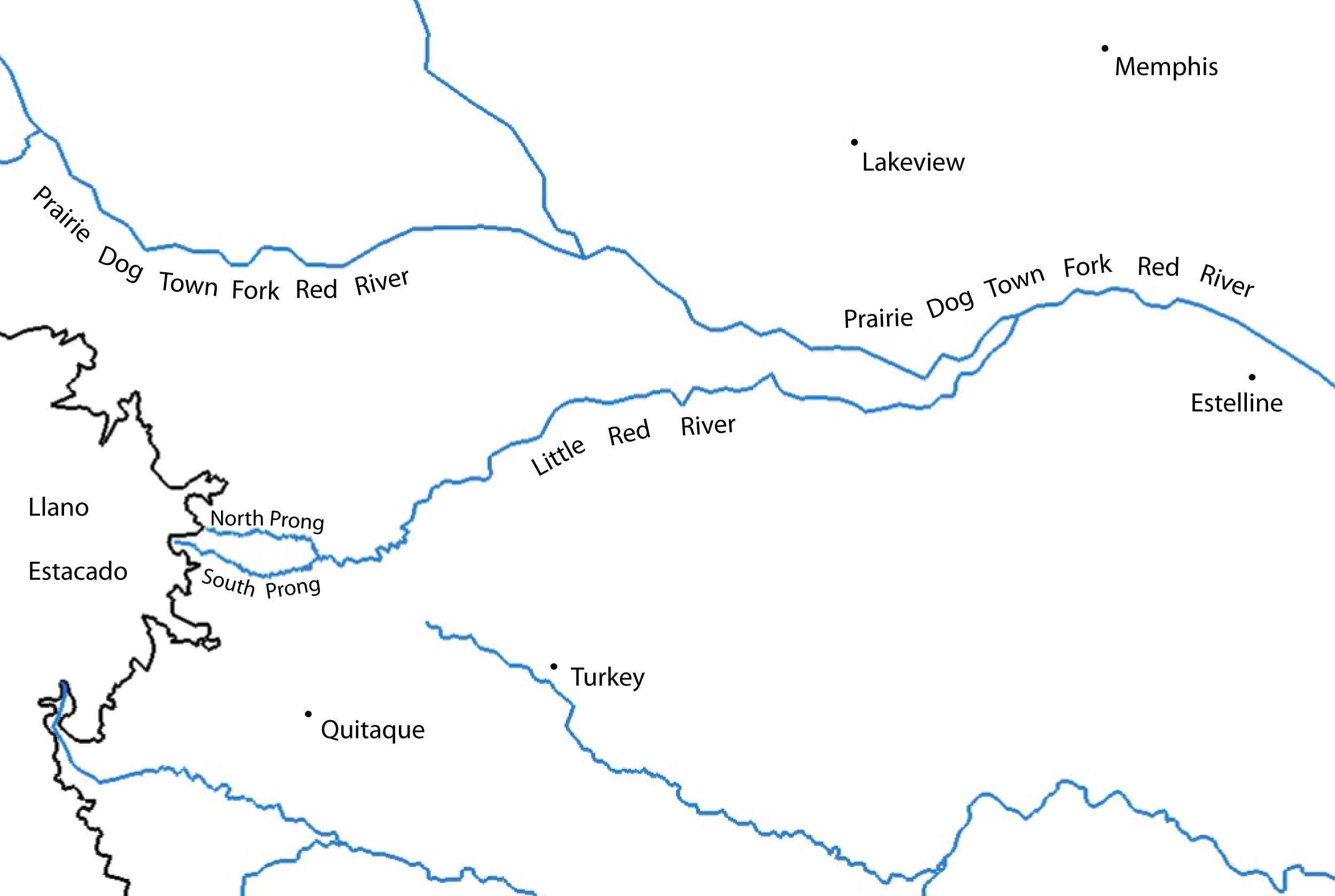

Physical characteristics
- Source
  - location: Briscoe County, Texas
  - coordinates: 34.4503416°N 101.0512593°W
  - elevation: 2,282 ft (696 m)
- Mouth
  - location: Hall County, Texas
  - coordinates: 34.5664465°N 100.6054053°W
  - elevation: 1,839 ft (561 m)
- Length: 30 mi (48 km)

Basin features
- River system: Red River of the South
- Tributaries
  - left: North Prong Little Red River
  - right: South Prong Little Red River

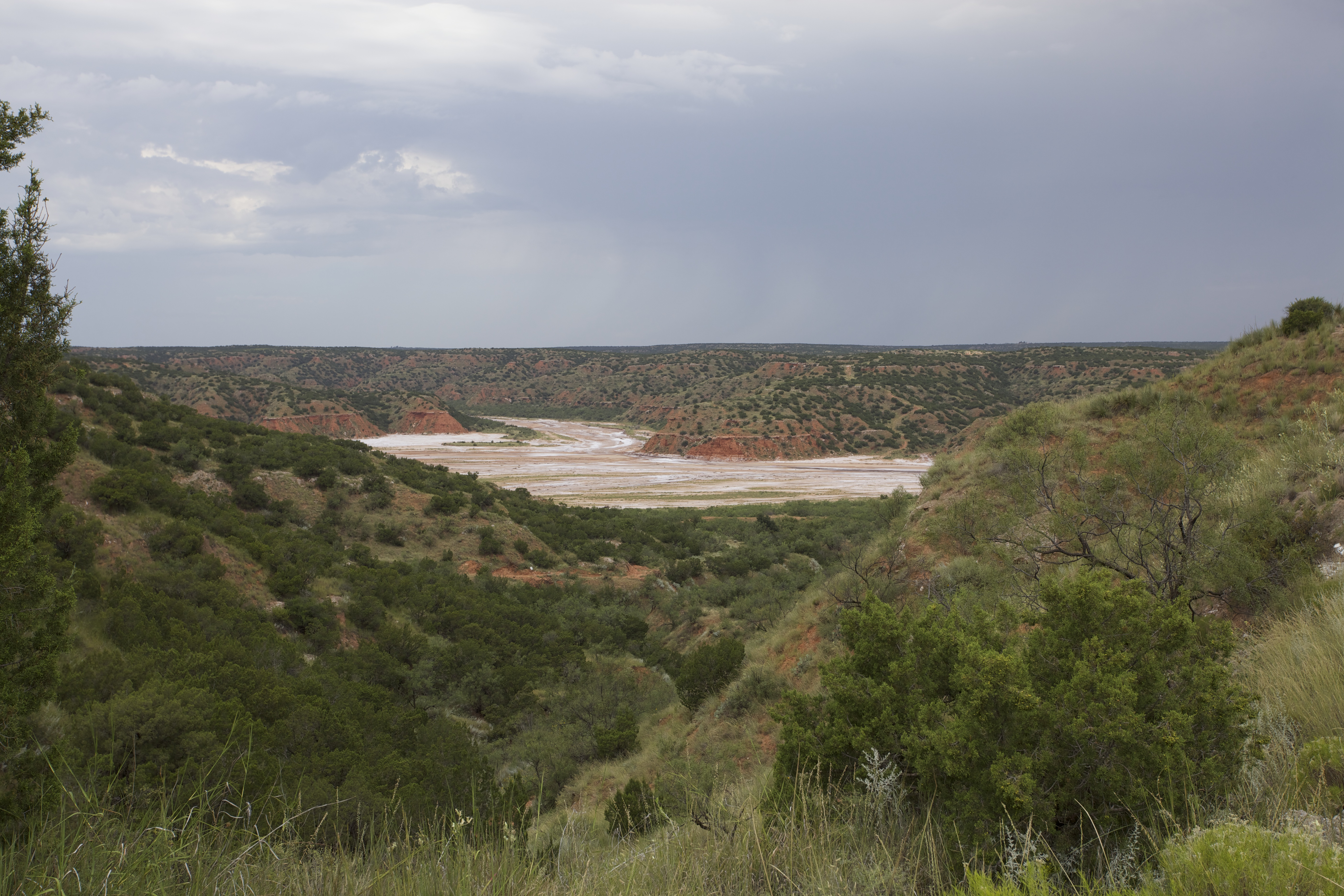
Valley of the Little Red River.

The Little Red River is an intermittent stream about 30 mi (48 km) long, formed at the confluence of the North Prong and South Prong Little Red River in Briscoe County, Texas, and flowing east-northeastward to join the Prairie Dog Town Fork Red River in Hall County, Texas.

== Geography ==
The upper tributaries of the Little Red River are ephemeral streams known as the North Prong and South Prong Red River. Both streams originate along the eastern Caprock Escarpment of the Llano Estacado in Briscoe County, Texas, and flow through Caprock Canyons State Park. The North Prong flows to the north and the South Prong passes to the south of Haynes Ridge, a landmark feature of Caprock Canyons. The North Prong and South Prong merge at a point about 6 mi (9.7 km) north of Quitaque, Texas, to form the Little Red River proper.

The Little Red River initially runs eastward across Briscoe County and then turns northeastward as it approaches the Hall County line. The stream then continues in an easterly direction across sparsely populated ranch country of Hall County before merging with the Prairie Dog Town Fork Red River.

Overall, the Little Red River and its tributaries descend 1,322 ft (403 m) from its headwaters to its confluence with the Prairie Dog Town Fork, in a 48-km journey passing through flat to moderately steep terrain along its course.

== See also ==
- Salt Fork Red River
- Palo Duro Canyon
- Washita River
- Pease River
- Quitaque Creek
- Double Mountain Fork Brazos River
- List of rivers of Texas
