= Red River of the South =

Major river in the southern United States

Red River Rivière Rouge (former French name), Río Colorado (former Spanish name)
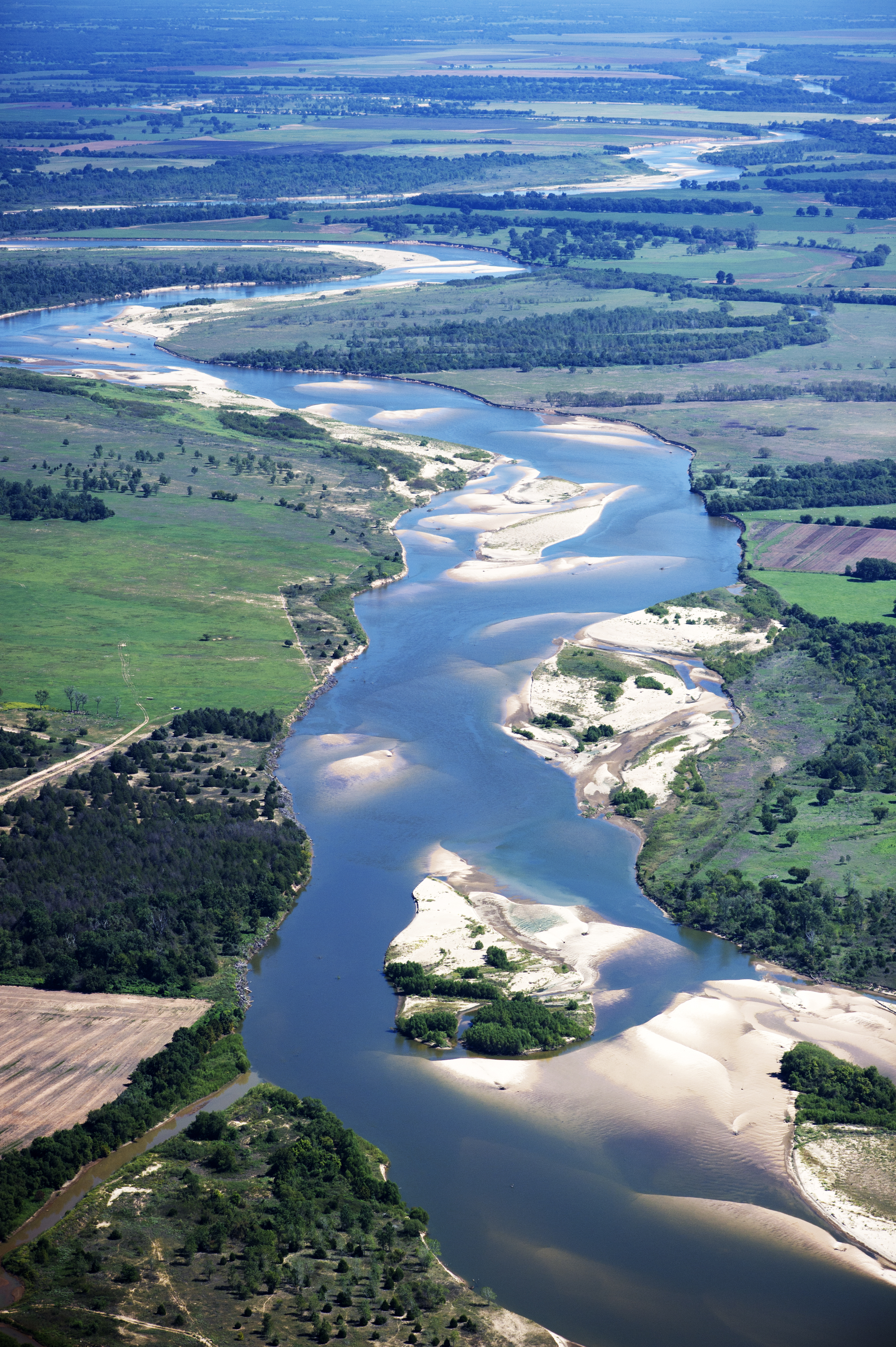
- Red River looking east, north of Bonham, Texas: Texas is to the right, Oklahoma is on the left, and the border between the two states runs along the south (right) bank of the river.

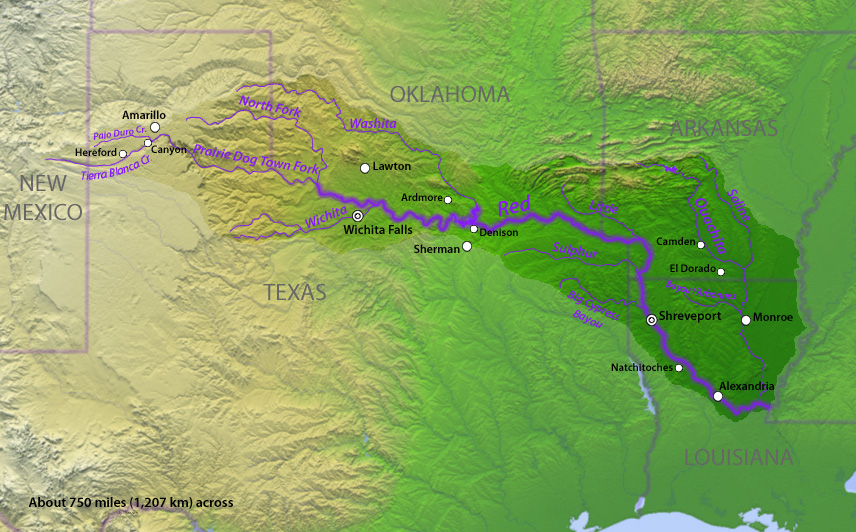
- Map of the Red River watershed
- Native name: Bah'hatteno (Caddo); Tawishimili (Tunica)

Location
- Country: United States
- States: Texas, Oklahoma, Arkansas, and Louisiana

Physical characteristics
- Source
  - location: Confluence of the Prairie Dog Town Fork and Buck Creek, Harmon County, Oklahoma
  - coordinates: 34°34′35″N 99°57′54″W
  - elevation: 1,535 ft (468 m)
- Mouth
  - location: Atchafalaya River
  - coordinates: 31°01′10″N 91°44′52″W
  - elevation: 30 ft (9.1 m)
- Length: 1,360 mi (2,190 km)
- Basin size: 65,595 sq mi (169,890 km^{2})
- Discharge
  - location: mouth; max and min at Alexandria, LA
  - average: 57,000 cu ft/s (1,600 m^{3}/s)
  - minimum: 1,472 cu ft/s (41.7 m^{3}/s)
  - maximum: 233,000 cu ft/s (6,600 m^{3}/s)

The Red River is a major river in the Southern United States. It was named for its reddish water color from passing through red-bed country in its watershed. It is known as the Red River of the South to distinguish it from the Red River of the North, which flows between Minnesota and North Dakota into the Canadian province of Manitoba. Although once a tributary of the Mississippi River, the Red River now is a tributary of the Atchafalaya River, a distributary of the Mississippi that flows separately into the Gulf of Mexico. This confluence is connected to the Mississippi River by the Old River Control Structure.

The south bank of the Red River formed part of the US–Mexico border from the Adams–Onís Treaty (in force only in 1821) until the Texas Annexation and the Treaty of Guadalupe Hidalgo.

The Red River basin is the second-largest in the southern Great Plains. It rises in two branches in the Texas panhandle and flows eastward, serving as a border between the states of Texas and Oklahoma. It forms a short border between Texas and Arkansas before entering Arkansas. It forms much of the eastern border of Miller County, Arkansas, turning south near Fulton and flowing into Louisiana, where it feeds the Atchafalaya River. The total length of the river is 1,360 miles (2,190 km), with a mean flow of over 57,000 cubic feet per second (1,600 m^{3}/s) at its mouth.

== Geography ==
=== Course ===
The Red River begins at the junction of Buck Creek and Prairie Dog Town Fork in Harmon County, Oklahoma. (Note: According to the USGS. Previous versions of this article (source unclear) claim the stretch downstream of Buck Creek as a continuation of the Prairie Dog Town Fork, with the Red River beginning at Salt Fork.) Specialists have debated whether the North Fork or the Prairie Dog Town Fork is the true stem.

In 1852, Randolph B. Marcy's expedition had followed the Prairie Dog Town Fork. Because of a cartographic error, the land between the north and south forks was claimed by both the state of Texas and the United States federal government. Originally called Greer County, Texas, the US Supreme Court ruled that it belonged to the United States, which at the time oversaw the Oklahoma Territory. That territory was later incorporated into the state of Oklahoma, whose southern border follows the south fork. Today, the southern Prairie Dog Town Fork is considered the main fork, though the North Fork is as long and normally has a greater water flow.

The southern fork, about 120 miles (190 km) long, is formed in Randall County, Texas, near Canyon, by the confluence of Tierra Blanca Creek and intermittent Palo Duro Creek (not to be confused with another Palo Duro Creek 75 miles to the north, which drains into the North Canadian River). It turns and flows southeast through Palo Duro Canyon at an elevation of 3,440 feet (1,050 m) and past Newlin, Texas, to cross the Oklahoma state line. About 2 miles south of Elmer, Oklahoma, the Salt Fork of the Red River joins from the north. These combined waters receive the North Fork Red River from the north about 10 mi (16 km) west-southwest of Frederick, Oklahoma, to form the Red River proper.

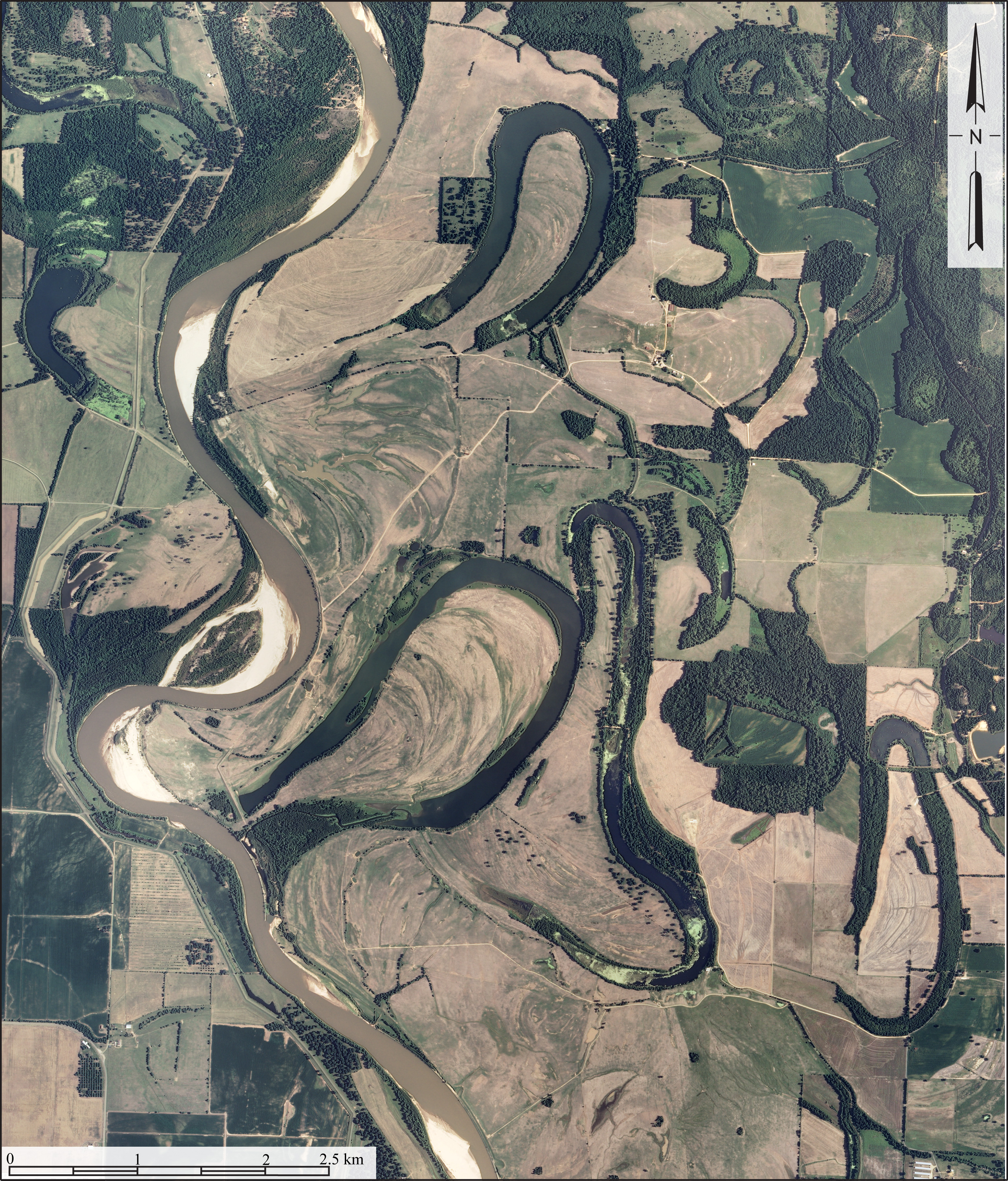
Point bars, abandoned meander loops, oxbow lakes in Lafayette and Miller counties, Arkansas

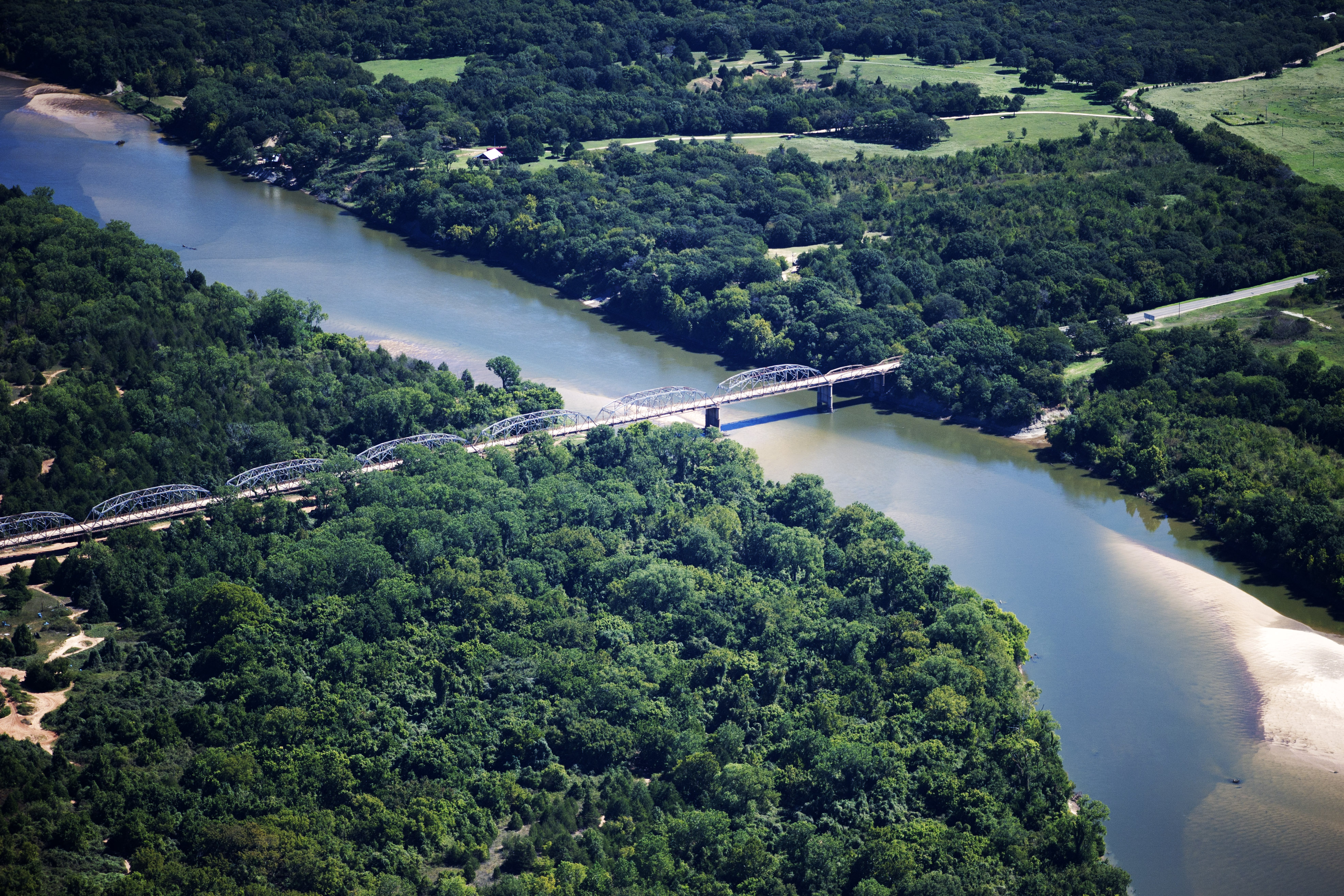
State Highway No. 78 Bridge at the Red River between Oklahoma and Texas, photographed on the Oklahoma side

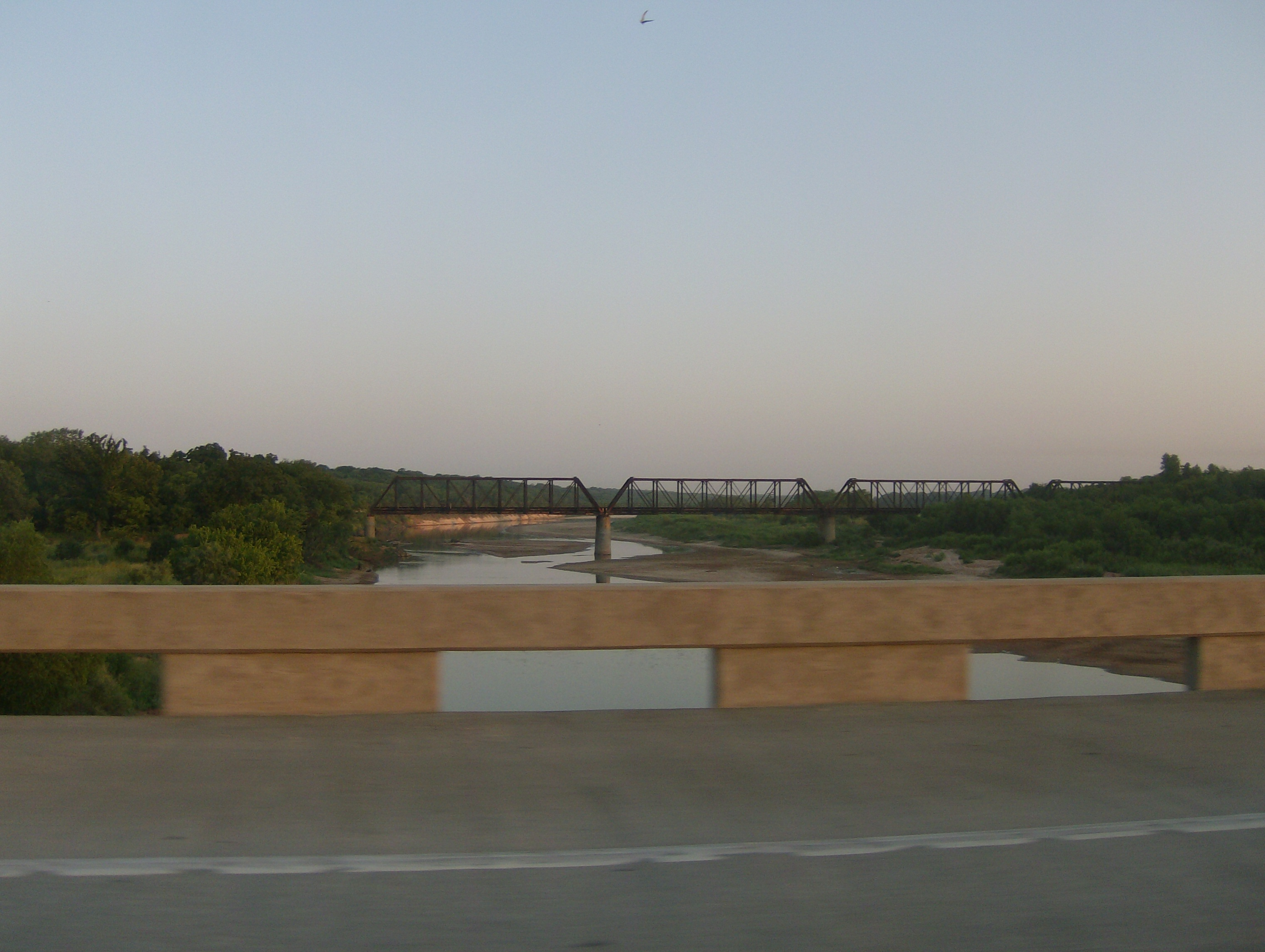
Crossing the Red River at the Texas–Oklahoma border from I-35

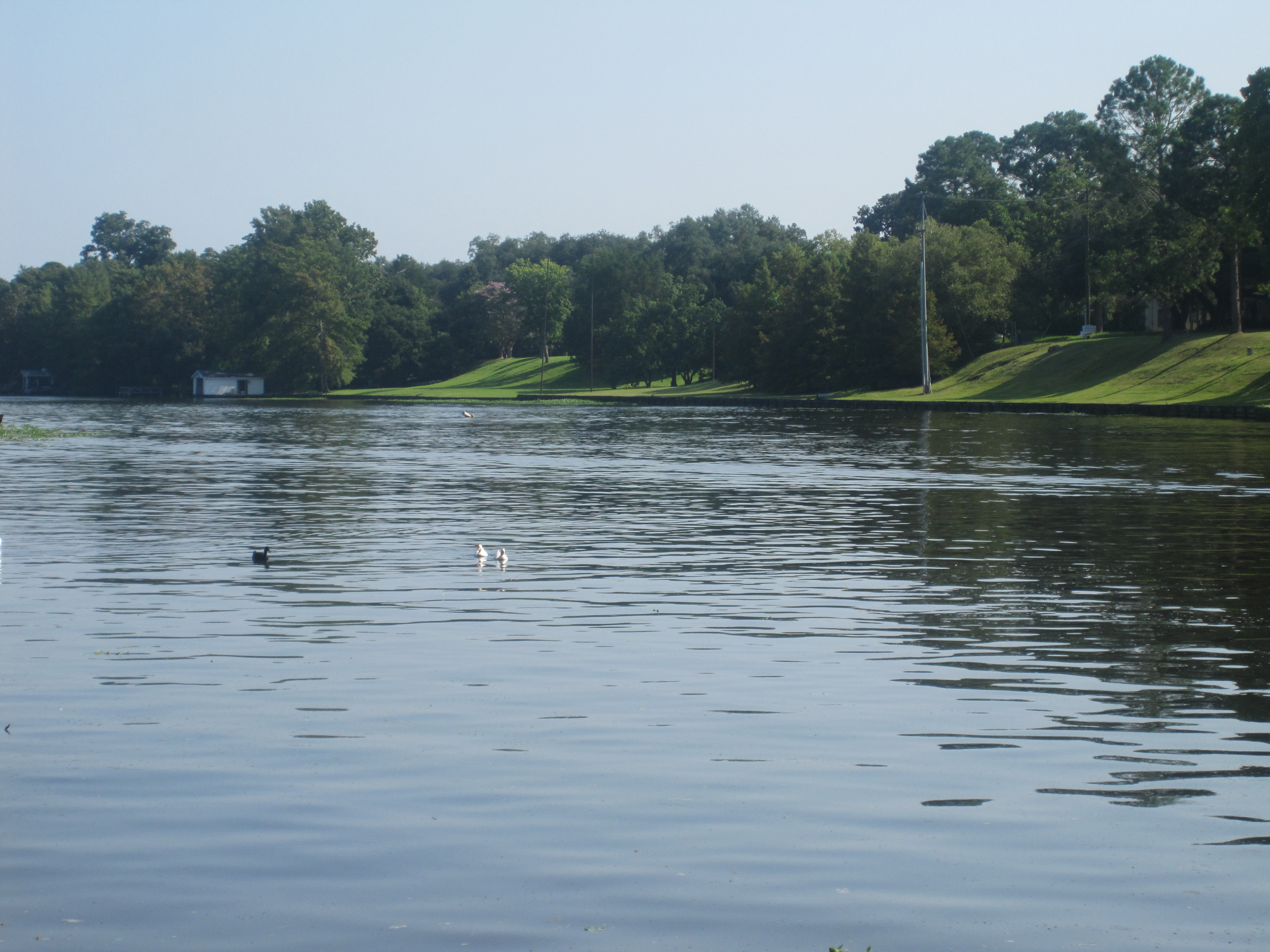
The Red River took a new channel near Natchitoches, Louisiana, and left behind Cane River Lake.

The combined river follows a meandering course east through one of the most arid parts of the Great Plains, receiving the Wichita River about 25 miles northeast of Wichita Falls, Texas. Near Denison, the river exits the eastern end of Lake Texoma, a reservoir formed by the Denison Dam. (The lake is also fed by the Washita River from the north.) Beyond the dam it runs generally east towards Arkansas, receiving Oklahoma's Muddy Boggy Creek on the left bank before turning southward near Texarkana.

The waterway crosses south into Louisiana. The sister cities of Shreveport and Bossier City were developed on either bank of the river, as were the downriver cities of Alexandria and Pineville. After being joined from the north by the Black River (downstream name of the Ouachita River, its largest tributary) about 1.5 miles south of Acme, the river broadens into a complex network of marshlands west of the Mississippi River. Its waters eventually become a tributary of the Atchafalaya River and flow generally southward into the Gulf of Mexico.

=== Tributaries ===
Tributaries include the Little Red River, Prairie Dog Town Fork Red River, Salt Fork Red River, North Fork Red River, Cross Bayou, Pease River, Washita River, Kiamichi River, Wichita River, Little Wichita River, Little River, Sulphur River, Bayou Brevelle, Loggy Bayou (through Lake Bistineau and Dorcheat Bayou), the Blue River, as well as the Ouachita River (also known as the Black River at that point) not far (at Acme, Louisiana) from the mouth.

=== Salinity ===
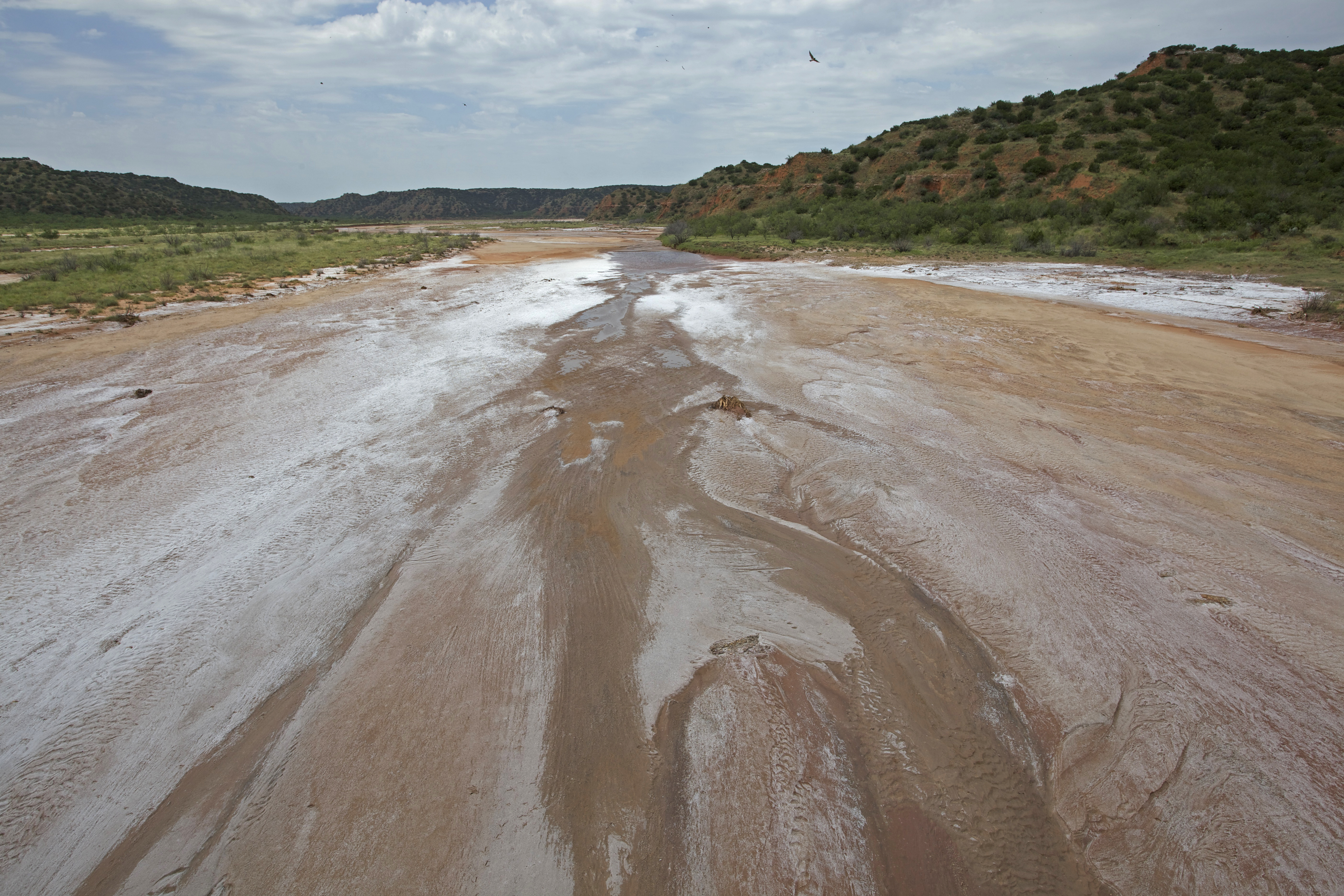
Salt beds in the Little Red River, a tributary of the upper Red River

The river is salty through tributaries above Lake Texoma. The saltiness is caused by Permian salt deposits, mostly sodium chloride. Deposition eventually buried the deposits, but the salt continues to leach through natural seeps in tributaries above Lake Texoma, sending as much as 3,450 tons of salt per day flowing down the Red River.

== Watershed ==
The watershed covers 65,590 square miles (169,900 km^{2}) and is the southernmost major river system in the Great Plains. Its drainage basin is mostly in Texas and Oklahoma but also covers parts of New Mexico, Arkansas and Louisiana. Its basin is characterized by flat, fertile agricultural land, with only a few major cities. The drainage basin is arid. As a result, much of the river above the Texas–Oklahoma border is intermittent, and the flow varies widely until the river is beyond its great bend south in Arkansas. Most of the agriculture in the basin is sustained by groundwater, which is recharged with rainfall and river flow. The lower course flows through a series of marshes and swamps, which dramatically moderate its flow. The Red River is said to have once carried five times the sediment load of the Mississippi.

== History ==
=== Native Americans ===
Native American cultures along the river were diverse, developing specialized adaptations to the many different environments. Starting near the headwaters, the Plains division of the Lipan Apache dominated the western Red River area until the 18th century, when they were displaced by invading Comanche from the north. The middle part of the river was dominated by the Wichita and Tonkawa. This area was prairie, where Native Americans constructed portable and temporary tepees for housing. They practiced limited farming and followed game in seasonal, nomadic hunting cycles. By the time of European contact, the eastern Piney Woods of the lower river courses were dominated by the numerous historic tribes of the Caddo Confederacy. They found plentiful game and fish, and also had good land for cultivating staple crops.

=== American exploration and settlement, 1806 onwards ===
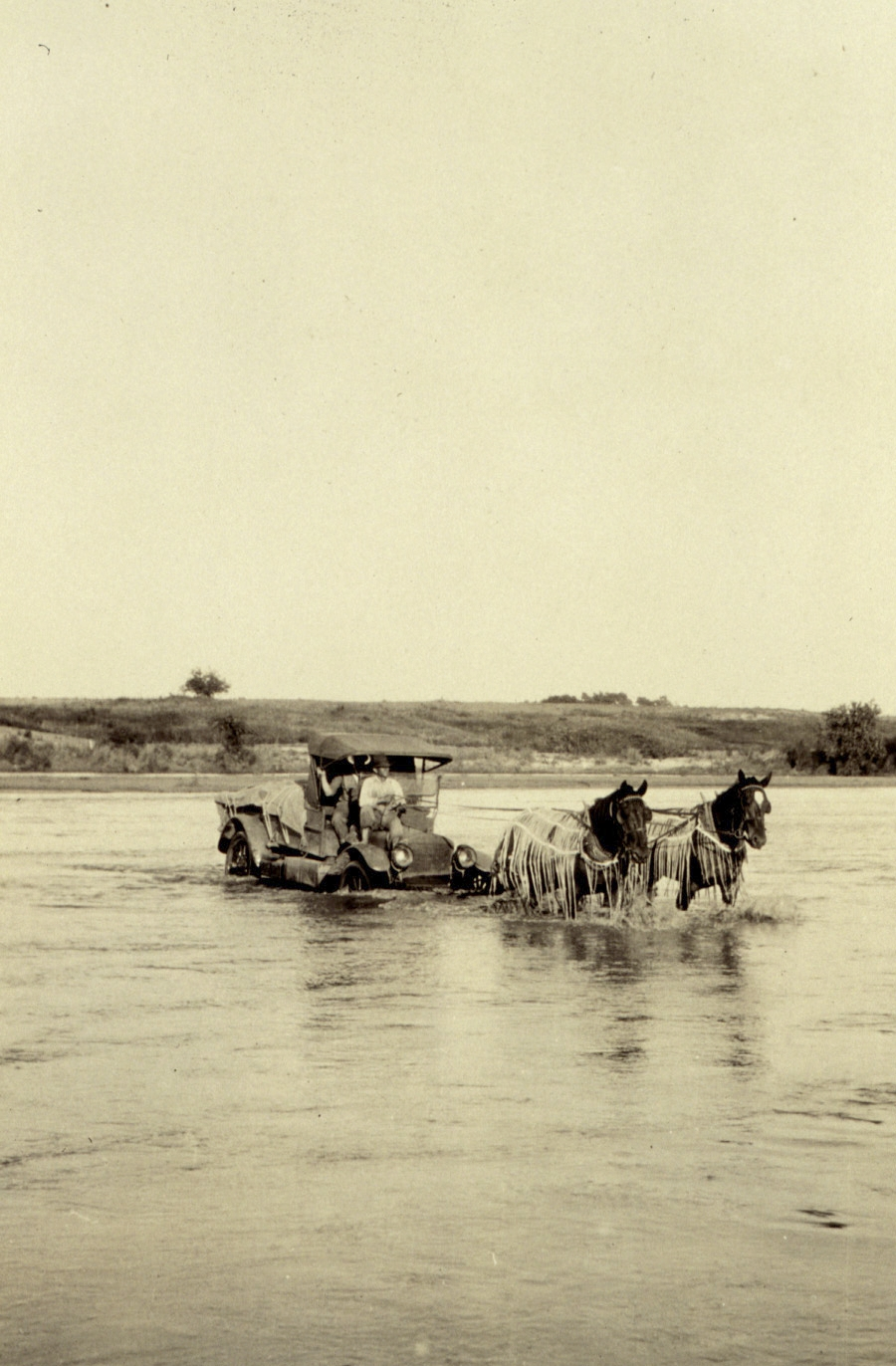
Crossing the North Fork of the Red River near Granite, Oklahoma, 1921.

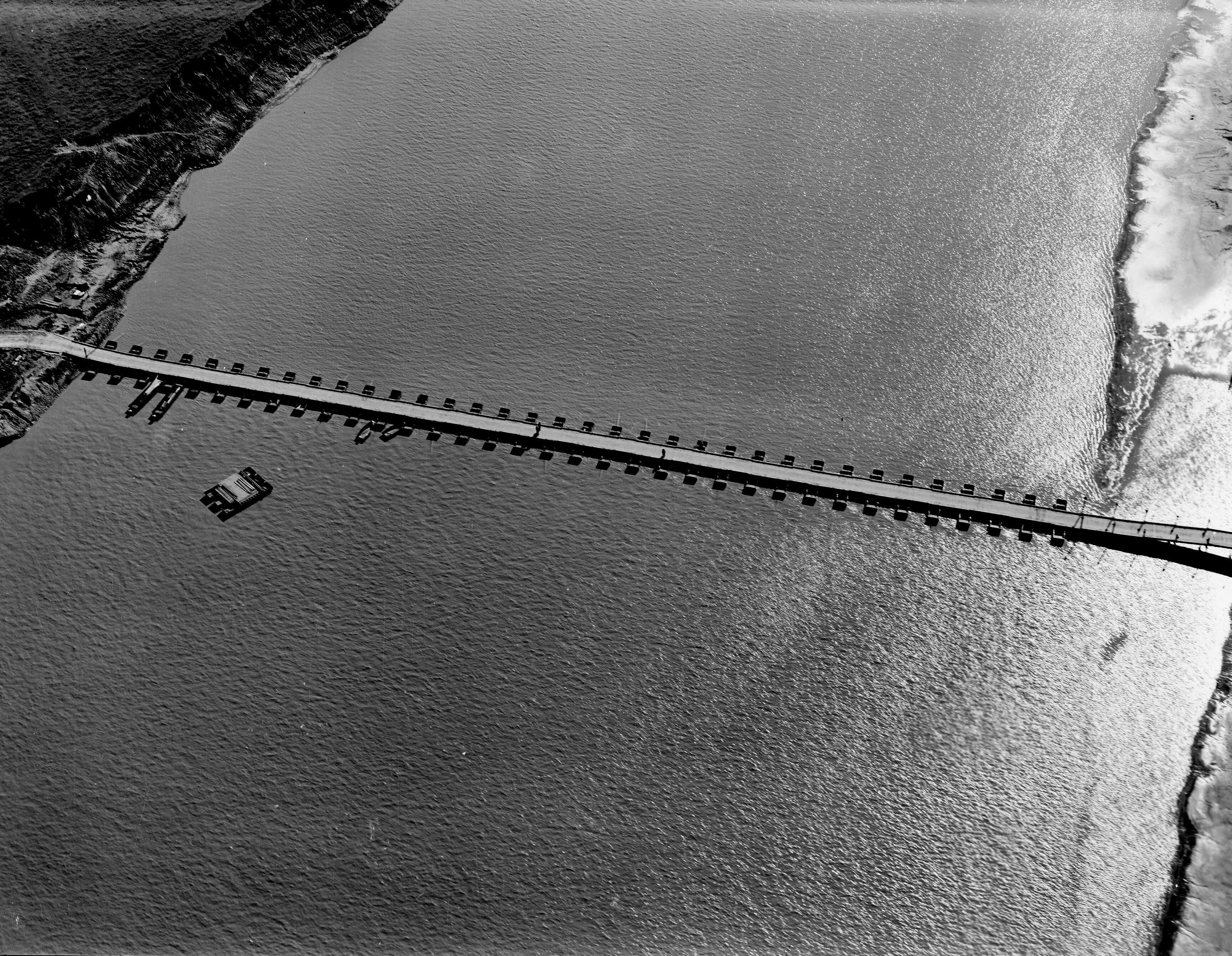
Pontoon bridge crossing Red River at Lake End, Louisiana in 1942

In 1806, President Thomas Jefferson commissioned the Red River Expedition to explore parts of the new lands of the 1803 Louisiana Purchase by traveling up the Red River. Jefferson wrote in a letter to explorer William Dunbar that the river was "in truth, next to the Missouri, the most interesting water of the Mississippi". Having threaded the maze of bayous at the river's confluence and the "Great Raft" of lodged driftwood, the expedition was stopped by the Spanish near present-day New Boston, Texas.

In 1806, Lieutenant Zebulon Pike, under orders to ascertain the source of the Red River, ascended the Arkansas River, made his way downstream on what turned out to be the Rio Grande, and was sent home by the Spanish authorities. A more successful exploration of the river's upper reaches to both its sources came with the 1852 expedition under Captain Randolph Barnes Marcy, assisted by Brevet Captain George B. McClellan. A decade later McClellan became an important general in the American Civil War.

In April 1815, Captain Henry Miller Shreve was the first person to bring a steamboat, the Enterprise, up the Red River. Fulton and Livingston, who claimed the exclusive right to navigate Louisiana waters by steamboat, sued Shreve in the District Court of New Orleans. The judge ruled that the monopoly claimed by the plaintiffs was illegal. That decision, along with a similar outcome in Gibbons v. Ogden, freed navigation on every river, lake or harbor in the United States from interference by monopolies.

When John Quincy Adams became Secretary of State in 1817, one of his highest priorities was to settle with Spain the boundaries of the Louisiana Purchase. He negotiated with Luis de Onís, the Spanish minister to the United States, and finally concluded the Adams–Onis Treaty, also known as the Treaty of 1819. The treaty defined the south bank of the river as the boundary between the United States and Spain, as of when it was surveyed and demarcated following 1819. That boundary continued to be recognized when Mexico gained its independence from Spain in 1821, and ongoingly when Texas became independent from Mexico in 1835–1836. It remained the official boundary until the United States Congress consented in October 2000 to the Red River Boundary Compact, which had been adopted in 1999 by the states of Oklahoma and Texas . This set the jurisdictional boundary between these states at the vegetation line on the south bank, leaving title of adjacent property owners at the south bank. (The Red River actively meanders, as shown by comparing current maps of the political boundaries with those defined by the river's course decades ago.)

The Red River Campaign (March–May 1864) was fought along the Red River Valley in Louisiana during the Civil War. It was part of a failed attempt by the Union to occupy eastern Texas. Confederate commander Richard Taylor succeeded in repelling an army under Nathaniel Banks that was three times bigger than his own.

The area of present-day Natchitoches Parish, Louisiana, was settled by French Creole and mixed-race Louisiana Creole people, starting before 1800. The Cane River National Heritage Area, with plantations and churches founded by Louisiana Creoles, marks this area of influence. Some of the sites are designated as destinations on the Louisiana African American Heritage Trail, established from 2008 onwards.

The area along the lower Red River of Grant Parish, Louisiana, and neighboring parishes has a mixture of hill-country farms and cotton plantations.

=== Great Raft ===
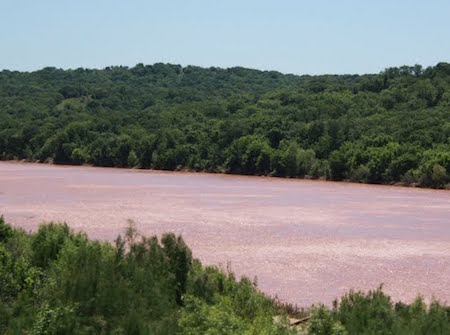
Red River, Texas

In the early 19th century, settlers found that much of the river's length in Louisiana was unnavigable because of a collection of fallen trees that formed a Great Raft over 160 miles (260 km) long. In 1839, Captain Henry Miller Shreve began clearing the log jam, but it was not completely cleared until the 1870s, when dynamite became available. The river was thereafter navigable, although north of Natchitoches it was restricted to small craft. Removal of the raft further connected the Red and Atchafalaya rivers, accelerating the development of the Atchafalaya River channel.

=== "Toll Bridge War" ===
The Red River Bridge War of 1931 was a boundary conflict between Oklahoma and Texas over an existing toll bridge and a new free bridge crossing the Red River. A joint project to build a free bridge between Durant, Oklahoma, and Denison, Texas, turned into a major dispute when the Texas Governor Ross S. Sterling blocked traffic from entering his state on the new bridge. The Red River Bridge Company of Texas owned the original toll bridge and had a dispute over its purchase deal. Oklahoma Governor William H. Murray sent the Oklahoma National Guard to reopen the bridge that July. Texas had to retreat when lawyers determined that Oklahoma had jurisdiction over both banks of the river.

=== 2015 Red River flood ===
In June 2015, the Red River flooded parts of northeast Texas, southwest Arkansas, southeast Oklahoma and Louisiana, from Denison Dam to just south of Alexandria, Louisiana. The river reached its highest level in over 70 years, cresting in most of the affected areas at around 6–9 feet over the flood levels. At 4 PM on June 9, the river reached its maximum height of 37.14 feet.

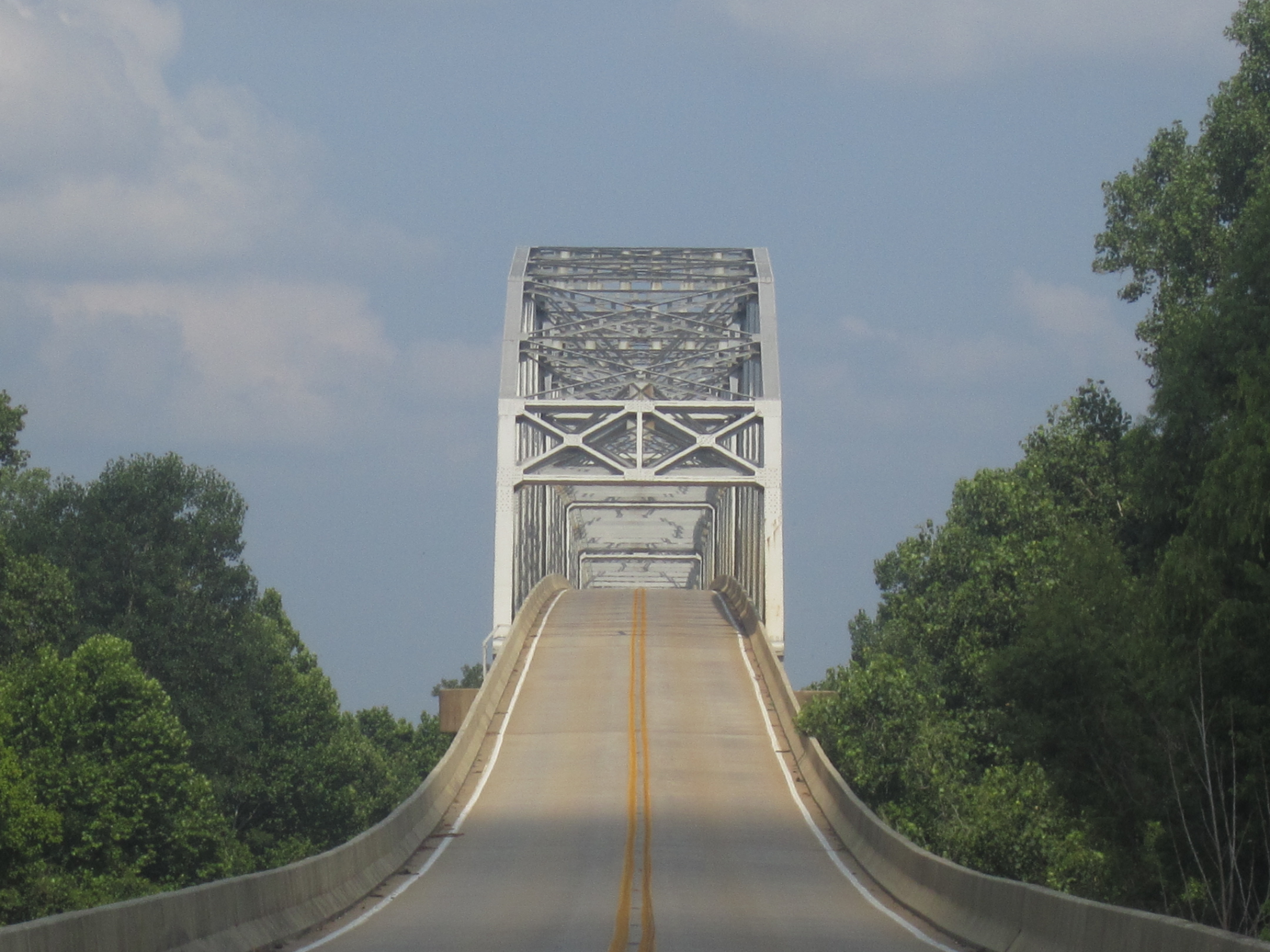
Red River LA 2 Bridge, not the Jimmie Davis Bridge, atop the Red River between Bossier and Caddo parishes near Shreveport

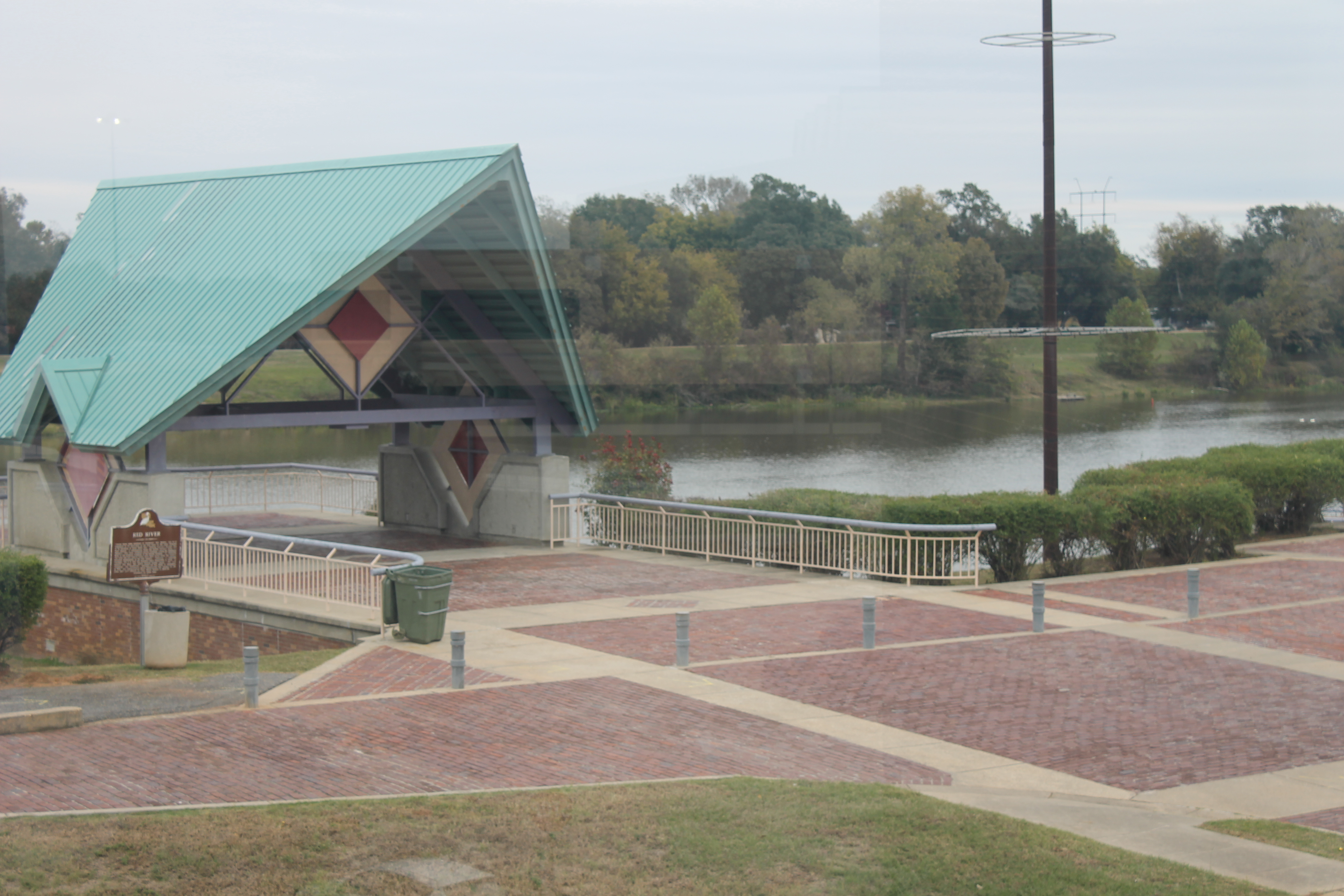
Popular pedestrian walkway along the Red River in Alexandria, Louisiana

== Recreation ==
In 1943, Denison Dam was built on the Red River to form Lake Texoma, a large reservoir of 89,000 acres (360 km^{2}), some 70 miles (110 km) north of Dallas. Other reservoirs on the river's tributaries serve as flood control.

== See also ==
- List of Arkansas rivers
- List of longest main-stem rivers in the United States
- List of Louisiana rivers
- List of Oklahoma rivers
- List of Texas rivers
- Isle Brevelle
- Smokehouse Creek Fire
- Cane River
- Cane River National Heritage Area
- Little Red River (Texas)
- Red River Rivalry
- Adai Caddo Indians of Louisiana
