= Pease River =

Stream in Texas

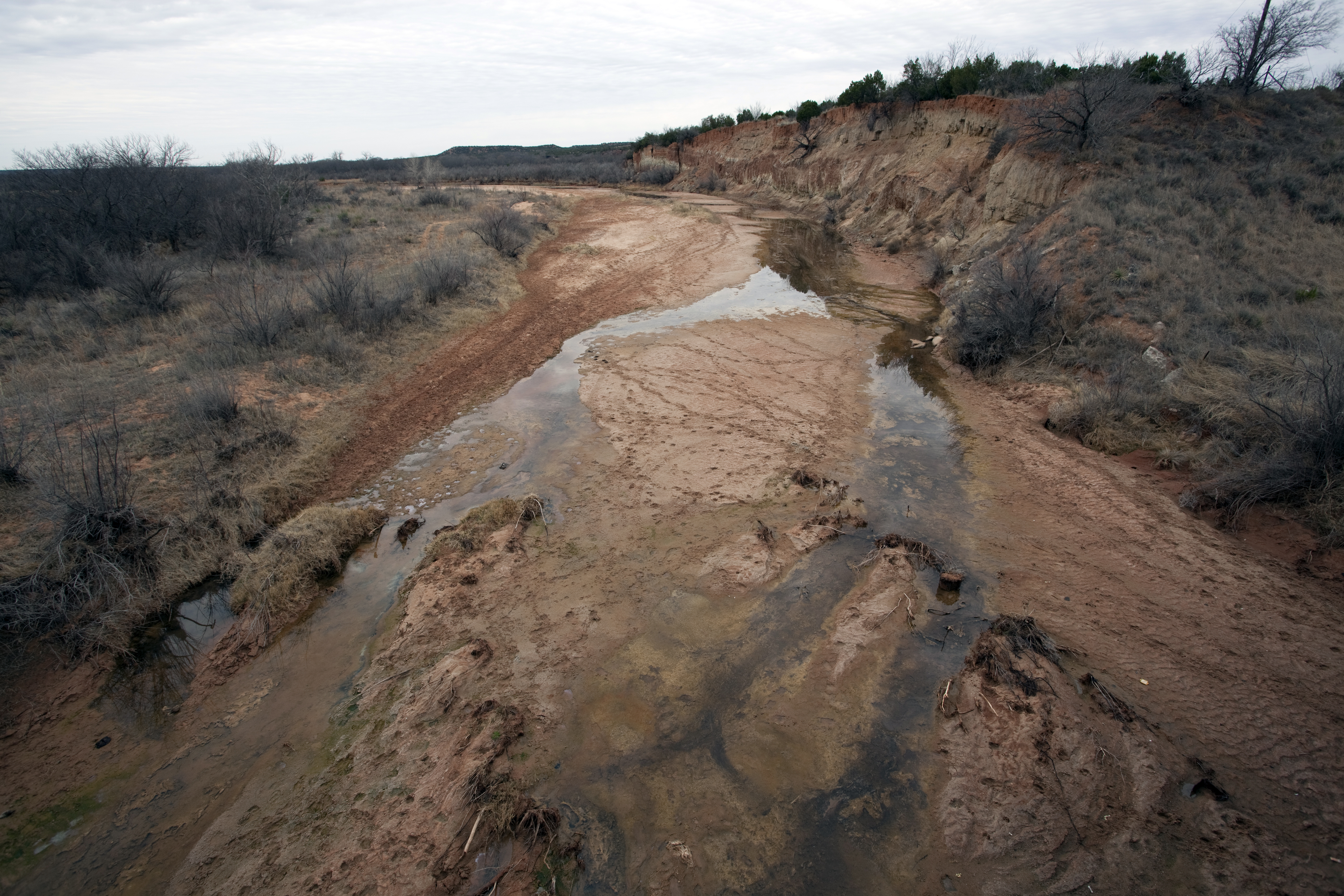
- North Pease River in Cottle County

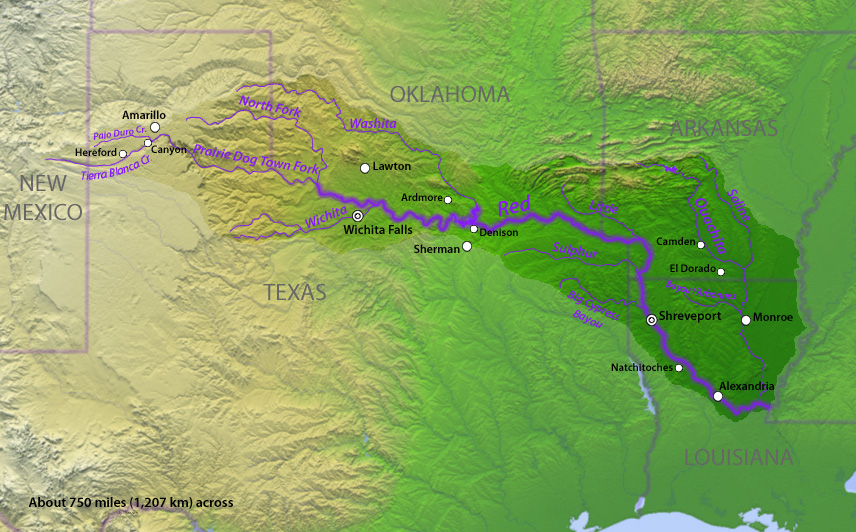
- Map of Red River and tributaries

Location
- Country: United States

Physical characteristics
- Source
  - location: Confluence of North and Middle Pease, Cottle County, Texas
  - coordinates: 34.2389597°N 100.1242754°W
  - elevation: 1,538 ft (469 m)
- Mouth
  - location: Red River, Tillman County, Oklahoma
  - coordinates: 34.2006436°N 99.0297969°W
  - elevation: 1,102 ft (336 m)
- Length: 100 mi (160 km)
- Basin size: 760 sq mi (2,000 km^{2})

Basin features
- River system: Red River

The Pease River is a river in Texas, United States. It is a tributary of the Red River that runs in an easterly direction through West Texas. It was discovered and mapped for the first time in 1856 by Jacob de Córdova, who found the river while surveying for the Galveston, Houston and Henderson Railroad Company; it was named after Texas Governor Elisha M. Pease. In December 1860, the Texas Rangers recaptured Cynthia Ann Parker, kidnapped by the Comanche Indians in 1836, and her daughter from the Comanche at an engagement along the river.

The river begins 20 miles (32 km) northeast of Paducah in northern Cottle County and runs eastward for 100 miles (160 km) to its mouth on the Red River 8 miles (13 km) northeast of Vernon. Its course flows through "flood-prone flat terrain with local shallow depressions, surfaced by sandy and clay loams"; part of it forms the county line between Hardeman and Foard Counties.

The river has three main branches, the North Pease, Middle Pease, and Tongue (or South Pease) Rivers; the beginning of the main river is variously given as where all three branches come together, or where only the North and Middle Pease Rivers intersect. Satellite and topographical imagery, however, clearly shows that the Tongue River empties into the Middle Pease before the latter's meeting with the North Pease.

== North Pease River ==
The North Pease rises 9 miles (14 km) southeast of Cedar Hill on the Caprock Escarpment in eastern Floyd County and runs 60 miles (97 km) through Motley, Hall and Cottle before meeting the Middle Pease River. It begins at 3,100 feet (940 m) and descends over 1,500 feet (460 m), cutting a wide, sandy bed through mostly flat terrain; most of the area through which it passes is remote ranchland.

== Middle Pease River ==
The Middle Pease river rises 8 miles (13 km) northwest of Matador at the confluence of Mott and Boggy creeks in western Motley County; it flows 65 miles (105 km) in an eastward direction before joining the North Pease in northeastern Cottle County. It runs through rolling, isolated, and sparsely populated ranch lands; the only settlement ever established on its banks was the now mostly abandoned ghost town of Tee Pee City. The state has established a 28,000-acre (110 km^{2}) region called the Matador Wildlife Management area along its course in northwestern Cottle County.

== Tongue River ==
The Tongue River, or South Pease River, was named allegedly for a 19th-century disease, called "black tongue", that killed many area buffalo. It rises 11 miles (18 km) west of Roaring Springs in southwestern Motley County, and flows 40 miles (64 km) east and northeast through rugged ranch- and canyonland. The geographic feature of the Roaring Springs (not to be confused with the town), 4 miles (6.4 km) downstream from the river's source, was a popular gathering place for Indians, cowboys, and others. A ranch club is now located near the spring, where State Highway 70 crosses the river.

== See also ==
- Quitaque Creek
- Prairie Dog Town Fork Red River
- Salt Fork Red River
- Double Mountain Fork Brazos River
- Palo Duro Canyon
- Washita River
- Wichita River
- List of rivers of Texas
