= Prairie Dog Town Fork Red River =

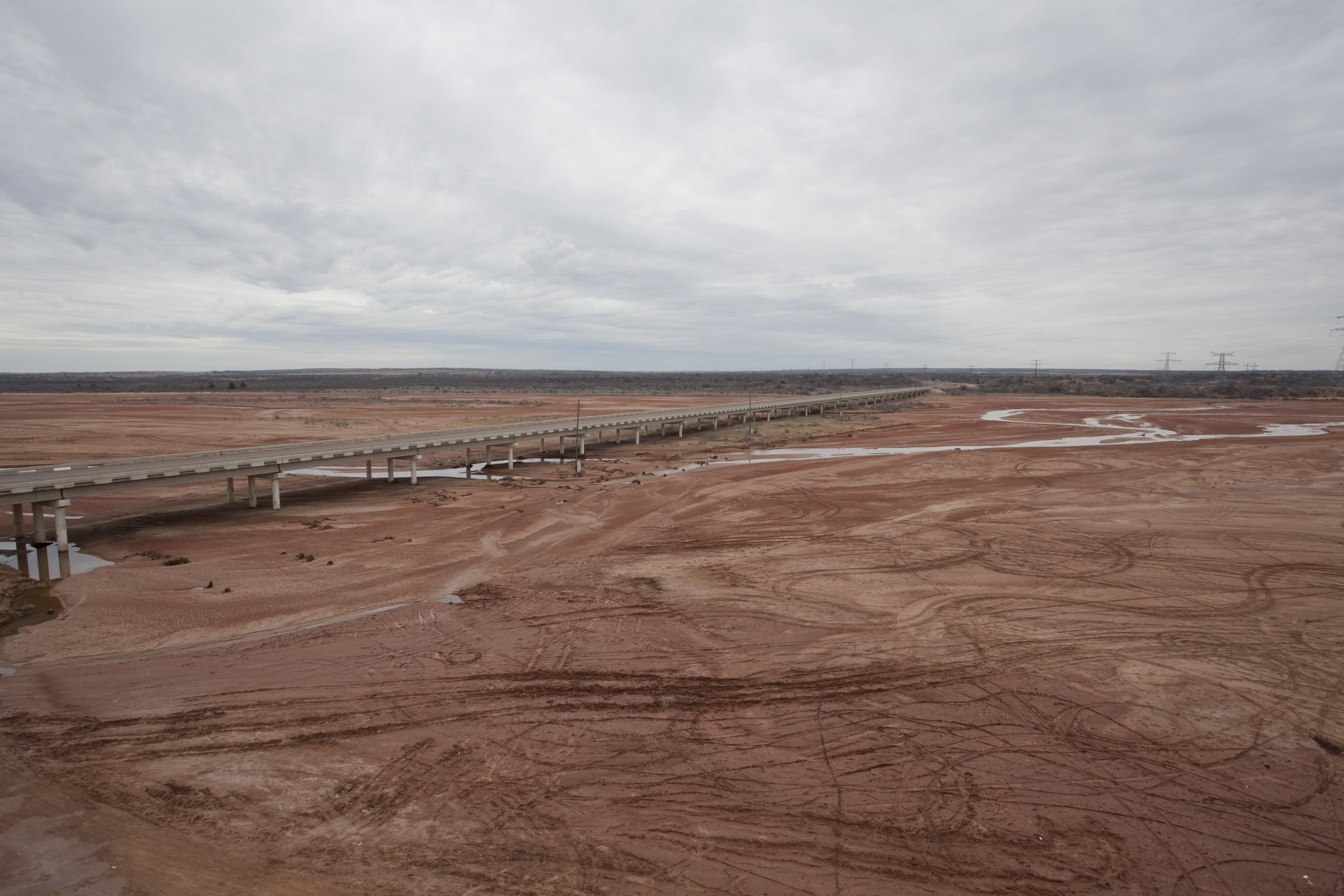
- Prairie Dog Town Fork in Armstrong County
- Map shows Prairie Dog Town Fork Red River (blue) and West Fork Prairie Dog Town Fork Red River (red)
- Native name: Kecheahquehono (Comanche)

Location
- Country: United States

Physical characteristics
- Source
  - location: Randall County, Texas
  - coordinates: 35°00′09″N 101°54′10″W
  - elevation: 3,471 ft (1,058 m)
- Mouth
  - location: Harmon County, Oklahoma
  - coordinates: 34°34′41″N 99°58′00″W
  - elevation: 1,545 ft (471 m)
- Length: 120 mi (190 km)
- Basin size: 7,630 sq mi (19,800 km^{2})

Basin features
- Progression: Red River of the South → Atchafalaya River
- River system: Red River
- Tributaries
  - left: Mulberry Creek
  - right: Little Red River

Prairie Dog Town Fork Red River (from Comanche Ke-che-ah-que-ho-no 'Prairie Dog Town River') is a sandy-braided stream about 120 mi (193 km) long, formed at the confluence of Palo Duro Creek and Tierra Blanca Creek, about 1.8 mi (2.9 km) northeast of Canyon in Randall County, Texas, and flowing east-southeastward to the Red River about 1 mi (2 km) east of the 100th meridian, 8 mi (13 km) south-southwest of Hollis, Oklahoma.

== Geography ==
The Prairie Dog Town Fork Red River is the southernmost of two major forks which form the headwaters of the Red River. It begins as an ephemeral stream on the level surface of the Llano Estacado in Randall County, about 4 mi (6 km) northeast of Canyon, Texas. The stream initially runs northeastward then southeastward across Randall County, flowing through Palo Duro Canyon, where it is fed by springs, providing a base flow that is often increased significantly by runoff from rainstorms. It provides the water for Lake Tanglewood and River Falls prior to flowing through the Palo Duro Canyon State Park. The stream continues in a southeasterly direction through southern Armstrong and northeastern Briscoe County, where it exits Palo Duro Canyon and starts across the rolling red-bed country of central Hall County, where it merges with the Little Red River. The stream continues across Hall and Childress Counties, merging with Buck Creek and forming the Red River proper, 8 mi (13 km) south-southwest of Hollis, Oklahoma. When the Prairie Dog Town Fork crosses the 100th meridian at the eastern edge of Childress County, its south bank becomes the state boundary between Texas and Oklahoma.

== Etymology ==
The name is derived from its Comanche name, Kecheahquehono, which means Prairie Dog Town River. According to a 1959 decision by the United States Board on Geographical Names, this main tributary of the Red River is properly called the Prairie Dog Town Fork Red River, and should not be called the Prairie Dog Town Fork of the Red River, Prairie Dog Town Fork of Red River, or the South Fork of the Red River.

== See also ==
- Adams–Onís Treaty
- Double Mountain Fork Brazos River
- Little Red River (Texas)
- Llano Estacado
- Washita River
- Palo Duro Canyon
- Pease River
- Salt Fork Red River
- List of rivers of Texas
