= Salt Fork Red River =

River in the United States of America

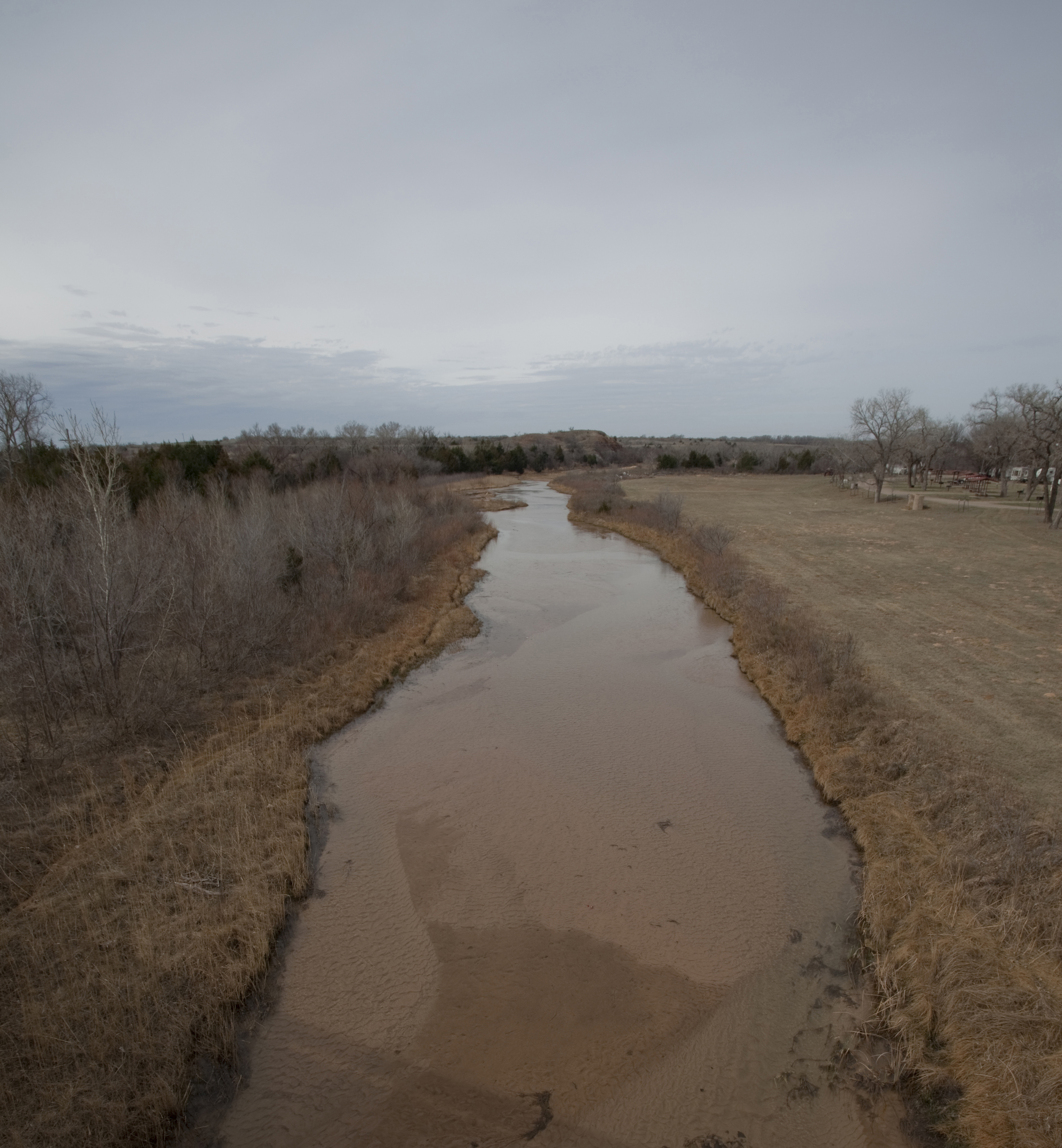
- Salt Fork Red River, Collingsworth County, TX
- Map of Salt Fork Red River

Location
- Country: United States
- States: Texas, Oklahoma

Physical characteristics
- Source: Llano Estacado
  - location: 2.9 km (1.8 mi) north of Claude, Armstrong County, Texas
  - coordinates: 35°09′21″N 101°21′44″W
  - elevation: 1,040 m (3,410 ft)
- Mouth: Confluence Red River
  - location: 21 km (13 mi) south of Altus, Jackson County, Oklahoma
  - coordinates: 34°27′00″N 99°21′01″W
  - elevation: 383 m (1,257 ft)
- Length: 311 km (193 mi)
- Basin size: 5,180 km^{2} (2,000 sq mi)

The Salt Fork Red River is a sandy-braided stream about 311 km (193 mi) long, heading on the Llano Estacado of West Texas about 2.9 km (1.8 mi) north of Claude of Armstrong County, Texas, flowing east across the Texas Panhandle and Western Oklahoma to join the Red River about 21 km (13 mi) south of Altus of Jackson County, Oklahoma.

== Course ==
The Salt Fork Red River rises in northern Armstrong County, Texas just to the south of Carson County, Texas. It flows southeast across Donley and Collingsworth County, Texas. Crossing into Oklahoma at the 100th meridian, it flows through Harmon County and Greer County, Oklahoma. It turns south near Mangum, Oklahoma and flows through central Jackson County, Oklahoma to its confluence with the Red River about 20 miles (32 km) northwest of Vernon, Texas or 21 km (13 mi) south of Altus.

== See also ==
- Double Mountain Fork Brazos River
- Geography of Oklahoma
- List of rivers in Oklahoma
- List of Texas rivers
- Llano Estacado
- Palo Duro Canyon
- Prairie Dog Town Fork Red River
- Salt Fork Brazos River
- Yellow House Canyon
- White River (Texas)
