= U.S. Route 70 in Texas =

Segment of American highway

U.S. Highway 70
- US 70 highlighted in red

Route information
- Maintained by TxDOT
- Length: 253.9 mi (408.6 km)

Major junctions
- West end: US 70 / US 84 at the New Mexico state line in Farwell
- US 84 in Muleshoe; US 385 in Springlake; I-27 / US 87 in Plainview; US 62 in Floydada; SH 70 in Matador; US 62 / US 83 in Paducah; US 287 in Vernon; US 183 / US 283 in Vernon; US 287 in Oklaunion
- East end: US 70 / US 183 at the Oklahoma state line near Oklaunion

Location
- Country: United States
- State: Texas
- Counties: Parmer, Bailey, Lamb, Hale, Floyd, Motley, Cottle, Foard, Wilbarger

Highway system
- United States Numbered Highway System; List; Special; Divided; Highways in Texas; Interstate; US; State; Former; Toll; Loops; Spurs; FM/RM; Park; Rec
← SH 69	→ SH 70

U.S. Route 70 (US 70) is a U.S. Highway that spans from Globe, Arizona to Atlantic, North Carolina. In Texas, it has a portion that begins at the New Mexico state line in Farwell and ends at the Oklahoma state line northeast of Oklaunion.

== Route description ==
US 70 enters Texas at Farwell concurrent with US 84, just after US 60 splits off to the northeast in Texico, New Mexico at the state line. The two routes angle southeast to Muleshoe, where they split. US 70 heads due east, meeting US 385 at Springlake, and has an interchange with Interstate 27/US 87 (I-27/US 87) in Plainview. US 70 then arcs toward the south and becomes concurrent with US 62 in Floydada. The two routes head east to Paducah, where US 62 splits off to the north to join with US 83. US 70 then proceeds to Vernon, where it overlaps US 287 and US 183, and has a junction with US 283. Near Oklaunion, US 70 and US 183 split off to the north to cross the Red River into Oklahoma.

== History ==
The route through Texas was cosigned with State Highway 28 (SH 28) before 1939. SH 28' was designated in 1919 as a route from Muleshoe to Olney with a spur, SH 28A, from SH 28 at Crowell east to the Oklahoma state line. In 1922, the route split in Benjamin, going south to Sagerton and east to Olney. In 1926, The portion from Crowell to Sagerton became SH 51, while the portion from Benjamin to Olney became SH 24. SH 28 was instead rerouted over SH 28A to end at the Oklahoma state line. By 1939, the route was decommissioned in favor of US 70.

== Junction list ==
County	Location	mi	km	Destinations	Notes
Parmer	Farwell	0.0	0.0	US 70 west / US 84 west – Texico, Clovis	Continuation into New Mexico
See US 84
Bailey	Muleshoe	21.8	35.1	US 84 / SH 214 – Lubbock, Littlefield, Morton	Eastern end of US 84 concurrency; western end of SH 214 concurrency; Access to Muleshoe Area Hospital
Bailey	Muleshoe	22.1	35.6	SH 214 – Friona	Eastern end of SH 214 concurrency
Bailey		25.1	40.4	FM 3269 south to US 84	
Lamb		31.3	50.4	FM 2910 south	
Lamb		33.7	54.2	FM 303 – Sudan, Pep	
Lamb	Earth	40.0	64.4	FM 1055 – Amherst, Hereford	
Lamb		43.0	69.2	FM 302 north	
Lamb	Springlake	45.9	73.9	US 385 – Dimmitt, Littlefield	
Lamb	Springlake	46.1	74.2	FM 2080 east	
Lamb	Circle	51.0	82.1	FM 1842 east	
Lamb	Circle	52.2	84.0	FM 1072 south – Fieldton, Bainer	
Lamb	Olton	56.7	91.2	FM 168 north – Hart, Umbarger	Western end of FM 168 concurrency
Lamb	Olton	56.8	91.4	FM 168 south – Spade, Ropesville	Eastern end of FM 168 concurrency
Hale		63.2	101.7	FM 2284 north	
Hale		65.2	104.9	FM 179 south – Cotton Center, Shallowater	Western end of FM 179 concurrency
Hale	Halfway	67.2	108.1	FM 179 north / FM 1070 south	Eastern end of FM 179 concurrency
Hale		71.2	114.6	FM 1424 north – Edmonson	Western end of FM 1424 concurrency
Hale		72.3	116.4	FM 1424 south – Hale Center	Eastern end of FM 1424 concurrency
Hale	Plainview	78.9	127.0	I-27 / US 87 – Lubbock, Amarillo	I-27 exit 49
Hale	Plainview	80.4	129.4	SH 194 west – Hart, Dimmitt	
Hale	Plainview	81.4	131.0	I-27 BL – Abernathy, Kress	Access to Hale County Airport
Hale	Plainview	81.9	131.8	FM 400 – Idalou	
Hale		86.1	138.6	FM 789 south – Petersburg	
Floyd	Aiken	92.7	149.2	FM 2301 north – Wayside	
Floyd		93.7	150.8	FM 2883 west	
Floyd	Lockney	96.1	154.7	FM 97 east – Flomot	
Floyd	Lockney	97.2	156.4	FM 378 south – Lorenzo	Western end of FM 378 concurrency
Floyd	Lockney	97.7	157.2	FM 378 north	Eastern end of FM 378 concurrency
Floyd		102.0	164.2	FM 786	
Floyd	Floydada	108.5	174.6	FM 784 west – Barwise	
Floyd	Floydada	108.9	175.3	US 62 west / SH 207 south – Ralls, Lubbock, Post	Western end of US 62 / SH 207 concurrency
Floyd	Floydada	109.8	176.7	SH 207 north / FM 1958 south – South Plains, Silverton	Eastern end of SH 207 concurrency; access to Floydada Municipal Airport
Floyd		113.8	183.1	FM 651 south – Crosbyton	
Floyd		115.8	186.4	FM 602 north	Western end of FM 602 concurrency
Floyd		116.8	188.0	FM 602 south	Eastern end of FM 602 concurrency
Floyd		122.8	197.6	FM 28 south – Dougherty, Silver Falls Park	Western end of FM 28 concurrency
Floyd		123.3	198.4	FM 28 north	Eastern end of FM 28 concurrency
Motley	Matador	139.5	224.5	SH 70 – Turkey, Clarendon, Roaring Springs, Spur	
Motley	Matador	139.9	225.1	Spur 94 north to FM 94 – Tell, Childress	
Motley		142.7	229.7	FM 1380 to FM 94	
Cottle		168.6	271.3	FM 1037	
Cottle	Paducah	171.0	275.2	US 62 east / US 83 – Abilene, Aspermont, Childress	Eastern end of US 62 concurrency
Cottle		174.8	281.3	FM 104 east – Quanah	
Cottle		182.5	293.7	FM 2564 north	
Foard		197.1	317.2	FM 654 south	
Foard		197.9	318.5	FM 2566 north	
Foard		204.8	329.6	FM 1039 north	
Foard	Crowell	207.3	333.6	SH 6 – Quanah, Benjamin, Knox City	
Foard	Crowell	207.7	334.3	FM 98 – Margaret	
Foard		209.7	337.5	FM 1594 south	
Foard		213.8	344.1	FM 267 south – Munday	
Foard	Thalia	218.0	350.8	FM 262	
Wilbarger		225.0	362.1	FM 98 west – Margaret, Crowell	
Wilbarger		226.8	365.0	FM 1207 south	
Wilbarger	Lockett	228.8	368.2	FM 2073	
Wilbarger	Lockett	230.4	370.8	FM 433 east – Oklaunion	
Wilbarger		234.1	376.7	FM 2073 south – Lockett	
Wilbarger	Vernon	235.5	379.0	Loop 488 east	
Wilbarger	Vernon	236.6	380.8	Bus. US 287 south	Western end of US 287 Bus. concurrency
Wilbarger	Vernon	236.7	380.9	US 287 north / Bus. US 287 – Quanah, Childress, Amarillo	Interchange; eastern end of US 287 Bus. concurrency; western end of US 287 concurrency
Wilbarger	See US 287				
Wilbarger	Oklaunion	247.2	397.8	US 287 south – Wichita Falls, Electra, Fort Worth	Interchange; eastern end of US 287 concurrency
Wilbarger	See US 183				
Red River		253.9	408.6	US 70 east / US 183 north – Davidson, Hobart, Ardmore	Continuation into Oklahoma
1.000 mi = 1.609 km; 1.000 km = 0.621 mi: Concurrency terminus; Incomplete access

U.S. Route 70
Previous state: New Mexico	Texas	Next state: Oklahoma
