= KFLP =

KFLP may refer to:

- KFLP (AM), a radio station (900 AM) licensed to Floydada, Texas, United States
- KFCX, a radio station (106.1 FM) licensed to Floydada, Texas, United States
- Marion County Regional Airport (ICAO code KFLP)
