= Farm to Market Road 400 =

Highway in Texas

Farm to Market Road 400

Route information
- Maintained by TxDOT
- Length: 85.417 mi (Note: The certified length given is shorter than the actual mileage, as the TxDOT description of FM 400 considers it to be discontinuous at US 84 Business in Slaton.) (137.465 km)
- Existed: 1945–present

Major junctions
- South end: Future I-27 / US 87 north of Tahoka
- US 84 in Slaton; US 62 / US 82 / SH 114 east of Idalou; US 70 in Plainview
- North end: FM 145 east of Kress

Location
- Country: United States
- State: Texas
- Counties: Lynn, Lubbock, Hale, Swisher

Highway system
- Highways in Texas; Interstate; US; State; Former; Toll; Loops; Spurs; FM/RM; Park; Rec
← FM 399	→ FM 401

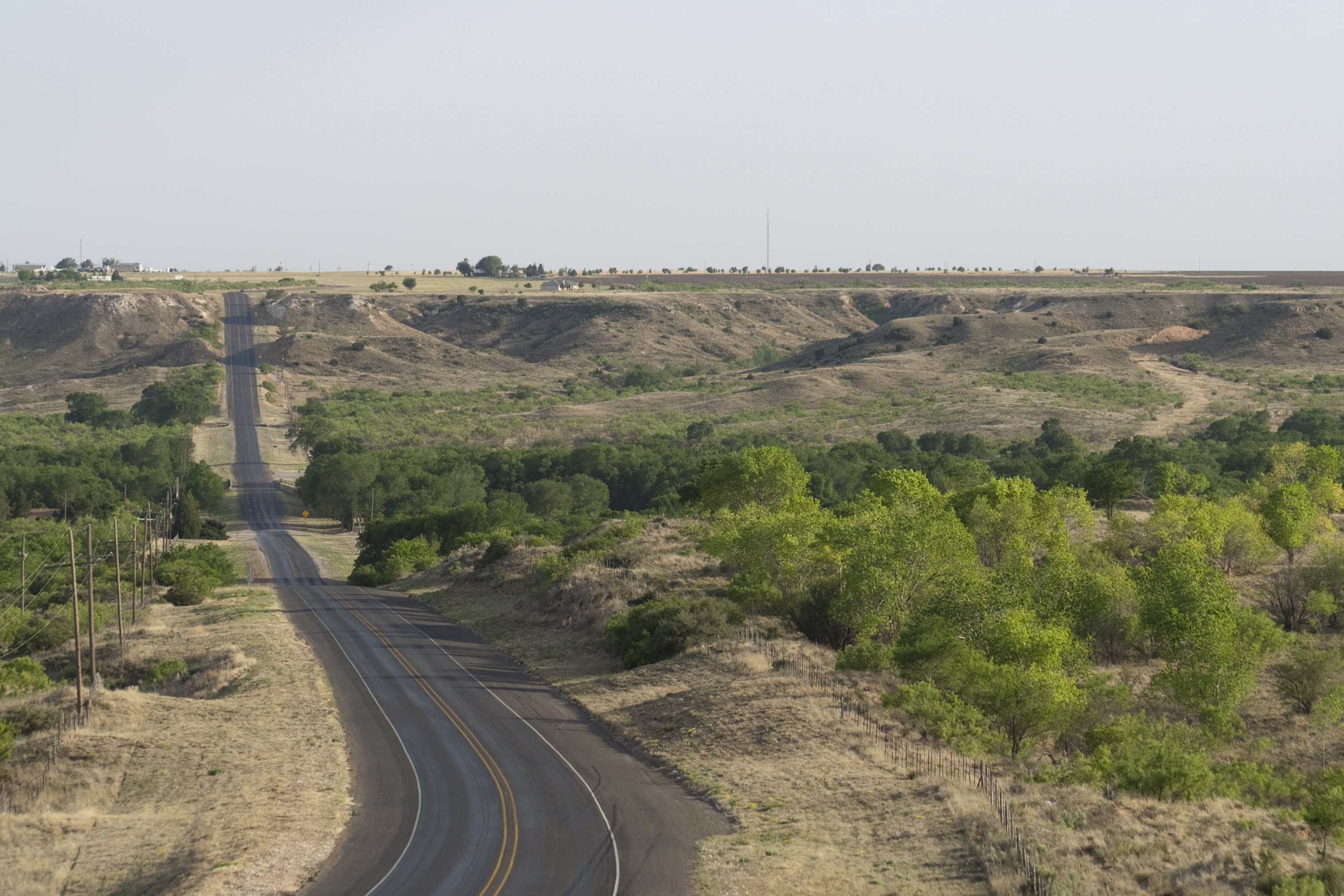
FM 400 passing through Yellow House Canyon of Lubbock County, Texas.

Farm to Market Road 400 (FM 400) is a farm to market road located in Lynn, Lubbock, Hale, and Swisher counties in the Llano Estacado of Texas.

== Route description ==
The southern terminus of FM 400 is at an interchange with US 87 north of the Tahoka city limits. The route travels to the northeast through rural areas of Lynn County, passing to the west of Tahoka Lake and through Wilson along that city's 10th Street before entering Lubbock County. In Slaton, FM 400 turns to the north and crosses US 84 near the southern city limits before entering that city's downtown, where it is concurrent with Bus. US 84 along 9th Street for 2.4 miles (3.9 km). The route leaves Slaton and continues north along Vetch Avenue, passing to the east of Slaton Airport, then descending into and climbing out of Yellow House Canyon, to the east of the community of Ransom Canyon. The next major intersection is just east of Idalou, with US 62 / US 82 / SH 114. Continuing north, FM 400 crosses into Hale County, approximately 9.0 miles (14.5 km) east of Abernathy. It has a concurrency of about 2.0 miles (3.2 km) with FM 37 and passes through the farming community of Happy Union before entering Plainview, where it is known as Date Street. The highway crosses US 70 and then briefly turns to the east along 24th Street before resuming its northward journey. FM 400 has a brief concurrency with FM 788 in northern Hale County; after the two routes separate, FM 400 enters Swisher County, and reaches its northern terminus at FM 145 east of Kress.

== History ==
FM 400 was originally designated on June 25, 1945; its original routing was exclusively in Lubbock County, from Idalou northward to the Hale County line. On July 9 of that same year saw an extension northward, into Hale County and to a junction with FM 54 west of Petersburg. The road was lengthened, this time to the south, on December 16, 1948, from Idalou to a county road just north of the Slaton Airport (12.2 miles (19.6 km) south of Idalou). On March 19, 1949, a southern section of FM 400 was designated, replacing FM 1074. This southern section was in Lynn County, and ran southward from the Lubbock County line through Wilson to US 87. This created a gap in the routing of FM 400 in and around Slaton; this gap would be closed on May 23, 1951, when the two sections of FM 400 were both extended to connect with US 84 at two different points in Slaton. The route was extended northward to Plainview on January 27, 1950. It was extended north to the Hale/Swisher County Line on February 24, 1953, replacing the section of FM 788 from US 70 north to the junction of FM 788 and FM 400; this created the concurrency with FM 788, which TxDOT officially considers a gap in that route's mileage. On October 29, 1953, the road was extended north to FM 145. The route designation was amended in 1965 after the US 84 freeway bypass south of Slaton was constructed; the old location of US 84 was renumbered Loop 251, which would eventually be redesignated as Business US 84 in 1991.

== Major intersections ==
County	Location	mi	km	Destinations	Notes
Lynn		0.0	0.0	Future I-27 / US 87 – Tahoka, Lubbock	Southern terminus
Lynn	Wilson	9.6	15.4	FM 211 – New Home	
Lubbock	Slaton	18.3	29.5	US 84 – Lubbock, Post	
Lubbock	Slaton	18.6	29.9	Bus. US 84 south to FM 2150	South end of US 84 Bus. concurrency
Lubbock	Slaton	19.4	31.2	FM 41 (W Division St.)	
Lubbock	Slaton	21.0	33.8	Bus. US 84 north	North end of US 84 Bus. concurrency
Lubbock		27.4	44.1	FM 3523	
Lubbock		30.7	49.4	FM 40 – Acuff	
Lubbock		35.9	57.8	US 62 / US 82 / SH 114 – Idalou, Ralls	
Lubbock		46.0	74.0	FM 597 – Abernathy	
Hale		50.7	81.6	FM 54 – Petersburg	
Hale		55.7	89.6	FM 37 east	South end of FM 37 concurrency
Hale		57.7	92.9	FM 37 west	North end of FM 37 concurrency
Hale	Happy Union	60.7	97.7	FM 784	
Hale		63.7	102.5	FM 1914 – Hale Center	
Hale		65.7	105.7	FM 2883	
Hale	Plainview	71.4	114.9	FM 3466	
Hale	Plainview	72.0	115.9	US 70 – Muleshoe, Floydada	
Hale	Plainview	72.9	117.3	FM 2286 (E 16th St.)	
Hale		75.8	122.0	FM 1767 (E 34th St.) – Seth Ward	
Hale		77.8	125.2	FM 3183	
Hale		78.3	126.0	FM 788 east – Providence	South end of FM 788 concurrency
Swisher		79.9	128.6	FM 788 west	North end of FM 788 concurrency
Swisher		87.7	141.1	FM 145 – Kress	Northern terminus
1.000 mi = 1.609 km; 1.000 km = 0.621 mi

== See also ==
- Becton, Texas
- Farm to Market Road 669
- Heckville, Texas
- Idalou, Texas
