= Bill Kelley (American football) =

American football player (1926–2015)

No. 26, 46
- Position: Tight end

Personal information
- Born: August 23, 1926; Becton, Texas, U.S.
- Died: October 2, 2015 (aged 89); Arlington, Texas, U.S.
- Listed height: 6 ft 2 in (1.88 m)
- Listed weight: 195 lb (88 kg)

Career information
- High school: Idalou (Idalou, Texas)
- College: Texas Tech
- NFL draft: 1949: 23rd round, 223rd overall pick

Career history
- Green Bay Packers (1949); Winnipeg Blue Bombers (1950)

Career NFL statistics
- Receptions: 17
- Receiving yards: 222
- Touchdowns: 1
- Stats at Pro Football Reference

Billie Rex Kelley (August 23, 1926 – October 2, 2015) was an American professional football player in the National Football League (NFL) who played tight end for the Green Bay Packers. Kelley played college football for Texas Technological College (now Texas Tech University) before being drafted 223rd overall by the Green Bay Packers in the 23rd round of the 1949 NFL draft. He played professionally for one season, in 1949, recording 17 catches for 222 yards and one touchdown. Kelley died in Arlington, Texas, in 2015.
