= Allmon, Texas =

Unincorporated community in Texas, US

Allmon
- Unincorporated community
- Location in Texas
- Coordinates: 33.8814695°N 101.5132186°W
- Country: United States
- State: Texas
- County: Floyd
- Elevation: 3,209 ft (978 m)

Allmon is an unincorporated community in Floyd County, Texas, United States. Situated on Farm to Market Road 54 and 378, it is named for the Charles L. Allmon family. Its school was established in 1909 or 1910, being consolidated by Petersburg Independent School District c. 1935. The community declined since the 1950s, and as of 2000, the population is 24.
