= Dougherty, Floyd County, Texas =

Dougherty, Texas
- Unincorporated community
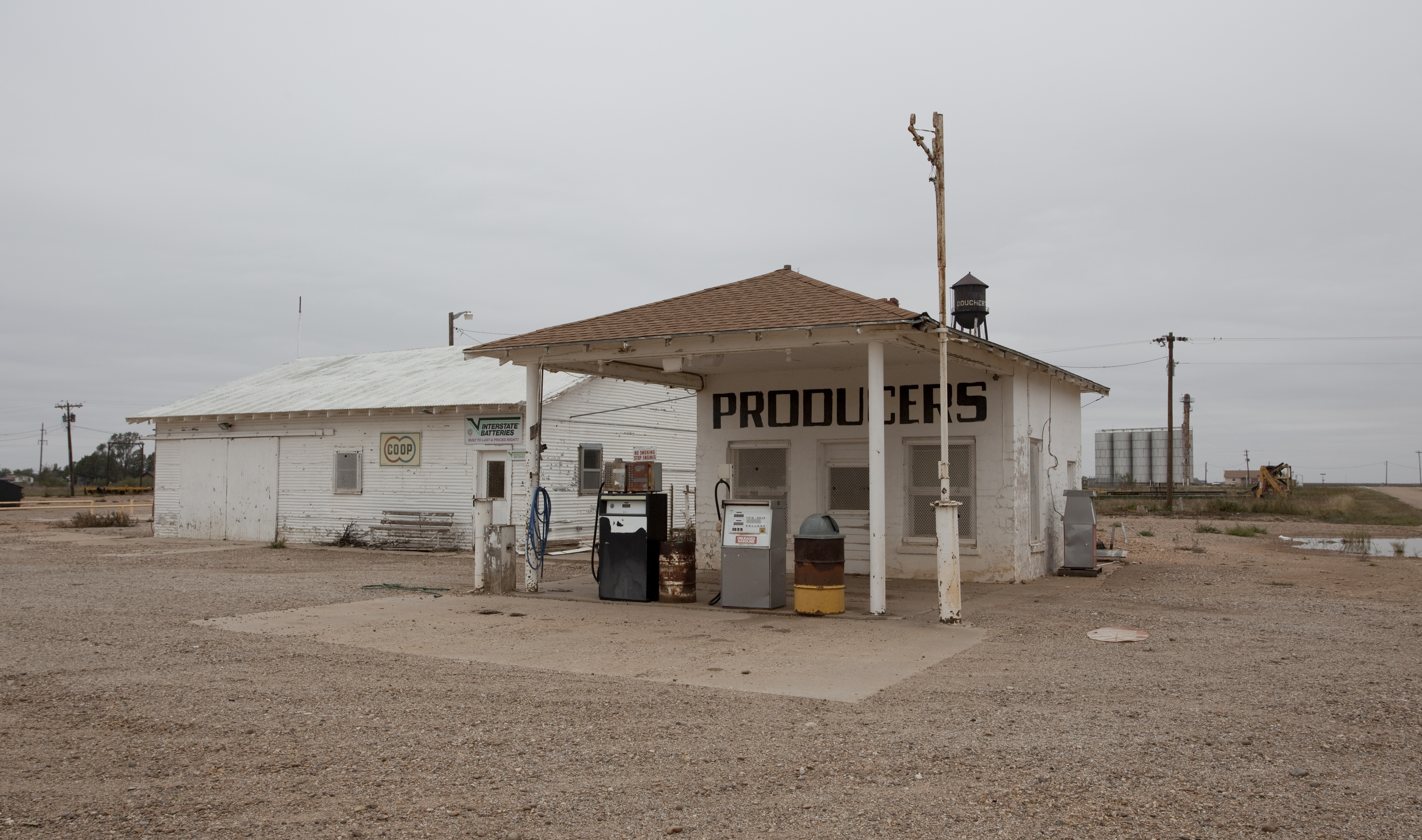
- Gas station in Dougherty

- Location within Texas Location within the United States
- Coordinates: 33°56′30″N 101°05′12″W
- Country: United States
- State: Texas
- County: Floyd
- Region: Llano Estacado
- Elevation: 3,077 ft (938 m)

Population (2000)
  - Total: 109
- Time zone: UTC-6 (Central (CST))
  - Summer (DST): UTC-5 (CDT)
- Area code: 806
- GNIS feature ID: 1356209
- Website: Handbook of Texas

Dougherty (formerly Doughtery) is a small unincorporated community in Floyd County, Texas, United States.

== History ==
Dougherty was established in 1928 and named for Francis M. Dougherty. A school was built in 1929.

== Geography ==
Dougherty is located on the high plains of the Llano Estacado in West Texas. It lies at an elevation of 3,077 ft (938 m).

== Education ==
It is within the Floydada Independent School District. The Dougherty Independent School District consolidated into the former on July 1, 1987.

== See also ==
- Becton, Texas
- Estacado, Texas
- Heckville, Texas
- Blanco Canyon
- Mount Blanco
- White River (Texas)
