= South Plains Wind Farm =

Wind farm in Texas, USA

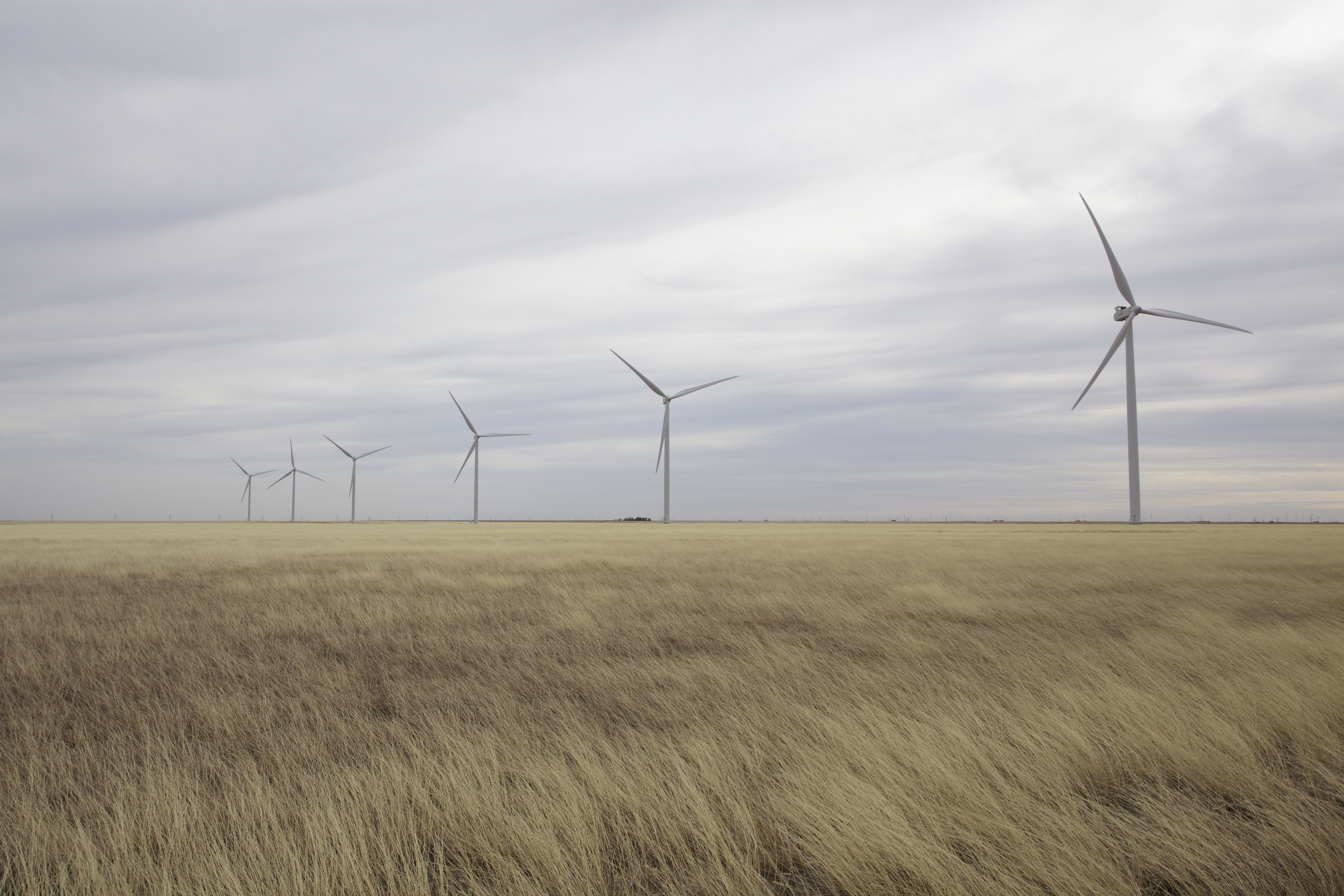
- View of the western edge of South Plains Wind Farm
- Country: United States
- Location: Floyd County, Texas
- Coordinates: 34°11′07″N 101°22′18″W
- Construction began: Spring 2015
- Commission date: November 2015 (Phase I); April 2016 (Phase II)
- Owners: TerraForm Power (Phase I); Novatus Energy (Phase II)
- Operators: TerraForm Power (Phase I); E.ON Energy Services (Phase II)

Power generation
- Units operational: 191 turbines
- Make and model: Vestas V100 2.0 MW; Vestas V117 3.3 MW
- Nameplate capacity: 500.3 MW
- Capacity factor: 45.2% (average 2018-)
- Annual net output: 1,980 GW·h

The South Plains Wind Farm, is located between Floydada, Texas and South Plains, Texas, on the high plains of the Llano Estacado in Floyd County. Completed in 2016, the wind farm was constructed in two phases that have a total generating capacity of 500.3 megawatts (MW).

== Details ==
The project was conceived and developed by Westerly Wind and purchased by First Wind in June 2014. First Wind was subsequently acquired by SunEdison in November 2014. SunEdison financed the construction and selected Mortenson Construction to provide EPC services. In addition to erecting the wind turbines, each phase required the construction of new access roads, turbine foundations, collection lines, 345 kV electrical substation, and operations & maintenance building.

Phase I includes 100 Vestas V100 turbines, each rated at 2 MW, that collectively are capable of generating 200 MW. These turbines have a hub height of 80 meters and a blade rotor diameter of 100 meters. Construction began in spring of 2015 and the project was completed in November of the same year. The electricity produced annually is sufficient to service approximately 60,000 households.

Phase II includes 91 Vestas V117 turbines rated at 3.3 MW than can collectively generate 300.3 MW. These more powerful turbines were the first of their kind to be installed in the United States, and have a hub height of 91.5 meters and a blade rotor diameter of 117 meters. Construction began in July 2015 and completed in early 2016. The electricity produced can service approximately 90,000 homes.

Hewlett Packard helped to enable construction of phase II by purchasing 112 MW of the power to supply its data centers in Texas with 100% renewable energy. The remaining 188 MW is contracted to an affiliate of Citi.

== Electricity production ==
South Plains Wind electricity generation (MW·h)
Year	South Plains I (200 MW)	South Plains II (300.3 MW)	Total annual MW·h
2015	24,141*	-	24,141
2016	818,301	672,154*	1,490,455
2017	ID	1,097,241	-
2018	825,730	1,154,432	1,980,162
Average annual production (years 2018–) --->			1,980,162
Average capacity factor (years 2018-) --->			45.2%

(*) partial year of operation
(ID) incomplete dataset

== See also ==
- Wind power in Texas
- South Plains
- List of wind farms in the United States
