= Heckville, Texas =

- Unincorporated community
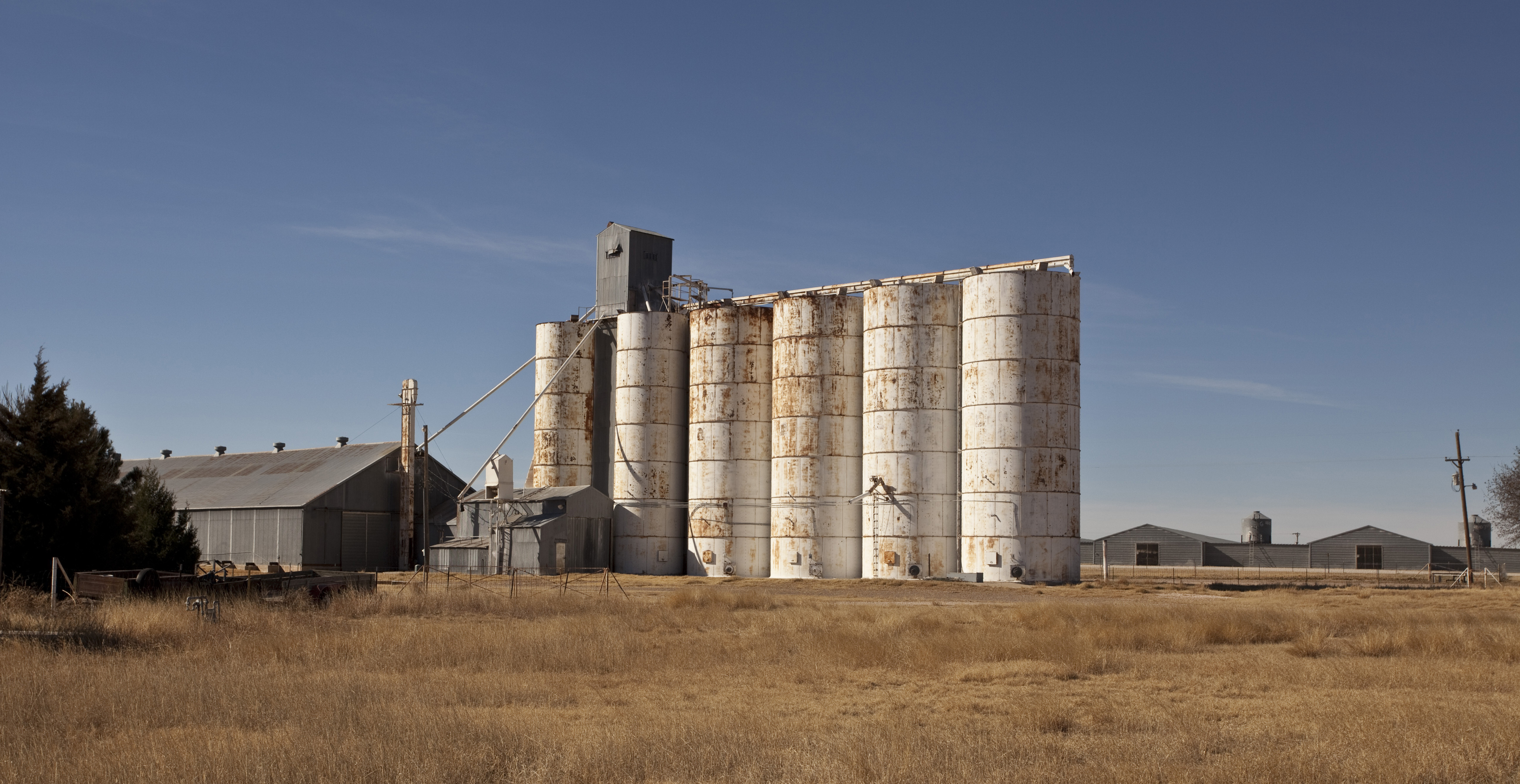
- Steel grain elevator alongside the abandoned tracks of the former Fort Worth and Denver South Plains Railway

- Location within Texas Location within the United States
- Coordinates: 33°45′17″N 101°39′55″W
- Country: United States
- State: Texas
- County: Lubbock
- Region: Llano Estacado
- Established: 1948
- Elevation: 3,245 ft (989 m)
- Time zone: UTC-6 (CST)
- ZIP Code: 79329
- Area code: 806
- Website: Handbook of Texas

Heckville is an unincorporated community located on the high plains of the Llano Estacado, approximately 16 mi (26 km) northeast of Lubbock or 7 mi (11 km) north of Idalou in northeastern Lubbock County, Texas, United States. This small town was named after Henry Heck, who built a cotton gin to serve the community in 1948.

Heckville is located at the point where Farm to Market Road 400 intersects the tracks of the former Fort Worth and Denver South Plains Railway that extended from Estelline to Lubbock. The BNSF Railway, which last owned and operated the former Fort Worth and Denver South Plains Railway, abandoned and permanently removed the tracks in 1989.

The community has never reported a population of more than 20. As of 2010, all that remained were rusting grain elevators, numerous large warehouses, the remnants of a cotton gin, an abandoned country store, and a large and still active egg farm operation that produces 180,000 eggs per day.

== See also ==
- Becton, Texas
- Estacado, Texas
- Llano Estacado
- Mount Blanco
- West Texas
