= South Texas plains =

South Texas plains may refer to

- South Texas region of the U.S. state of Texas
- Tamaulipan mezquital an ecoregion in the southern United States and northeastern Mexico
- South Plains a region in West Texas
- South Plains, Texas a community in northern Floyd County, Texas
