= Gary Gaines =

American football coach (1949–2022)

Biographical details
- Born: May 4, 1949; Crane, Texas, U.S.
- Died: August 22, 2022 (aged 73); Lubbock, Texas, U.S.

Playing career
- 1968–1970: Angelo State
- Position: Quarterback

Coaching career (HC unless noted)
- 1976-1977: Petersburg HS (TX)
- 1978: Denver City HS (TX)
- 1982: Tascosa HS (TX)
- 1983–1985: Monahans HS (TX)
- 1986–1989: Odessa Permian HS (TX)
- 1990–1993: Texas Tech (LB)
- 1994–1995: Abilene HS (TX)
- 1996–1999: San Angelo Central HS (TX)
- 2000–2004: Abilene Christian
- 2009–2012: Odessa Permian HS (TX)

Head coaching record
- Overall: 21–30 (college); 127–93–5 (high school)

Accomplishments and honors

Championships
- 1 High School National (1989); 1 Texas 5A (1989); 1 LSC South Division (2002)

Awards
- Texas High School Hall of Fame

Gary Gaines (May 4, 1949 – August 22, 2022) was an American football coach. Gaines was the head coach of the 1988 Permian High School football team, which was the focus of Buzz Bissinger's book Friday Night Lights: A Town, a Team, and a Dream and the 2004 motion picture Friday Night Lights starring Billy Bob Thornton. His coaching career spanned four decades, coaching at eight high schools and two colleges, all in Texas.

== Early life ==
Gaines was born in Crane, Texas. He played quarterback at Angelo State University from 1967 through 1970, earning letters during all four years.

== Coaching career ==
Gaines spent 30 seasons coaching high school in West Texas at different high schools. His career started at Fort Stockton High School in 1971, followed by four years at Monahans High School. His first head coaching job came in 1976 at Petersburg High School. He would go on to be a head coach at Denver City High School (1978), Amarillo Tascosa High School (1982), Monahans (1983–1985), Abilene High School (1994–1995) and San Angelo Central High School (1996–1999).

=== Odessa Permian ===
Gaines received his most recognition from his time at Permian High School in Odessa, Texas. He spent three years as an assistant coach under Head Coach John Wilkins from 1979 through the 1981 season. With Gaines on staff, Permian won the Texas 5A state championship in 1980.

Following Wilkins' retirement after the 1985 season, Gaines returned to Permian as head coach, taking over a team that had reached the Class 5A state championship game in both 1984 (a 21–21 tie and co-championship with Beaumont French High School) and 1985 (a 37–0 loss to Houston Yates High School).

Gaines was one of the featured characters in H.G. Bissinger's 1990 book Friday Night Lights: A Town, a Team, and a Dream, which chronicled Permian's 1988 season and the football-crazed culture of West Texas. The following season, Gaines coached Permian to a perfect undefeated 16–0 season and the 1989 5A state championship. Gaines left Permian following the 1989 season, compiling a 46–7–1 record.

=== College coaching ===
Following the 1989 season, Gaines accepted his first college coaching job, getting hired as the linebackers coach at Texas Tech University under head coach Spike Dykes. (Dykes was the head coach of Permian rival Midland Lee High School when Gaines was an assistant at Permian in the early 1980s.) In his five seasons at Tech, the Red Raiders had a record of 27–30 and appeared in two bowl games, including the 1995 Cotton Bowl Classic. Following the 1994 season, Gaines left Texas Tech and became the head coach at Abilene High School from 1994 to 1995 and at Central High School from 1996 to 1999.

Gaines was named the 17th head football coach at Abilene Christian University (ACU) in Abilene, Texas, in January 2000. In his first two seasons, ACU struggled under Gaines, losing 17 of 21 games. Despite the early struggles, the Wildcats rebounded in 2002, posting a winning record at 6–4 and winning the Lone Star Conference South Division Championship, the Wildcats' first championship of any kind since their only Lone Star Conference Championship in 1977. Gaines resigned at the conclusion of the 2004 season with an overall record of 21–30.

=== Return to Permian ===
On March 9, 2009, Permian announced that Gaines would return as head coach of Permian after Darren Allman left for Austin Westlake. It had been 20 years since Gaines left Permian and 10 years since he had coached high school football. The Panthers were not able to recreate the success Gaines had in the 1980s, compiling a 23–21 record over four seasons with just one playoff victory. At the conclusion of the 2012 season, Gaines resigned as head coach and announced his retirement from coaching. In eight total seasons at Permian, Gaines compiled a 69–28–1 record and an overall record of 127–93–5 in 20 seasons as a head coach.

== Post-coaching career ==
In 2005, Gaines moved on to serve as the athletic director for Ector County Independent School District, the same district of which Permian High School is a part. In 2007, he took the position of athletic director for the Lubbock Independent School District.

Gaines was also a public speaker. Speaking to high schools and colleges across the country, Gaines gave insight on teamwork, leadership, winning and success on and off the field.

== Personal life and death ==
Gaines was married to Sharon Gaines, and the couple had two children and five grandchildren.

Gaines was inducted into the Texas High School Coaches Association Hall of Honor in 2013 and the Angelo State University Hall of Honor in 2019.

In 2017, Gaines announced that he had been diagnosed with early-onset Alzheimer's disease. Gaines died from the disease on August 22, 2022, at the age of 73.

== Head coaching record ==
=== College ===
Year	Team	Overall	Conference	Standing	Bowl/playoffs
Abilene Christian Wildcats (Lone Star Conference) (2000–2004)
2000	Abilene Christian	1–9	1–7 / 1–5	12th / 7th (South)	
2001	Abilene Christian	3–8	3–6 / 2–4	9th / T–5th (South)	
2002	Abilene Christian	6–4	6–2 / 5–1	T–2nd / T–1st (South)	
2003	Abilene Christian	6–4	5–3 / 5–1	6th / 2nd (South)	
2004	Abilene Christian	5–5	5–4 / 3–3	T–6th / 4th (South)	
Abilene Christian:		21–30	20–22		
Total:		21–30			
National championship Conference title Conference division title or championship game berth

== See also ==
- List of teachers portrayed in films
