= Barwise, Texas =

- Unincorporated community
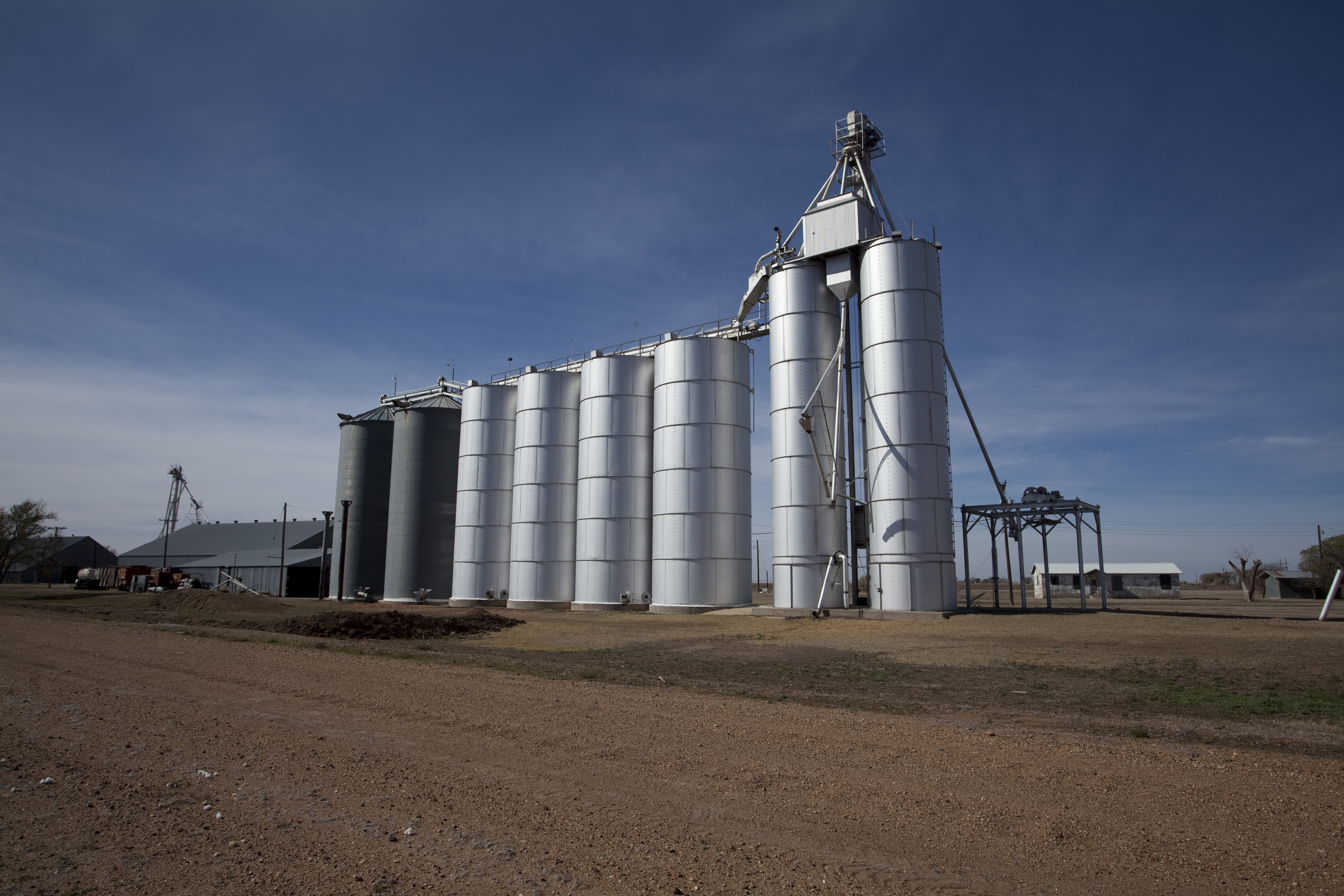
- Steel grain elevator alongside a dirt road that marks the former path of the Fort Worth and Denver South Plains Railway

- Location within Texas Location within the United States
- Coordinates: 33°59′50″N 101°31′36″W
- Country: United States
- State: Texas
- County: Floyd
- Region: Llano Estacado
- Established: 1928
- Elevation: 3,245 ft (989 m)
- Time zone: UTC-6 (CST)
- ZIP Code: 79235
- Area code: 806
- Website: Handbook of Texas

Barwise is a small, unincorporated community located on the level plains of the Llano Estacado about 10 mi (16 km) west of Floydada in western Floyd County, Texas. The town was founded in 1928 after the Fort Worth and Denver South Plains Railway Company laid tracks through the area. The rail spur that passes through Barwise extended from the Fort Worth and Denver Railway junction at Estelline to Lubbock and Plainview.

According to the Handbook of Texas, the town of Barwise was originally named after J. W. Stringer, a local farmer and the owner of the original town site. When it was discovered that another Texas town was already named Stringer, the name had to be changed. Some residents wanted to name the town “Granary,” but the final designation became Barwise, named after Judge Joseph Hodson Barwise of Wichita Falls. As the story goes, Judge Barwise, who served as the Assistant General Attorney for the Fort Worth and Denver City Railway Company from 1902 to 1906 and later became a member of the board of directors, was the first person off the train to register at the local hotel.

Barwise was never very large. Originally the town covered several city blocks and by the 1930s it had a hotel, a general store, a fertilizer dealer, a fueling station, a cotton gin, and two grain elevators. By the 1940s, the population was only 25 and the 1986–87 Texas Almanac listed a population of only 30. The 1990 population was still reported as 30, but in 2000 it dropped to 16.

With improvements in state highways and the paving of many of the farm to market roads across West Texas, railroads became less important for shipping agricultural products and for general passenger travel. Farm to Market Road 784 reached Barwise in the late 1950s providing additional transportation opportunities. BNSF Railway, which last owned and operated the former Fort Worth and Denver South Plains Railway, abandoned the tracks in 1989. Today, the Barwise grain elevator and cotton gin have no rail service.

== See also ==
- Becton, Texas
- Estacado, Texas
- Heckville, Texas
- Blanco Canyon
- Mount Blanco
- White River (Texas)
