= Bradley Adkins =

American track and field athlete (born 1993)

Brad Adkins
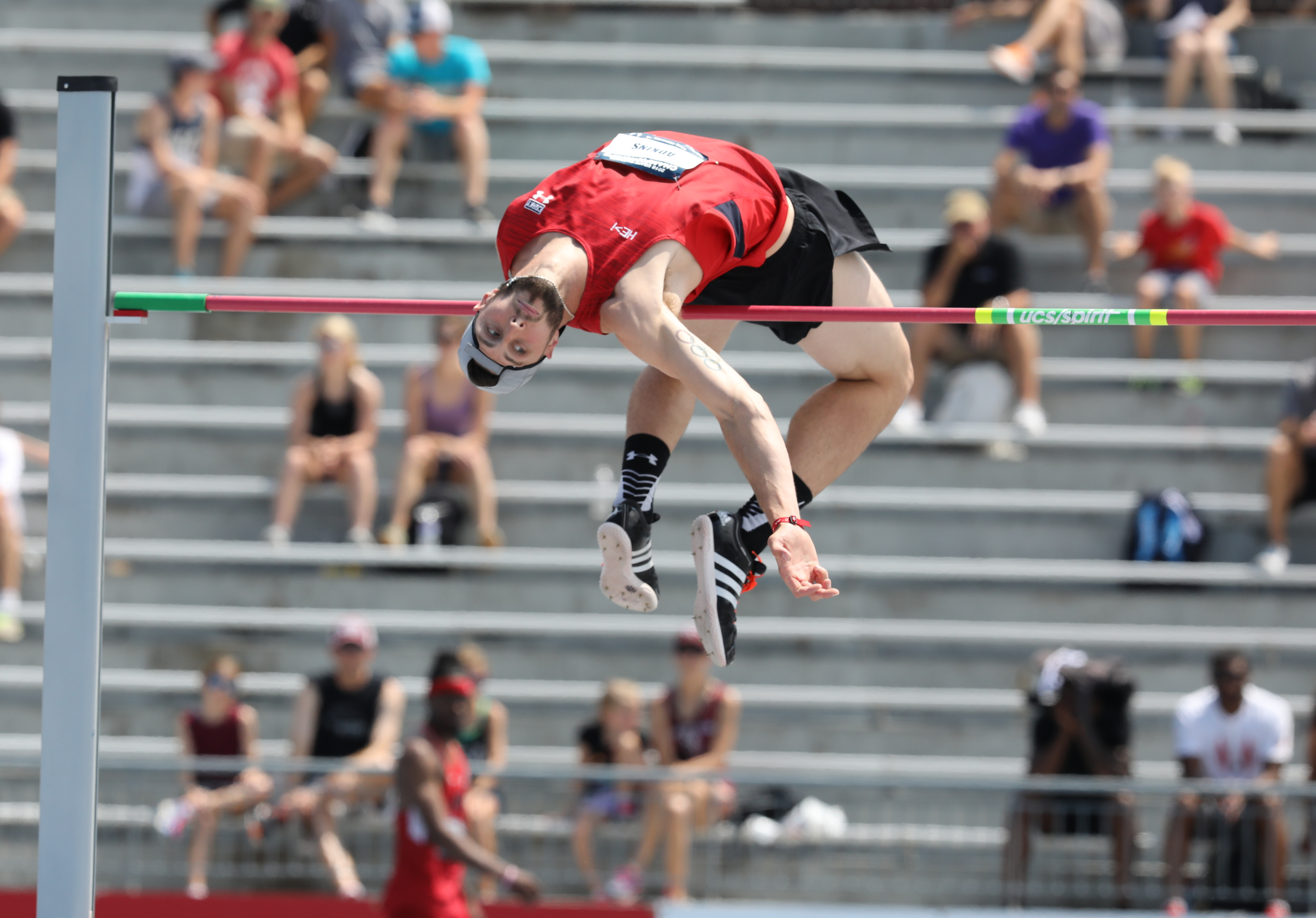
- Adkins at the 2018 USA Outdoor Track and Field Championships

Personal information
- Full name: Bradley Don Adkins
- Born: December 30, 1993 (age 32) Lubbock, Texas, U.S.
- Home town: Idalou, Texas, U.S.
- Height: 6 ft 3 in (191 cm)

Sport
- Country: United States
- Sport: Track and field
- Event: High Jump
- College team: Texas Tech

Bradley Don Adkins (born December 30, 1993), is an American track and field athlete who competes in the high jump.

== Early life ==
Adkins attended Idalou High School where he lettered four years in the high jump, long jump, triple jump, and hurdles. He was named the 2A Athlete of the Year in Texas during both the 2010 and 2011 season. He also played football and basketball winning state championships in both sports.

== College career ==
Adkins was the 2014 Outdoor High Jump Champion in the NCAA Big 12 Conference.

In February 2016, Adkins was named the Big 12 Men's Track & Field Athlete of the week after a strong performance in Albuquerque. It was his first weekly honor.

In July 2016, Adkins had a third-place finish in the high jump at the US Olympic Trials which automatically earned him a trip to the 2016 Olympic Games in Rio de Janeiro. He became the first Red Raider to compete at the Olympic Games in the high jump.

== Personal life ==
He is the son of Shannon and Beverly Adkins. He has two brothers. His father is a third-generation cotton farmer and planted his first farm in 1991.

He joined Fellowship of Christian Athletes at the start of 2020 where he was an Area Representative. His focus was serving middle school campuses around Lubbock. Additionally, he served as a Chaplain at Texas Tech University.
