= Idalou High School =

Location
- 601 S Walnut St. Idalou, Texas 79329; United States

Information
- School type: Public high school
- School district: Idalou Independent School District
- Principal: Jerry Estrada
- Teaching staff: 31.62 (FTE)
- Grades: 9-12
- Enrollment: 297 (2024-2025)
- Student to teacher ratio: 9.39
- Colors: Green & Gold
- Athletics conference: UIL Class 3A
- Mascot: Wildcat
- Website: Idalou High School

Idalou High School is a public high school located in the city of Idalou, USA and classified as a 3A school by the UIL. It is a part of the Idalou Independent School District located in eastern Lubbock County. In 2015, the school was rated "Met Standard" by the Texas Education Agency.

== Athletics ==
The Idalou Wildcats compete in these sports -

Cross Country, Football, Basketball, Golf, Tennis, Track, Baseball & Softball

=== State titles ===
- Boys Basketball -
  - 2011(2A)
- Football -
  - 2010(2A/D2)

==== State Finalist ====
- Boys Basketball -
  - 2010(2A)

==== State Semi-Finalist ====
- Girls Basketball
  - 2022(3A)

== Notable alumni ==
- Bradley Adkins, track and field athlete who competes in the high jump
