= Aiken, Floyd County, Texas =

- Unincorporated community
- Location within the state of Texas Aiken (the United States)
- Coordinates: 34°8′32″N 101°31′33″W
- Country: United States
- State: Texas
- County: Floyd
- Elevation: 3,300 ft (1,000 m)
- Time zone: UTC-6 (Central (CST))
  - Summer (DST): UTC-5 (CDT)
- ZIP codes: 79221
- GNIS feature ID: 1379324

Aiken is an unincorporated community in western Floyd County, Texas, United States. It lies along U.S. Route 70 north of the city of Floydada, the county seat of Floyd County. Its elevation is 3,300 feet (1,006 m). Although Aiken is unincorporated, it has a post office, with the ZIP code of 79221.

Aiken was founded by landowner Frank Aiken, who built the community along the Santa Fe Railway and had a post office established in August 1922.
