= Lockett, Texas =

- Census-designated place
- Location within Texas Location within the United States
- Coordinates: 34°04′57″N 99°22′26″W
- Country: United States
- State: Texas
- County: Wilbarger

Area
  - Total: 3.00 sq mi (7.78 km^{2})
  - Land: 3.00 sq mi (7.78 km^{2})
  - Water: 0 sq mi (0.0 km^{2})
- Elevation: 1,293 ft (394 m)
- Time zone: UTC-6 (Central (CST))
  - Summer (DST): UTC-5 (CDT)
- ZIP Code: 76384 (Vernon)
- Area code: 940
- FIPS code: 47-43216
- GNIS feature ID: 2805851

Lockett is an unincorporated community and census-designated place (CDP) in Wilbarger County, Texas, United States. As of the 2020 census, Lockett had a population of 173. It was first listed as a CDP prior to the 2020 census.

It is in the western part of the county, along U.S. Route 70, which leads northeast 8 miles (13 km) to Vernon, the county seat, and southwest 22 miles (35 km) to Crowell.

== Demographics ==
Historical population
Census	Pop.	Note	%±
2020	173		—
U.S. Decennial Census; 1850–1900 1910; 1920 1930 1940; 1950 1960 1970; 1980 1990 2000; 2010 2020

Lockett first appeared as a census designated place in the 2020 U.S. census.

=== 2020 census ===
Lockett CDP, Texas – Racial and ethnic composition Note: the US Census treats Hispanic/Latino as an ethnic category. This table excludes Latinos from the racial categories and assigns them to a separate category. Hispanics/Latinos may be of any race.
Race / Ethnicity (NH = Non-Hispanic)	Pop 2020	% 2020
White alone (NH)	89	51.45%
Black or African American alone (NH)	0	0.00%
Native American or Alaska Native alone (NH)	0	0.00%
Asian alone (NH)	5	2.89%
Native Hawaiian or Pacific Islander alone (NH)	0	0.00%
Other race alone (NH)	0	0.00%
Mixed race or Multiracial (NH)	3	1.73%
Hispanic or Latino (any race)	76	43.93%
Total	173	100.00%

As of the 2020 United States census, there were 173 people, 68 households, and 55 families residing in the CDP.
