= Petersburg, Texas =

- City
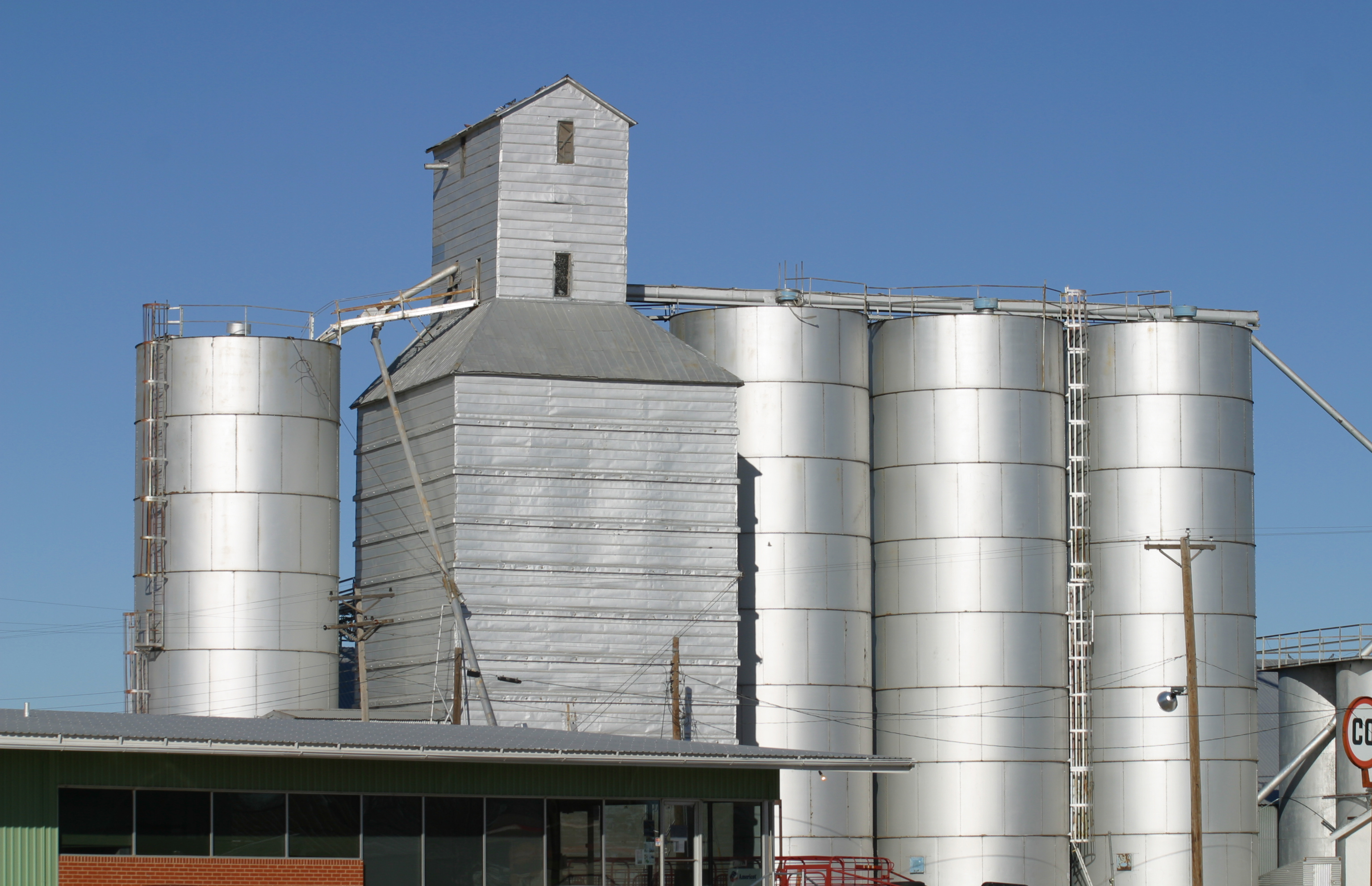
- An old grain elevator in downtown Petersburg

- Location within Texas
- Coordinates: 33°52′10″N 101°35′51″W
- Country: United States
- State: Texas
- County: Hale
- Region: Llano Estacado
- Established: 1891
- Founder: Ed M. White

Area
  - Total: 0.81 sq mi (2.10 km^{2})
  - Land: 0.81 sq mi (2.10 km^{2})
  - Water: 0 sq mi (0.00 km^{2})
- Elevation: 3,255 ft (992 m)

Population (2020)
  - Total: 1,014
  - Density: 1,250/sq mi (483/km^{2})
- Time zone: UTC-6 (CST)
- ZIP code: 79250
- Area code: 806
- FIPS code: 48-56996
- Website: petersburgtx.com

Petersburg is a city in Hale County, Texas, United States. As of the 2020 census, it had a population of 1,014.

== History ==
Petersburg was founded in 1891 as a post office in southeast Hale County. It was named for Zack Peters and his wife, Margaret, who was the first postmistress. In 1902, Ed M. White established a store at the site of the present community, and moved the post office 5 miles (8 km) southwest into Hale County. Although the townsite was platted in 1909, its population remained below 100 until the Fort Worth and Denver Railway was built through town in 1928. Wheat and grain sorghum (milo) were the main crops in the area until cotton was first planted in 1905.

The town was incorporated with a population of 200 in 1927. Petersburg grew as a farming and rail-shipment center, and by 1949, it had 22 businesses and 500 people. By 1980, its population had grown to 1,633; businesses included the Wylie Manufacturing Company, the Hughes Trucking Company, and a weekly newspaper, the Post. The population dropped to 1,262 according to the 2000 census.

== Geography ==
Petersburg is located on the High Plains of the Llano Estacado in southeastern Hale County. It is 27 miles (43 km) south of Plainview, the county seat, and 31 miles (50 km) northeast of Lubbock.

According to the United States Census Bureau, the city has a total area of 0.81 sq mi (2.1 km^{2}), all of it land.

== Demographics ==
Historical population
Census	Pop.	Note	%±
1930	548		—
1940	496		−9.5%
1950	777		56.7%
1960	1,400		80.2%
1970	1,300		−7.1%
1980	1,633		25.6%
1990	1,292		−20.9%
2000	1,262		−2.3%
2010	1,202		−4.8%
2020	1,014		−15.6%
U.S. Decennial Census

=== 2020 census ===
As of the 2020 census, Petersburg had a population of 1,014, 375 households, and 272 families. The median age was 42.0 years. 26.1% of residents were under the age of 18 and 18.5% of residents were 65 years of age or older. For every 100 females there were 96.5 males, and for every 100 females age 18 and over there were 97.6 males age 18 and over.

0.0% of residents lived in urban areas, while 100.0% lived in rural areas.

Of the 375 households in Petersburg, 33.6% had children under the age of 18 living in them. Of all households, 55.7% were married-couple households, 15.7% were households with a male householder and no spouse or partner present, and 24.8% were households with a female householder and no spouse or partner present. About 24.8% of all households were made up of individuals and 11.0% had someone living alone who was 65 years of age or older.

There were 461 housing units, of which 18.7% were vacant. The homeowner vacancy rate was 0.3% and the rental vacancy rate was 6.3%.

Racial composition as of the 2020 census
Race	Number	Percent
White	522	51.5%
Black or African American	7	0.7%
American Indian and Alaska Native	6	0.6%
Asian	5	0.5%
Native Hawaiian and Other Pacific Islander	0	0.0%
Some other race	263	25.9%
Two or more races	211	20.8%
Hispanic or Latino (of any race)	709	69.9%

=== 2000 census ===
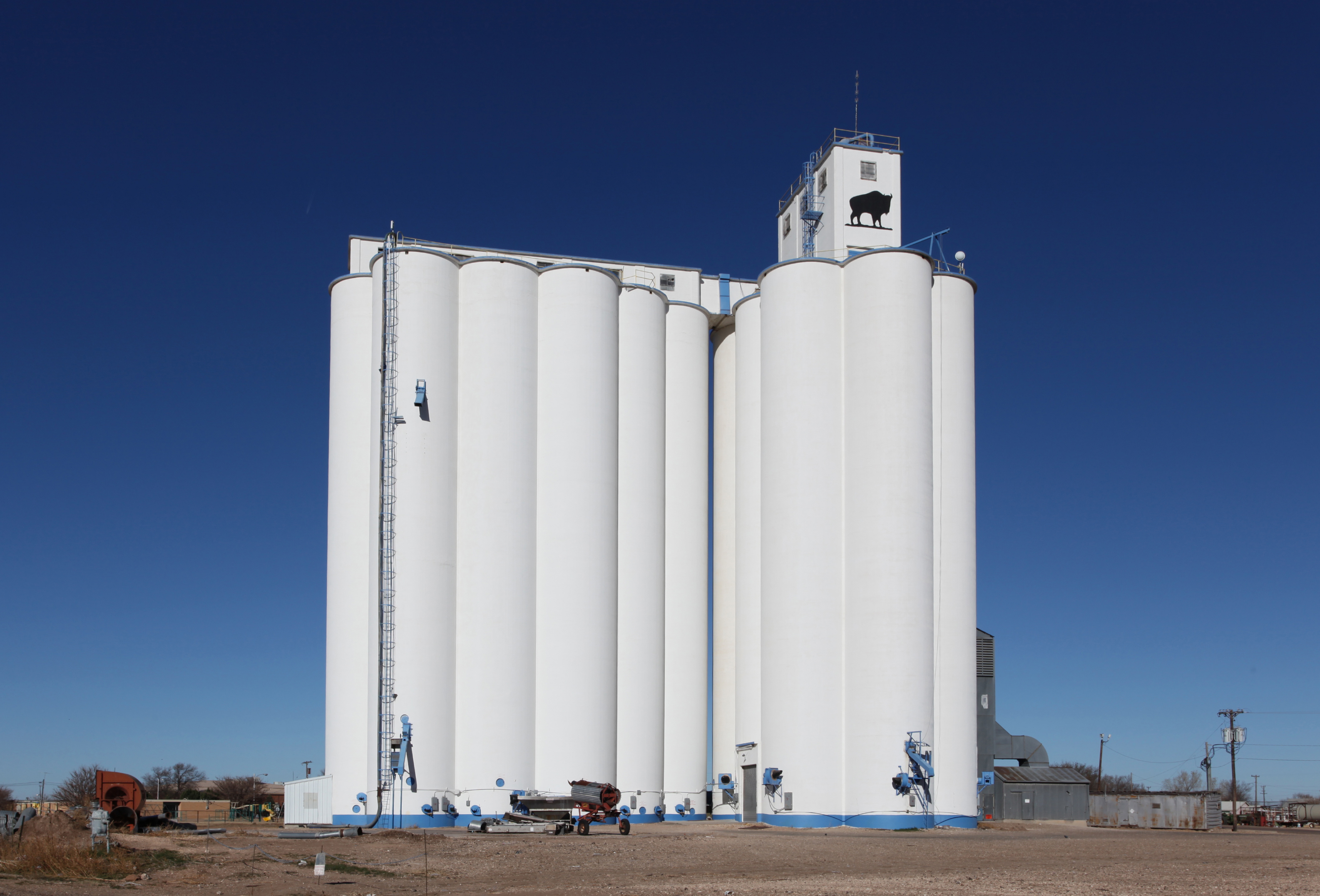
Concrete grain elevator with school mascot (buffalo) at top

As of the census of 2000, 1,262 people, 428 households, and 342 families were residing in the city. The population density was 1,574.8 people/sq mi (609.1/km^{2}). The 498 housing units averaged 621.4/sq mi (240.3/km^{2}). The racial makeup of the city was 61.89% White, 2.14% African American, 1.66% Native American, 32.09% from other races, and 2.22% from two or more races. Hispanics or Latinos of any race were 61.09% of the population.

Of the 428 households, 39.7% had children under 18 living with them, 64.7% were married couples living together, 10.5% had a female householder with no husband present, and 19.9% were not families. About 19.4% of all households were made up of individuals, and 13.8% had someone living alone who was 65 or older. The average household size was 2.95, and the average family size was 3.36.

In the city, the age distribution was 31.7% under 18, 8.6% from 18 to 24, 25.7% from 25 to 44, 20.0% from 45 to 64, and 14.0% who were 65 or older. The median age was 33 years. For every 100 females, there were 96.6 males. For every 100 females age 18 and over, there were 87.4 males.

The median income for a household in the city was $30,263, and for a family was $33,047. Males had a median income of $24,511 versus $17,237 for females. The per capita income for the city was $13,531. About 14.5% of families and 19.6% of the population were below the poverty line, including 26.8% of those under age 18 and 17.3% of those age 65 or over.

== Education ==
The city is served by the Petersburg Independent School District, and is home to the Petersburg High School Buffaloes.

== See also ==
- Barwise, Texas
- Becton, Texas
- Estacado, Texas
