= Providence, Texas =

Unincorporated community in Texas, US

Providence is an unincorporated community in Anderson County, in the U.S. state of Texas. It is a part of the Palestine, Texas micropolitan area.

== History ==
Providence got its start by a land grant given to W.T. Miller on March 20, 1858, in which he was given 8 acres of land for a church and a cemetery. The residents and the community's masons built a two-story tall building with a church in the downstairs area, and a lodge called Providence Lodge No. 400 in the upstairs area. This lodge was chartered on June 15, 1874, and a man named George H. Stovall was the master. A tornado came by in 1900 and completely destroyed the building, which was then moved to the nearby town of Elkhart five years later. The community's church members worshipped under an arbor until the materials that were not destroyed by the 1900 tornado were used to build a new, one-story building. The community had numerous houses in the 1930s. The community's church then voted for its closure in 1935. Then, on June 3, 1973, that church and its cemetery were given a dedication by a Texas Historical Marker. Every first Sunday of June each year is when a memorial service for the church occurs. This church and its cemetery and a few scattered houses were the only things remaining in the community in 1992. Eight years later, in 2000, Providence was featured on county highway maps, but never had a population estimate available.

== Geography ==
Providence stands just off of Farm to Market Road 323 near Slocum, approximately 11 mi (18 km) northwest of Palestine in the northwestern portion of Anderson County.

== Education ==
A school was to be built in Providence on the eight acre land grant given to W.T. Miller on March 20, 1858, and the community's lodge was also used as a school. The community's school served 48 Black students in 1897, and was eventually closed in 1905. Afterwards, the community's school age children attended school in nearby communities. Another school opened in the community in the 1930s.
