= Idalou Independent School District =

School district in Texas

Idalou Independent School District is a public school district based in Idalou, Texas (United States) that serves students in northeastern Lubbock County.

In addition to Idalou, the district includes a small section of Lubbock.

Idalou ISD has three schools, all of which share a single campus –

- Idalou High School (Grades 9–12),
- Idalou Middle (Grades 5–8), and
- Idalou Elementary (Grades PK-4).

In 2009, the school district was rated "academically acceptable" by the Texas Education Agency.
