= Petersburg Independent School District =

School district in Texas

Petersburg Independent School District is a public school district based in Petersburg, Texas (USA).

Located in Hale County, small portions of the district extend into Crosby and Floyd counties.

In 2009, the school district was rated "academically acceptable" by the Texas Education Agency.

== Schools ==
- Petersburg High School (Grades 7–12)
- Petersburg Elementary School (Grades PK-6)
