= Floyd County, Texas =

County in Texas, United States

- County
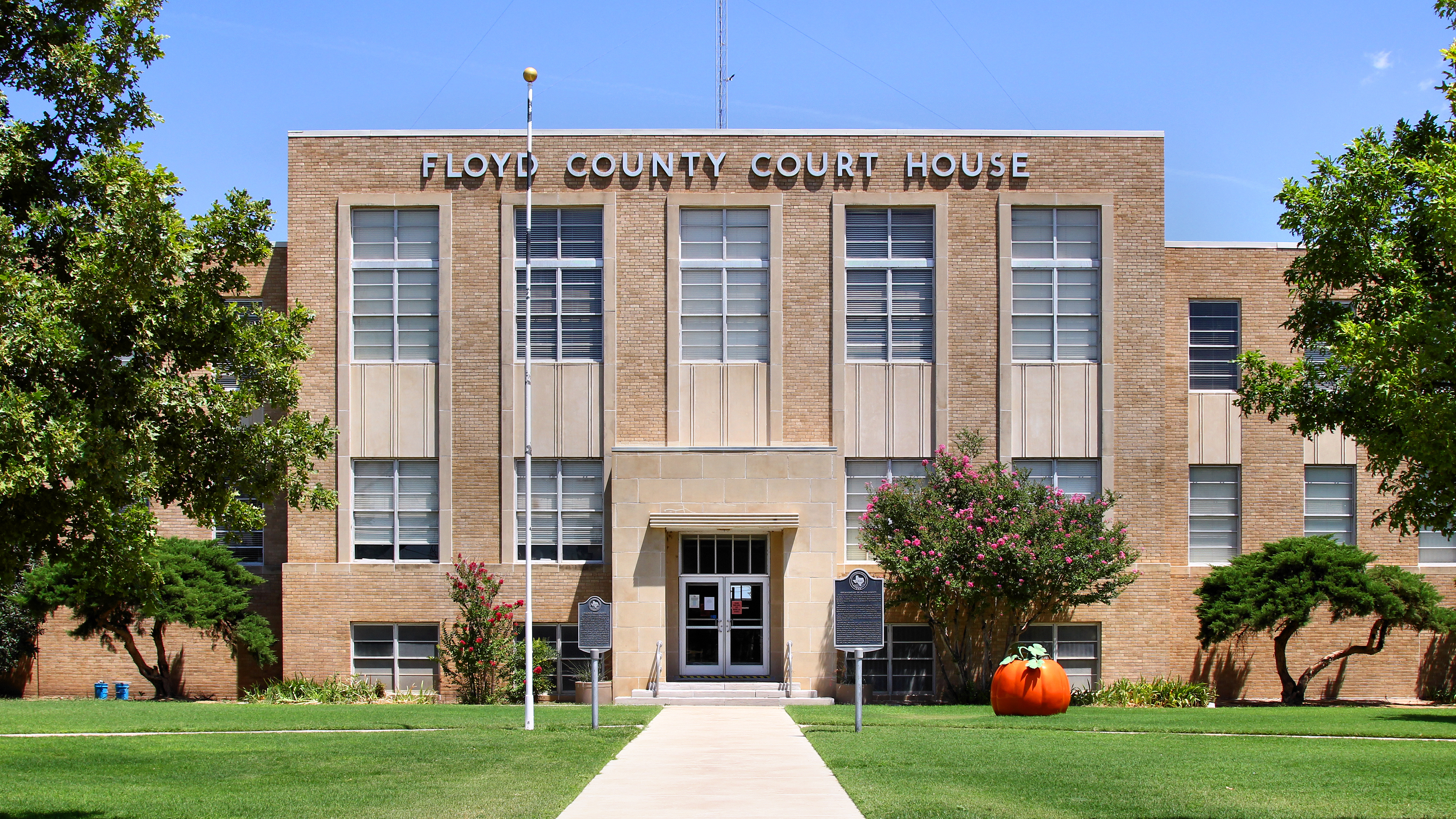
- The Floyd County Courthouse in Floydada

- Location within the U.S. state of Texas
- Coordinates: 34°04′N 101°18′W
- Country: United States
- State: Texas
- Founded: 1890
- Named for: Dolphin Ward Floyd
- Seat: Floydada
- Largest city: Floydada

Area
  - Total: 993 sq mi (2,570 km^{2})
  - Land: 992 sq mi (2,570 km^{2})
  - Water: 0.4 sq mi (1.0 km^{2}) 0.04%

Population (2020)
  - Total: 5,402
  - Estimate (2025): 4,881 ▼
  - Density: 5.45/sq mi (2.10/km^{2})
- Time zone: UTC−6 (Central)
  - Summer (DST): UTC−5 (CDT)
- Congressional district: 19th
- Website: www.co.floyd.tx.us

Floyd County is a county in the U.S. state of Texas. As of the 2020 census, its population was 5,402. The seat of the county is Floydada. The county was created in 1876 and later organized in 1890. It is named for Dolphin Ward Floyd, who died on his 32nd birthday, March 6, 1836, defending the Alamo.

The Matador Ranch, based in Motley County, once reached into Floyd County, as well.

== Geography ==
According to the U.S. Census Bureau, the county has a total area of 993 square miles (2,570 km^{2}), of which 992 square miles (2,570 km^{2}) are land and 0.4 square miles (1.0 km^{2}) (0.04%) is covered by water.

=== Major highways ===
- U.S. Highway 62
- U.S. Highway 70
- State Highway 207
- Loop 75

=== Adjacent counties ===
- Briscoe County (north)
- Motley County (east)
- Dickens County (southeast)
- Crosby County (south)
- Lubbock County (southwest)
- Hale County (west)
- Swisher County (northwest)

== Demographics ==
Historical population
Census	Pop.	Note	%±
1880	3		—
1890	529		17,533.3%
1900	2,020		281.9%
1910	4,638		129.6%
1920	9,758		110.4%
1930	12,409		27.2%
1940	10,659		−14.1%
1950	10,535		−1.2%
1960	12,369		17.4%
1970	11,044		−10.7%
1980	9,834		−11.0%
1990	8,497		−13.6%
2000	7,771		−8.5%
2010	6,446		−17.1%
2020	5,402		−16.2%
2025 (est.)	4,881	▼	−9.6%
U.S. Decennial Census; 1850–2010 2010 2020

=== Racial and ethnic composition ===
Floyd County, Texas – Racial and ethnic composition Note: the US Census treats Hispanic/Latino as an ethnic category. This table excludes Latinos from the racial categories and assigns them to a separate category. Hispanics/Latinos may be of any race.
Race / Ethnicity (NH = Non-Hispanic)	Pop 2000	Pop 2010	Pop 2020	% 2000	% 2010	% 2020
White alone (NH)	3,875	2,777	2,079	49.86%	43.08%	38.49%
Black or African American alone (NH)	252	211	125	3.24%	3.27%	2.31%
Native American or Alaska Native alone (NH)	33	16	7	0.42%	0.25%	0.13%
Asian alone (NH)	12	11	12	0.15%	0.17%	0.22%
Pacific Islander alone (NH)	3	1	1	0.04%	0.02%	0.02%
Other race alone (NH)	3	1	13	0.04%	0.02%	0.24%
Multiracial (NH)	24	19	98	0.31%	0.29%	1.81%
Hispanic or Latino (any race)	3,569	3,410	3,067	45.93%	52.90%	56.78%
Total	7,771	6,446	5,402	100.00%	100.00%	100.00%

=== 2020 census ===
As of the 2020 census, the county had a population of 5,402. The median age was 40.3 years, with 27.3% of residents under the age of 18 and 20.5% aged 65 years or older. For every 100 females there were 97.9 males, and for every 100 females age 18 and over there were 95.0 males age 18 and over.

The racial makeup of the county was 57.4% White, 2.9% Black or African American, 0.3% American Indian and Alaska Native, 0.2% Asian, 0.1% Native Hawaiian and Pacific Islander, 12.2% from some other race, and 26.9% from two or more races. Hispanic or Latino residents of any race comprised 56.8% of the population.

Less than 0.1% of residents lived in urban areas, while 100.0% lived in rural areas.

There were 2,125 households in the county, of which 33.7% had children under the age of 18 living in them. Of all households, 50.6% were married-couple households, 18.7% were households with a male householder and no spouse or partner present, and 25.4% were households with a female householder and no spouse or partner present. About 26.5% of all households were made up of individuals and 13.2% had someone living alone who was 65 years of age or older.

There were 2,603 housing units, of which 18.4% were vacant. Among occupied housing units, 72.2% were owner-occupied and 27.8% were renter-occupied. The homeowner vacancy rate was 1.3% and the rental vacancy rate was 14.1%.

=== 2010 census ===
As of the 2010 census, the county had 6,446 people.

=== Historical population ===
In 1880, only three white men (Richard H. Woolf, Samuel Mobly, and A.S. Presley, all three of whom worked as cattle ranchers and/or cowboys and were aged 23 years old) resided in Floyd County, TX, but the population of the county soon grew to 529 people by 1890, and to 2020 by 1900, and even larger in the following decades.

=== 2000 census ===
The 2000 census showed 2,730 households and 2,110 families residing in the county. The population density was 8 people per square mile (3.1 people/km^{2}). The3,221 housing units averaged of 3 per square mile (1.2/km^{2}). The racial makeup of the county was 74.16% White, 3.38% African American, 0.76% Native American, 0.17% Asian, 0.05% Pacific Islander, 19.66% from other races, and 1.81% from two or more races. About 45.93% of the population was Hispanic or Latino of any race.

Of the 2,730 households, 39.4% had children under 18 living with them, 63.9% were married couples living together, 9.7% had a female householder with no husband present, and 22.7% were not families. Around 21.3% of all households were made up of individuals, and 12.3% had someone living alone who was 65 or older. The average household size was 2.79 and the average family size was 3.26.

In the county, the population was distributed as 31.40% under 18, 7.40% from 18 to 24, 24.40% from 25 to 44, 20.70% from 45 to 64, and 16.20% who were 65 or older. The median age was 35 years. For every 100 females there were 93.80 males. For every 100 females 18 and over, there were 89.90 males.

The median income for a household in the county was $26,851 and for a family was $32,123. Males had a median income of $25,487 versus $18,929 for females. The per capita income for the county was $14,206. About 19.50% of families and 21.50% of the population were below the poverty line, including 28.60% of those under 18 and 16.50% of those 65 or over.

== Wind energy development ==
Floyd County is ideal for wind development. It is located in what many call the wind corridor of the United States, which stretches from the Panhandle of Texas north into Minnesota, including some of the most wind-rich states in the country. Reasons include the quality of wind in the region, the possibilities of connecting into two different electric grid systems, and the scheduled transmission line build-out in the area.

== Communities ==
=== City ===
- Floydada (county seat)

=== Town ===
- Lockney

=== Unincorporated communities ===
- Aiken
- Barwise
- Dougherty
- South Plains

== Media ==
Floyd County is home to two general news organizations and two radio stations. In addition, Floydada is the corporate headquarters for Paramount Broadcasting Corp., which provides daily agricultural programming to All Ag, All Day affiliates (KFLP (AM) in Floydada, and KPUR (AM) in Amarillo, Texas), as well as All Ag Network affiliates from Fresno, California, to Utica, New York. For the first 23 years, the West Texas Friday Night Scoreboard show was produced and syndicated from the downtown Floydada studios before moving to its current Lubbock studios in 2019.

=== Online ===
- Floyd County Record

=== Print ===
- Floyd County Hesperian-Beacon

=== Radio ===
- KFLP (AM) 900
- KFCX 106.1

== Politics ==
Floyd County is located within District 83 of the Texas House of Representatives. Floyd County is located within District 28 of the Texas Senate.

United States presidential election results for Floyd County, Texas
Year	Republican		Democratic		Third party(ies)	
Year	No.	%	No.	%	No.	%
1912	22	4.79%	381	83.01%	56	12.20%
1916	48	6.55%	600	81.86%	85	11.60%
1920	167	15.67%	841	78.89%	58	5.44%
1924	166	11.93%	1,197	85.99%	29	2.08%
1928	1,176	63.84%	666	36.16%	0	0.00%
1932	145	6.82%	1,976	92.94%	5	0.24%
1936	217	10.36%	1,863	88.93%	15	0.72%
1940	484	20.41%	1,880	79.29%	7	0.30%
1944	370	15.11%	1,756	71.73%	322	13.15%
1948	344	12.97%	2,174	81.94%	135	5.09%
1952	2,066	58.46%	1,463	41.40%	5	0.14%
1956	1,445	44.86%	1,767	54.86%	9	0.28%
1960	1,580	51.94%	1,437	47.24%	25	0.82%
1964	1,229	33.94%	2,383	65.81%	9	0.25%
1968	1,465	40.50%	1,305	36.08%	847	23.42%
1972	2,181	72.17%	841	27.83%	0	0.00%
1976	1,402	41.07%	1,991	58.32%	21	0.62%
1980	2,043	57.45%	1,477	41.54%	36	1.01%
1984	2,092	66.75%	1,023	32.64%	19	0.61%
1988	1,741	55.48%	1,391	44.33%	6	0.19%
1992	1,676	55.70%	947	31.47%	386	12.83%
1996	1,530	57.78%	986	37.24%	132	4.98%
2000	1,830	75.62%	580	23.97%	10	0.41%
2004	2,032	78.64%	545	21.09%	7	0.27%
2008	1,784	70.77%	730	28.96%	7	0.28%
2012	1,523	73.05%	551	26.43%	11	0.53%
2016	1,474	75.24%	435	22.21%	50	2.55%
2020	1,584	77.65%	438	21.47%	18	0.88%
2024	1,715	82.06%	358	17.13%	17	0.81%

United States Senate election results for Floyd County, Texas1
Year	Republican		Democratic		Third party(ies)	
Year	No.	%	No.	%	No.	%
2024	1,420	75.81%	406	21.68%	47	2.51%

United States Senate election results for Floyd County, Texas2
Year	Republican		Democratic		Third party(ies)	
Year	No.	%	No.	%	No.	%
2020	1,554	78.09%	397	19.95%	39	1.96%

Texas Gubernatorial election results for Floyd County
Year	Republican		Democratic		Third party(ies)	
Year	No.	%	No.	%	No.	%
2022	1,250	85.21%	201	13.70%	16	1.09%

== Education ==
School districts serving the county include:

- Floydada Independent School District
- Lockney Independent School District
- Motley County Independent School District
- Petersburg Independent School District
- Plainview Independent School District
- Turkey-Quitaque Independent School District

The county is in the service area of South Plains College.

== See also ==
- Dry county
- Quitaque Creek
- National Register of Historic Places listings in Floyd County, Texas
- Recorded Texas Historic Landmarks in Floyd County
- Floydada Economic Development Corporation
