= Petersburg High School (Texas) =

Location
- 1411 West 4th Street; Petersburg, Texas 79250-0169; United States; 33.871561°N 101.603076°W

Information
- School type: Public high school
- Motto: "The Buffalo Way, Every Day!"
- School district: Petersburg Independent School District
- Principal: Richie Tarbet
- Teaching staff: 28.14 (FTE)
- Grades: PK-12
- Enrollment: 274 (2023–2024)
- Student to teacher ratio: 9.74
- Colors: Black & Gold
- Athletics conference: UIL Class A
- Mascot: Buffalo/Lady Buff
- Website: Petersburg High School

Petersburg High School is a public high school located in Petersburg, Texas (USA), a small farming community in the southern panhandle portion of the state and classified as a 1A school by the UIL. The school is part of the Petersburg Independent School District which encompasses the southeastern corner of Hale County and reaches into portions of Floyd and Crosby counties. In 2015, the school was rated "Improvement Required" by the Texas Education Agency.

== Athletics ==
The school has a rich history of excellence in academics as well as athletics. During the 1960s and 1970s, Petersburg was well known in the area for producing outstanding football teams which competed under the state's University Interscholastic League (UIL) authority. Due to a decrease in the local population, the school now plays six-man football sanctioned by the UIL.

The Petersburg Buffaloes also compete in the following sports - Baseball and Softball

- Basketball
- Cross Country
- Golf
- Tennis
- Track and Field

=== State Titles ===
- Football -
  - 1963(1A)

==== State Finalist ====
- Boys Basketball -
  - 1992(1A)

== Band ==
The school's band was equally notable, annually producing Division I rankings (the UIL's top rank) over a period spanning more than two decades.
