= Becton, Texas =

- Unincorporated community
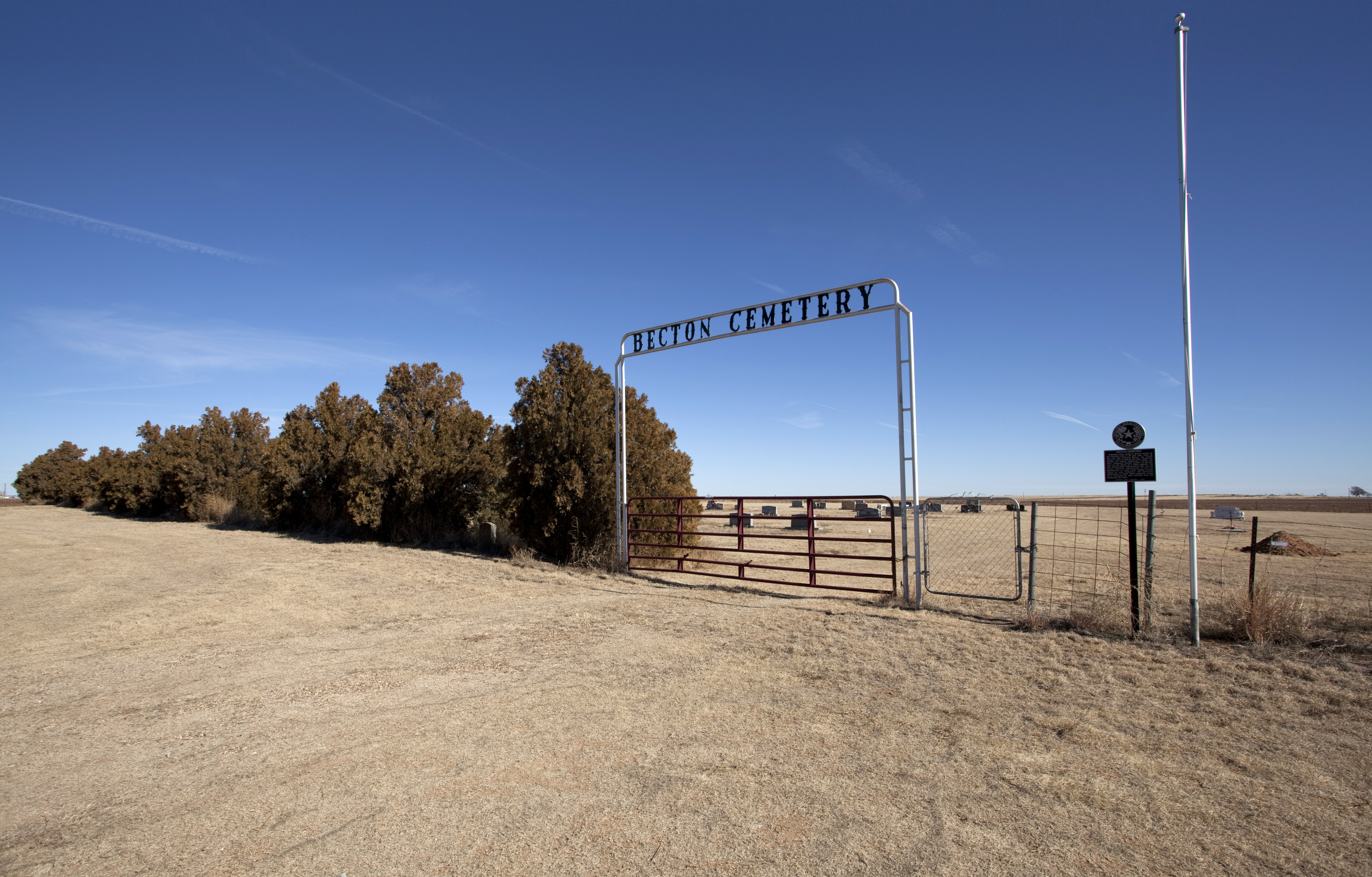
- Becton Cemetery

- Location within Texas Location within the United States
- Coordinates: 33°47′01″N 101°38′52″W
- Country: United States
- State: Texas
- County: Lubbock County
- Region: Llano Estacado
- Established: 1910
- Elevation: 3,255 ft (992 m)
- Time zone: UTC-6 (CST)
- Website: Handbook of Texas

Becton is an unincorporated community in northeastern Lubbock County, Texas, United States. According to the Handbook of Texas, the community had a population of 125 in 2000. It is located within the Lubbock metropolitan area.

== History ==
It was originally named for W. E. Bledsoe of the Three Circle Ranch, but when E. H. Moody petitioned for a post office in 1917, he adopted the name Becton, after an early resident named Abner M. Becton, because there was already a town named Bledsoe in Texas. Moody went on to become the first and only postmaster in the settlement. Becton received mail via the Lorenzo Star Route until 1928 when the Fort Worth and Denver Railway commenced its operations. Oldtimers claim the post office was open until 1949, although some reports state it closed in 1943. The community was served by the Bledsoe Church of Christ from its founding in 1917 until the early 1970s. The Bethany Baptist Church, the original name of the Bledsoe Baptist Church, was established in 1915 and possessed a separate structure. Becton Baptist Church was a new structure constructed by the Baptist organization in the 1920s. 1973 saw the dissolution of the small surviving congregation due to a decline in membership. Situated in a fertile agricultural region, the community saw growing prosperity following the installation of irrigation. There were three companies, a church, and 25 people living in Becton in 1936. By 1945–46, the population had increased to 150, and there were still three companies. Becton had 125 residents and no enterprises in 1974. There were three churches and a factory in the village in 1978. It had 125 residents and no businesses from 1990 through 2000.

== Geography ==
Becton is located on the Burlington Northern Railroad just east of Farm to Market Road 400, 24 mi (39 km) east of Lubbock in northeastern Lubbock County.

== Education ==
Land for a new school building was provided by Abner M. Becton. W. E. Bledsoe built the first school, a one-room structure that housed pupils for two terms. Local churches also held services at the school. In 1910, it was relocated, but it subsequently caught fire. A new brick structure was constructed in 1924. Once merged with the Estacado school district, the Bledsoe Independent School District is among the oldest in Lubbock County. Bledsoe School joined the Idalou Independent School District in the summer of 1936. Becton had two schools that year.

== Notable person ==
- Bill Kelley, tight end for the Green Bay Packers.

== Gallery ==
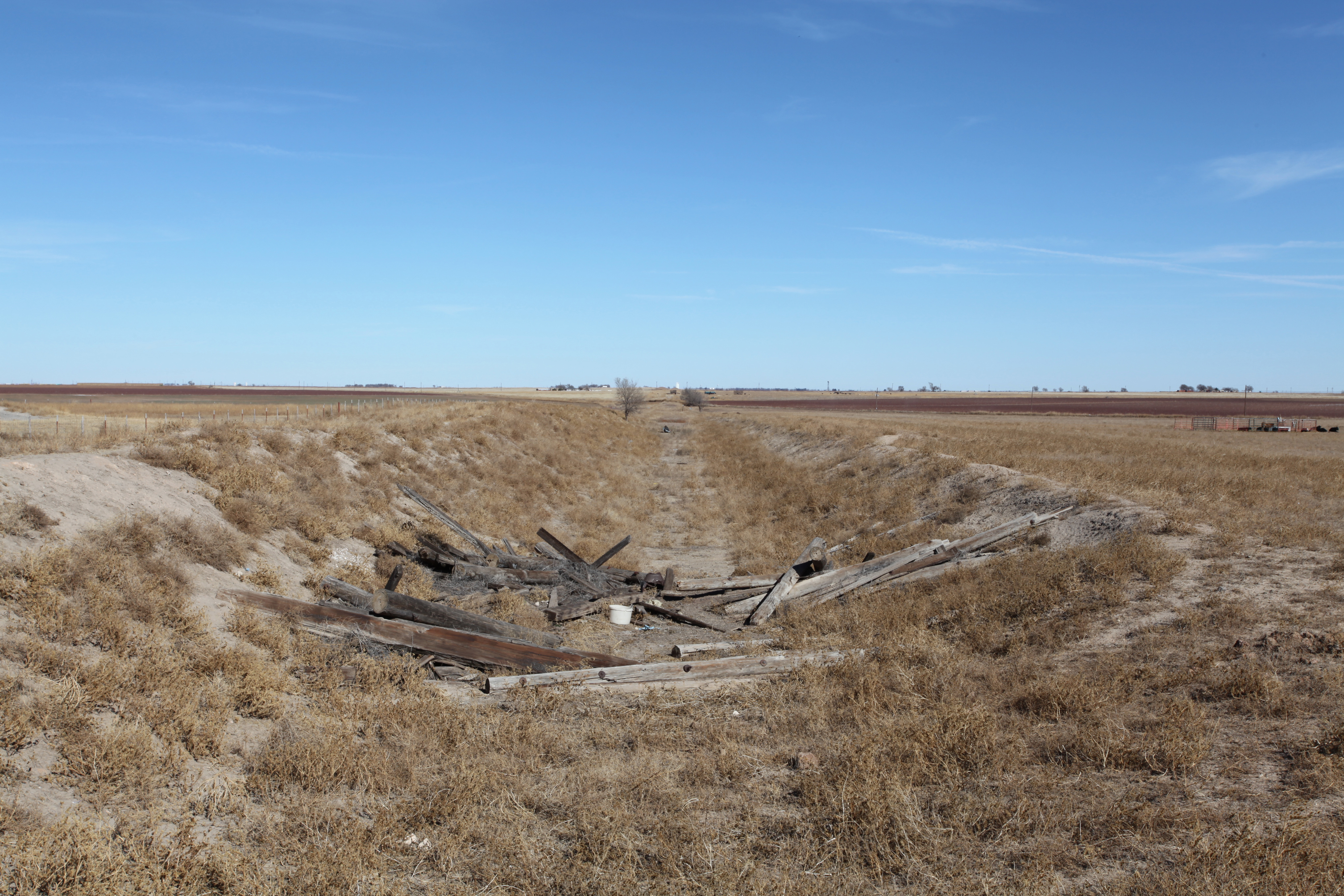
The Fort Worth and Denver South Plains Railway used to pass through Becton. The collapsed remains of a wooden railway overpass can be seen at the bottom of the roadcut.

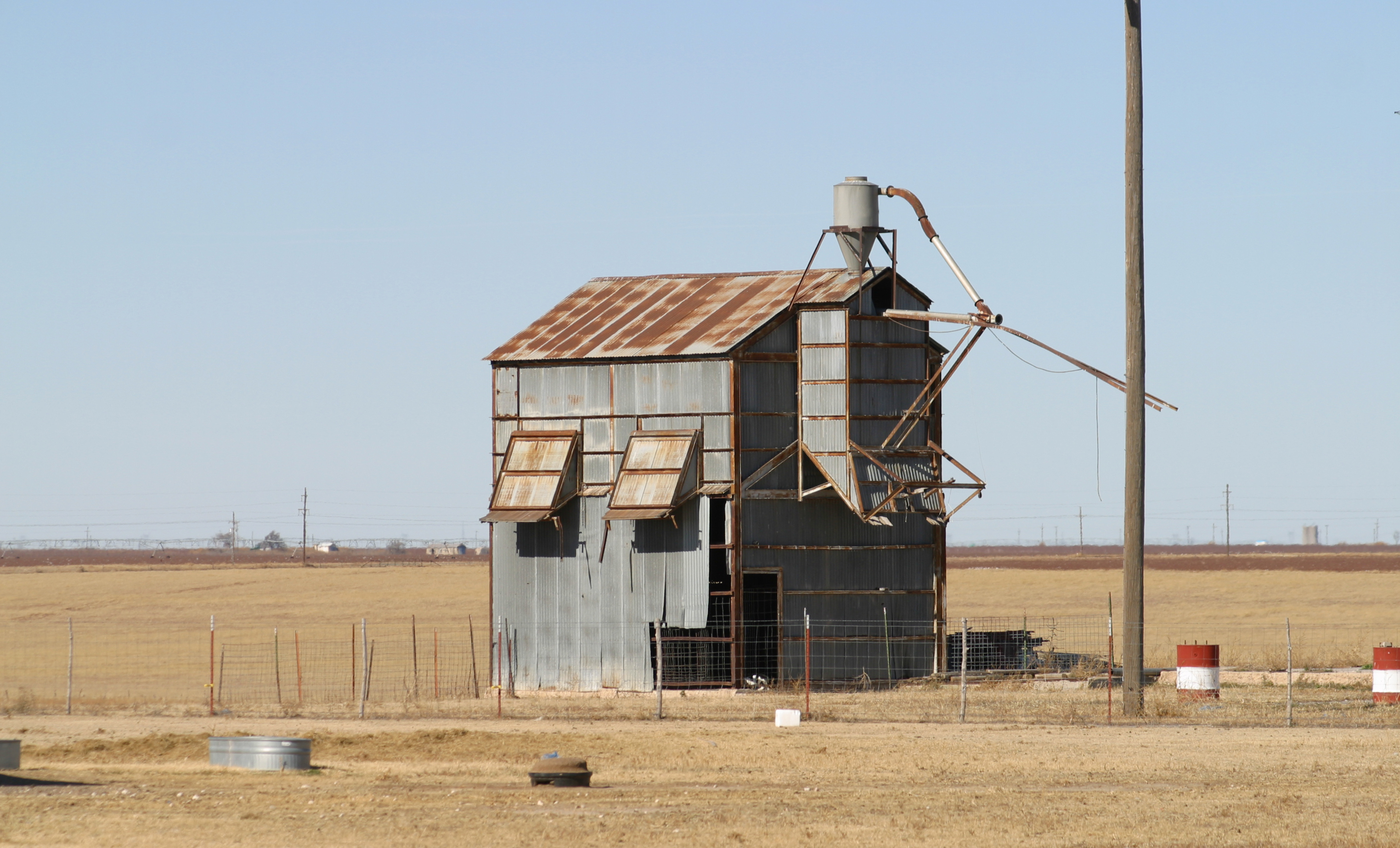
An old farm building: a remnant of Becton's past.
