= KFCX =

- Floydada, Texas; United States
- Broadcast area: Lubbock, Texas
- Frequency: 106.1 MHz

Programming
- Format: Texas country

Ownership
- Owner: Paramount Broadcasting Corp.; (Anthony L. Ricketts)
- Sister stations: KFLP

History
- First air date: 1985
- Former call signs: KLLP (1984–1985); KKAP-FM (1985–1992); KFLL (1992–2001); KFLP-FM (2001–2026)

Technical information
- Licensing authority: FCC
- Facility ID: 57025
- Class: C3
- ERP: 25,000 watts
- HAAT: 71 meters (233 ft)
- Transmitter coordinates: 33°58′7″N 101°21′15″W

Links
- Public license information: Public file; LMS
- Website: www.1061flipfm.com

KFCX (106.1 FM) is a radio station licensed to Floydada, Texas, United States. The station serves the Lubbock area. KFCX is owned by Anthony L. Ricketts.

== History ==
The station went on the air as KLLP on July 2, 1984. On January 28, 1985, the station changed its call sign to KKAP-FM; on July 6, 1992, to KFLL; on February 1, 2001, to KFLP-FM; and on November 1, 2026, to KFCX.

Today, the station broadcasts a country music format with an emphasis on Texas country. It also broadcasts all Floydada High School sporting events (football, basketball, baseball, and softball) and is the flagship station of the West Texas Friday Night Scoreboard Show, heard on 50 stations across Texas.
