= South Plains, Texas =

- Unincorporated community
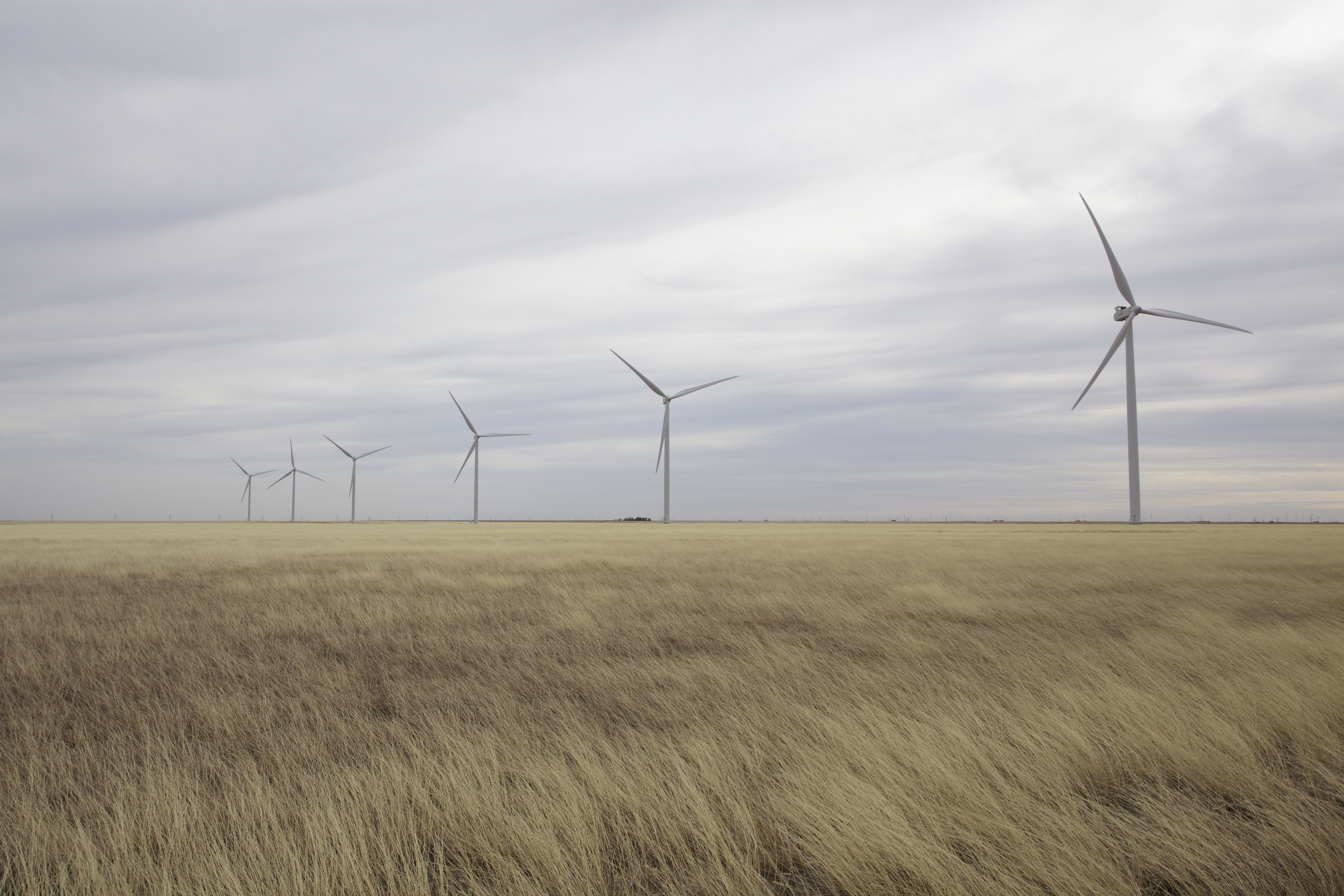
- Wind farm near South Plains

- Location within the state of Texas South Plains (the United States)
- Coordinates: 34°13′28″N 101°18′35″W
- Country: United States
- State: Texas
- County: Floyd
- Elevation: 3,215 ft (980 m)
- Time zone: UTC-6 (Central (CST))
  - Summer (DST): UTC-5 (CDT)
- ZIP codes: 79258
- GNIS feature ID: 1368739

South Plains is an unincorporated community in northern Floyd County, Texas, United States. It lies along State Highway 207 north of the city of Floydada, the county seat of Floyd County. Its elevation is 3,215 ft (980 m). Although South Plains is unincorporated, it has a post office, with the ZIP code of 79258.

Quitaque Creek flows past just north of the community and creates a gorge in the Caprock Escarpment about 3 mi (4.8 km) to the east.

== History ==
A post office was established at South Plains in 1909, several miles from the current location; it was moved twice before reaching the current location in 1927, along the Fort Worth and Denver Railway. The community flourished in the 1920s, with a school and businesses being established, but the coming of the Great Depression led to a decline of population.

== See also ==
- Llano Estacado
- Caprock Canyons State Park and Trailway
- South Plains Wind Farm
