= KFLP (AM) =

- Floydada, Texas; United States
- Broadcast area: Lubbock, Texas
- Frequency: 900 kHz
- Branding: The Farm Station

Programming
- Format: Agricultural

Ownership
- Owner: Paramount Broadcasting Corp.; (Anthony L. Ricketts)
- Sister stations: KFCX

History
- First air date: 1951
- Former call signs: KFLD (1951–1972); KFLP (1972–1980); KFBA (1980–1985); KKAP (1985–1992); KAWA (1992–1996)
- Call sign meaning: Floydada, Lubbock, Plainview

Technical information
- Licensing authority: FCC
- Facility ID: 57026
- Class: D
- Power: 250 watts daytime; 7 watts nighttime
- Transmitter coordinates: 33°58′20.3″N 101°21′1.6″W
- Translator: (98.5 MHz) K253CP (Floydada)

Links
- Public license information: Public file; LMS
- Webcast: [www.AllAgNews.com Listen live]
- Website: Official website

KFLP (900 AM) is a radio station licensed to Floydada, Texas, United States.

The station serves the Lubbock area. It originates its programming from studios in Lubbock and Floydada. KFLP is owned by Anthony L. Ricketts. It broadcasts agribusiness news, agricultural market information, and weather reports. It is the flagship station for the All Ag Radio Network. Syndicated programs developed by the All Ag Network include Agriculture Today, the Agribusiness Report, Growing Cotton, American Cattle News, and the Ag News Update.

== History ==
The station went on-air as KFLD on April 1, 1951. This call sign remained until 1972, when it was changed to KFLP and then to KFBA on July 9, 1980. On January 28, 1985, it changed call signs once again to KKAP, then on June 6, 1992, to KAWA. On March 22, 1996, the station call sign was changed back to KFLP.
