= Estacado, Texas =

- unincorporated community
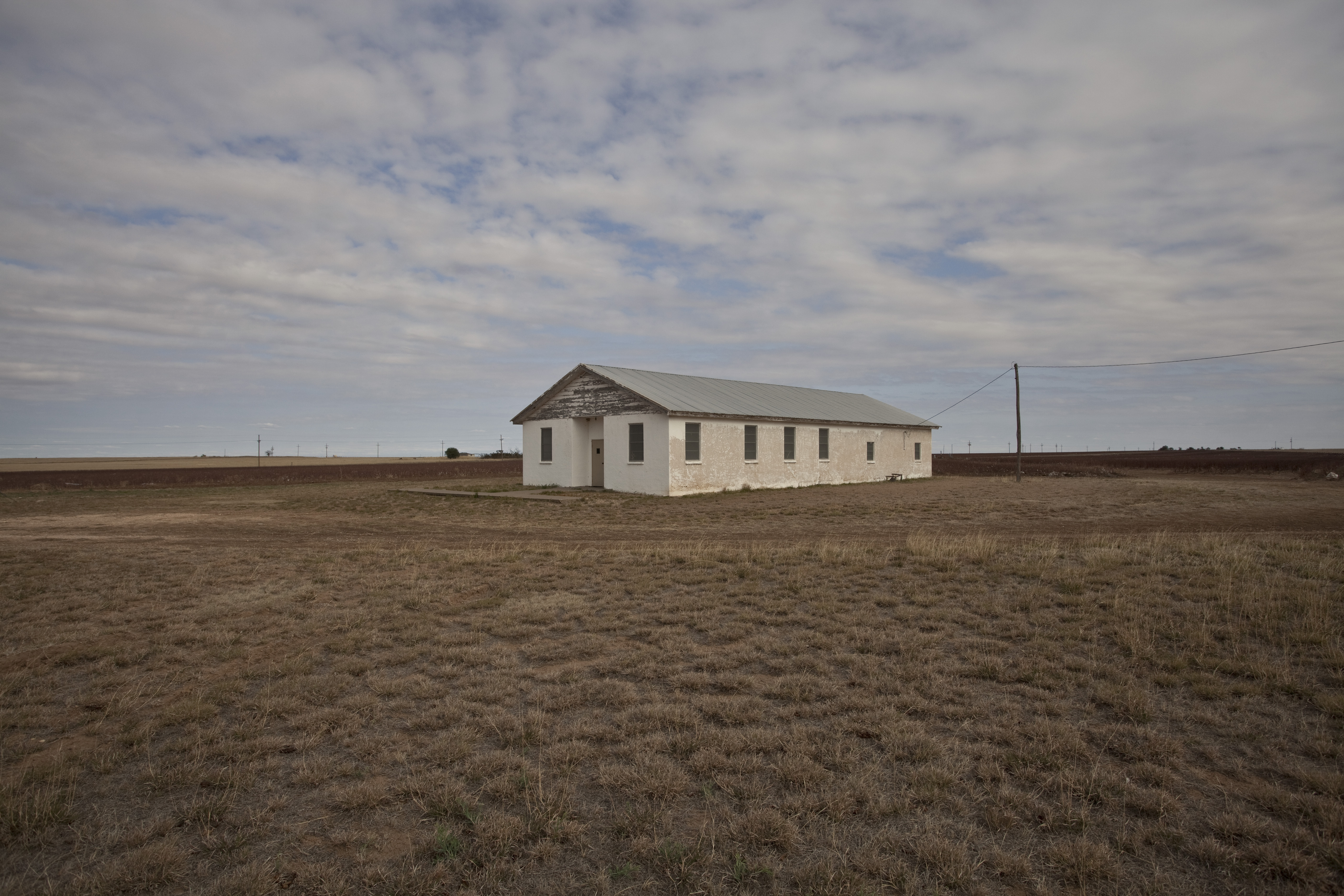
- Abandoned church in Estacado, Texas.

- Location within Texas Location within the United States
- Coordinates: 33°45′08″N 101°33′43″W
- Country: United States
- State: Texas
- Counties: Crosby, Lubbock
- Elevation: 3,199 ft (975 m)
- Time zone: UTC-6 (Central (CST))
  - Summer (DST): UTC-5 (CDT)
- Area code: 806
- FIPS code: 48-24612
- GNIS feature ID: 1373675
- Website: Handbook of Texas

Estacado is an unincorporated community in Crosby and Lubbock Counties in the U.S. state of Texas. According to the Handbook of Texas, the community had a population of 80 in 2000. It is located within the Lubbock metropolitan area.

== History ==
The South Plains' first White farming community was called Estacado. Paris Cox founded it back in 1879. In the late 1870s, Cox had obtained railroad land in western Crosby and eastern Lubbock counties in exchange for his sawmill business in Indiana, to establish a Quaker colony there. The first families (surnamed Cox, Stubbs, Spray, and Hayworth) came to the area in the fall of 1879, just in time to endure a harsh winter. For his family, Cox constructed a sod house, but the other immigrants endured misery in tents and left the colony the next spring, leaving the Cox family as the only residents. However, interest in the colony was rekindled after a profitable crop was harvested, and ten families had been recruited by 1882. The town was originally known as Marietta (or Maryetta) after Cox's wife Mary. However, when the post office was created in 1884, with William Hunt serving as postmaster, the town was renamed Estacado for the nearby Llano Estacado. Estacado was chosen to serve as Crosby County's county seat in 1886. After a few years of prosperity, the town's population was estimated to be 200 in 1890, but Estacado started to deteriorate when Emma took over as the county seat in 1891. Following Cox's death in 1888, the town was left without a leader, and the invasion by grasshoppers and the drought of 1892–1893 all but destroyed it. After 1900, however, the area's favorable growing conditions drew settlers, and Estacado survived despite the dissolution of the original Quaker community. After the post office closed in 1918, mail began to arrive through Petersburg. From 1930 to 1940, the population grew from 68 to 85; from 1970 to 2000, it stayed steady at 80. The community had a cotton gin and some scattered homes in the middle of the 1980s.

== Geography ==
Estacado is located on Farm to Market Road 1527 on the Crosby County line, 12 mi (19 km) northeast of Idalou and 21 mi (34 km) northeast of Lubbock in northeastern Lubbock County. In 1949, Farm to Market Road 1314 traveled through Estacado.

== Education ==
When Emma Hunt started teaching in a dugout classroom in 1882, the hamlet offered some of the earliest organized education on the South Plains; by 1884, classes were being given in the Quaker meetinghouse. The community's first college on the Llano Estacado, Central Plains Academy, was founded in 1890 and ran for two years. Today, the community is served by the Lorenzo Independent School District.

== Notable person ==
- Bill Standifer, Old West lawman, worked as a Range Detective and killed a cattle rustler near Estacado.

== Gallery ==
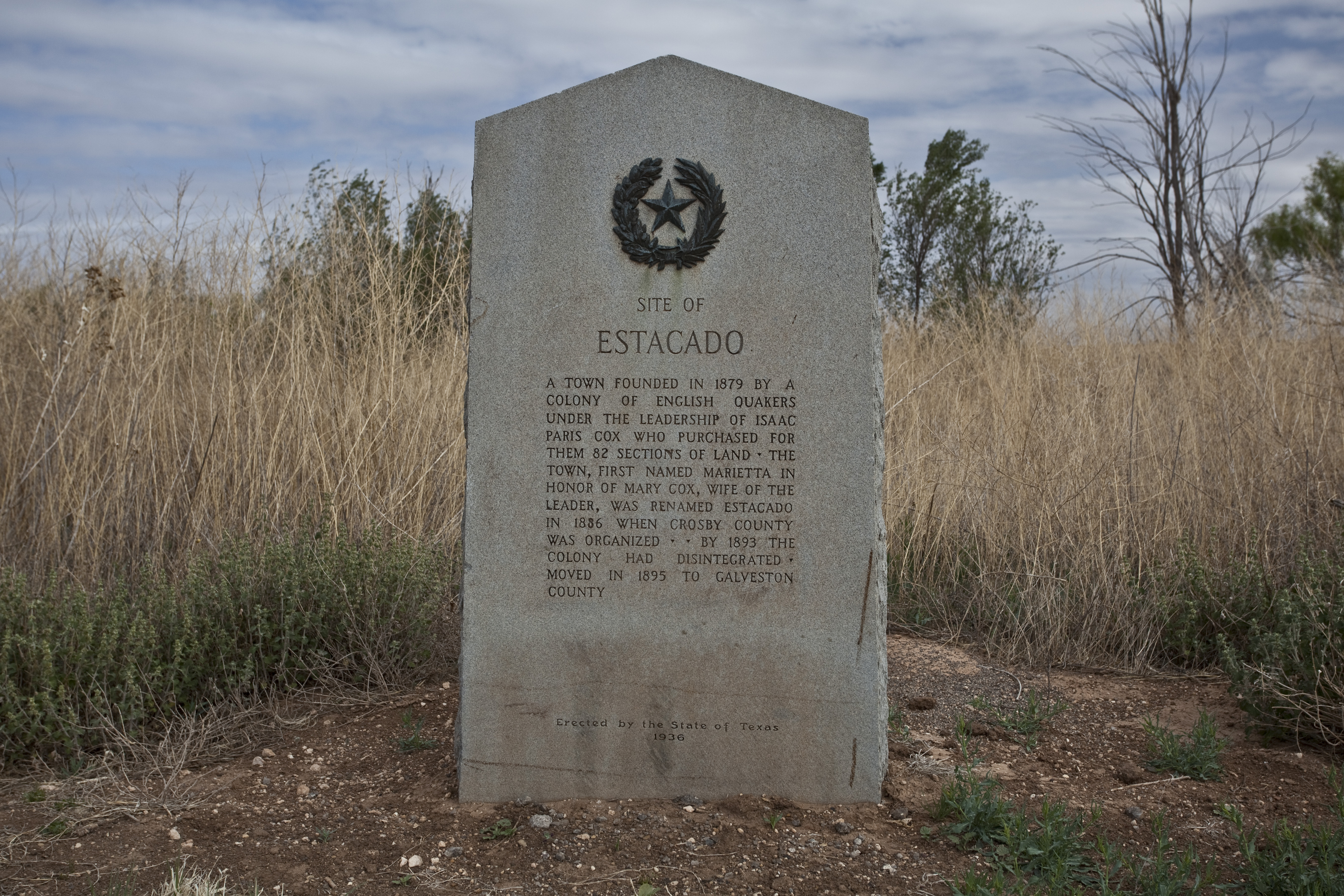
State historical marker erected in 1936 to mark the site of Estacado

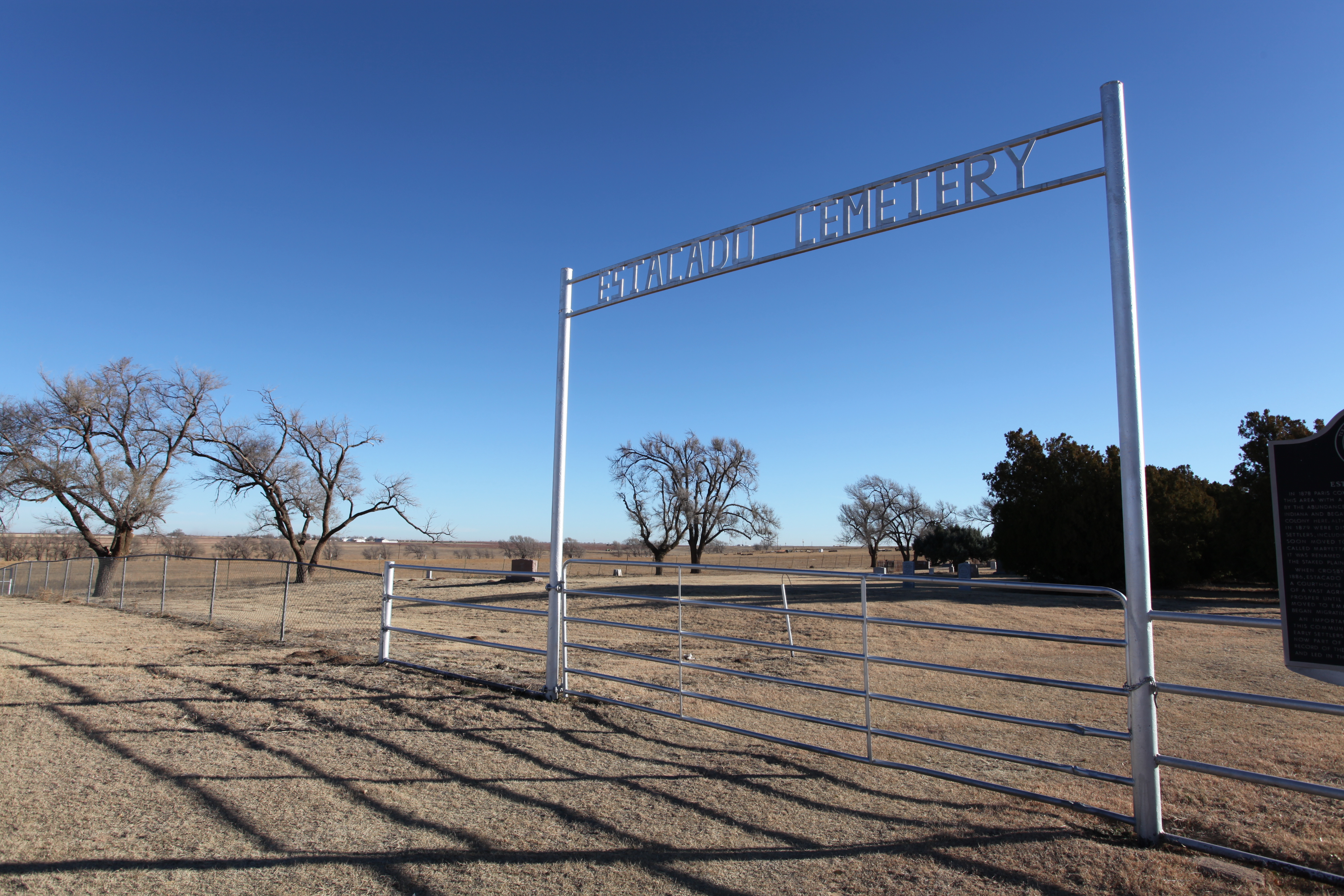
Estacado Cemetery
