= Idalou, Texas =

- City
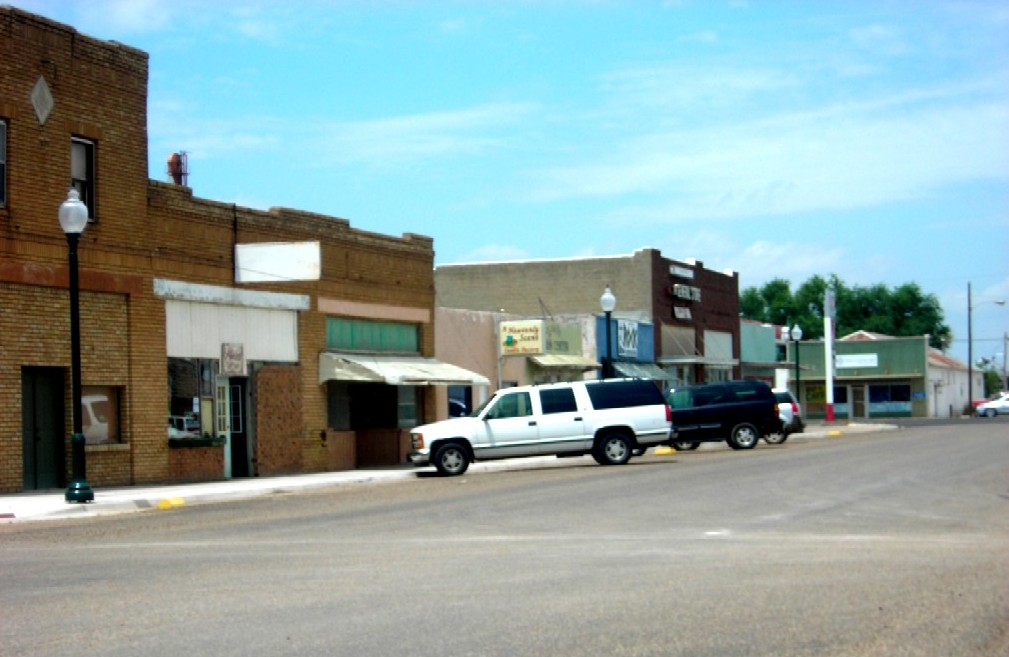
- Businesses in downtown Idalou pictured, July 27, 2009

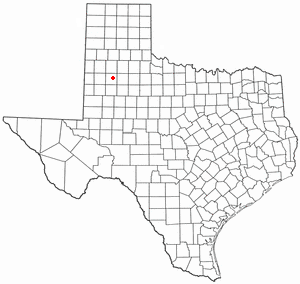
- Location of Idalou, Texas

- Coordinates: 33°39′43″N 101°41′3″W
- Country: United States
- State: Texas
- County: Lubbock
- Incorporated (city): 1925

Area
  - Total: 1.01 sq mi (2.62 km^{2})
  - Land: 1.01 sq mi (2.62 km^{2})
  - Water: 0 sq mi (0.00 km^{2})
- Elevation: 3,192 ft (973 m)

Population (2020)
  - Total: 2,193
  - Density: 2,170/sq mi (837/km^{2})
- Time zone: UTC-6 (Central (CST))
  - Summer (DST): UTC-5 (CDT)
- ZIP code: 79329
- Area code: 806
- FIPS code: 48-35732
- GNIS feature ID: 1359882
- Website: idaloutx.com

Idalou is a city in Lubbock County, Texas, United States. It is located 7 miles (11 km) northeast of Lubbock near the intersection of Farm to Market Road 400 and US 62/US 82/SH 114. The population was 2,193 at the 2020 census. It is part of the Lubbock Metropolitan Statistical Area.

== History ==
Idalou began as a settlement around a depot on the South Plains and Santa Fe Railway in the early 1910s, and within a few years had a one-room schoolhouse and several businesses. The first post office was opened in 1917, and in 1919, a two-story brick school was built after the original school burned down. Incorporated in 1925 with 538 residents, the town grew to 2,348 residents by 1980 and has remained above 2,000 residents in the years since.

Idalou has a post office, library, city park and pool, EMS station, fire department, co-op cotton gin, grocery store, and many other businesses. The town serves as an agricultural center for cotton farming in northeast Lubbock County, with many of the residents employed in farming and farming-related occupations. Due to its close proximity to Lubbock, many residents work in the nearby city.

The town was named for Ida and Lou Bassett, sisters of Julian M. Bassett, vice president of the Crosby-Bassett Livestock Company, during the 1910s.

== Geography ==
Idalou is located at 33°39′43″N 101°41′3″W (33.661938, –101.684234).

According to the United States Census Bureau, the city has a total area of 1.0 square mile (2.5 km^{2}), all land.

== Demographics ==
Historical population
Census	Pop.	Note	%±
1930	538		—
1940	503		−6.5%
1950	1,014		101.6%
1960	1,274		25.6%
1970	1,729		35.7%
1980	2,348		35.8%
1990	2,074		−11.7%
2000	2,157		4.0%
2010	2,250		4.3%
2020	2,193		−2.5%
U.S. Decennial Census

=== 2020 census ===
As of the 2020 census, Idalou had a population of 2,193 people in 823 households, including 466 families. The median age was 38.2 years, with 28.8% of residents under the age of 18 and 17.6% who were 65 years of age or older. For every 100 females there were 98.3 males, and for every 100 females age 18 and over there were 91.9 males age 18 and over.

There were 823 households in Idalou, of which 40.8% had children under the age of 18 living in them. Of all households, 54.6% were married-couple households, 17.3% were households with a male householder and no spouse or partner present, and 25.2% were households with a female householder and no spouse or partner present. About 24.4% of all households were made up of individuals and 12.4% had someone living alone who was 65 years of age or older.

There were 921 housing units, of which 10.6% were vacant. The homeowner vacancy rate was 2.6% and the rental vacancy rate was 9.1%.

0.0% of residents lived in urban areas, while 100.0% lived in rural areas.

Racial composition as of the 2020 census
Race	Number	Percent
White	1,455	66.3%
Black or African American	25	1.1%
American Indian and Alaska Native	10	0.5%
Asian	6	0.3%
Native Hawaiian and Other Pacific Islander	0	0.0%
Some other race	277	12.6%
Two or more races	420	19.2%
Hispanic or Latino (of any race)	959	43.7%

== Education ==
Idalou is served by the Idalou Independent School District.

== In popular culture ==
The town is depicted in the song "Idalou" by the Josh Abbott Band, from the album Small Town Family Dream (2012).

It's also featured in the song "Amarillo Highway (for Dave Hickey)" by Terry Allen on the album Lubbock (on everything) (1979), in the opening lyric, "Well, I'm a high straight in Plainview, side bet in Idalou, and a fresh deck in New Deal."
