= David Thomas (American football) =

American football player (born 1983)

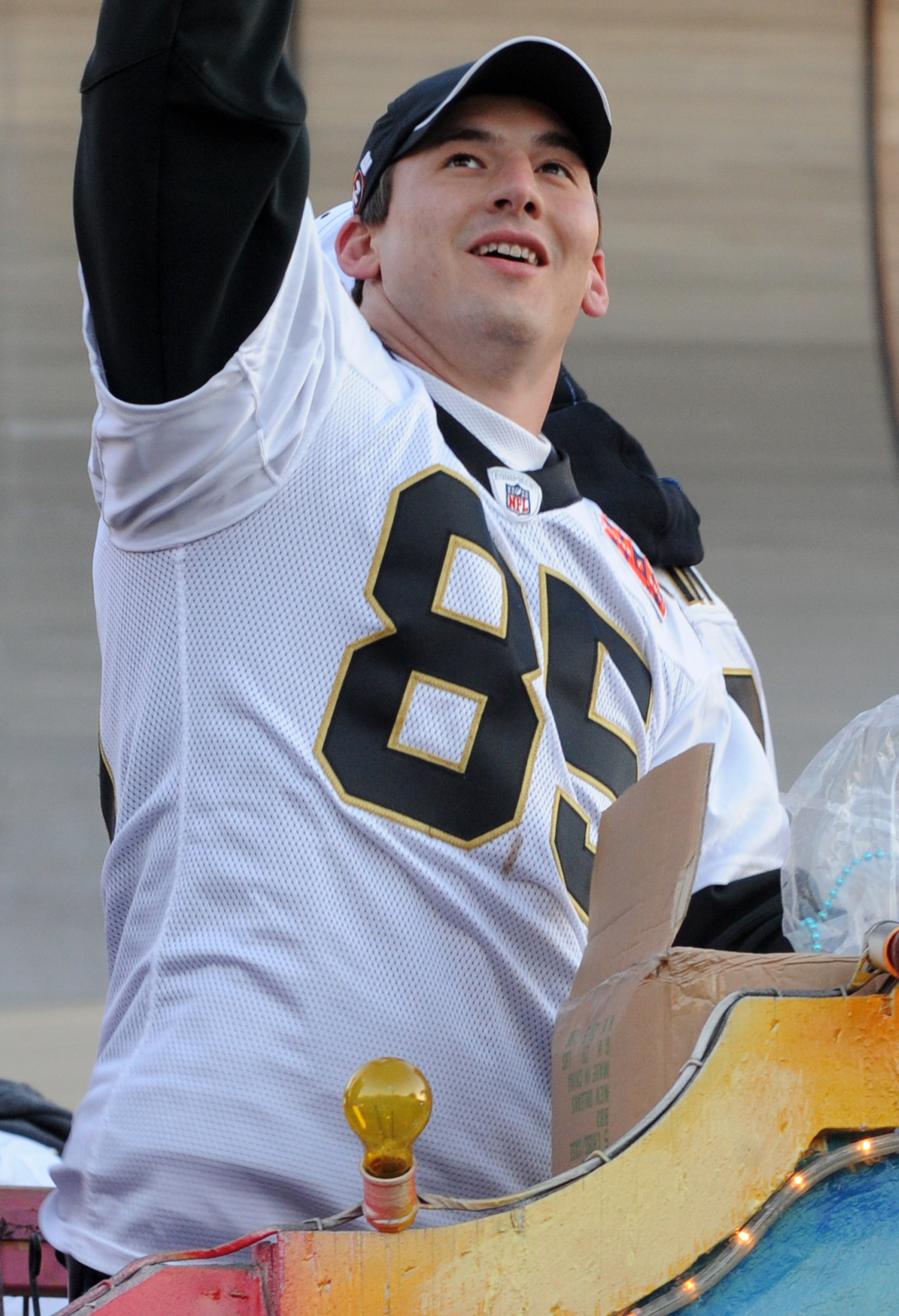
- Thomas at the Saints' Super Bowl XLIV parade

No. 85, 86
- Position: Tight end

Personal information
- Born: July 5, 1983 (age 43); Plainview, Texas, U.S.
- Listed height: 6 ft 3 in (1.91 m)
- Listed weight: 248 lb (112 kg)

Career information
- High school: Frenship (Wolfforth, Texas)
- College: Texas (2002–2005)
- NFL draft: 2006: 3rd round, 86th overall pick

Career history
- New England Patriots (2006−2008); New Orleans Saints (2009−2012)

Awards and highlights
- Super Bowl champion (XLIV); BCS national champion (2005); First-team All-Big 12 (2005); Second-team All-Big 12 (2004)

Career NFL statistics
- Receptions: 102
- Receiving yards: 938
- Receiving touchdowns: 8
- Stats at Pro Football Reference

John David Thomas (born July 5, 1983) is an American former professional football player who was a tight end in the National Football League (NFL). He was selected by the New England Patriots in the third round of the 2006 NFL draft, and also played for the New Orleans Saints. He played college football for the Texas Longhorns, where as a member of the Longhorns 2006 Rose Bowl winning squad, won the 2005 NCAA Division I-A football season national championship.

== Early life ==
Thomas attended Frenship High School in Wolfforth, Texas, and helped Frenship reach the state semi-finals in its division in 2000. Thomas excelled at linebacker, running back and tight end for the Tigers, leading to speculation about what his role would be as a college player. After a heated recruiting battle with Texas Tech University, the University of Texas secured a commitment from Thomas to play tight end for the Longhorns.

== College career ==
At Texas, Thomas broke school records for receptions, touchdowns, and yards by a tight end, as well as for receptions in a single game. He was also a candidate for the John Mackey Award, given to the nation's best tight end, and for the Draddy Trophy, for academic merit by a student athlete. In both 2004 and 2005 Thomas was named to the Academic All-Big 12 First-team for accomplishments in the classroom. Long a favorite target of quarterback Vince Young, Thomas played a prominent role in the Longhorns' 41–38 National Championship upset of then No. 1 USC in the 2006 Rose Bowl, hauling in a game-high 10 receptions for 88 yards. He majored in kinesiology.

== Professional career ==
Pre-draft measurables
Height	Weight	Arm length	Hand span	40-yard dash	10-yard split	20-yard split	20-yard shuttle	Three-cone drill	Vertical jump	Broad jump	Bench press
6 ft 3 1/8 in (1.91 m)	252 lb (114 kg)	31 5/8 in (0.80 m)	10 1/4 in (0.26 m)	4.67 s	1.64 s	2.73 s	4.34 s	7.05 s	37.5 in (0.95 m)	9 ft 5 in (2.87 m)	19 reps
All values from NFL Combine

=== New England Patriots ===
Thomas was selected by the New England Patriots in the third round of the 2006 NFL draft with the 86th overall pick. In the first 14 games of his rookie 2006 season, Thomas had only six receptions for a total of 76 yards, though three of those catches were for first downs (including his first two NFL completions which went for 29 and 11 yards, respectively). His breakout game came against the Jacksonville Jaguars in Week 16 when, filling in for an injured Benjamin Watson, Thomas caught five passes for a total of 83 yards, including his first NFL touchdown on a 22-yard pass from Tom Brady.

Thomas suffered a foot injury during the Patriots' 2007 offseason conditioning program and was placed on the team's Active/Physically Unable to Perform list for training camp and the preseason. After catching only one pass in one game played for the 2007 season, Thomas was placed on injured reserve by the Patriots on October 3, 2007, in what was suspected to be a re-aggravation of the foot injury he suffered before the start of the season. The Patriots went undefeated - during the season while Thomas was absent - until losing to the New York Giants in Super Bowl XLII.

In 2008, Thomas started 10 games as part of a two-tight end formation that also included Watson, who started 9 games. Thomas had nine catches during the season for 93 yards, but none after November 2. He was also a healthy inactive in a December 7 game against the Seattle Seahawks.

=== New Orleans Saints ===
Thomas was traded to the New Orleans Saints on September 5, 2009, in exchange for a sixth-round draft choice in the 2011 NFL draft. He had 35 receptions during the 2009 season, a career-high. The Saints would go on to win Super Bowl XLIV after defeating the Indianapolis Colts 31–17. In the Super Bowl, Thomas had 1 catch for 9 yards. On February 19, 2013, it was announced that the Saints had terminated Thomas' contract.
