= Frenship High School =

Coordinates: 33.5178°N 102.0103°W

Location
- 902 N. Dowden Rd. Wolfforth, Texas 79382; United States

Information
- School type: Public high school
- Sister school: Frenship Memorial High School
- School district: Frenship Independent School District
- Principal: Greg Hernandez
- Teaching staff: 213.83 (FTE)
- Grades: 10-12
- Enrollment: 3,383 (2023–2024)
- Student to teacher ratio: 15.82
- Colors: Royal blue, gold and white
- Athletics conference: UIL Class AAAAAA
- Mascot: Tiger
- Website: fhs.frenship.net

Frenship High School is a public high school located in Wolfforth, Texas, United States. It is classified as a 5A school by the UIL. The school serves students in grades 9–12 from Wolfforth, parts of western Lubbock, and southwest Lubbock County, as well as a small eastern portion of Hockley County. In 2015, the school was rated "Met Standard" by the Texas Education Agency.

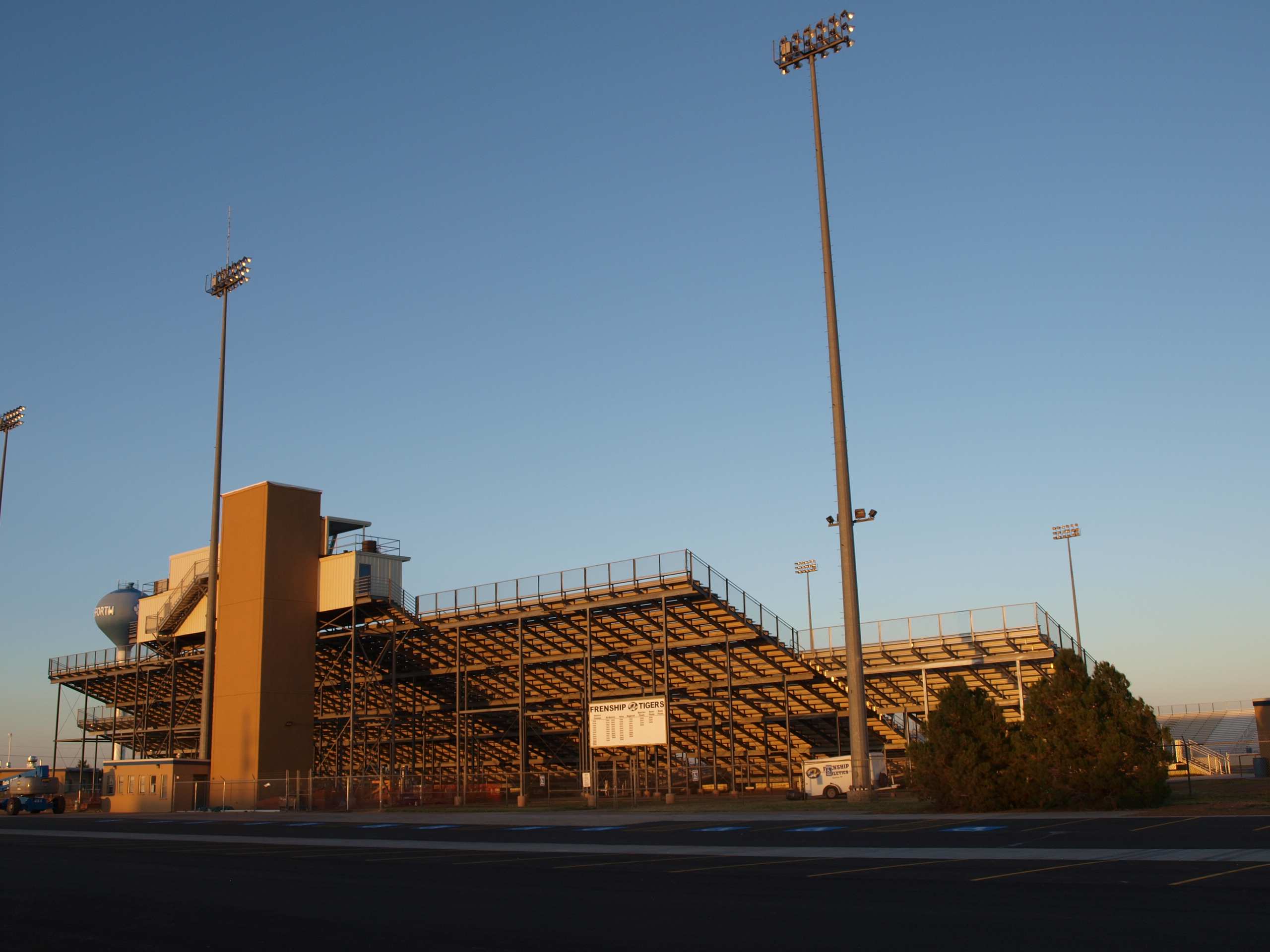
Home of the Frenship Tigers

== Naming confusion ==
When Wolfforth School District was unified with three other rural districts (Carlisle, Hurlwood and Foster) in 1935, they applied for the name "Friendship Independent School District." The application was rejected as the name was already taken by a Houston-area school district; thus, officials opted for the name Frenship.

== Curriculum ==
In January 2007, the Frenship Independent School District and South Plains College jointly created the Frenship Early College High School, which is now known as Frenship Collegiate Prep High School. The Frenship Collegiate Prep (FCP) program allows students to earn 60 hours of college credit or an associate degree while earning their high school diploma. In 2015, FISD created a new partnership with Angelo State University, enabling students to also earn college credit from there.

== Athletics ==
The Frenship Tigers compete in cross country, volleyball, football, basketball, power lifting, soccer, golf, tennis, track, softball, and baseball, bowling, and wrestling.

=== State titles ===
Boys' cross country - 2002 (4A)

== Notable alumni ==
- Kendal Briles, college football coach
- Glen Hardin, musician and songwriter; played keyboards for Elvis Presley from 1970 to 1976
- Tyler Lyons, Major League Baseball pitcher with the New York Yankees
- Donovan Smith, college football quarterback for the Texas Tech Red Raiders and the Houston Cougars
- David Swinford, Texas politician
- David Thomas, NFL tight end
- Claire Valdez, American politician and Representative-elect for New York's 7th congressional district
