= Grady Benton =

American football player (born 1973)

Profile
- Position: Quarterback

Personal information
- Born: February 20, 1973 (age 53)
- Listed height: 6 ft 3 in (1.91 m)
- Listed weight: 200 lb (91 kg)

Career information
- High school: Mesa (Mesa, Arizona)
- College: Arizona State (1991–1993); West Texas A&M (1994–1995)
- NFL draft: 1996: undrafted

Career history

Playing
- Memphis Pharaohs (1996); Texas Terror (1996)

Coaching
- Randall HS (TX) (2000–2006) Offensive coordinator; Slaton HS (TX) (2007–2011) Head coach; Haskell HS (TX) (2012–2016) Head coach

Career AFL statistics
- Comp. / Att.: 64 / 133
- Passing yards: 889
- TD–INT: 11–7
- Passer rating: 68.78
- Stats at ArenaFan.com

Grady Benton (born February 20, 1973) is an American former professional football quarterback who played one season in the Arena Football League (AFL) with the Memphis Pharaohs and Texas Terror. He first enrolled at Arizona State University before transferring to West Texas A&M University.

== Early life ==
Grady Benton was born on February 20, 1973. He played high school football at Mesa High School in Mesa, Arizona. He passed for 1,350 yards and nine touchdowns, helping Mesa win the state title his senior year in 1990.

== College career ==
Benton was initially planning on attending Mesa Community College in 1991 but ended up receiving Arizona State's last scholarship that season. He redshirted the 1991 season for the Sun Devils. He was suspended for the first game of the 1992 season after pleading no contest to using a stolen credit card. Benton became the team's starter after Garrick McGee was also suspended for the first two games of the season after pleading guilty to burglary charges. Benton completed 149 of 225 passes for 1,707 yards, eight touchdowns, and nine interceptions that season. His 66.2 completion percentage was the highest in the country. He began the 1993 season as the starter but Jake Plummer eventually took over the starting job after Benton was injured. Benton completed 63 of 132 passes (47.7%) for 760 yards, six touchdowns, and nine interceptions that season.

In 1994, Benton transferred to play for the West Texas A&M Buffaloes. He earned Dr. C.M. Frank second-team All-American and Football Gazette third-team All-American honors for the 1994 season, and also finished fifth in voting for the Harlon Hill Trophy. He led the Lone Star Conference in passing yards with 2,077 his senior year in 1995. He also played baseball for the Buffaloes during his senior season. He finished his stint at West Texas A&M with 5,618 total passing yards. Benton also set single-game school records for most pass attempts with 69 and passing touchdowns with eight. He was inducted into the West Texas A&M Hall of Champions in 2018.

== Professional career ==
Benton went undrafted during the 1996 NFL draft and spent the 1996 season in the Arena Football League (AFL). He completed 19 of 53 passes (35.8%) for 273 yards, four touchdowns, and three interceptions for the Memphis Pharaohs in 1996. He also played in eight games for the Texas Terror during the 1996 AFL season, completing 45 of 80 passes (56.2%) for 616 yards, seven touchdowns, and four interceptions.

== Coaching career ==
Benton was the offensive coordinator at Randall High School in Amarillo, Texas from 2000 to 2006. He was the head football coach at Slaton High School in Slaton, Texas from 2007 to 2011, accumulating a record of 14–36. He was the head football coach at Haskell High School in Haskell, Texas from 2012 to 2016, accumulating a record of 21–30.

== Head coaching record ==
Year	Team	Overall	Conference	Standing	Bowl/playoffs
Slaton Tigers () (2007–2011)
2007	Slaton	4–6	1–4	5th	
2008	Slaton	2–8	0–7	8th	
2009	Slaton	2–8	0–7	8th	
2010	Slaton	1–9	1–6	7th	
2011	Slaton	5–5	3–4	5th	
Slaton:		14–36	5–28		
Haskell Indians () (2012–2016)
2012	Haskell	3–7	1–4	4th	
2013	Haskell	2–8	0–4	5th	
2014	Haskell	5–5	2–3	4th	
2015	Haskell	7–4	3–2	4th	
2016	Haskell	4–6	2–3	4th	
Haskell:		21–30	8–16		
Total:		35–66			
