= Posey, Texas =

- Unincorporated community
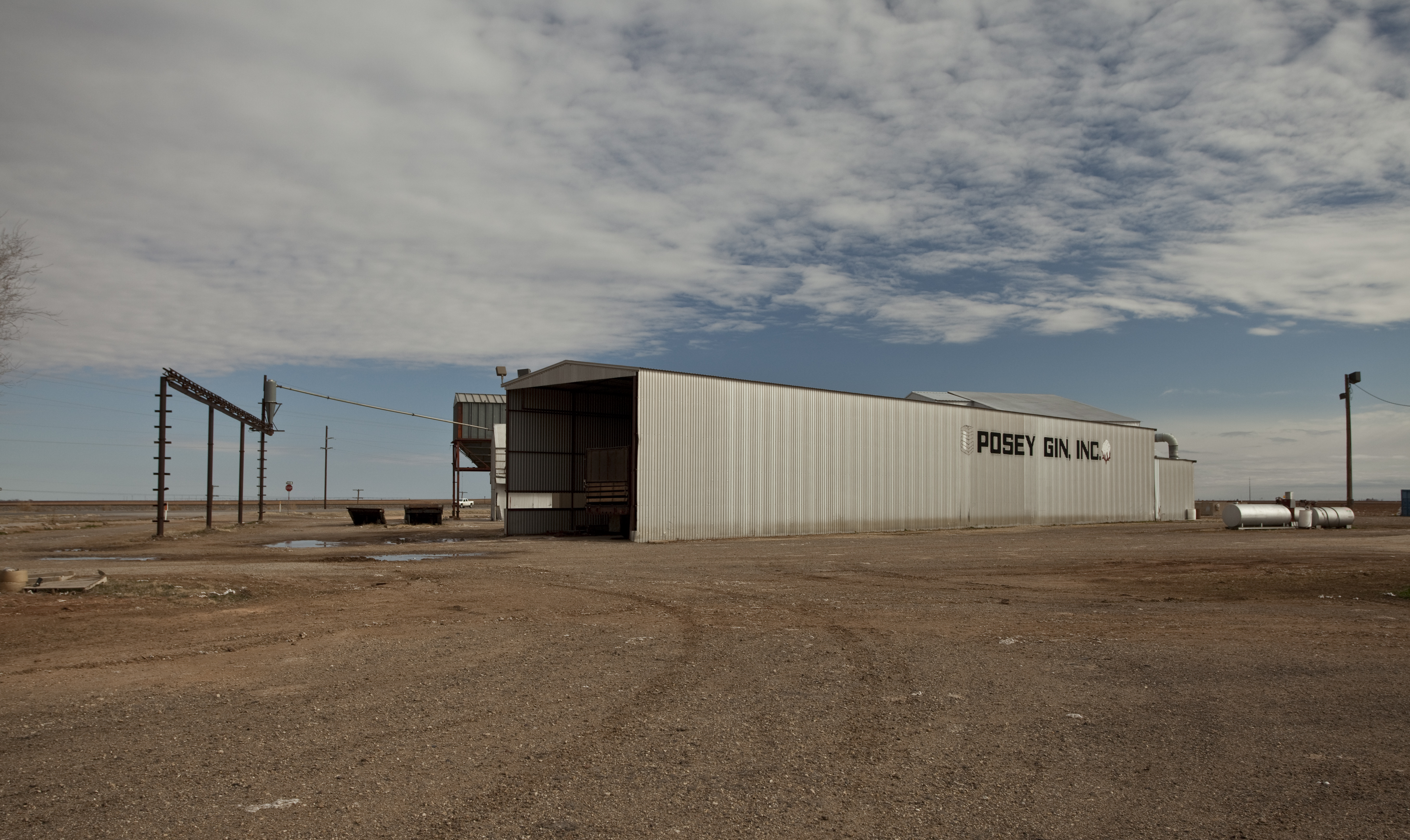
- Posey Cotton Gin

- Location within Texas Location within the United States
- Coordinates: 33°28′57″N 101°42′37″W
- Country: United States
- State: Texas
- County: Lubbock
- Region: Llano Estacado
- Established: 1936
- Founder: James B. Posey
- Elevation: 3,146 ft (959 m)

Population (2000)
  - Total: 125
- Time zone: UTC-6 (CST)
- ZIP code: 79364
- Area code: 806
- Website: Handbook of Texas

Posey is an unincorporated community located in Lubbock County, Texas, United States. According to the Handbook of Texas, the community had a population of 125 in 2000. It is located within the Lubbock metropolitan area.

== History ==
Walter Samson Posey's family donated land for a right of way for the ATKC Railroad. Subsequently, the community was named for them. It had 25 residents and three businesses in 1936, the year the community was officially established. In 1941, Posey grew to have 70 residents, a church, a grain elevator, and two businesses. Only a church and some scattered houses remained in 1975. However, the population was reported as 120 from 1952 to 1973, then to 125 from 1974 to 2000. The population further increased to 225 in 2010.

== Geography ==
Posey is on the Atchison, Topeka and Santa Fe Railway on U.S. Route 84, 11 mi (18 km) southeast of Lubbock and 6 mi (9.7 km) northwest of Slaton in southeastern Lubbock County.

== Education ==
Posey had its own school in 1941. It joined the Slaton Independent School District in the 1960s.

== Notable person ==
- Eddie Dean, Western singer and actor, was born in Posey.

== Gallery ==
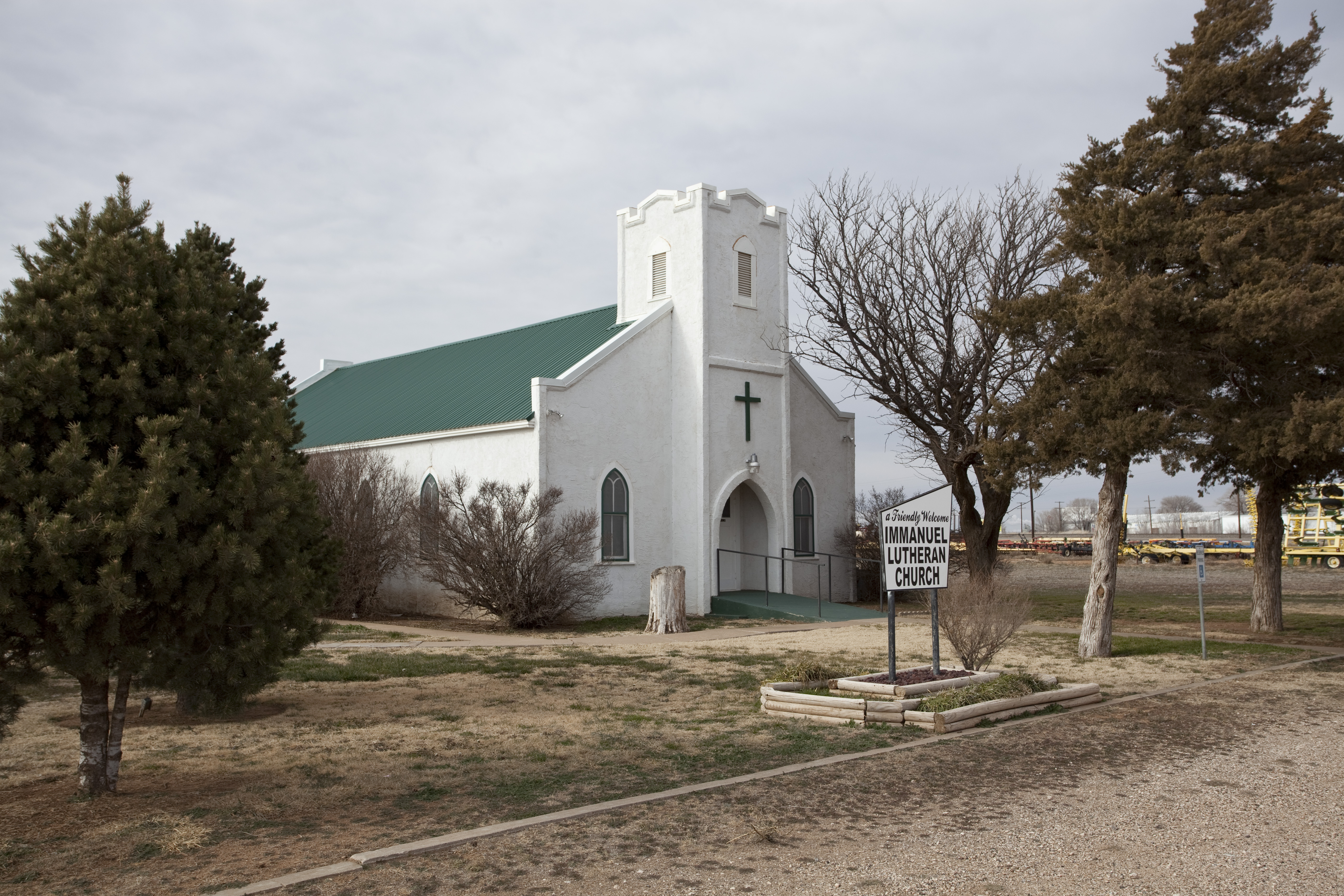
Immanuel Lutheran Church in Posey, listed on the National Register of Historic Places.
