= Hurlwood, Texas =

- Unincorporated community
- Location within Texas Location within the United States
- Coordinates: 33°34′36″N 102°2′17″W
- Country: United States
- State: Texas
- County: Lubbock
- Elevation: 3,317 ft (1,011 m)
- Time zone: UTC-6 (Central (CST))
  - Summer (DST): UTC-5 (CDT)
- Area code: 806
- GNIS feature ID: 1359848

Hurlwood is an unincorporated community in Lubbock County, Texas, United States. According to the Handbook of Texas, the community had a population of 115 in 2000. It is located within the Lubbock metropolitan area.

== History ==
The population increased to 152 in 2010.

== Geography ==
Hurlwood is located on Texas State Highway 114 on the Atchison, Topeka and Santa Fe Railway, 12 mi (19 km) west of Lubbock in western Lubbock County, near the Hockley County line.

== Education ==
Hurlwood had its own school in 1928. This and three neighboring districts joined the Frenship Independent School District in 1935.
