= FMHS =

FMHS may refer to:

- Fayetteville-Manlius High School, a public high school in Manlius, New York, USA
- Flower Mound High School, a public high school in Flower Mound, Texas, USA
- Fort Mill High School, a public high school in Fort Mill, South Carolina, USA
- Fort Myers Senior High School, a public high school in Fort Myers, Florida, USA
- Frank McCourt High School, a public high school in New York City, New York, USA
- Frenship Memorial High School, a public high school in Lubbock, Texas, USA
- Fruita Monument High School, a public high school in Fruita, Colorado, USA
