= New Deal, Texas =

Town in Lubbock County, Texas, United States

- Town
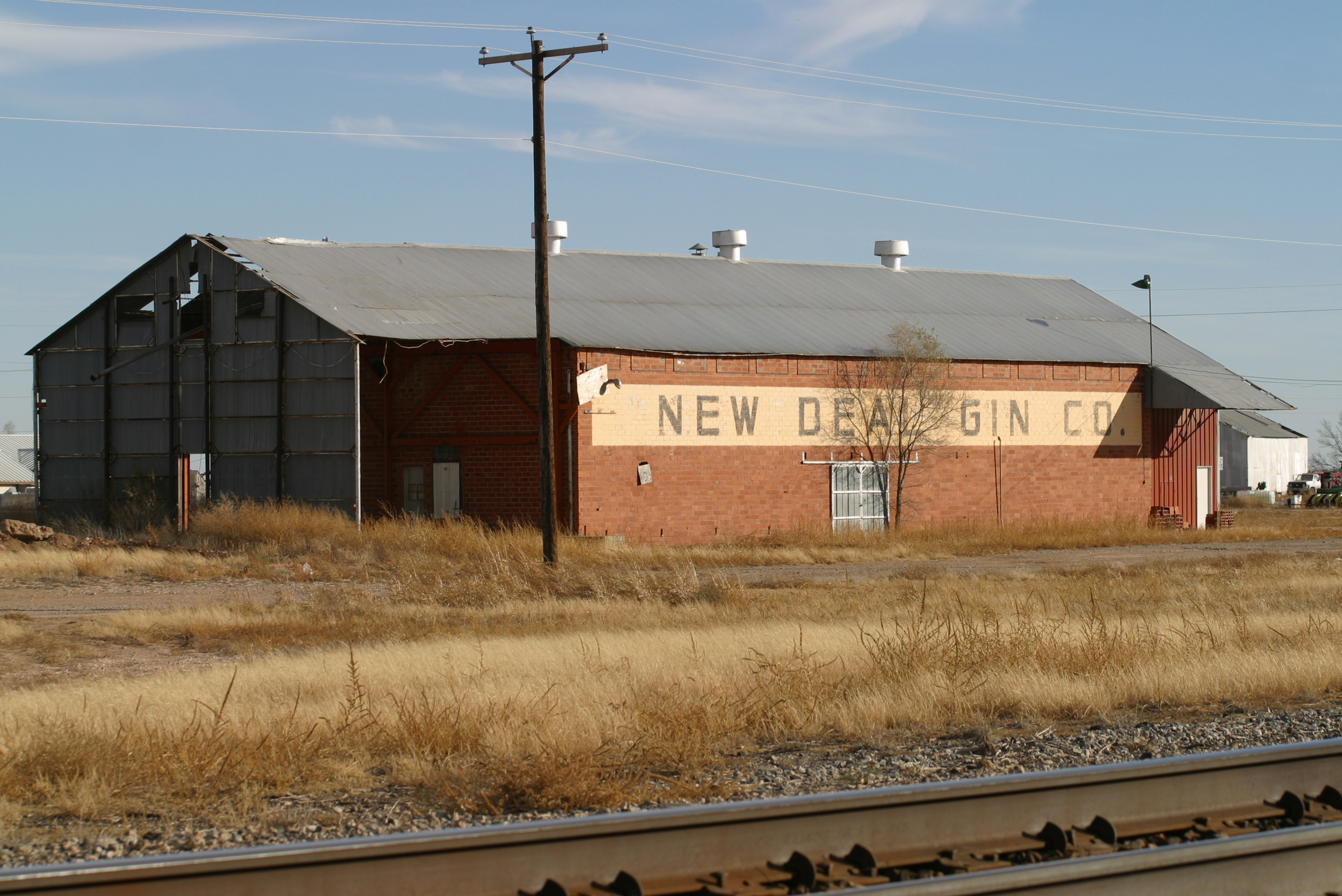
- New Deal Cotton Gin near the tracks and an aerial image of New Deal

- Location within Texas
- Coordinates: 33°44′14″N 101°50′12″W
- Country: United States
- State: Texas
- County: Lubbock
- Established: 1909

Area
  - Total: 2.33 sq mi (6.04 km^{2})
  - Land: 2.31 sq mi (5.99 km^{2})
  - Water: 0.019 sq mi (0.05 km^{2})
- Elevation: 3,300 ft (1,000 m)

Population (2020)
  - Total: 730
  - Density: 320/sq mi (120/km^{2})
- Time zone: UTC-6 (CST)
- ZIP code: 79350
- Area code: 806
- FIPS code: 48-50916
- Website: www.cityofnewdealtx.com

New Deal is a town in Lubbock County, Texas, United States. The population was 730 at the 2020 census. It is part of the Lubbock Metropolitan Statistical Area and the Llano Estacado region.

== History ==
New Deal was originally known as Monroe, named for Monroe G. Abernathy, a local landowner. The town was originally developed as a train station loading site. People began to settle there and that is why the town was built alongside the railroad tracks and highway. The train identification name for the township still reads Monroe alongside the railroad tracks. Some time afterward the town wanted a post office and requested the permit for the Monroe Postal Station. Because there was already a town in Texas with the name Monroe City, the U.S. postal department changed the name of the town to New Deal after Franklin D. Roosevelt's programs and to go along with the consolidated school system's name. This information was all developed when the school system had to write a history when applying for a federal grant. In 1970, the township was incorporated by the vote of its citizens. The city of Lubbock, Texas, was planning some annexation of surrounding lands and the people of the New Deal area decided to incorporate rather than be annexed to the city of Lubbock. A local farmer, Billy Fortenberry, was the first mayor. In 1970, Ray Edell West, a city councilman for three years, became the mayor. Under his mayoral direction in the next 7 years, the town built a City Hall and a Volunteer Fire Department building.

== Geography ==
New Deal is located on the level plains of the Llano Estacado, just to the north of Lubbock at 33°44′03″N 101°50′09″W (33.734048, –101.835862).

According to the United States Census Bureau, the town has a total area of 1.1 square miles (2.9 km^{2}), of which 0.015 square miles (0.04 km^{2}), or 1.25%, is water.

=== Climate ===
According to the Köppen Climate Classification system, New Deal has a semi-arid climate, abbreviated "BSk" on climate maps.

== Demographics ==
Historical population
Census	Pop.	Note	%±
1980	637		—
1990	521		−18.2%
2000	708		35.9%
2010	794		12.1%
2020	730		−8.1%
U.S. Decennial Census

=== 2020 census ===
New Deal racial composition (NH = Non-Hispanic) (Note: Note: the US Census treats Hispanic/Latino as an ethnic category. This table excludes Latinos from the racial categories and assigns them to a separate category. Hispanics/Latinos can be of any race.)
Race	Number	Percentage
White (NH)	413	56.58%
Black or African American (NH)	14	1.92%
Some Other Race (NH)	2	0.27%
Mixed/Multi-Racial (NH)	17	2.33%
Hispanic or Latino	284	38.9%
Total	730	

As of the 2020 United States census, there were 730 people, 360 households, and 269 families residing in the town.

=== 2000 census ===
At the 2000 census, there were 708 people, 235 households and 192 families residing in the town. The population density was 684.1 inhabitants per square mile (264.1/km^{2}). There were 262 housing units at an average density of 253.2 per square mile (97.8/km^{2}). The racial makeup of the town was 74.72% White, 0.99% African American, 0.14% Native American, 21.47% from other races, and 2.68% from two or more races. Hispanic or Latino of any race were 41.10% of the population.

There were 235 households, of which 46.8% had children under the age of 18 living with them, 62.1% were married couples living together, 14.5% had a female householder with no husband present, and 17.9% were non-families. 16.2% of all households were made up of individuals, and 5.1% had someone living alone who was 65 years of age or older. The average household size was 3.01 and the average family size was 3.35.

Age distribution was 34.2% under the age of 18, 9.5% from 18 to 24, 30.2% from 25 to 44, 17.7% from 45 to 64, and 8.5% who were 65 years of age or older. The median age was 30 years. For every 100 females, there were 104.6 males. For every 100 females age 18 and over, there were 87.1 males.

The median household income was $38,077, and the median family income was $40,573. Males had a median income of $25,625 versus $19,091 for females. The per capita income for the town was $12,695. About 11.8% of families and 15.3% of the population were below the poverty line, including 25.6% of those under age 18 and 19.8% of those age 65 or over.

== Education ==
The Town of New Deal is served by the New Deal Independent School District. The school system was segregated until fall 1968. The school system was originally known as Monroe Schools but, in later years, as small school systems began to close, the Monroe schools incorporated with several others and took the name of the New Deal Consolidated Schools.

== See also ==
- List of municipalities in Texas
- BNSF Railway
- Llano Estacado
- Blackwater Draw
- National Register of Historic Places listings in Lubbock County, Texas
