= Lubbock County Courthouse =

Courthouse in Texas

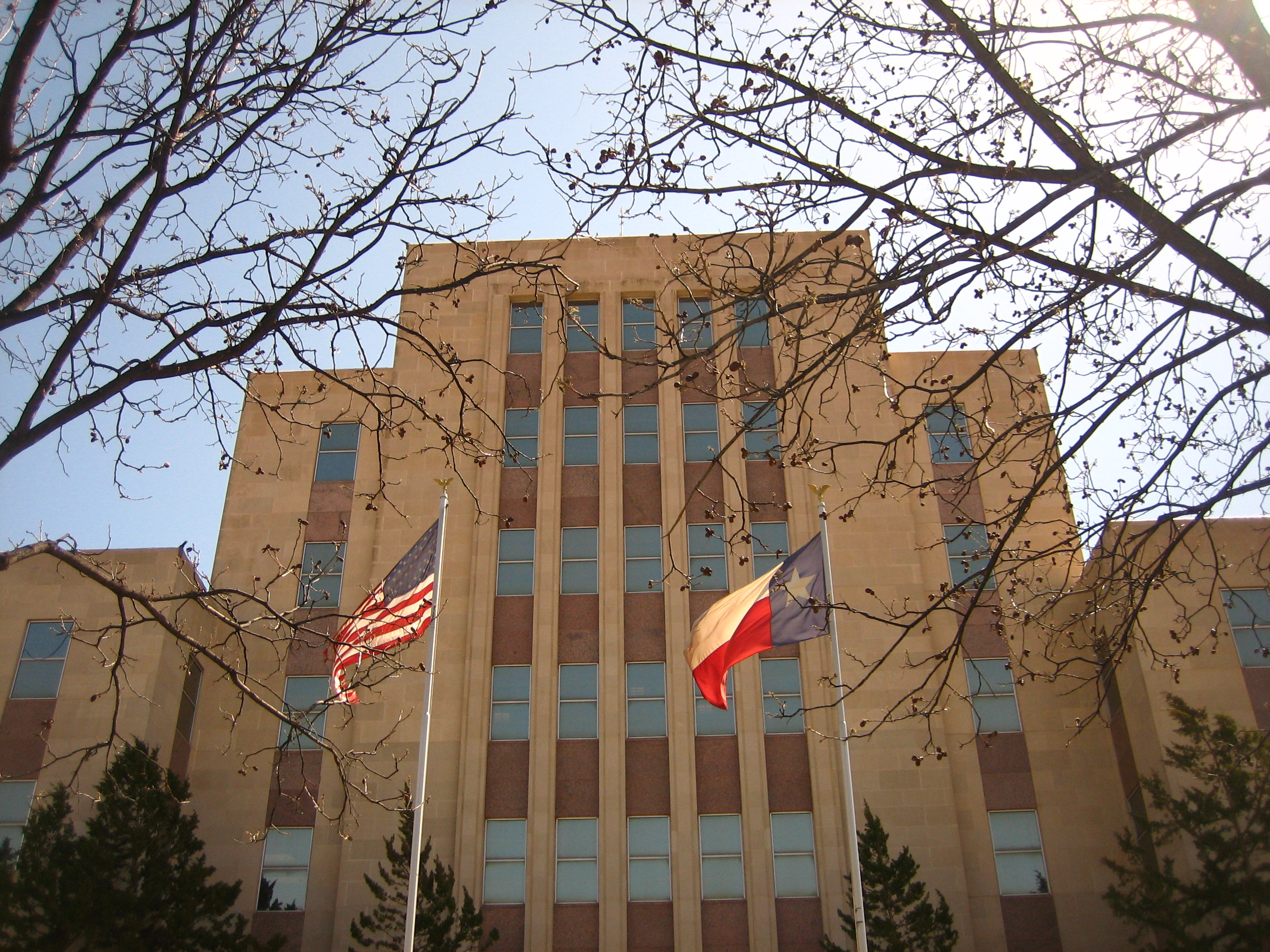
- Lubbock County Courthouse

- Location within Texas Location within the United States
- Interactive map showing the location of Lubbock County Courthouse

General information
- Architectural style: Modern
- Location: Lubbock
- Coordinates: 33°35′06″N 101°50′39″W
- Opened: 1950
- Owner: Lubbock County

Design and construction
- Architects: Haynes & Kirby

The Lubbock County Courthouse is located in Lubbock, Texas. It is the county's third courthouse.

== History ==
The first courthouse in the county was designed by Gill, Woodward & Gill, and was completed it 1891. The courthouse was described as being Italianate in design, however a windstorm in 1895 destroyed many of the ornate features.

In 1915, due to population growth, a new courthouse designed by Rose & Peterson was constructed.

The second courthouse was demolished in 1968 with the current courthouse being constructed in 1950.
