= Liberty, Lubbock County, Texas =

- Unincorporated community
- Location within Texas Location within the United States
- Coordinates: 33°41′38″N 101°46′2″W
- Country: United States
- State: Texas
- County: Lubbock
- Elevation: 3,261 ft (994 m)
- Time zone: UTC-6 (Central (CST))
  - Summer (DST): UTC-5 (CDT)
- Area code: 806
- GNIS feature ID: 1380082

Liberty is an unincorporated community in Lubbock County, Texas, United States. According to the Handbook of Texas, the community had a population of 10 in 2000. It is located within the Lubbock metropolitan area.

== Geography ==
Liberty is located on Farm to Market Road 1294, 8 mi (13 km) northwest of Idalou and 12 mi (19 km) northeast of Lubbock in north-central Lubbock County.

== Education ==
Liberty is served by the Idalou Independent School District.
