= Canyon, Lubbock County, Texas =

- Unincorporated community
- Location within Texas Location within the United States
- Coordinates: 33°35′34″N 101°43′54″W
- Country: United States
- State: Texas
- County: Lubbock
- Elevation: 3,156 ft (962 m)
- Time zone: UTC-6 (Central (CST))
  - Summer (DST): UTC-5 (CDT)
- Area code: 806
- GNIS feature ID: 1353771

Canyon is an unincorporated community in Lubbock County, Texas, United States. According to the Handbook of Texas, the community had a population of 40 in 2000. It is located within the Lubbock metropolitan area.

== Geography ==
Canyon is located at the intersection of Farm to Market Roads 1729 and 40, 6 mi (9.7 km) east of Lubbock in east-central Lubbock County.

== Education ==
In 1935 it became part of the Roosevelt Independent School District.
