= Lubbock County, Texas =

County in Texas, United States

- County
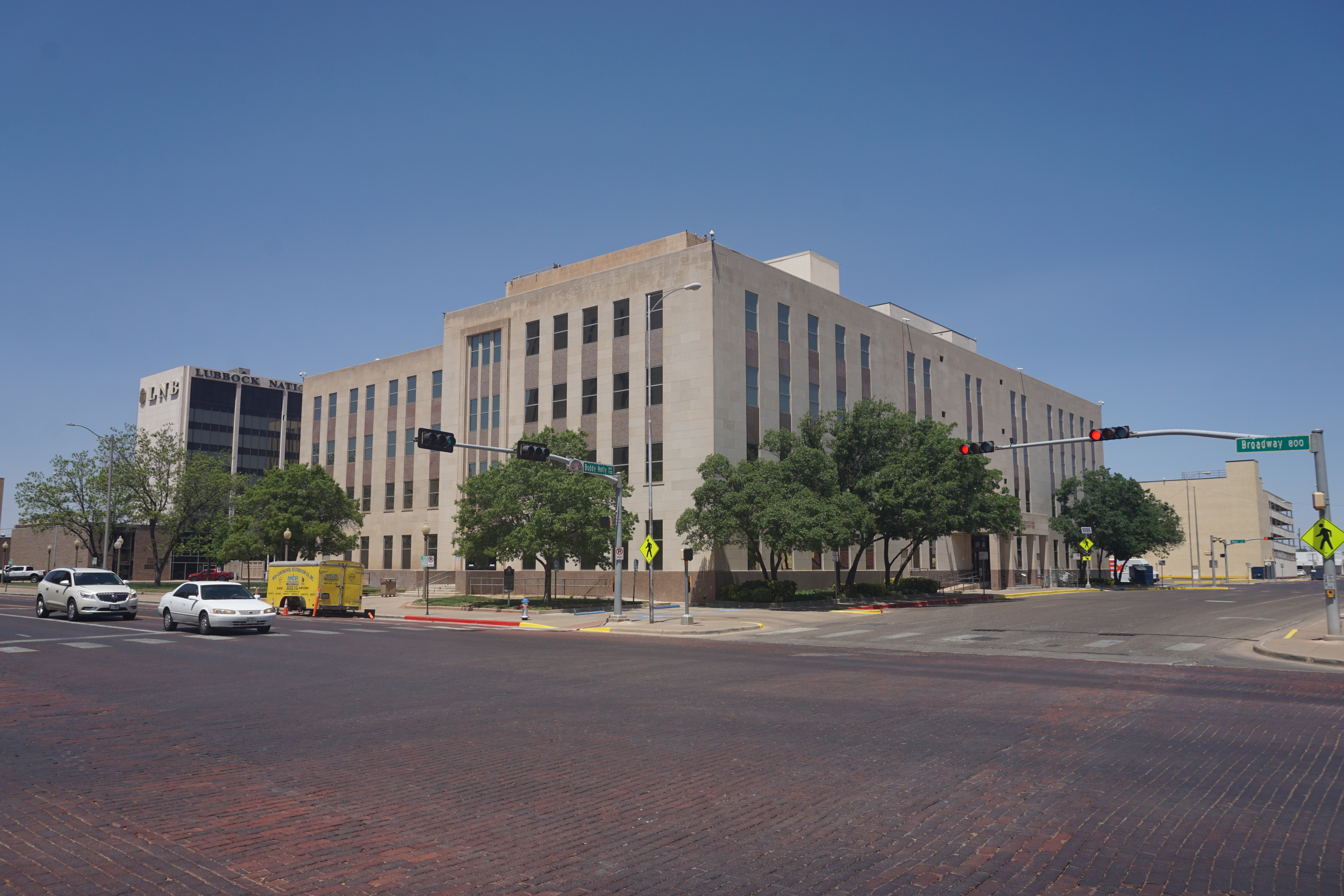
- The current Lubbock County Courthouse

- Location within the U.S. state of Texas
- Coordinates: 33°37′N 101°49′W
- Country: United States
- State: Texas
- Founded: 1891
- Named for: Thomas Saltus Lubbock
- Seat: Lubbock
- Largest city: Lubbock

Area
  - Total: 901 sq mi (2,330 km^{2})
  - Land: 896 sq mi (2,320 km^{2})
  - Water: 5.1 sq mi (13 km^{2}) 0.6%

Population (2020)
  - Total: 310,639
  - Estimate (2025): 328,906 ▲
  - Density: 347/sq mi (134/km^{2})
- Time zone: UTC−6 (Central)
  - Summer (DST): UTC−5 (CDT)
- Congressional district: 19th
- Website: www.lubbockcounty.gov

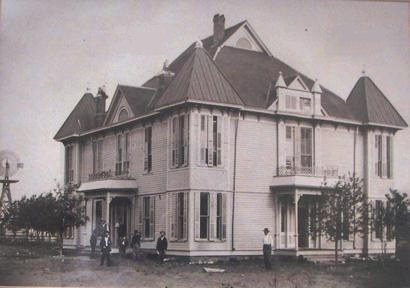
The first Lubbock County Courthouse was used from 1891 to 1916.

The second Lubbock County Courthouse remained open until 1968, though a third courthouse had been built in 1950.

Lubbock County is a county located in the U.S. state of Texas. The 2020 census placed the population at 310,639. Its county seat and largest city is Lubbock. The county was created in 1876 and organized in 1891. It is named for Thomas Saltus Lubbock, a Confederate colonel and Texas Ranger (some sources give his first name as Thompson).

Lubbock County, along with Crosby County, and Lynn County, is part of the Lubbock Metropolitan Statistical Area (MSA). The Lubbock MSA and Levelland Micropolitan Statistical Area, encompassing only Hockley County, form the larger Lubbock–Levelland Combined Statistical Area.

== Geography ==
According to the U.S. Census Bureau, the county has a total area of 901 square miles (2,330 km^{2}), of which 896 square miles (2,320 km^{2}) are land and 5.1 square miles (13 km^{2}) (0.6%) are covered by water.

=== Major highways ===
- Interstate 27
- U.S. Route 62/U.S. Route 82
- U.S. Route 84
- U.S. Route 87
- State Highway 114
- Loop 88
- Loop 193
- Loop 289
- Loop 369
- Loop 388
- Loop 461
- Loop 493
- Spur 309
- Spur 326
- Spur 327
- Spur 331

=== Adjacent counties ===
- Hale County (north)
- Crosby County (east)
- Lynn County (south)
- Hockley County (west)
- Lamb County (northwest)
- Terry County (southwest)
- Garza County (southeast)
- Floyd County (northeast)

== Demographics ==
=== Racial and ethnic composition ===
Historical population
Census	Pop.	Note	%±
1880	25		—
1890	33		32.0%
1900	293		787.9%
1910	3,624		1,136.9%
1920	11,096		206.2%
1930	39,104		252.4%
1940	51,782		32.4%
1950	101,048		95.1%
1960	156,271		54.7%
1970	179,295		14.7%
1980	211,651		18.0%
1990	222,636		5.2%
2000	242,628		9.0%
2010	278,831		14.9%
2020	310,639		11.4%
2025 (est.)	328,906	▲	5.9%
U.S. Decennial Census; 1850–2010 2010 2020

Lubbock County, Texas – Racial and ethnic composition Note: the US Census treats Hispanic/Latino as an ethnic category. This table excludes Latinos from the racial categories and assigns them to a separate category. Hispanics/Latinos may be of any race.
Race / Ethnicity	Pop 2000	Pop 2010	Pop 2020	% 2000	% 2010	% 2020
White alone	151,705	159,815	191,717	62.53%	57.32%	51.72%
Black or African American alone	18,184	19,957	27,279	7.49%	7.16%	8.78%
Native American or Alaska Native alone	815	1,026	3,206	0.34%	0.37%	1.03%
Asian alone	3,081	5,650	9,701	1.27%	2.03%	3.12%
Pacific Islander alone	49	161	248	0.02%	0.06%	0.08%
Other race alone	146	284	35,180	0.06%	0.10%	11.33%
Mixed race or Multiracial	2,039	3,014	43,308	0.84%	1.08%	13.94%
Hispanic or Latino (any race)	66,609	88,924	109,170	27.45%	31.89%	35.14%
Total	242,628	278,831	310,639	100.00%	100.00%	100.00%

=== 2020 census ===
As of the 2020 census, the county had a population of 310,639. The median age was 33.0 years. 23.5% of residents were under the age of 18 and 13.8% of residents were 65 years of age or older. For every 100 females there were 96.6 males, and for every 100 females age 18 and over there were 94.5 males age 18 and over.

The racial makeup of the county was 61.7% White, 8.8% Black or African American, 1.0% American Indian and Alaska Native, 3.1% Asian, 0.1% Native Hawaiian and Pacific Islander, 11.3% from some other race, and 13.9% from two or more races. Hispanic or Latino residents of any race comprised 35.1% of the population.

89.5% of residents lived in urban areas, while 10.5% lived in rural areas.

There were 119,463 households in the county, of which 31.2% had children under the age of 18 living in them. Of all households, 42.8% were married-couple households, 20.9% were households with a male householder and no spouse or partner present, and 29.3% were households with a female householder and no spouse or partner present. About 28.6% of all households were made up of individuals and 9.5% had someone living alone who was 65 years of age or older.

There were 132,209 housing units, of which 9.6% were vacant. Among occupied housing units, 54.9% were owner-occupied and 45.1% were renter-occupied. The homeowner vacancy rate was 1.5% and the rental vacancy rate was 11.8%.

=== 2000 census ===
As of the 2000 census, 242,628 people, 92,516 households, and 60,135 families resided in the county. The population density was 270 people per square mile (100 people/km^{2}). The 100,595 housing units averaged 112 units per square mile (43/km^{2}). The racial makeup of the county was 74.30% White, 7.67% Black or African American, 0.59% Native American, 1.31% Asian, 0.04% Pacific Islander, 14.15% from other races, and 1.96% from two or more races. About 27.45% of the population was Hispanic or Latino of any race.

Of the 92,516 households, 31.70% had children under the age of 18 living with them, 48.20% were married couples living together, 12.60% had a female householder with no husband present, and 35.00% were not families. About 26.90% of all households were made up of individuals, and 7.90% had someone living alone who was 65 years of age or older. The average household size was 2.52 and the average family size was 3.10.

In the county, the population was distributed as 25.70% under the age of 18, 16.30% from 18 to 24, 27.90% from 25 to 44, 19.20% from 45 to 64, and 11.00% who were 65 years of age or older. The median age was 30 years. For every 100 females, there were 95.80 males. For every 100 females age 18 and over, there were 92.60 males.

The median income for a household in the county was $32,198, and for a family was $41,067. Males had a median income of $29,961 versus $21,591 for females. The per capita income for the county was $17,323. About 12.00% of families and 17.80% of the population were below the poverty line, including 21.60% of those under age 18 and 10.70% of those age 65 or over.

== Elected leadership ==
Legislative Representation	Name	Service
United States Congress, District 19	Jodey Arrington	2017 – Present
State Senator, District 28	Charles Perry	2014 – Present
State Representative, District 83	Dustin Burrows	2015 – Present
State Representative, District 84	Carl Tepper	2023 – Present

County Elected Leadership	Name	Service
County Judge	Curtis Parrish	2019 – present
County Commissioner Pct 1	Mike Dalby	2025 – present
County Commissioner Pct 2	Jason Corley	2019 – present
County Commissioner Pct 3	Cary Shaw	2025 - present
County Commissioner Pct 4	Jordan Rackler	2023 – present
District Attorney	K. Sunshine Stanek	2018 – present
District Clerk	Sara Smith	2022 – present
County Clerk	Kelly Pinon	2007 – present
County Sheriff	Kelly Rowe	2009 – present
County Tax Assessor-collector	Ronnie Keister	2009 – present
County Treasurer	Chris Winn	2015 – present

== Politics ==
Unusual for an urban county, and one featuring a major state university, Lubbock County is strongly conservative. At the presidential level, Lubbock County votes predominantly Republican, having voted Democratic for president only once in the past 70 years, a trend which began with native son Dwight D. Eisenhower heading the ticket in 1952 and 1956, reversing a trend typical of the Solid South. In the 2020 Presidential election, Joe Biden's percentage (a best for a Democrat since 1976), was due to Biden winning precincts within the city highway loop in Lubbock. The heavy Republican lean of the county is mostly due to Republican landslide victories in precincts located outside the city highway loop in the county. The last Democrat to carry Lubbock County in a gubernatorial race was Preston Smith in 1970, a Lubbock resident.

In October 2023, Lubbock County Commissioners passed a "Sanctuary County for the Unborn" ordinance. The ordinance outlaws "the act of transporting another person along their roads for an abortion." The ordinance is of questionable constitutionality, given the right to interstate travel under the U.S. Constitution.

Lubbock County contains parts of District 83 and parts of District 84 for representation in the Texas House of Representatives. Lubbock County is located within District 28 of the Texas Senate.

United States presidential election results for Lubbock County, Texas
Year	Republican		Democratic		Third party(ies)	
Year	No.	%	No.	%	No.	%
1912	16	3.73%	366	85.31%	47	10.96%
1916	34	4.87%	633	90.69%	31	4.44%
1920	204	14.05%	1,180	81.27%	68	4.68%
1924	411	17.54%	1,740	74.26%	192	8.19%
1928	3,079	60.79%	1,979	39.07%	7	0.14%
1932	590	9.91%	5,330	89.53%	33	0.55%
1936	622	8.81%	6,425	90.97%	16	0.23%
1940	1,283	13.63%	8,113	86.19%	17	0.18%
1944	1,169	10.77%	7,654	70.50%	2,033	18.73%
1948	2,837	18.66%	11,114	73.08%	1,256	8.26%
1952	16,137	57.95%	11,650	41.84%	58	0.21%
1956	13,970	52.57%	12,540	47.19%	66	0.25%
1960	20,065	56.35%	15,340	43.08%	202	0.57%
1964	17,372	44.02%	22,057	55.89%	34	0.09%
1968	25,646	51.13%	15,430	30.77%	9,078	18.10%
1972	43,564	73.47%	15,353	25.89%	379	0.64%
1976	38,478	60.40%	24,797	38.92%	432	0.68%
1980	46,711	68.83%	18,732	27.60%	2,424	3.57%
1984	57,151	74.98%	18,793	24.66%	275	0.36%
1988	50,760	69.26%	22,202	30.29%	330	0.45%
1992	48,847	58.95%	22,240	26.84%	11,771	14.21%
1996	47,304	63.50%	22,786	30.59%	4,399	5.91%
2000	56,054	73.75%	18,469	24.30%	1,485	1.95%
2004	70,135	75.29%	22,472	24.12%	544	0.58%
2008	66,304	67.98%	30,486	31.26%	744	0.76%
2012	63,469	69.61%	26,271	28.81%	1,444	1.58%
2016	65,651	66.31%	28,023	28.30%	5,339	5.39%
2020	78,861	65.27%	40,017	33.12%	1,939	1.60%
2024	86,547	69.22%	37,148	29.71%	1,343	1.07%

United States Senate election results for Lubbock County, Texas1
Year	Republican		Democratic		Third party(ies)	
Year	No.	%	No.	%	No.	%
2024	83,643	67.20%	37,560	30.18%	3,266	2.62%

United States Senate election results for Lubbock County, Texas2
Year	Republican		Democratic		Third party(ies)	
Year	No.	%	No.	%	No.	%
2020	79,459	66.49%	36,319	30.39%	3,726	3.12%
2026	59,695	57.22%	42,444	40.68%	2,195	2.10%

Texas Gubernatorial election results for Lubbock County
Year	Republican		Democratic		Third party(ies)	
Year	No.	%	No.	%	No.	%
2022	58,163	69.43%	24,497	29.24%	1,108	1.32%
2026	61,949	59.32%	40,574	38.85%	1,904	1.82%

== Communities ==
=== Cities ===
- Abernathy (mostly in Hale County)
- Idalou
- Lubbock (county seat)
- Shallowater
- Wolfforth

=== Towns ===
- New Deal
- Ransom Canyon
- Slaton

=== Village ===
- Buffalo Springs

=== Unincorporated communities ===
- Acuff
- Becton
- Canyon
- Estacado (partly in Crosby County)
- Hurlwood
- Liberty
- Posey
- Reese Center
- Reese Air Force Base (Defunct)
- Roosevelt
- Slide
- Woodrow

=== Ghost towns ===
- Broadview
- Carlisle
- Heckville
- Kitalou
- Midway
- Reese Village
- Union

== Education ==
School districts serving the county include:

- Abernathy Independent School District
- Lubbock-Cooper Independent School District
- Frenship Independent School District
- Idalou Independent School District
- Lorenzo Independent School District
- Lubbock Independent School District
- New Deal Independent School District
- Roosevelt Independent School District
- Shallowater Independent School District
- Slaton Independent School District
- Southland Independent School District

The county is in the service area of South Plains College.

Texas Tech University is in Lubbock.

== See also ==
- Caprock Escarpment
- List of museums in West Texas
- Llano Estacado
- National Register of Historic Places listings in Lubbock County, Texas
- Recorded Texas Historic Landmarks in Lubbock County
- West Texas
- Yellow House Canyon
- Yellow House Draw
