= New Deal Independent School District =

School district in Texas

New Deal Independent School District is a public school district classified as 2A by the UIL based in New Deal, Texas (USA).

In addition to New Deal, it includes a northern portion of Lubbock.

There are three schools in the district – New Deal High (Grades 9-12), New Deal Middle (Grades 5-8), and New Deal Elementary (Grades PK-4).

The district began in 1917 as the Monroe School District. In 1935, the schools of Monroe, Caldwell, Grovesville, and Center were consolidated into one larger school. As the consolidation occurred during President Franklin Delano Roosevelt's New Deal administration, the combined district (and later the community) adopted the name "New Deal".

In 2009, the school district was rated "recognized" by the Texas Education Agency.

New Deal's longest running Superintendent was Jimmy Noland. New Deal's current Superintendent is Matt Reed.
