= Frenship Memorial High School =

Public secondary school in Lubbock, Texas, U.S.

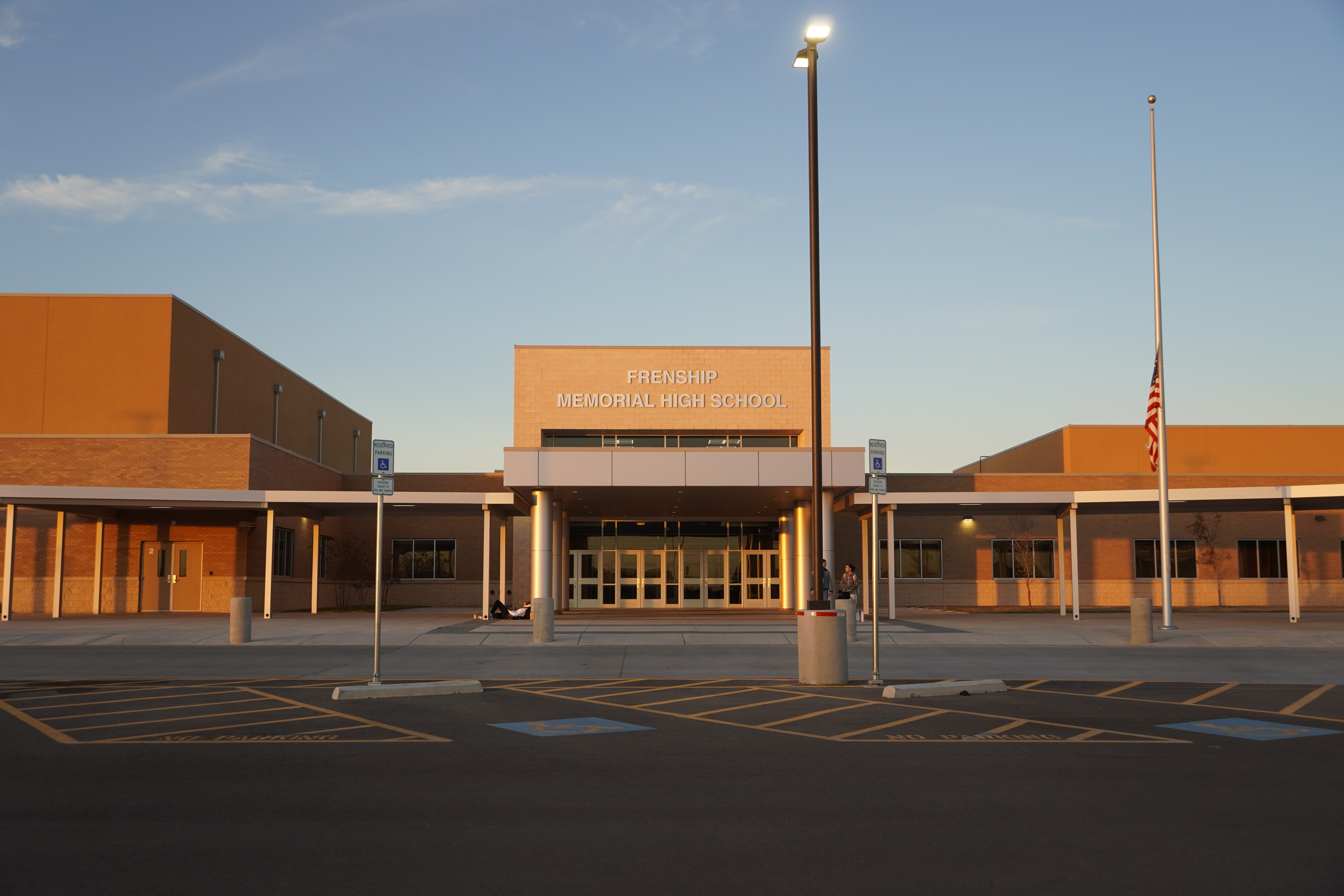
- Frenship Memorial High School in November 2025

Location
- 7012 43rd Drive; Lubbock, United States of America, Texas 79407; United States
- 33°33′21″N 101°58′05″W

Information
- Type: Public secondary school
- Established: August 13, 2025; 10 months ago
- Sister school: Frenship High School
- School district: Frenship Independent School District
- Enrollment: 2,194
- Athletics conference: University Interscholastic League 5A
- Mascot: Panthers
- Website: memorial.frenship.net

Frenship Memorial High School is a public high school located in Lubbock, Texas, United States of America, which opened in August 2025.

The school serves students in grades 9-12, and opened its first year with only freshmen and sophomores, adding a grade each year until it reaches all grades.

As one of the fastest growing school districts in the state, a bond passed by voters in 2020 paved the way to allow the district to build the school, which is the second high school in the district, joining Frenship High School.

The school was named in January 2024 to honor the founders of Frenship. The school's mascot (Panthers) and colors (two shades of blue) were chosen in April 2024 by students at the middle schools that would send the first students to the school.

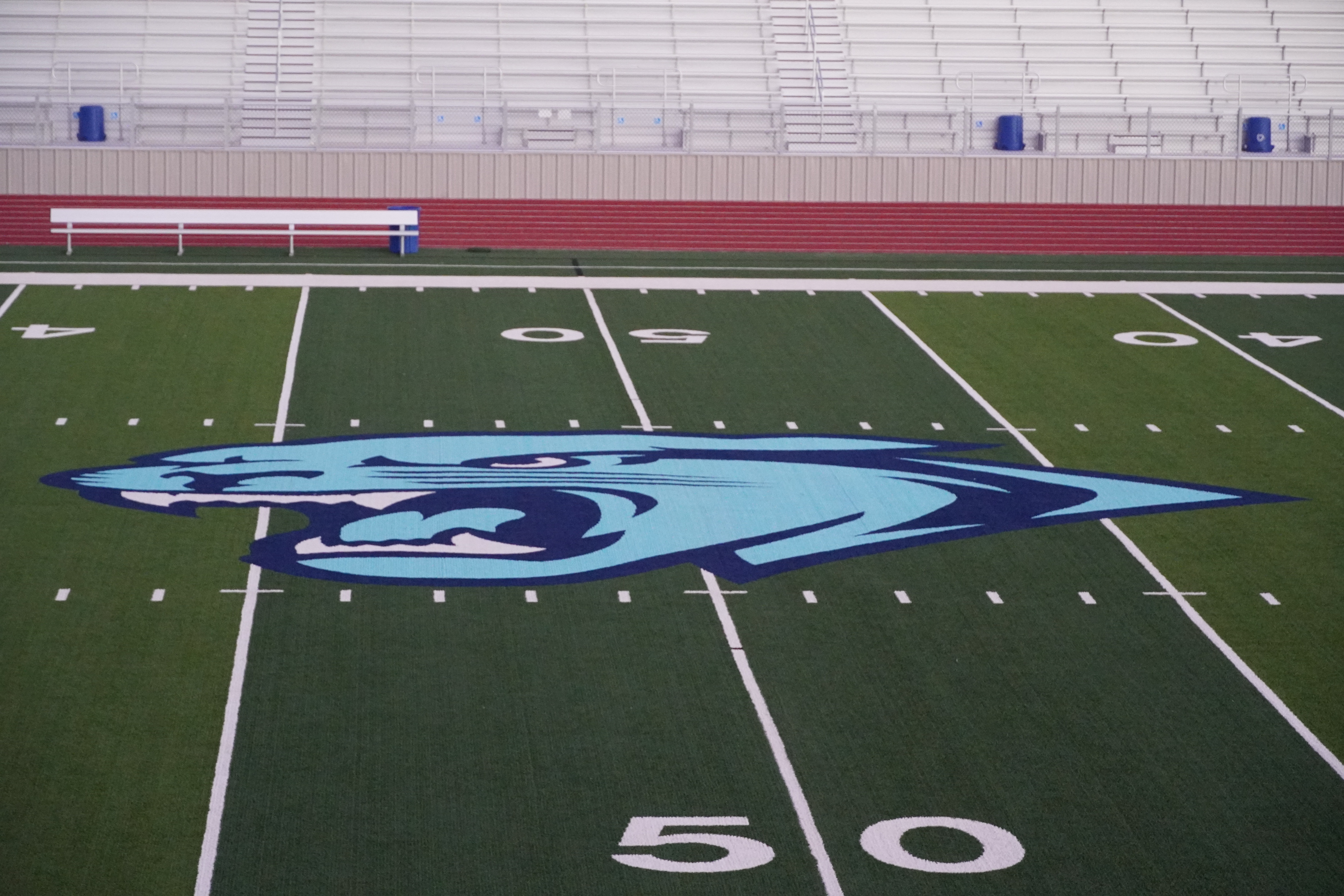
School logo on football field

It is classified as a 5A-D1 school by the University Scholastic League. The school opened competing in the University Interscholastic League in all sports except football, since no upperclassmen were part of the first year of the school.
