= Slaton, Texas =

- City
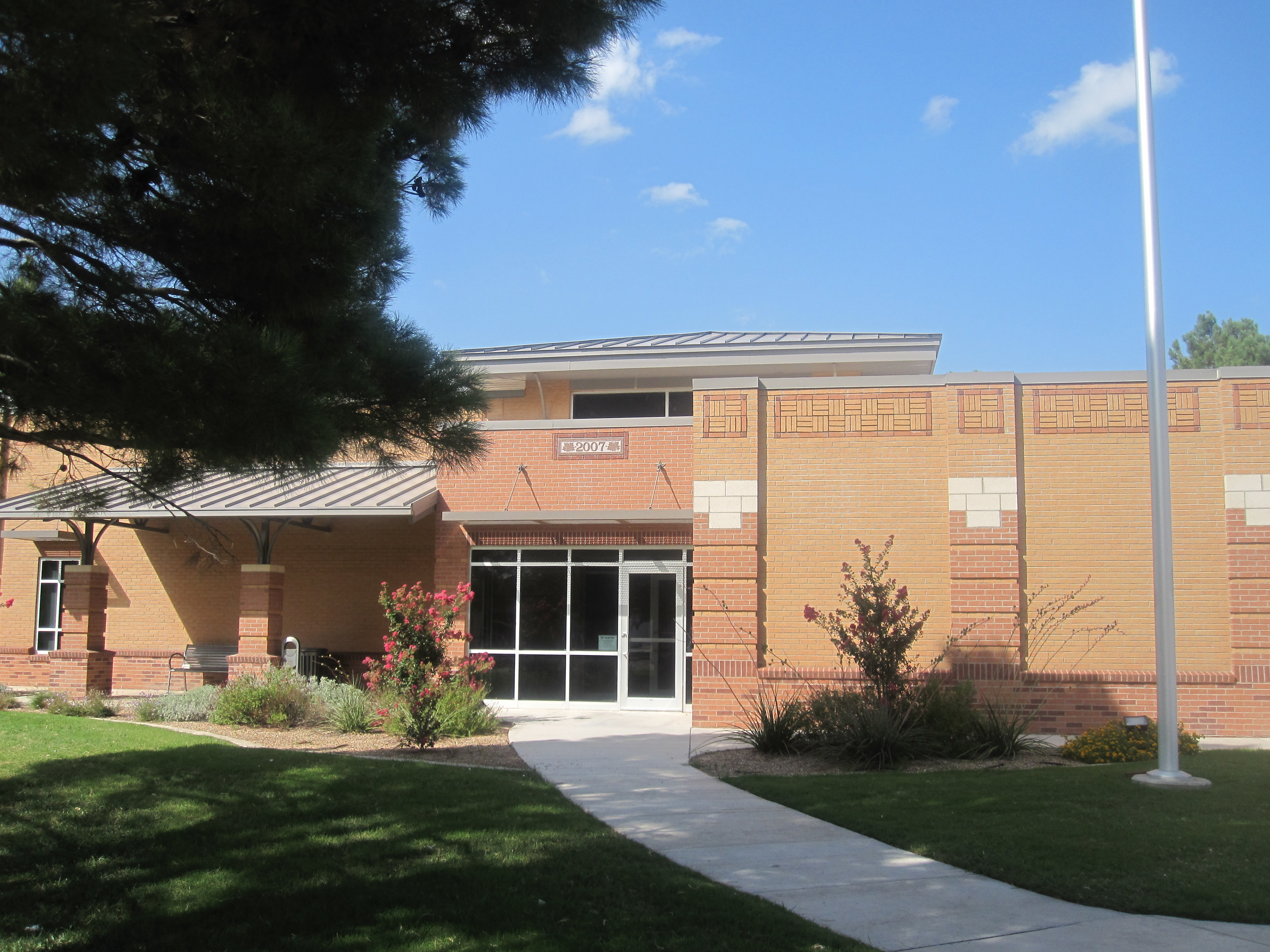
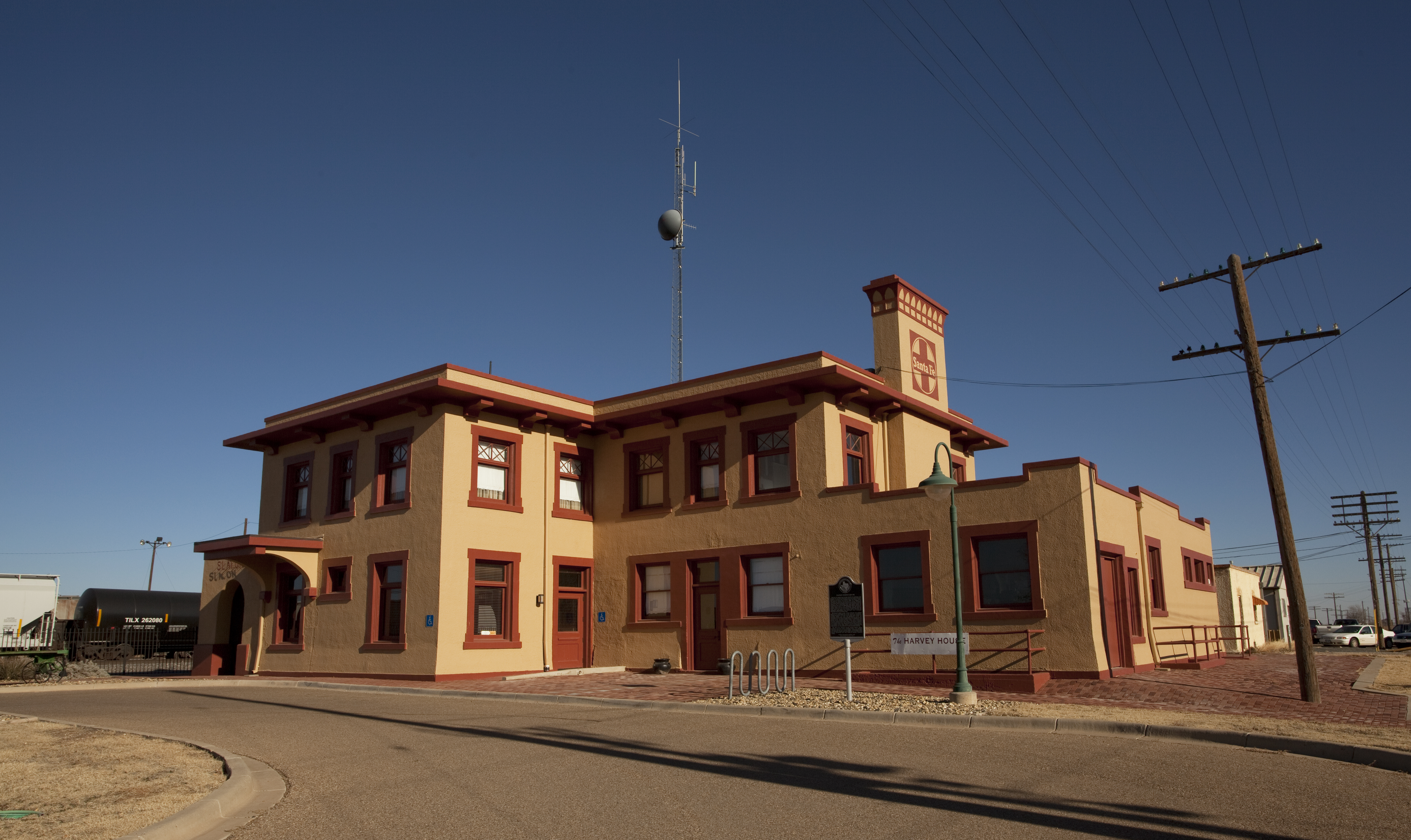
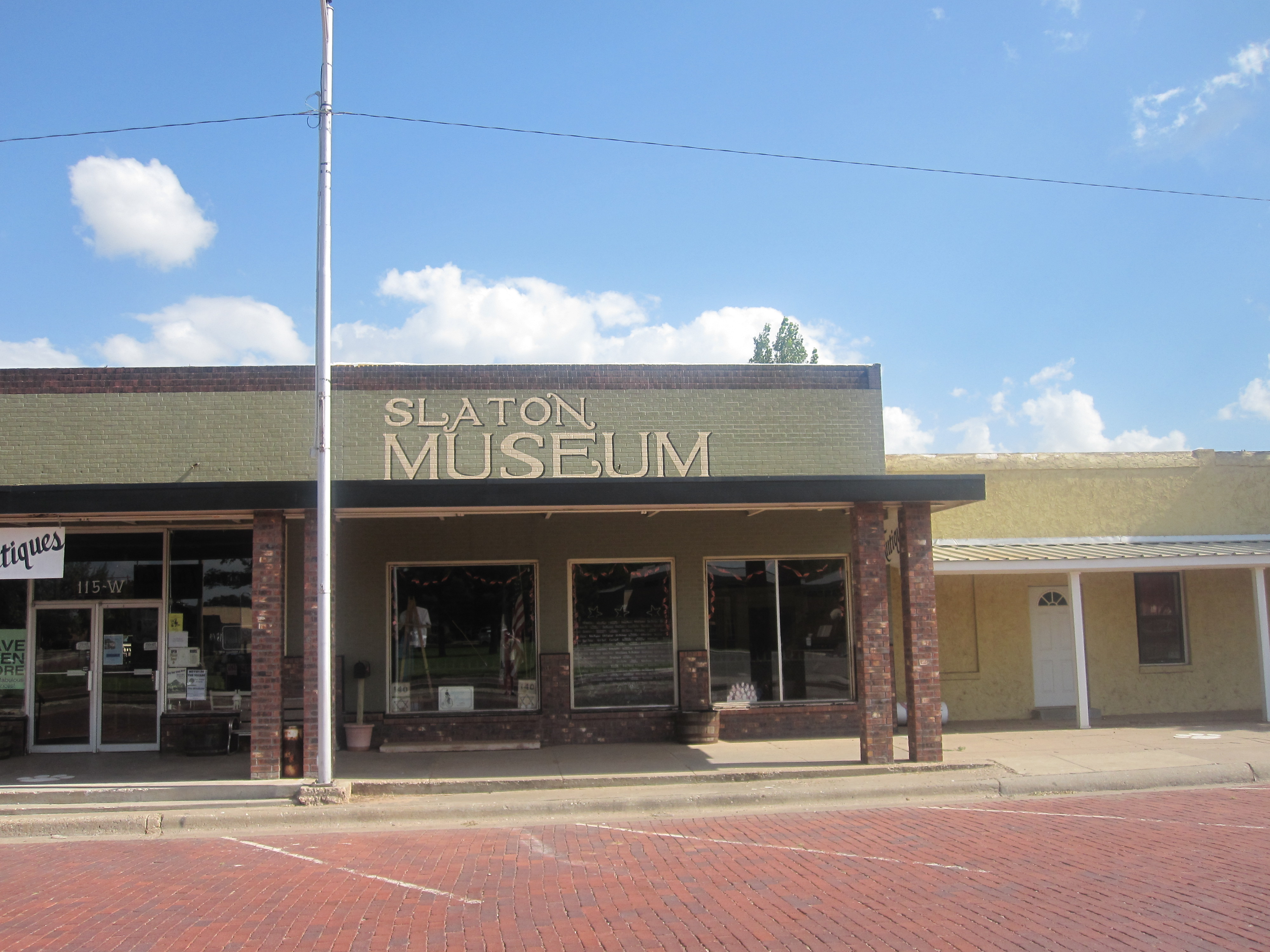
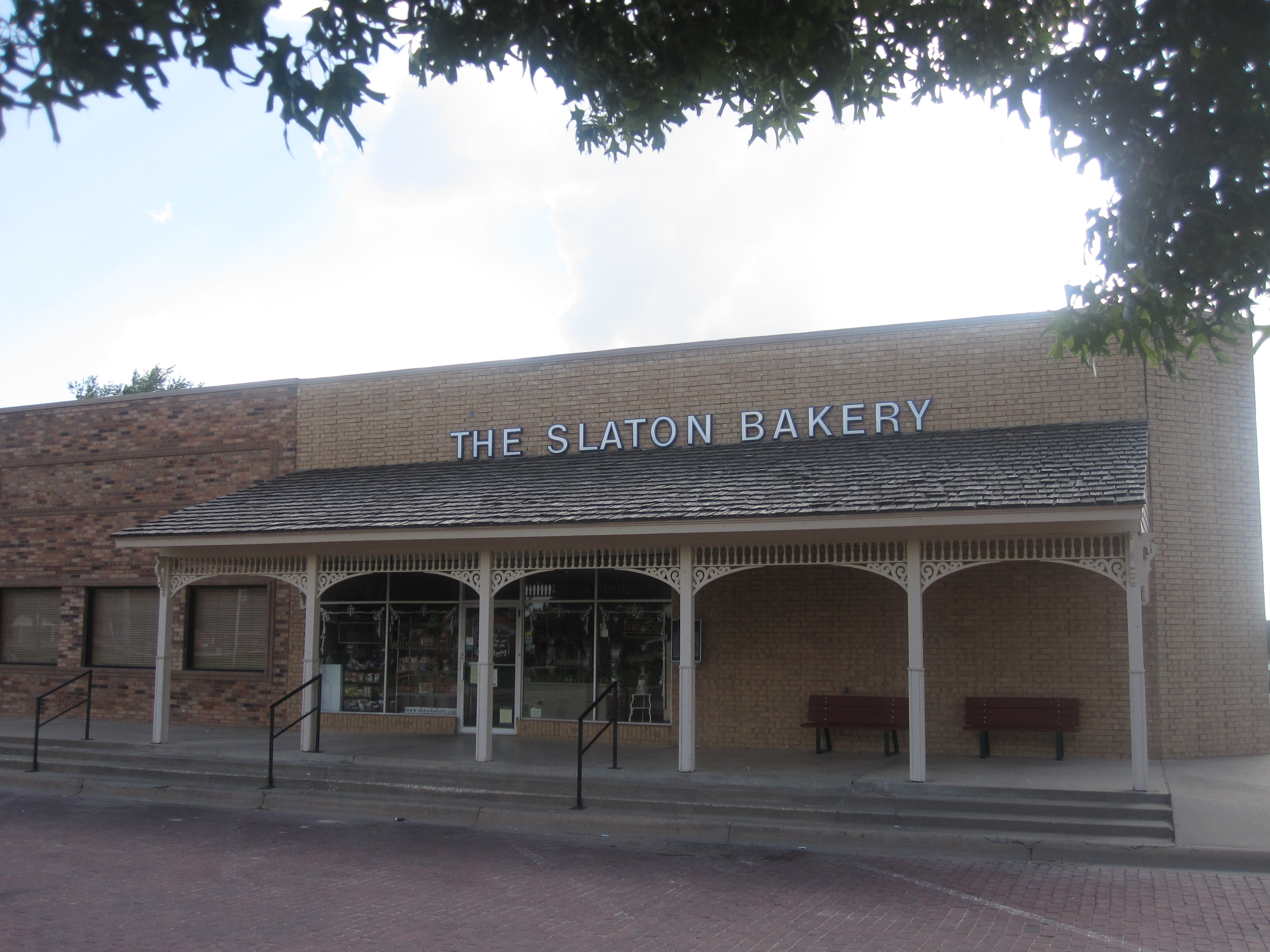
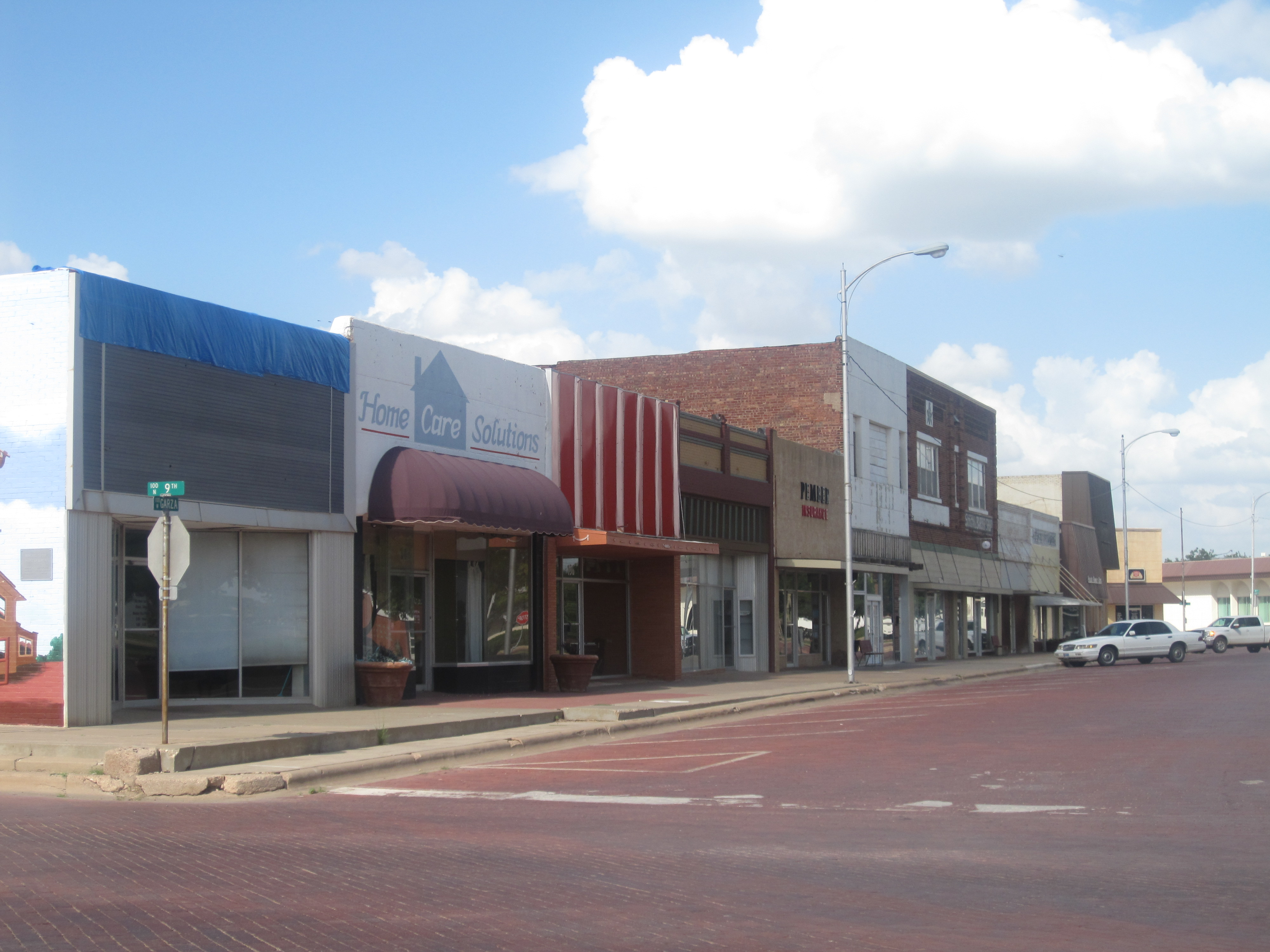
- New Slaton municipal building Harvey House near the tracks in Slaton Slaton Museum The Slaton Bakery is one of the better-known businesses in the community. Downtown Slaton
- Motto: "Your Kind of Town"
- Interactive location map of Slaton
- Coordinates: 33.445472°N 101.650919°W
- Country: United States
- State: Texas
- County: Lubbock
- Region: Llano Estacado
- Established: 1911
- Incorporated: June 15, 1911
- Named for: O. L. Slaton

Government
  - Type: Council–Manager
  - Mayor: Clifton Shaw
  - Commission members: Carla Rodriguez; Jim Taliaferro; Benny Lopez; Valarie Johnson
  - City manager: Wade Willson
  - City secretary: Pamela King
  - City attorney: Bryan J. Guymon

Area
  - Total: 5.458 sq mi (14.136 km^{2})
  - Land: 5.427 sq mi (14.055 km^{2})
  - Water: 0.031 sq mi (0.080 km^{2}) 0.57%
- Elevation: 3,081 ft (939 m)

Population (2020)
  - Total: 5,858
  - Estimate (2024): 5,698
  - Density: 1,079/sq mi (416.8/km^{2})
- Demonym: Slatonites
- Time zone: UTC–6 (Central (CST))
  - Summer (DST): UTC–5 (CDT)
- ZIP Code: 79364
- Area codes: 806
- FIPS code: 48-68180
- GNIS feature ID: 2411908
- Website: www.slaton.texas.gov

Slaton is a city in Lubbock County, Texas, United States. Founded by German immigrants, Slaton was the westernmost German settlement in Texas. The population was 5,858 at the 2020 census, and was estimated at 5,698 in 2024. Slaton is part of the Lubbock Metropolitan Statistical Area.

== History ==
Slaton was established on June 15, 1911. Slaton was named for Lubbock rancher and banker O.L. Slaton, Sr. (1867–1946), who promoted railroad construction in Slaton.

== Geography ==
Slaton is on the level plains of the Llano Estacado. The nearest significant geographical feature is Yellow House Canyon, which is 3 miles (5 km) to the northeast. According to the United States Census Bureau, the city has a total area of 5.458 square miles (14.14 km^{2}), of which 5.427 square miles (14.06 km^{2}) is land and 0.031 square miles (0.080 km^{2}) (0.57%) is water.

=== Climate ===
According to the Köppen climate classification system, Slaton has a semiarid climate, BSk on climate maps.

== Demographics ==
Historical population
Census	Pop.	Note	%±
1920	1,525		—
1930	3,876		154.2%
1940	3,587		−7.5%
1950	5,036		40.4%
1960	6,568		30.4%
1970	6,583		0.2%
1980	6,804		3.4%
1990	6,078		−10.7%
2000	6,109		0.5%
2010	6,121		0.2%
2020	5,858		−4.3%
2024 (est.)	5,698		−2.7%
U.S. Decennial Census; 2020 Census

According to realtor website Zillow, the average price of a home as of December 31, 2025, in Slaton is $133,798.

As of the 2023 American Community Survey, there are 2,038 estimated households in Slaton with an average of 2.81 persons per household. The city has a median household income of $54,380. Approximately 16.1% of the city's population lives at or below the poverty line. Slaton has an estimated 54.7% employment rate, with 11.5% of the population holding a bachelor's degree or higher and 82.6% holding a high school diploma. There were 2,271 housing units at an average density of 418.46 per square mile (161.6/km^{2}).

The top five reported languages (people were allowed to report up to two languages, thus the figures will generally add to more than 100%) were English (73.7%), Spanish (25.2%), Indo-European (0.0%), Asian and Pacific Islander (0.0%), and Other (1.1%).

The median age in the city was 33.0 years.

=== Racial and ethnic composition ===
Slaton, Texas – racial and ethnic composition Note: the US Census treats Hispanic/Latino as an ethnic category. This table excludes Latinos from the racial categories and assigns them to a separate category. Hispanics/Latinos may be of any race.
Race / ethnicity (NH = non-Hispanic)	Pop. 1980	Pop. 1990	Pop. 2000	Pop. 2010	Pop. 2020
White alone (NH)	3,850 (56.58%)	3,267 (53.75%)	2,994 (49.01%)	2,570 (41.99%)	2,196 (37.49%)
Black or African American alone (NH)	602 (8.85%)	566 (9.31%)	467 (7.64%)	351 (5.73%)	301 (5.14%)
Native American or Alaska Native alone (NH)	0 (0.00%)	7 (0.12%)	18 (0.29%)	14 (0.23%)	4 (0.07%)
Asian alone (NH)	52 (0.76%)	4 (0.07%)	8 (0.13%)	11 (0.18%)	10 (0.17%)
Pacific Islander alone (NH)	—	—	0 (0.00%)	1 (0.02%)	4 (0.07%)
Other race alone (NH)	0 (0.00%)	6 (0.10%)	0 (0.00%)	7 (0.11%)	21 (0.36%)
Mixed race or multiracial (NH)	—	—	40 (0.65%)	65 (1.06%)	148 (2.53%)
Hispanic or Latino (any race)	2,300 (33.80%)	2,228 (36.66%)	2,582 (42.27%)	3,102 (50.68%)	3,174 (54.18%)
Total	6,804 (100.00%)	6,078 (100.00%)	6,109 (100.00%)	6,121 (100.00%)	5,858 (100.00%)

=== 2024 estimate ===
As of the 2024 estimate, there were 5,698 people, 2,038 households, and _ families residing in the city. The population density was 1,049.94 inhabitants per square mile (405.4/km^{2}). There were 2,271 housing units at an average density of 418.46 per square mile (161.6/km^{2}). The racial makeup of the city was 66.5% White (45.6% NH White), 8.7% African American, 0.0% Native American, 0.0% Asian, 0.0% Pacific Islander, _% from some other races and 4.5% from two or more races. Hispanic or Latino people of any race were 46.8% of the population.

=== 2020 census ===
As of the 2020 census, Slaton had a population of 5,858 and a median age of 38.1 years. 26.7% of residents were under the age of 18 and 18.0% of residents were 65 years of age or older. For every 100 females there were 92.1 males, and for every 100 females age 18 and over there were 89.0 males age 18 and over. The population density was 1,084.81 inhabitants per square mile (418.8/km^{2}) with 2,556 housing units at an average density of 473.33 per square mile (182.8/km^{2}).

96.9% of residents lived in urban areas, while 3.1% lived in rural areas.

There were 2,208 households in Slaton, of which 34.3% had children under the age of 18 living in them. Of all households, 42.8% were married-couple households, 19.2% were households with a male householder and no spouse or partner present, and 31.8% were households with a female householder and no spouse or partner present. About 28.3% of all households were made up of individuals and 14.0% had someone living alone who was 65 years of age or older.

There were 2,556 housing units, of which 13.6% were vacant. The homeowner vacancy rate was 0.9% and the rental vacancy rate was 14.4%.

Racial composition as of the 2020 census
Race	Number	Percent
White	3,330	56.8%
Black or African American	339	5.8%
American Indian and Alaska Native	36	0.6%
Asian	10	0.2%
Native Hawaiian and Other Pacific Islander	4	0.1%
Some other race	882	15.1%
Two or more races	1,257	21.5%
Hispanic or Latino (of any race)	3,174	54.2%

=== 2010 census ===
As of the 2010 census, there were 6,121 people, 2,216 households, and _ families residing in the city. The population density was 1,114.73 inhabitants per square mile (430.4/km^{2}). There were 2,545 housing units at an average density of 463.49 per square mile (179.0/km^{2}). The racial makeup of the city was 74.42% White, 6.36% African American, 0.51% Native American, 0.21% Asian, 0.02% Pacific Islander, 16.16% from some other races and 2.34% from two or more races. Hispanic or Latino people of any race were 50.68% of the population.

=== 2000 census ===
As of the 2000 census, there were 6,109 people, 2,253 households, and 1,610 families residing in the city. The population density was 1,127.0 inhabitants per square mile (435.1/km^{2}). There were 2,565 housing units at an average density of 473.1 per square mile (182.7/km^{2}). The racial makeup of the city was 72.35% White, 7.76% African American, 0.59% Native American, 0.16% Asian, 0.08% Pacific Islander, 17.07% from some other races and 1.98% from two or more races. Hispanic or Latino people of any race were 42.27% of the population.

There were 2,253 households, 33.5% had children under the age of 18 living with them, 52.0% were married couples living together, 15.5% had a female householder with no husband present, and 28.5% were not families. About 25.9% of all households were made up of individuals, and 13.8% had someone living alone who was 65 years of age or older. The average household size was 2.67 and the average family size was 3.22.

In the city, the population was distributed as 29.0% under the age of 18, 10.3% from 18 to 24, 23.5% from 25 to 44, 20.9% from 45 to 64, and 16.3% who were 65 years of age or older. The median age was 35 years. For every 100 females, there were 87.7 males. For every 100 women age 18 and over, there were 83.7 men.

The median income for a household in the city was $25,915, and for a family was $31,224. Males had a median income of $26,696 versus $20,601 for females. The per capita income for the city was $13,087. About 21.6% of families and 23.0% of the population were below the poverty line, including 33.7% of those under age 18 and 16.4% of those age 65 or over.

== Education ==
The City of Slaton is served by the Slaton Independent School District.

== Infrastructure ==
=== Major roads and highways ===
- U.S. Highway 84
- Farm to Market Road 400
- Farm to Market Road 41

=== Railroads ===
A major yard of the BNSF Railway is located in Slaton. The South Plains Lamesa Railroad's railpark offers car storage and transloading for, among other commodities, wind turbine components.

== Special events ==
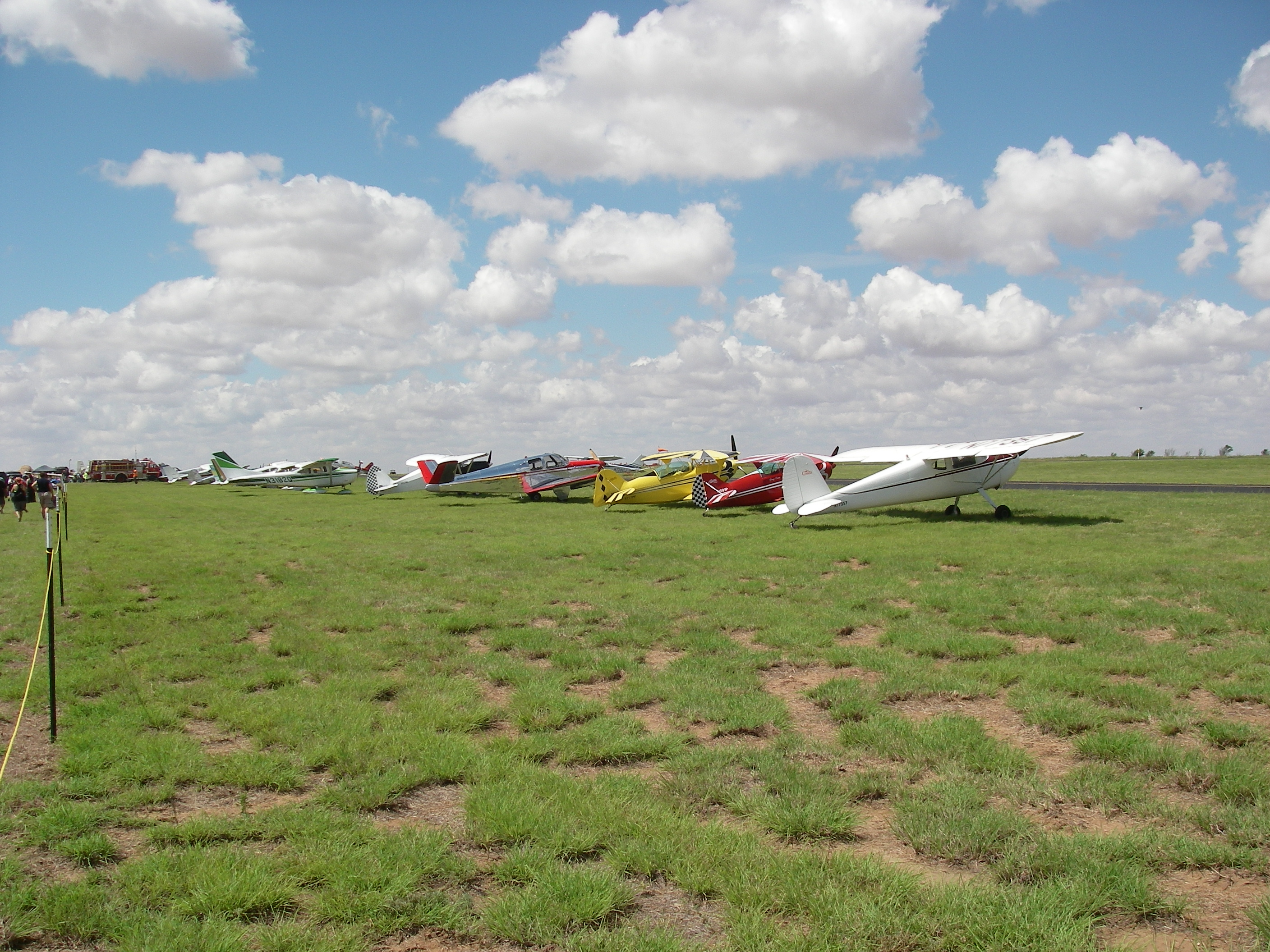
South Plains Airshow held at the Slaton airport

The July 4th Festival takes place at the Slaton Park, where area musicians perform on an outdoor stage. The park is filled with games, rides, food, and more. The South Plains Air Show is a biannual event taking place the first weekend of June in odd-number years. Hosted by the Texas Air Museum Caprock Chapter, the show takes place at the City of Slaton/Larry T. Neal Memorial Airport. Re-enactments and aerobatic performances are scheduled www.thetexasairmuseum.org.

The St. Joseph Sausage Fest was established in 1969, and operated by the family and friends of St Joseph Catholic School until it closed in 2017. Since that time, Parishioners of St Joseph Catholic Church in Slaton host the event the third weekend of each October.

== Notable people ==
People born in Slaton:

- Roy Alvin Baldwin (1885–1940), politician
- Jeremy Boreing (born 1979), media and movie producer
- Harry Burrus (1921–2004), footballer
- Dee Fondy (1924–1999), baseball player
- Bobby Keys (1943–2014), saxophonist
- Bill Lienhard (1930–2022), basketballer
- Buddy Parker (1913–1982), footballer
- Simon Salinas (born 1955), politician

== See also ==
- Canyon Valley, Texas
- Close City, Texas
- Llano Estacado
- North Fork Double Mountain Fork Brazos River
- Ransom Canyon, Texas
- Southland, Texas
- Yellow House Canyon
- West Texas
