= Frenship Independent School District =

School district in Texas, United States

Location
- 501 7th Street, Wolfforth, TX, 79382 Wolfforth, Lubbock County, Texas; United States

District information
- Type: Independent school district
- Motto: "Seek perfection - Capture excellence"
- Grades: PK-12
- Established: 1935 (91 years ago)
- Superintendent: Dr. Michelle McCord
- Asst. superintendent(s): Dr. Lisa Libre
- Governing agency: Texas Education Agency
- Schools: 16

Students and staff
- Students: 10,860 students (2022)
- Student–teacher ratio: 15:1
- District mascot: Tigers
- Colors: Blue and gold

Other information
- Website: www.frenship.net

Frenship Independent School District is a public school district based in Wolfforth, Texas, United States.

In addition to Wolfforth, the district serves western portions of Lubbock and southwestern Lubbock County. A small part of Hockley County also lies within the district. As of the 2021-2022 school year, the district had 10,860 students.

In 2009, the school district was rated "academically acceptable" by the Texas Education Agency.

== Schools ==
Frenship ISD has 14 schools; four schools are located in Wolfforth, nine are in the city of Lubbock, and one is in Lubbock County.

=== High schools (grades 9-12) ===
- Frenship High School (Wolfforth)
- Frenship Memorial High School (Lubbock)
- Reese Education Center (Lubbock)

=== Middle schools (grades 6-8) ===
- Frenship Middle School has a new building in the area that used to be the district's Ninth Grade Center (Wolfforth).
- Heritage Middle School (Lubbock)
- Terra Vista Middle School (Lubbock)
- Alcove Trails Middle School (Lubbock)

=== Elementary schools (prekindergarten-grade 5) ===
- Bennett Elementary School (Wolfforth)
- Crestview Elementary School (Lubbock)
- Legacy Elementary School (Lubbock)
- North Ridge Elementary School (Lubbock)
- Oak Ridge Elementary School (Lubbock)
- Upland Heights Elementary School (Lubbock)
- Westwind Elementary School (Lubbock)
- Willow Bend Elementary School (Lubbock)
- Ridgewood Elementary School (Lubbock)

== Notable students ==
- William John Cox (Billy Jack Cox), public interest attorney, author, and political activist; attended 1946-1956
