= Wolfforth, Texas =

- City
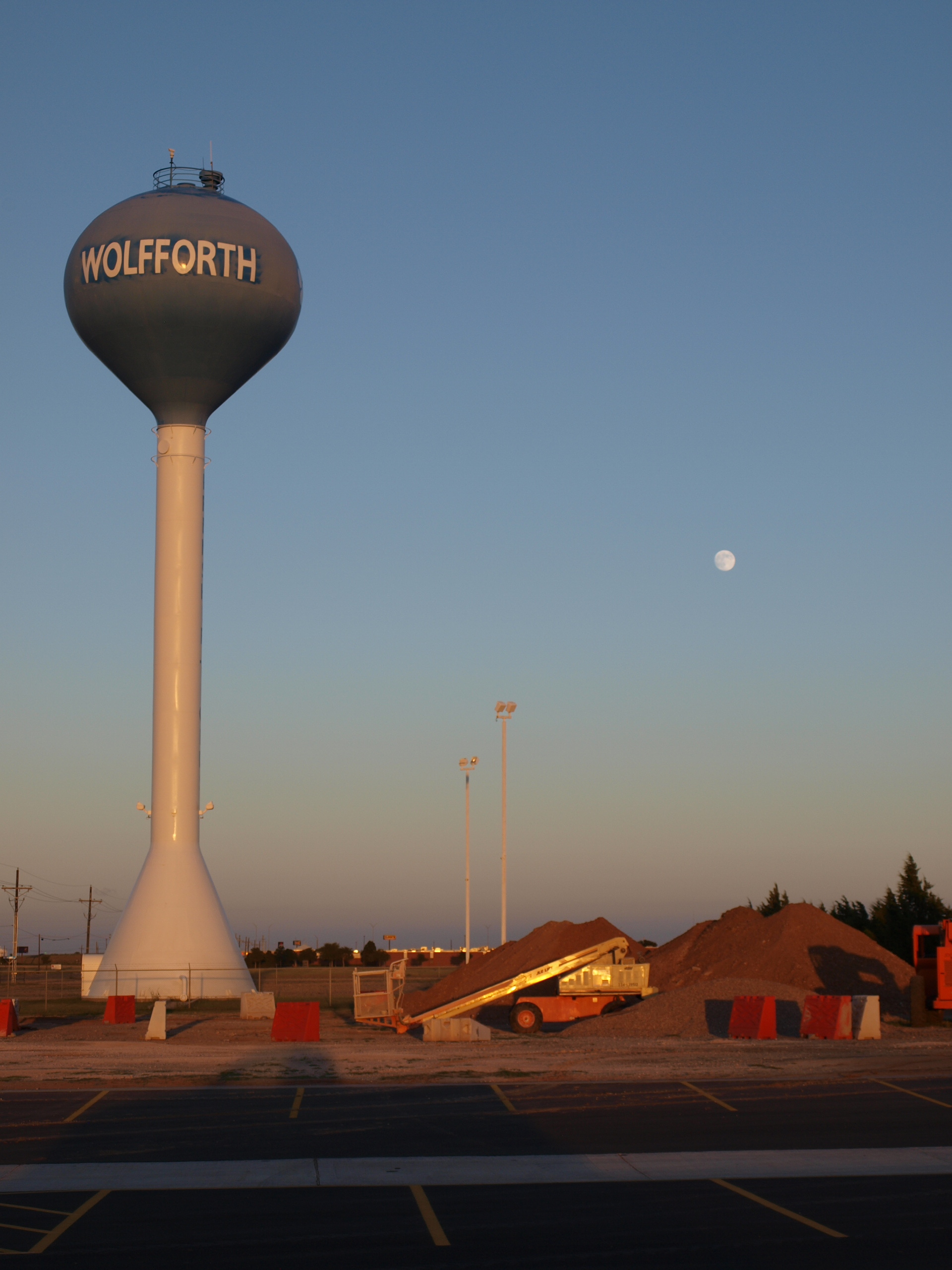
- Motto: "The place to be"
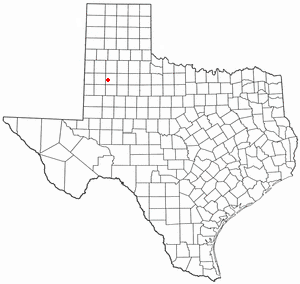
- Location of Wolfforth, Texas

- Coordinates: 33°30′14″N 102°0′43″W
- Country: United States
- State: Texas
- County: Lubbock

Government
  - Mayor: Charles Addington II
  - City Manager: Randy Criswell
  - City Secretary: Terri Robinette

Area
  - Total: 3.07 sq mi (7.96 km^{2})
  - Land: 3.06 sq mi (7.93 km^{2})
  - Water: 0.012 sq mi (0.03 km^{2})
- Elevation: 3,317 ft (1,011 m)

Population (2020)
  - Total: 5,521
  - Density: 1,800/sq mi (696/km^{2})
- Time zone: UTC-6 (Central (CST))
  - Summer (DST): UTC-5 (CDT)
- ZIP code: 79382
- Area code: 806
- FIPS code: 48-79972
- GNIS feature ID: 1371874
- Website: www.wolfforthtx.us

Wolfforth (/ˈwʊlfɔːrθ/ WUUL-forth) is a town located in Lubbock County, Texas, United States. It is a southwestern suburb of Lubbock. Its population was 5,521 at the 2020 census.

== History ==
Wolfforth was established in 1916 and developed as a railroad town when the Panhandle and Santa Fe Railway built through the area.

The Wolffarth brothers, George ("Tildy") and Eastin, had settled in the area. George was a rancher, and Eastin was a Lubbock County sheriff circa 1900. The city is named for George (1866–1950) and his wife, (née Charlotte Lottie Alma Hunt, 1879–1952).

== Geography ==
According to the United States Census Bureau, the city has a total area of 3.1 square miles (8.0 km^{2}), of which 0.012 square miles (0.03 km^{2}), or 0.41%, is covered by water.

== Demographics ==
Historical population
Census	Pop.	Note	%±
1960	597		—
1970	1,090		82.6%
1980	1,701		56.1%
1990	1,941		14.1%
2000	2,554		31.6%
2010	3,670		43.7%
2020	5,521		50.4%
U.S. Decennial Census

=== 2020 census ===
As of the 2020 census, 5,521 people, 1,922 households, and 1,313 families were residing in the city. The median age was 34.3 years; 29.3% of residents were under 18 and 11.3% were 65 or older. For every 100 females, there were 92.2 males, and for every 100 females 18 and over, there were 89.1 males 18 and over.

Almost all of the residents lived in urban areas, while 0.1% lived in rural areas.

Of the 1,922 households in Wolfforth, 45.6% had children under 18 living in them, 60.5% were married-couple households, 12.3% were households with a male householder and no spouse or partner present, and 22.3% were households with a female householder and no spouse or partner present. About 17.8% of all households were made up of individuals, and 7.5% had someone living alone who was 65 or older.

The town had 2,073 housing units, of which 7.3% were vacant. The homeowner vacancy rate was 2.8% and the rental vacancy rate was 12.5%.

Racial composition as of the 2020 census
Race	Number	Percentage
White	4,139	75.0%
Black or African American	141	2.6%
American Indian and Alaska Native	44	0.8%
Asian	55	1.0%
Native Hawaiian and other Pacific Islander	1	0.0%
Some other race	378	6.8%
Two or more races	763	13.8%
Hispanic or Latino (of any race)	1,531	27.7%

=== 2000 census ===
As of the 2000 census, 2,554 people, 900 households, and 723 families were living in the city. The population density was 1,701 inhabitants per square mile (657/km^{2}). The 972 housing units had an average density of 647.2 per square mile (249.9/km^{2}). The racial makeup of the city was 85.47% White, 1.29% African American, 0.16% Native American, 0.23% Asian, 12.06% from other races, and 0.78% from two or more races. Hispanics or Latinos of any race were 22.71% of the population.

Of the 900 households, 43.6% had children under 18 living with them, 61.3% were married couples living together, 15.4% had a female householder with no husband present, and 19.6% were not families. About 16.7% of all households were made up of individuals, and 7.1% had someone living alone who was 65or older. The average household size was 2.79, and the average family size was 3.12.

In the city, the age distribution was 29.9% under 18, 8.3% from 18 to 24, 32.2% from 25 to 44, 20.1% from 45 to 64, and 9.5% who were 65 or older. The median age was 33 years. For every 100 females, there were 89.9 males. For every 100 females 18 and over, there were 87.1 males.

The median income in the city for a household was $37,465 and for a family was $40,694. Males had a median income of $30,461 versus $20,990 for females. The per capita income for the city was $16,567. About 12.4% of families and 15.1% of the population were below the poverty line, including 16.7% of those under 18 and 22.0% of those 65 or over.

== Education ==
Wolfforth is served by the Frenship Independent School District, which has 14 schools. Four are located in Wolfforth, nine in the City of Lubbock, and one in Lubbock County outside an incorporated area.

== Transportation ==
US 62/US 82, also known as the Marsha Sharp Freeway, forms a portion of the town's boundary while bypassing to the south. Farm to Market Road 179, also known as Dowden Road, is the main north-south highway through the town. Loop 193, also known as Main Street, runs through the town, serving as the business route for US 62/82.

The Lubbock and Western Railway (a Watco subsidiary) serves the city.
