= Slaton Independent School District =

School district in Texas

Coordinates: 33°26′13″N 101°38′29″W

Slaton Independent School District is a public school district based in Slaton, Texas, United States. In addition to Slaton, the district serves students in rural southeastern Lubbock County and parts of Ransom Canyon. A small portion of extreme northeastern Lynn County lies within the district.

In 2009, the school district was rated "academically acceptable" by the Texas Education Agency.

== Schools ==
- Slaton High School (grades 9–12), 2008 National Blue Ribbon School
- Slaton Junior High School (grades 6–8)
- Cathelene Thomas Elementary School (grades 1–5)
- Austin Elementary School (pre-K–kindergarten)

== Notable students ==
- William John Cox, public interest attorney, author, and political activist; attended Slaton High School, 1956–57
