= Happy State Bank Stadium =

Football stadium in Canyon, Texas

- Interactive map of Happy State Bank Stadium
- Former names: Buffalo Bowl (1959–1971); Kimbrough Memorial Stadium (1971–2020)
- Address: 2800 N. 23rd St
- Location: Canyon, Texas
- Coordinates: 35°0′43″N 101°55′0″W
- Owner: Canyon Independent School District
- Capacity: 20,000
- Surface: Artificial turf

Construction
- Opened: 1959

Tenants
- West Texas A&M Buffaloes (NCAA) (1959–2018); Canyon ISD (UIL) (1991–present)

Happy State Bank Stadium, formerly known as Kimbrough Memorial Stadium, is a stadium in Canyon, Texas. It is owned by Canyon Independent School District and is primarily used for American football. It is the home stadium for Canyon High School, Randall High School, and West Plains High School of Canyon Independent School District, and is the former home of West Texas A&M University. The stadium holds 20,000 people and was built in 1959.

== History ==
=== Buffalo Bowl and Kimbrough Memorial Stadium ===
It was originally called Buffalo Bowl on Canyon Hill but was renamed Kimbrough Memorial Stadium in 1971 in honor of the late West Texas State University football coach and athletic director Frank Kimbrough.

In the first football game played at the stadium in 1959, West Texas A&M, then known as West Texas State, was defeated by the University of Arizona by a score of 7–6. The most attended event in the history of the stadium was a homecoming game on October 13, 2007, between West Texas A&M and Eastern New Mexico University, with 23,276 spectators present as West Texas A&M won the game by a score of 62–31.

In September 2017, Canyon ISD purchased the stadium from West Texas A&M. The stadium had previously been leased to Canyon ISD since 1991.

=== Happy State Bank Stadium ===
In 2020, Happy State Bank bought the naming rights to the stadium and it was renamed Happy State Bank Stadium, but Frank Kimbrough will still have a place at the old West Texas A&M home stadium: "Canyon ISD plans to honor the late former West Texas A&M athletic director and head football coach Frank Kimbrough, whose name stood on the stadium since 1971 with a memorial grove area at the front entrance of the new facility on the south end of the stadium." As part of the deal, Happy State Bank donated $2 million to renovate the stadium, which included new locker rooms, a banquet hall and conference center, and a balcony overlooking Kimbrough Grove.
