= Margaret Pease Harper =

American educator, musician, and civic leader

Margaret Pease Harper (July 22, 1911 - November 16, 1991) was an American educator, musician and civic leader. She is best known for originating the idea for the historical outdoor drama, Texas, and facilitating both its creation and the Pioneer Amphitheater where it is performed in Palo Duro Canyon.

== Biography ==
Harper was born in St. Paul, Minnesota on July 22, 1911. Her father, Rollin Pease, was a singer who was involved in historical pageants. Harper was raised in Evanston, Illinois. From 1931 to 1951, her father worked as a professor of music at the University of Arizona (UA). Harper earned her bachelor's degree from UA and then studied at the American Conservatory in Chicago while also earning her master's degree from the University of Chicago. While Harper was in college and for some time after, she traveled with her father and worked as his accompanist. After graduation, she taught in the Tucson public schools.

She was married to Ples Harper on June 1, 1939, and the couple moved to Peru where Ples worked as a cultural-exchange director for the United States. They stayed in Peru for about five years and during this time, Harper worked as a director for girls in Callao. When Ples took a job at West Texas State Teachers College (now West Texas A&M University) in 1946, the couple settled in Canyon, Texas. There she worked as a piano teacher at Canyon High School. Harper also wrote a book, Meet Some Musical Terms: A First Dictionary in 1959.

In July 1960, Harper was inspired to create an outdoor musical using the Palo Duro Canyon as the place for the performance. She founded an organization in 1961, the Texas Panhandle Heritage Foundation Incorporated, which eventually built the Pioneer Amphitheater located in Palo Duro Canyon. Harper contacted playwright, Paul Green, to see if he would be interested in writing a symphonic drama about the Texas Panhandle. Green wrote a historical drama, Texas, which opened on July 1, 1966. The drama went on to be a success, drawing large numbers of people to the canyon and becoming the best-attended outdoor history drama in the United States according to the Texas Observer.

Harper was honored with the creation of a bronze bust in her likeness, sculpted by Jack King Hill, that was installed in the Pioneer Amphitheater in 1980. She was inducted into the Cowgirl Hall of Fame in 1981. In 1988, she was inducted into the Texas Women's Hall of Fame.

Harper died in a hospital in Amarillo on November 16, 1991. She is buried in Dreamland Cemetery in Canyon.
