= Canyon High School =

Canyon High School may refer to:

- Canyon High School (Anaheim, California)
- Canyon High School (Santa Clarita, California), Canyon Country, Santa Clarita, California
- Canyon High School (Canyon, Texas) in the Canyon Independent School District
- Canyon High School (New Braunfels, Texas) in Comal Independent School District
- Canyon High School (Ogden, Utah)
