= Texas (musical) =

Musical produced annually by the Texas Panhandle Heritage Foundation

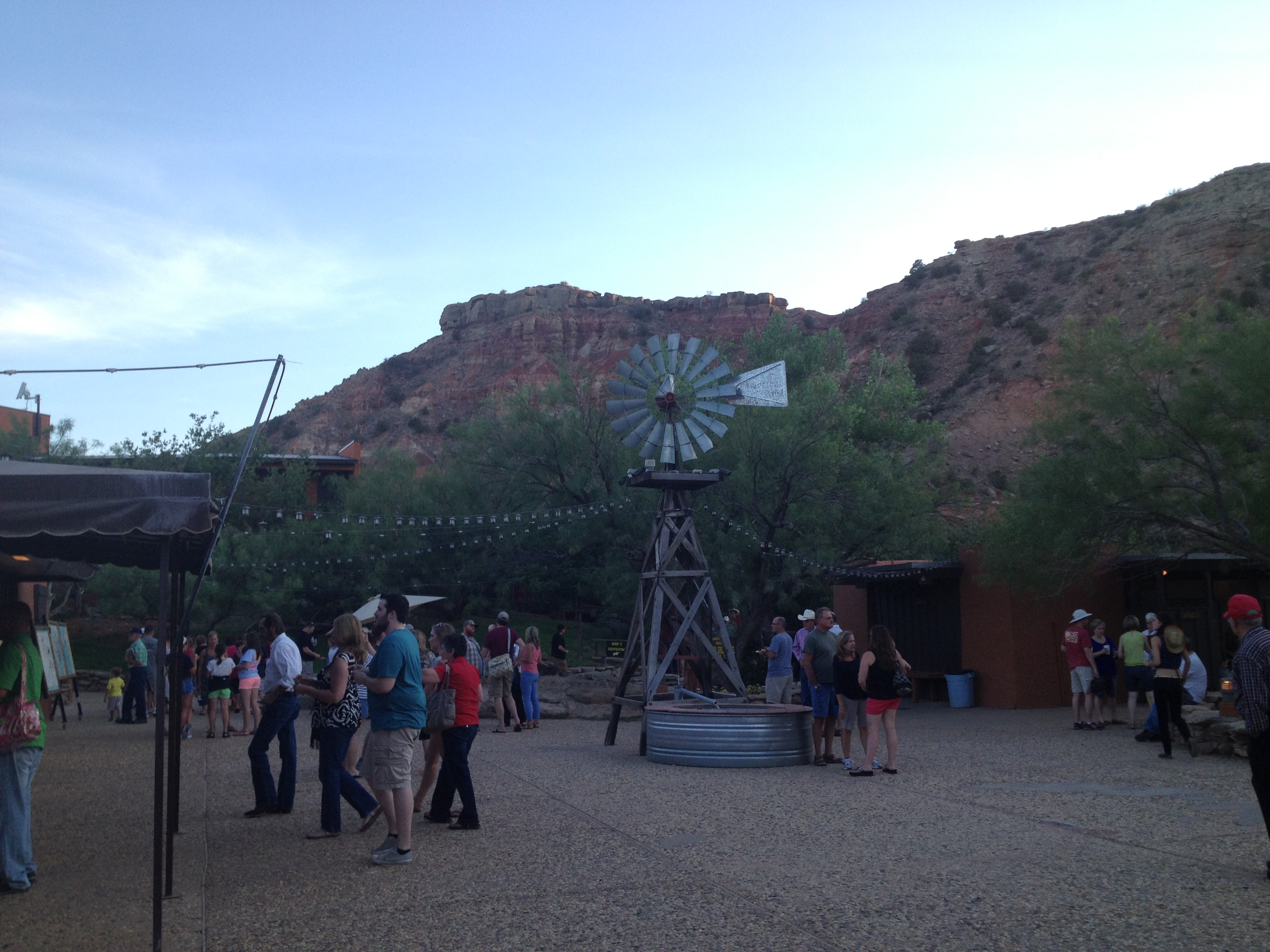
The outdoor lobby of Pioneer Amphitheater in Palo Duro Canyon

Texas is a stage musical produced annually by the Texas Panhandle Heritage Foundation at the outdoor Pioneer Amphitheater in Palo Duro Canyon outside of Canyon, Texas. The show is performed every Tuesday through Sunday from June through August. It was written by Pulitzer Prize-winning playwright Paul Green and conceived of as an idea by Margaret Pease Harper.

The show is family-friendly and described as a "musical romance of Texas panhandle history". The plot is set against an authentic tapestry of history and the show's fictional characters bring to life the stories, struggles, and triumphs of the settlers of the Texas Panhandle in the 1800s.

== Plot ==
The musical drama is about ranchers and farmers in the early days of Texas' settlement in the 1880s. The major themes of the play are love, romance, and people's struggle against the environment. The story's protagonist is Calvin Armstrong, a young homesteader from the East who seeks to make a living as a farmer in the Texas Panhandle. Armstrong has a dramatic romantic affair with Elsie McClain, who is the niece of Colonel Henry. Henry, a character most likely based on rancher, Charles Goodnight, is buying land and fencing it off for his cattle. McClain contributes to the conflict between Henry and Armstrong. The play covers events such as droughts and fear of losing one's land. It ends happily, and "the appropriate couples get married".

Later versions of the show have been changed by directors, with each change vetted by Green or later, his literary executor. Some of the show's highlights include special fire and water effects.

== History ==
The idea for Texas was born in July of at a dinner where Margaret Pease Harper and her husband Ples discussed issues relating to the Palo Duro Canyon with William and Margaret Moore. Both couples wanted to find a way to attract tourists to the canyon and also provide jobs during the summer. All four also wanted to find a way to teach the history of the region in a way that would be exciting. Harper had read an article in Reader's Digest about playwright and author Paul Eliot Green. Green had recreated the histories of several regions of America in what he called "symphonic dramas", featuring pageantry and music.

Harper began corresponding with Green about the land, people, and beauty of Palo Duro Canyon. Green replied within a week, stating he was interested in the project and wanted to meet. In 1961, Harper and a group of Canyon, Texas families brought Green to their city and he was intrigued by the place and began writing the musical.

The music, dancing, choreography, and direction of the production came from various departments of nearby West Texas State College (now West Texas A&M University). Texas first opened at its permanent home in the Pioneer Auditorium on July 1, 1966.

In 2003, a new script, titled Texas Legacies, premiered in 2003 and ran through the show's 40th anniversary in 2005. The new show, written by Lynn Hart, was meant to be more historically accurate and focused on different eras of Texas history each year. Texas Legacies did not prove to be a successful change, and in 2006, the original Texas returned to the Pioneer Amphitheater by popular demand.

== Texas Panhandle Heritage Foundation ==
The show is produced by Texas Panhandle Heritage Foundation, a not-for-profit organization. It was founded by Margaret Pease Harper on May 7, 1961. Along with Harper, the first board of directors included Pete Cowart, Jerry LaGrone, Dorothy Nebelett, Raymond Raillard, William A. Moore, and Avent Lair. In July, they discussed their initial purpose, which was to "recapture, recreate, and preserve the history of the Texas Panhandle by the presentation of a symphonic drama in a permanent theater in the Palo Duro Canyon of Texas." In September 1961, the organization incorporated legally and the group came to represent 40 West Texas counties. The first project of the group was to build an amphitheater in Palo Duro Canyon, which would have as a backdrop a 600-foot cliff. The theater, named Pioneer Amphitheater, was eventually built with 1,600 seats.

== 2013 tragedy ==
Five members of the Texas cast died in an automobile accident north of Amarillo shortly before midnight on August 12, 2013, while returning from a cast party held south of Dumas. The August 13 performance was cancelled in light of the deaths. Killed were Clinton Diaz, the 20-year-old driver, who was from Amarillo; Andrew Duncan, of Wichita Falls; Amanda Starz, of Timonium, Maryland; Julian Arredondo, of Haltom City, Texas, and Eric Harrison, of Fort Worth. Surviving but injured were their fellow passenger, Timothy Johnson of Portland, Oregon; and another driver, Theron Arthur McSay of Fort Collins, Colorado. Diaz's vehicle struck McSay's tractor-trailer rig as Diaz was turning from FM 119 onto U.S. Highway 287. The Texas Department of Public Safety said that alcohol was a factor in the crash.

== See also ==
- Viva! El Paso
