= Palo Duro Canyon paintings of O'Keeffe =

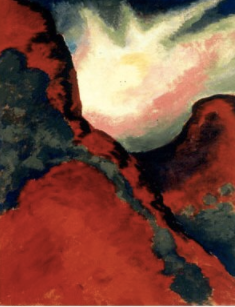
Red Landscape, oil on board, 1916–1917, Panhandle–Plains Historical Museum, West Texas A&M University

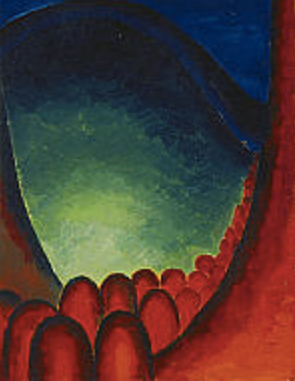
No. 20 Special, oil on board, 17 3/8 in × 13 1/2 in (44 cm × 34 cm), 1916–1917, Milwaukee Art Museum

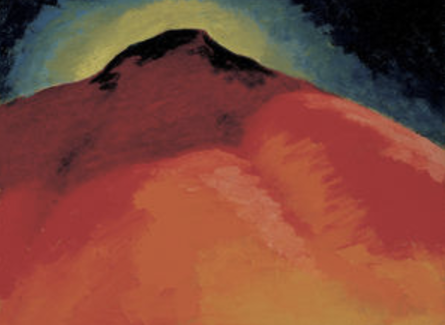
No. 22 - Special, oil on board, 1916–1917, Georgia O'Keeffe Museum

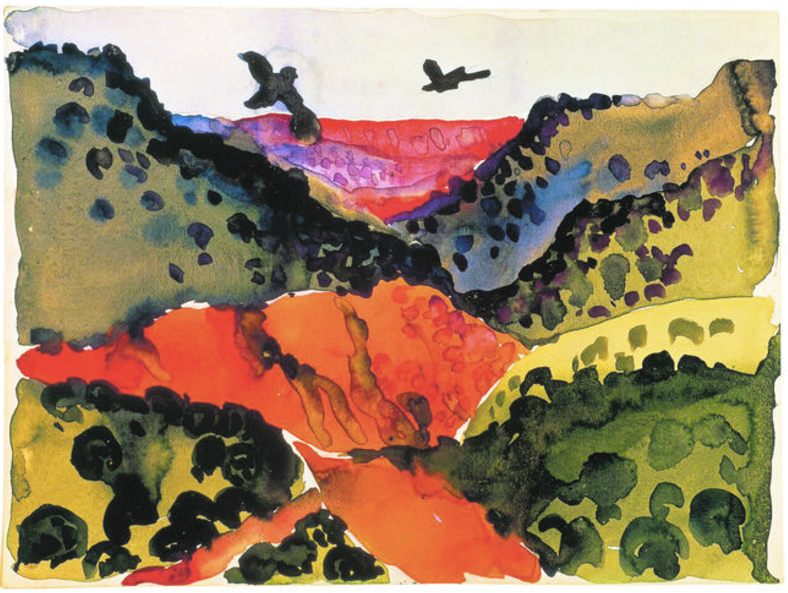
Canyon with Crows, watercolor and graphite on paper, 8 3/4 in × 12 in (22 cm × 30 cm), 1917, Georgia O'Keeffe Museum

Georgia O'Keeffe made a set of paintings of Palo Duro Canyon while working as a department head and art instructor at West Texas State Normal College. The vibrant paintings reflect her development as an Abstract Expressionist, influenced by Arthur Wesley Dow.

== Background ==
While working at West Texas State Normal College between 1916 and 1918, O'Keeffe lived in Canyon, Texas and often visited Palo Duro Canyon, which became a source of inspiration for her paintings that helped her develop as an abstract artist. She made 51 watercolors while living in Canyon. Carolyn Kastner, curator of "Georgia O'Keeffe’s Far Wide Texas", states that "she was at the peak of her commitment to abstraction" at that time.

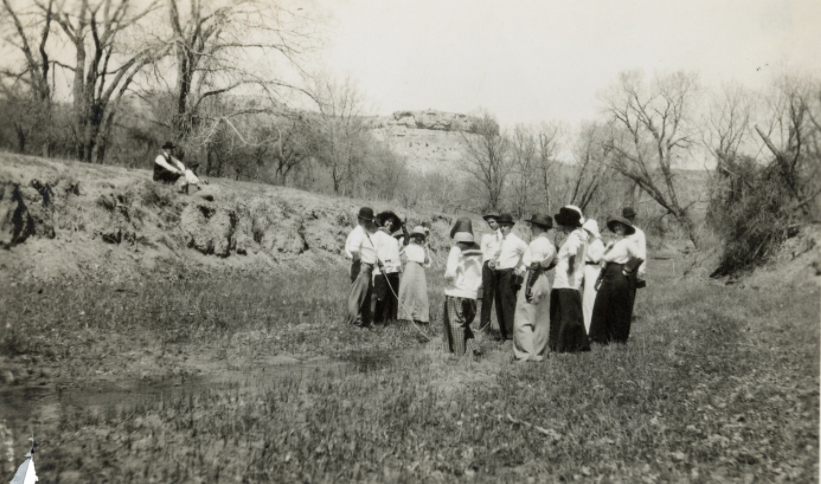
Georgia O'Keeffe and friends at the Palo Duro Club, at the head of Palo Duro Canyon, perhaps between 1912 and 1913, when she first went to Texas, or between 1916 and 1918.

Now a state park, it is the second largest canyon in the United States and is called the "Grand Canyon of Texas". The canyon is 800 feet (240 m) deep, up to 20 miles (32 km) wide, and 120 miles (190 km) long. Within the canyon are rock formations, giant boulders, and hoodoos. There are also multicolored layers of white gypsum, bright red claystone, and lavender, gray, yellow ochre mudstone. She had said that this time in Texas was highly creative, one where she felt the freedom to explore her feelings and different forms.

O'Keeffe traveled to Palo Duro Canyon, 12 miles (19 km) from Canyon, with friends, on farmer's hay wagons, or by walking the distance.

== Overview ==
Inspired by the principles of Arthur Wesley Dow and the Texas landscape, O'Keeffe made paintings using vibrant red, blue and yellow colors. About 1916, she used brilliant red and yellow colors in Special #21: Palo Duro Canyon, which belongs to the New Mexico Museum of Art. It was stolen in December 2003 and has not been recovered. Red Landscape is an abstract expressionist oil painting made in 1916–1917 of the bright red canyon walls, which are the Permian Red Beds from the Jurassic era. A yellow sun shines below a dark sky. Canyon with Crows, a watercolor made in 1917, "depicts a deep purple arroyo that lightens higher to yellows and orange while impressionistic black crows hover in a pale blue sky."

McNay Art Museum in San Antonio held the "O'Keeffe and Texas" exhibit, curated by art historian Sharyn Udall in 1998 show. In 2016, the Georgia O’Keeffe Museum exhibited some of the works from Palo Duro Canyon in the "Georgia O'Keeffe’s Far Wide Texas" exhibit, the theme of which was "Becoming a Modern Artist". It was curated by Carolyn Kastner. The Georgia O’Keeffe: Watercolors 1916-1918 catalog, with more than 40 full-scale reproductions, accompanied the exhibit.
