= Viva! El Paso =

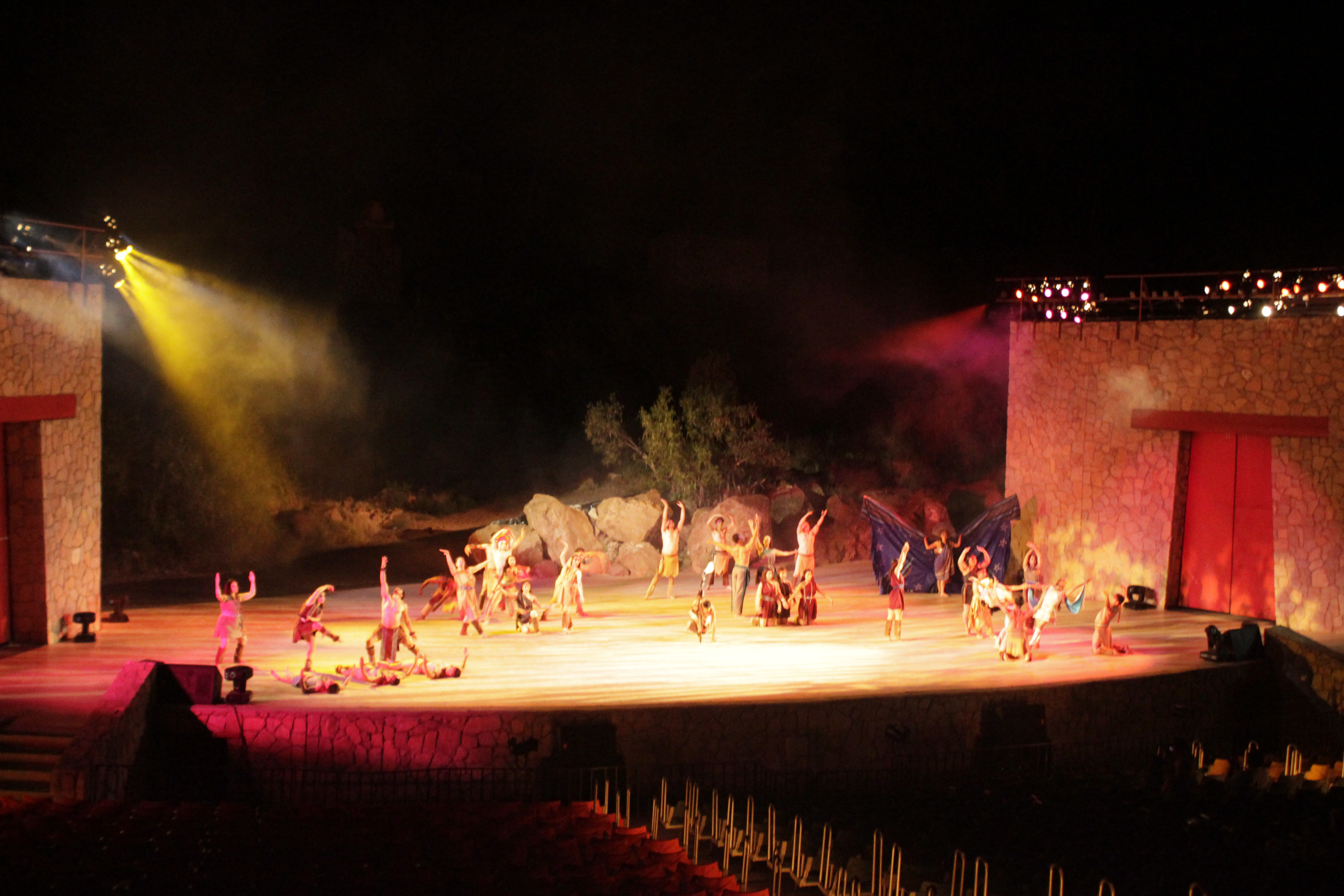
Viva! El Paso rehearsal, 2015.

Viva! El Paso is an annually performed musical which celebrates El Paso's cultural history through dance, drama, narration and songs. It has been running almost continually since 1978 and was updated with a new script and music in 2016. The musical play is performed outdoors in the McKelligon Canyon amphitheater.

June of 2025 marked the 47th year of performances.

== About ==
The performance describes over 400 years of El Paso history. There have been two versions of the musical play. The original play was created by Hector Serrano and was first performed in 1978. It was first produced by the Los Pobres Bilingual Theatre Repertory Company. In 2014, Viva! went on hiatus when there was not enough funding to support the play. A new script was written by Marty Martin for the new production starting in 2016. The new version was produced through a partnership with the University of Texas at El Paso (UTEP), El Paso Live, the El Paso Community Foundation and the El Paso Community College (EPCC).

The new script includes additional musical and dance scenes and streamlines the original script. The 2016 version is also more character-driven than the original, with the focus on two lovers who move through history and time starting with indigenous settlers to the more present day. Musical arrangements were done by Jim Ward and Cody Ritchey.

== See also ==
- Texas
