= Carmen Espinoza-Rodriquez =

American singer-songwriter

Carmen Espinoza Rodriquez
- Born: July 16, 1970 (age 55); Muleshoe, Texas, United States
- Genres: country, Jazz, Blues
- Occupation(s): singer, songwriter
- Instrument: vocals
- Years active: 1993–present
- Labels: Past label(s) Hacienda Records 2001–2002

Carmen Espinoza-Rodriquez (born July 16, 1970, in Muleshoe, Texas) is an American singer-songwriter. She was lead vocalist for twelve years for the musical group Algo Simple before going solo. She is best known for her video America which has been used in PBS documentaries. As an actress, she played the lead role in Texas Legacies for the 2003 season.

== Early life ==
She is one of ten children of Camilo Espinoza, Jr., and Maria Guadalupe Orozco Espinoza. Her first performance was at the age of six with her father, who performed with Bob Wills, Marlon Brando, and The Lennon Sisters. Her love for music and stage grew. In high school, she received the Louis Armstrong Jazz Award for vocals. Carmen attended Texas Tech in Lubbock and West Texas A&M University in Canyon and received her degree in the study of Montessori Education in 1997.

== Career ==
Espinoza-Rodriquez was asked to be the lead vocalist for Hacienda Records artist, Algo Simple. After a twelve-year span with Algo Simple, she decided to go solo. It was at this turning point when she was recommended by CMA Award-winning singer-songwriter Susan Gibson (writer "Wide Open Spaces") to appear on a PBS video documentary. Inspired, she recorded an original composition and shot a video entitled America that has since been featured in two PBS documentaries; Celebrate America! and Southwest Expressions. Past members of her band include Robin Brannon from the Christian vocal group Acappella (group).

Espinoza-Rodriquez was invited to record and perform as a special guest with the WTAMU Jazz Ensemble. During this time, she was approached to go on tour with Texas X-press, an outreach touring troupe for the outdoor musical drama Texas Legacies. It was during the tour that she was asked by the executive producer of Texas Legacies to take on the lead role (and was the first minority to be offered a lead role) as Maria Hinojosa' in Texas Legacies. Carmen accepted the role for the 2003 season. Since then, she has shared the stage with country artists including Lee Roy Van Dyke, Steve Wariner, Restless Heart, Holly Dunn, and Michael Martin Murphey.

== Honors and awards ==
- The Amarillo Globe News Golden Nail Award 2003 – Nominee
- Texas Commission of the Arts Texas State Musician Award 2008 – Nominee

== Discography ==
=== Albums ===
- Algo Simple – Algo Simple – 1997
- Cumbia Del Sol – Algo Simple – Hacienda Records 2001

=== Single releases ===
- "America" – PBS 2002

=== Compilations ===
- Gather Around – Algo Simple for The Evelyn Rivers Project 2002

=== Special guest appearance ===
- WTAMU Jazz – WTAMU Jazz Band I – WTAMU Records
- Destiny – Gregg Diamond – Papalote Records 2005

=== Television appearances / video documentaries ===
- Celebrate America! PBS 2002
- Southwest Expressions PBS 2007
