= Tex Randall =

Cowboy structure in Canyon, Texas, U.S.

General information
- Location: Next to U.S. Route 60 in Canyon, Texas
- Completed: 1959

Height
- Height: 47 feet

Tex Randall is a 47-foot (14 m) tall cowboy figure constructed in 1959 next to U.S. Route 60 in Canyon, Texas. It weighs seven tons and is made of cement and steel.

The statue was constructed in 1959 by local shop teacher Harry Wheeler to advertise for a western wear store directly next to it. It originally featured a bandanna, a western-style shirt and real denim jeans. When Highway 60 was rerouted through an underpass, traffic to the store declined and it closed. The statue gradually fell into disrepair as high winds shredded the jeans, a truck crashed into the left boot, and the cigarette was shot from his hand. In 1987, a campaign began to repair the statue, which resulted in a different appearance: the remains of the cigarette were replaced with a spur and new paint gave him different clothing and a moustache. Without further maintenance, the statue again fell into disrepair until 2013, when the Texas Department of Transportation constructed a park underneath and around the statue. A new campaign funded the restoration of the statue to more closely resemble its original appearance. The restoration was completed in 2016.

The statue was named an official Canyon landmark in 2017.
