= Randall High School =

Location
- 9201 South Bell; Amarillo, Texas 79118-5005; United States; 35.11288°N 101.89957°W

Information
- School type: Public high school
- Opened: 1988
- School district: Canyon Independent School District
- Principal: Travis Willard
- Teaching staff: 77.63 (on an FTE basis)
- Grades: 9-12
- Enrollment: 1,081 (2023–2024)
- Student to teacher ratio: 13.93
- Colors: Black, white, and silver
- Athletics conference: UIL Class 5A District 3
- Mascot: Raider
- Newspaper: Silver Streak
- Yearbook: Treasure Chest
- Website: Randall High School

Randall High School is a public high school located in the city limits of Amarillo, Texas (US). It is part of the Canyon Independent School District located in north central Randall County and classified as a 4A school by the UIL. In 2015, the school was rated "Met Standard" by the Texas Education Agency.

== Facilities and athletics ==
Campus facilities

- West Building
  - Includes classrooms, offices, library, student commons, two basketball courts, and auditorium.
- Industry Building
  - Includes classrooms and shops for various specialized classes such as architecture and agriculture.
- Athletic Facilities
  - Football/soccer field, baseball and softball diamonds, 14 tennis courts, weight room, trainers facility, wrestling complex, field house.

Athletics

The Randall Raiders compete in the following sports -

Cross Country, Volleyball, Football, Basketball, Wrestling, Soccer, Powerlifting, Golf, Tennis, Track, Softball & Baseball, Bowling.

Happy State Bank Stadium serves as Randall's home football venue.

=== State titles ===
- Girls Basketball -
  - 1992(4A), 1998(4A)
- Boys Cross Country -
  - 1988(4A), 1989(4A)
- Girls Cross Country -
  - 2013(4A), 2014(5A), 2016(5A), 2023(4A)
- Volleyball -
  - 2009(4A), 2022(4A)
- Boys Wrestling -
  - 2008(All), 2009(All) 2013(4A) 2018(4A) 2019(4A) 2020(4A) 2021(4A)
- Boys Golf
  - 2023(4A)
- Girls Soccer
  - 2025(4A)

== Notable alumni ==
- Aaron Watson (1995), country music artist
- Heston Kjerstad (2017), outfielder for the Baltimore Orioles
