= Canyon, Texas =

- City
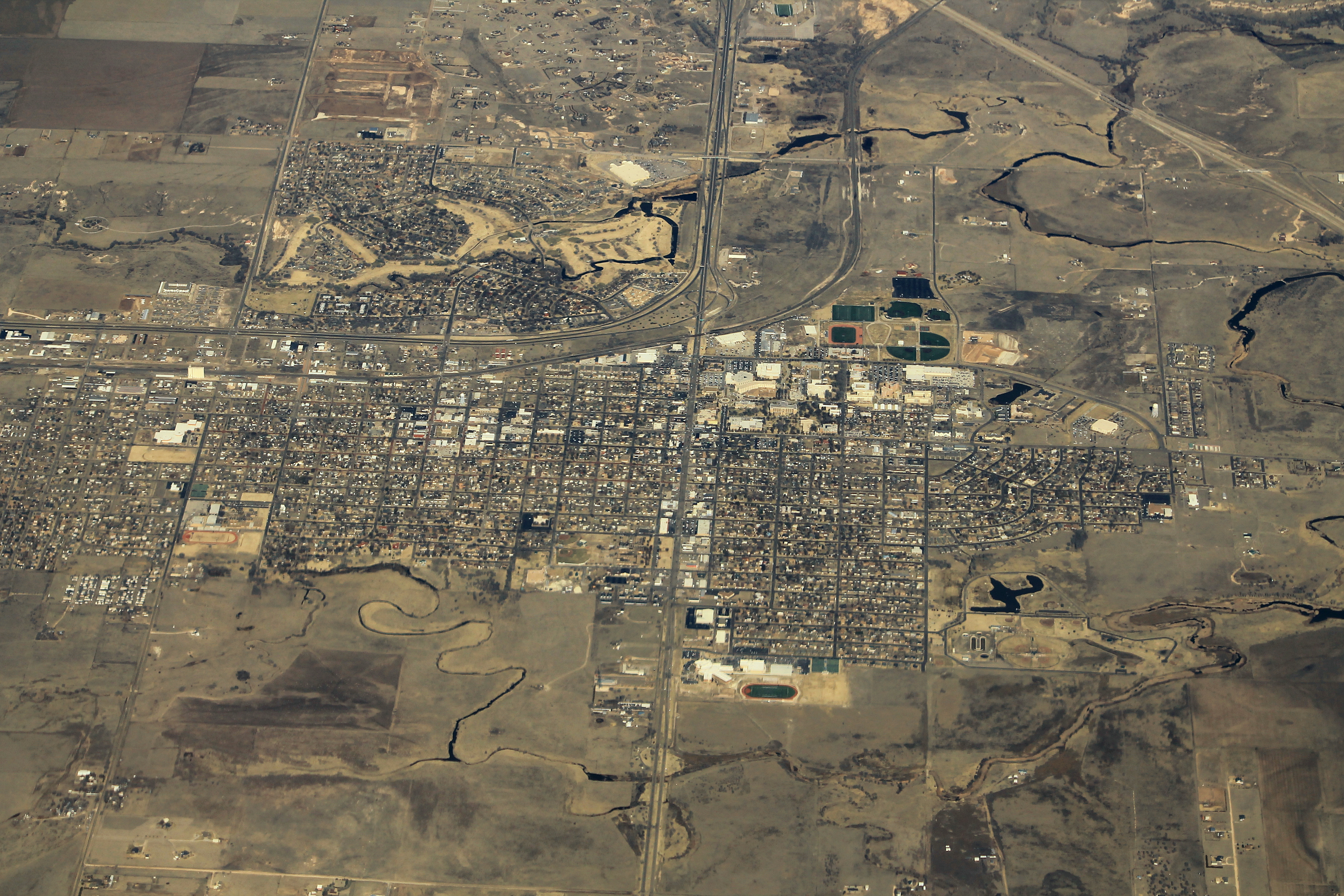
- Aerial view of Canyon, Texas

- Nickname: Gateway to Palo Duro Canyon
- Motto: "Feels like home..."
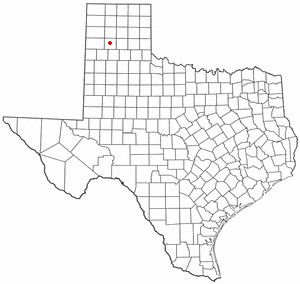
- Location in the state of Texas

- Coordinates: 34°59′26″N 101°55′09″W
- Country: United States
- State: Texas
- County: Randall

Government
  - Mayor: Gary Hinders

Area
  - Total: 7.88 sq mi (20.40 km^{2})
  - Land: 7.85 sq mi (20.34 km^{2})
  - Water: 0.027 sq mi (0.07 km^{2})
- Elevation: 3,511 ft (1,070 m)

Population (2020)
  - Total: 14,836
  - Density: 1,883.6/sq mi (727.25/km^{2})
- Time zone: UTC−6 (CST)
  - Summer (DST): UTC−5 (CDT)
- ZIP codes: 79015-79016
- Area code: 806
- FIPS code: 48-12532
- GNIS feature ID: 2409978
- Website: www.canyontx.gov

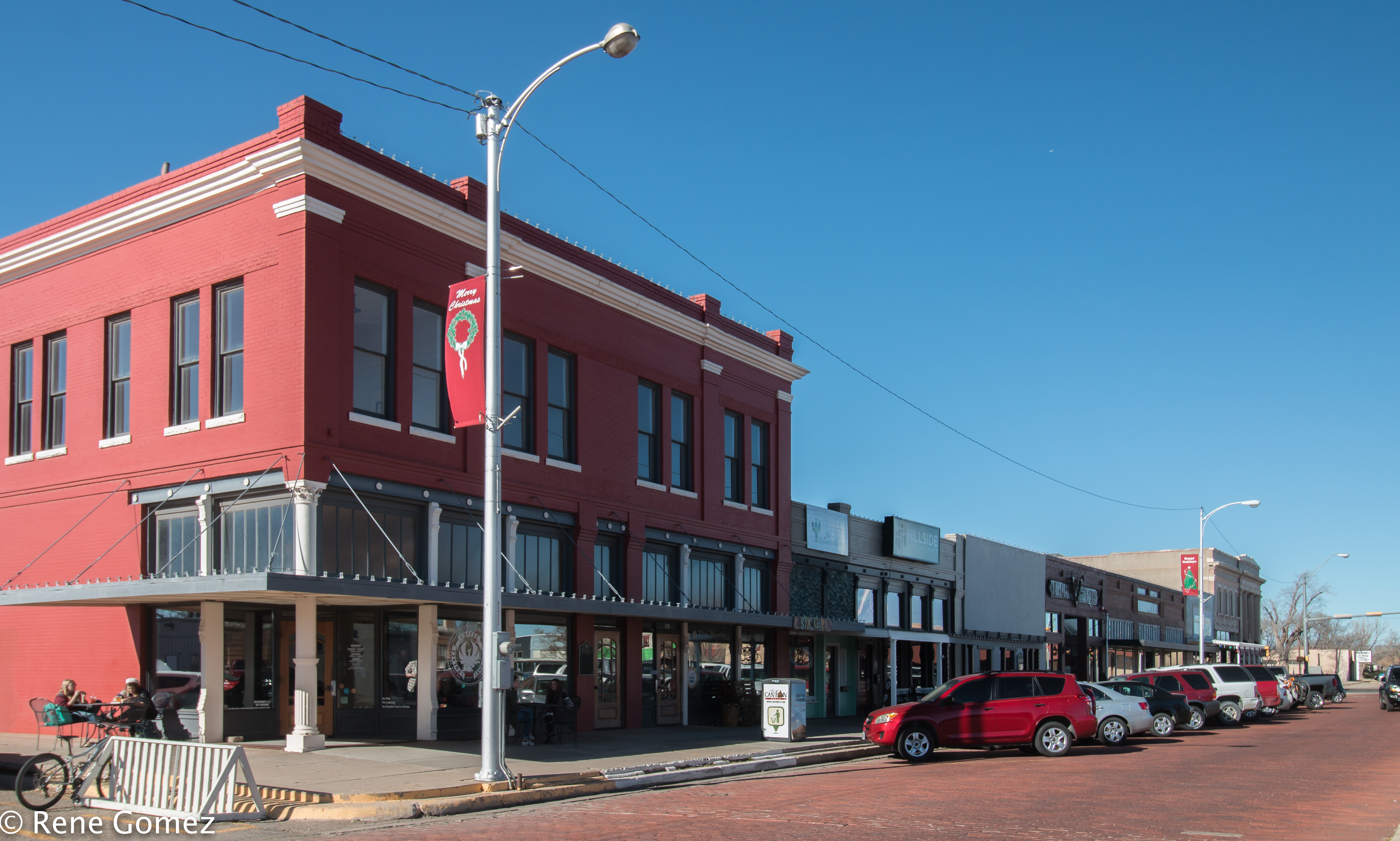
Downtown Canyon

Canyon is a city in and the county seat of Randall County, Texas, United States. The population was 14,836 at the 2020 census. It is part of the Amarillo metropolitan area. Canyon is the home of the Panhandle–Plains Historical Museum, and the outdoor musical drama Texas. The city is also home to the main campus of West Texas A&M University.

== History ==
Canyon was founded by L. G. Conner. The JA Ranch is east of Canyon.

The Tex Randall statue, a 47-foot (14 m) tall cowboy next to U.S. Route 60, was constructed in 1959 and designated an official Canyon landmark in 2017.

== Geography ==
According to the United States Census Bureau, Canyon has a total area of 4.9 square miles (13 km^{2}), all land. The city itself lies in a valley that eventually becomes Palo Duro Canyon to the east.

=== Climate ===
Climate data for Canyon, Texas (1991–2020 normals, extremes 1950–present)
Month	Jan	Feb	Mar	Apr	May	Jun	Jul	Aug	Sep	Oct	Nov	Dec	Year
Record high °F (°C)	79 (26)	88 (31)	100 (38)	99 (37)	103 (39)	109 (43)	109 (43)	105 (41)	105 (41)	98 (37)	90 (32)	83 (28)	109 (43)
Mean daily maximum °F (°C)	52.3 (11.3)	56.0 (13.3)	64.6 (18.1)	72.6 (22.6)	81.5 (27.5)	90.3 (32.4)	92.7 (33.7)	91.1 (32.8)	84.3 (29.1)	74.1 (23.4)	61.5 (16.4)	52.0 (11.1)	72.8 (22.7)
Daily mean °F (°C)	37.4 (3.0)	40.4 (4.7)	48.8 (9.3)	57.1 (13.9)	67.0 (19.4)	76.3 (24.6)	79.7 (26.5)	78.3 (25.7)	70.7 (21.5)	59.3 (15.2)	46.9 (8.3)	37.8 (3.2)	58.3 (14.6)
Mean daily minimum °F (°C)	22.6 (−5.2)	24.7 (−4.1)	33.0 (0.6)	41.6 (5.3)	52.5 (11.4)	62.3 (16.8)	66.8 (19.3)	65.4 (18.6)	57.2 (14.0)	44.4 (6.9)	32.3 (0.2)	23.7 (−4.6)	43.9 (6.6)
Record low °F (°C)	−12 (−24)	−14 (−26)	0 (−18)	19 (−7)	25 (−4)	40 (4)	51 (11)	47 (8)	29 (−2)	15 (−9)	3 (−16)	−6 (−21)	−14 (−26)
Average precipitation inches (mm)	0.59 (15)	0.40 (10)	1.06 (27)	0.99 (25)	2.25 (57)	2.68 (68)	2.26 (57)	3.03 (77)	1.90 (48)	1.98 (50)	0.68 (17)	0.63 (16)	18.45 (469)
Average snowfall inches (cm)	1.8 (4.6)	0.8 (2.0)	0.8 (2.0)	0.4 (1.0)	0.0 (0.0)	0.0 (0.0)	0.0 (0.0)	0.0 (0.0)	0.0 (0.0)	0.4 (1.0)	1.3 (3.3)	2.1 (5.3)	7.6 (19)
Average precipitation days (≥ 0.01 in)	2.5	2.7	3.6	3.8	5.7	7.0	5.7	6.5	4.1	4.6	2.5	2.5	51.2
Average snowy days (≥ 0.1 in)	1.2	0.7	0.3	0.0	0.0	0.0	0.0	0.0	0.0	0.1	0.5	0.9	3.7
Source: NOAA

== Demographics ==
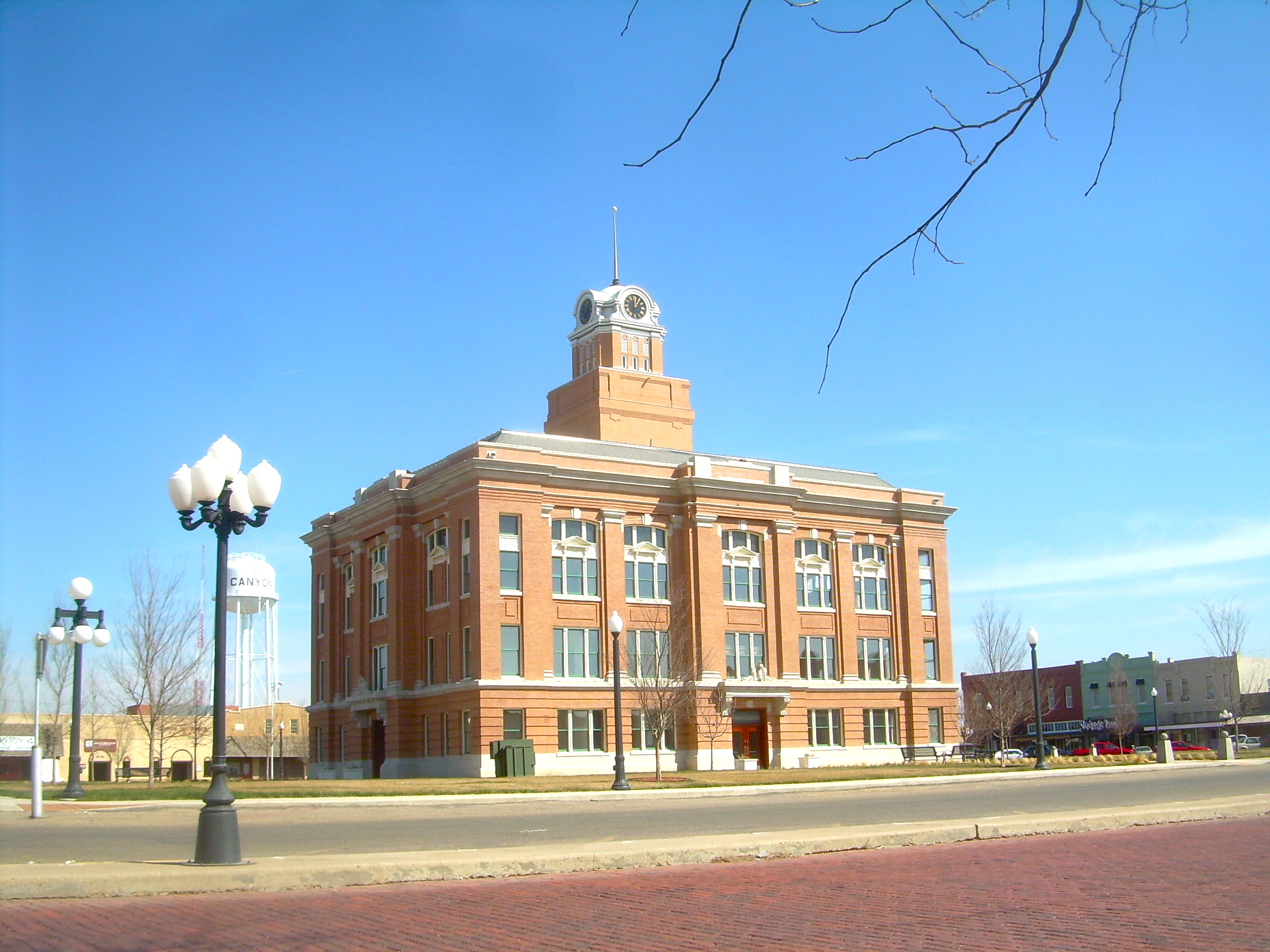
Randall County Courthouse in downtown Canyon, Texas

Historical population
Census	Pop.	Note	%±
1910	1,400		—
1920	1,618		15.6%
1930	2,821		74.4%
1940	2,622		−7.1%
1950	4,364		66.4%
1960	5,864		34.4%
1970	8,333		42.1%
1980	10,724		28.7%
1990	11,365		6.0%
2000	12,875		13.3%
2010	13,303		3.3%
2020	14,836		11.5%
U.S. Decennial Census

=== 2020 census ===
Canyon racial composition (NH = Non-Hispanic) (Note: Note: The Non-Hispanic columns exclude Latinos from the racial categories and assign them to a separate category, while the rightmost column reports each race's share of the total population regardless of Hispanic origin.)
Race	Non-Hispanic number	Non-Hispanic percentage	Percent (any race)
White (NH)	10,490	70.71%	78.2%
Black or African American (NH)	536	3.61%	3.9%
Native American or Alaska Native (NH)	120	0.81%	0.9%
Asian (NH)	187	1.26%	1.3%
Pacific Islander (NH)	7	0.05%	<0.1%
Some Other Race (NH)	62	0.42%	6.3%
Mixed/Multi-Racial (NH)	529	3.57%	9.3%
Hispanic or Latino	2,905	19.58%	19.6%
Total	14,836	100.0%	100.0%

As of the 2020 census, there were 14,836 people, 5,698 households, and 3,444 families residing in the city.

The median age was 26.8 years. 20.4% of residents were under the age of 18 and 12.1% of residents were 65 years of age or older. For every 100 females there were 95.4 males, and for every 100 females age 18 and over there were 95.0 males age 18 and over.

99.1% of residents lived in urban areas, while 0.9% lived in rural areas.

There were 5,698 households in Canyon, of which 29.7% had children under the age of 18 living in them. Of all households, 42.6% were married-couple households, 19.9% were households with a male householder and no spouse or partner present, and 31.5% were households with a female householder and no spouse or partner present. About 31.9% of all households were made up of individuals and 10.1% had someone living alone who was 65 years of age or older.

There were 6,504 housing units, of which 12.4% were vacant. Among occupied housing units, 49.6% were owner-occupied and 50.4% were renter-occupied. The homeowner vacancy rate was 3.1% and the rental vacancy rate was 14.2%.

=== 2010 census ===
At the 2010 census, 13,303 people, 5,185 households and 2,924 families resided in the city. The population density was 2,687.47 inhabitants per square mile (1,037.64/km^{2}). The 5,611 housing units averaged 1,133.54 per square mile (437.68/km^{2}). The racial makeup of the city was 88.5% White, 2.4% African American, 0.7% Native American, 1.8% Asian, 0.1% Pacific Islander, 4.7% from other races, and 2% from two or more races. Hispanics or Latinos of any race were 15.7% of the population.

Of the 5,185 households, 27.8% had children under the age of 18 living with them, 42.5% were married couples living together, 10.2% had a female householder with no husband present, 3.6% had a male householder with no wife present, and 43.6% were not families. About 31.8% of all households were made up of individuals, and 8.9% had someone living alone who was 65 years of age or older. The average household size was 2.32 and the average family size was 2.99.

The population was distributed as 21.4% under the age of 18, 18.6% from 20 to 24, 22.3% from 25 to 44, 15.3% from 45 to 64, and 9.6% who were 65 years of age or older. The median age was 25 years. For every 100 females, there were 93.6 males. For every 100 females age 18 and over, there were 90.5 males.

The median household income was $32,361 and the median family income was $46,250. Males had a median income of $34,338 versus $25,255 for females. The per capita income for the city was $16,292. About 8.1% of families and 14.3% of the population were below the poverty line, including 10.2% of those under age 18 and 10.3% of those age 65 or over.

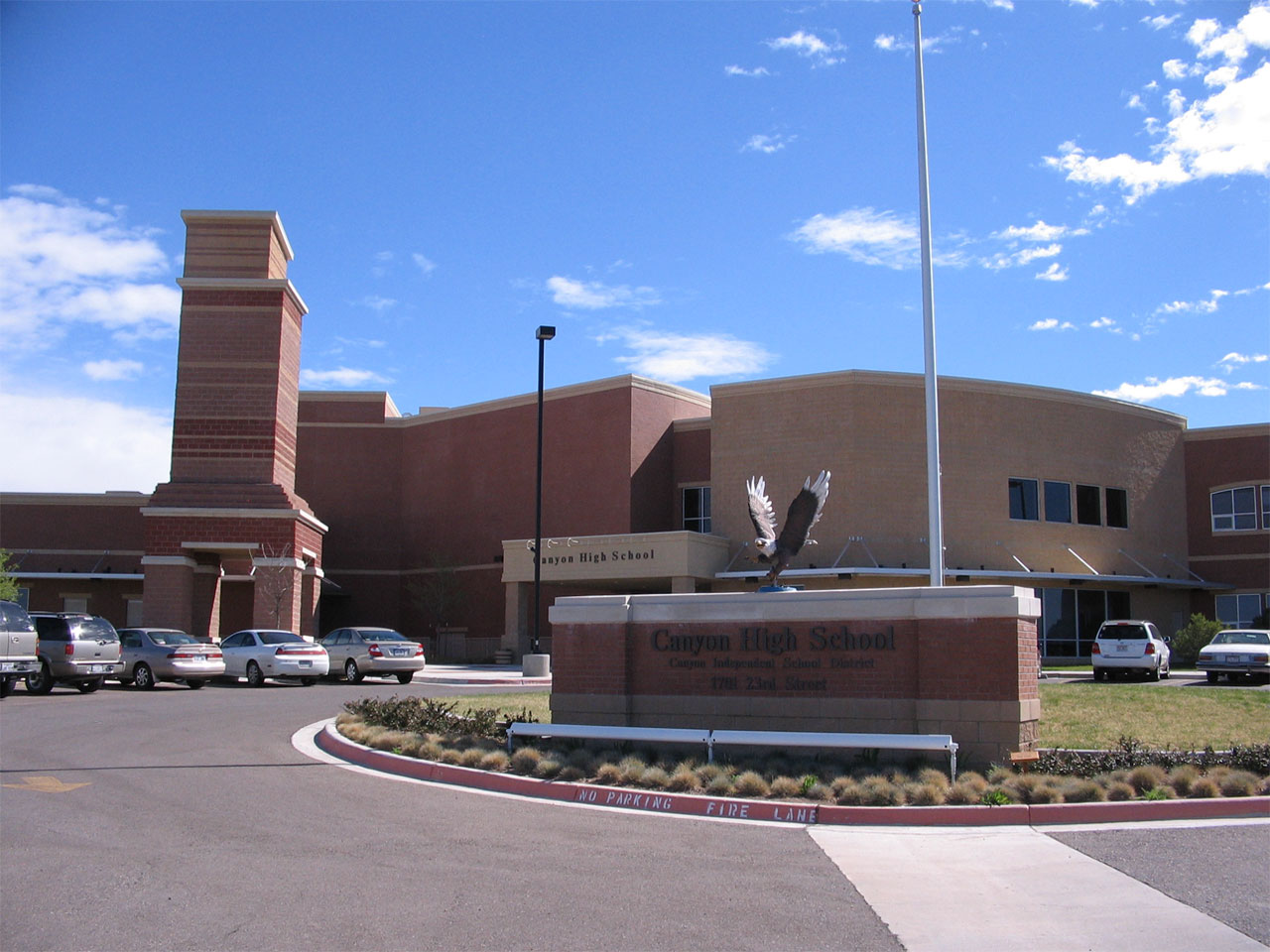
Canyon High School

== Education ==
Public education in Canyon is served by the Canyon Independent School District. Currently, there are three high schools in the Canyon Independent School District, Canyon High School, Randall High School, and West Plains High School, all with their respective junior high campuses. The current mascots are the Canyon Eagles, Randall Raiders, and West Plains Wolves, which reach to the junior campuses as well. Randall and West Plains campuses reside in the nearby city of Amarillo.

Some students in Canyon, TX play soccer at the Brown Road Soccer Complex on the west side of town.

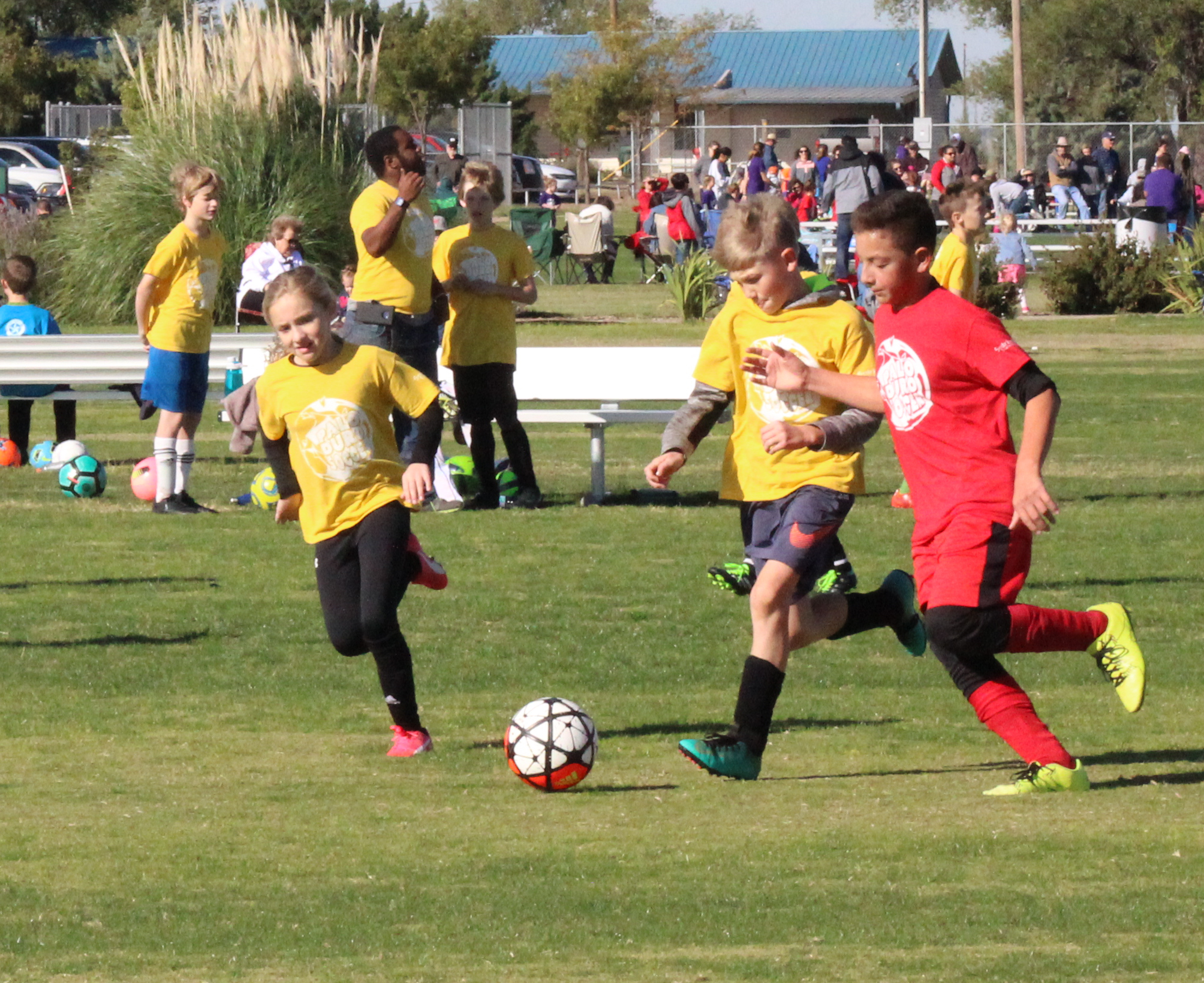
Intermediate school and junior high students playing soccer at Brown Road Soccer Complex in Canyon

Canyon is the home of West Texas A&M University, the main campus is located near the city center.

=== Sport ===
Canyon is home to the West Texas A&M Buffaloes.

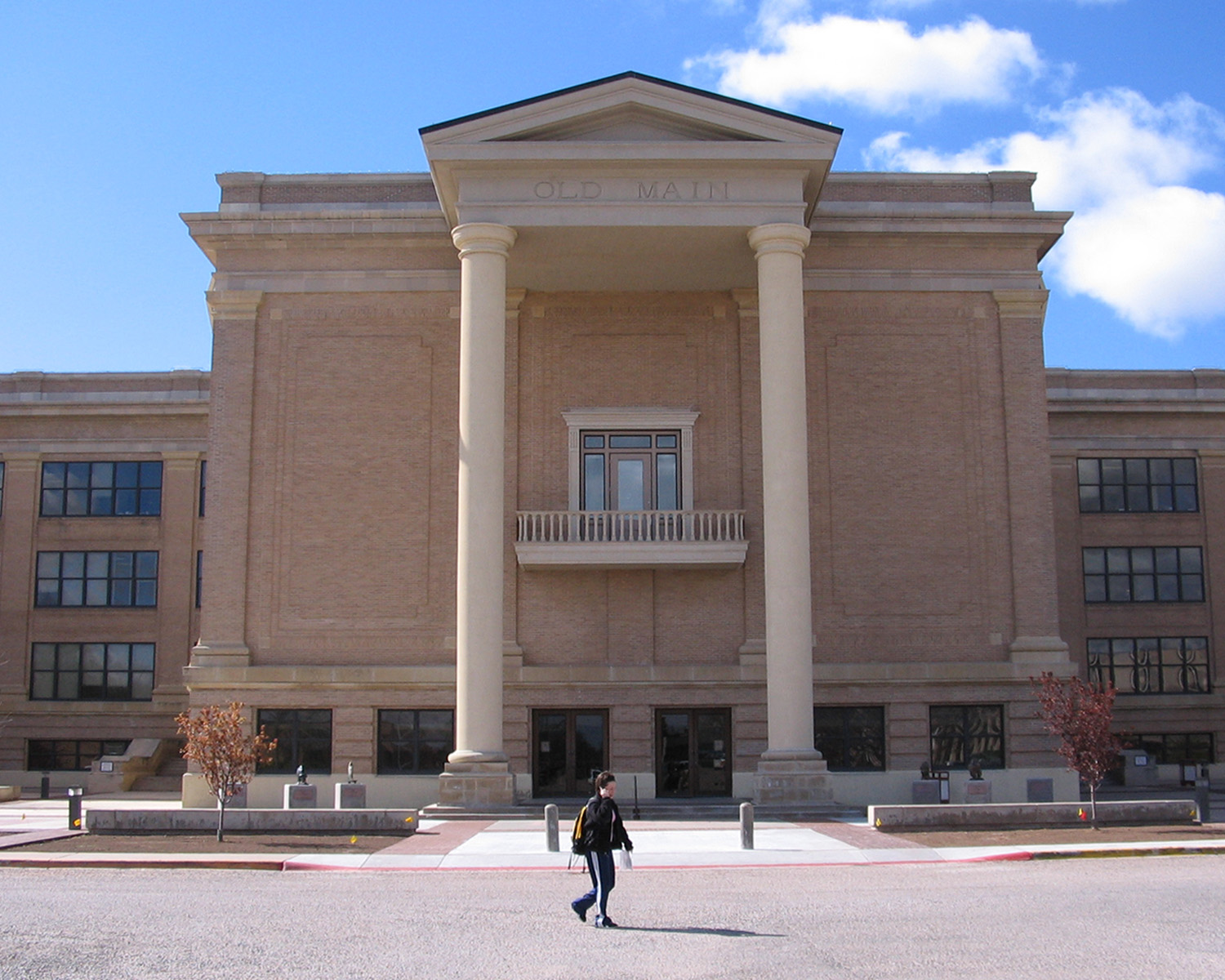
West Texas A&M University Old Main Building

== Points of interest ==
- Tallest wind turbine in the United States. It is a GW 3MW(S) Wind Turbine with a nacelle height of 130 metres and a total height of 199.2 metres situated at 34.967324 N 101.789980 W.

== Notable people ==
- Houston Bright, composer who taught for three decades at West Texas A&M University
- Harold Bugbee, Western artist and the former curator of Panhandle-Plains Museum
- Cody Campbell, energy investor, former football player, and major Texas Tech Red Raiders booster (born in Lubbock, but grew up in Canyon and graduated from Canyon High School)
- Terry Funk, professional wrestler and actor
- Blair Garner, syndicated radio host
- Bryan A. Garner, editor-in-chief of Black's Law Dictionary, author, and teacher
- Margaret Pease Harper, educator, musician and originator of Texas
- Mark Lair, Hall of Fame bridge player
- Georgia O'Keeffe, artist, lived in Canyon (1916–1918), inspired by the beauty of the Palo Duro country
- Carmen Espinoza-Rodriquez, singer/songwriter
- Jake Rogers, MLB catcher for the Chicago White Sox
- Brandon Schneider, women's basketball head coach at the University of Kansas; born in Canyon
- Candi Whitaker, women's basketball head coach at Texas Tech; born in Canyon

== See also ==
- West Texas A&M University
- West Texas A&M Buffaloes
- Palo Duro Canyon State Park is 12 miles east of Canyon.
