= Canyon Independent School District =

School district in Texas, United States

Address
- 3301 N. 23rd St. Texas Panhandle Canyon South Amarillo, Randall, Texas, 79015; United States
- Coordinates: 35°01′07″N 101°55′14″W

District information
- Type: Public
- Motto: Empowering Lifelong Success
- Grades: PK-12
- Established: 1895
- Superintendent: Dr. Darryl Flusche
- Asst. superintendent(s): Robyn Cranmer; Cameron Rosser; Heather Wilson
- School board: 7 Members: Bruce Cobb; Bill Jenkins; Matt Parker; Jennifer Winegarner; Randy Darnell; Linda Hinders; Katharyn Wiegand
- Chair of the board: Bruce Cobb
- Governing agency: Texas Education Agency
- Schools: Elementary 8 Middle 6 High 4 Alternative 1
- Budget: $69,965,632 (2016-2017)
- NCES District ID: 4812810

Students and staff
- Students: 10,166 (2018-2019)
- Teachers: 626.20 (FTE)
- Staff: 1,168.89 (FTE)
- Student–teacher ratio: 16.23

Other information
- Schedule: https://www.canyonisd.net/about/calendar/
- Website: https://www.canyonisd.net/

Canyon Independent School District is a school district that serves the Canyon and Amarillo area in Randall County of the Texas Panhandle. The district covers a large area, which encompasses 732 square miles. The north end of the district has nine campuses in south Amarillo, with five in Canyon and one campus located between the two cities.

In 2009, the school district was rated "academically acceptable" by the Texas Education Agency.

In 2018, the district was recognized for innovation as a Google Reference District.

== Demographics ==
According to the National Center for Education Statistics, Canyon Independent School District serves a community of 60,755 people with a Median Household Income of $74,886. 7.6% of the families in the Canyon ISD live below the poverty level. Total households in the community is 21,443.

Race/Ethnicity of Canyon ISD:

- White: 80%
- Hispanic or Latino (of any race): 20%
- Black: 0%
- Asian: 0%

== High schools ==
Canyon Independent School District has three high schools. Each high school is listed with their known GreatSchools rating.

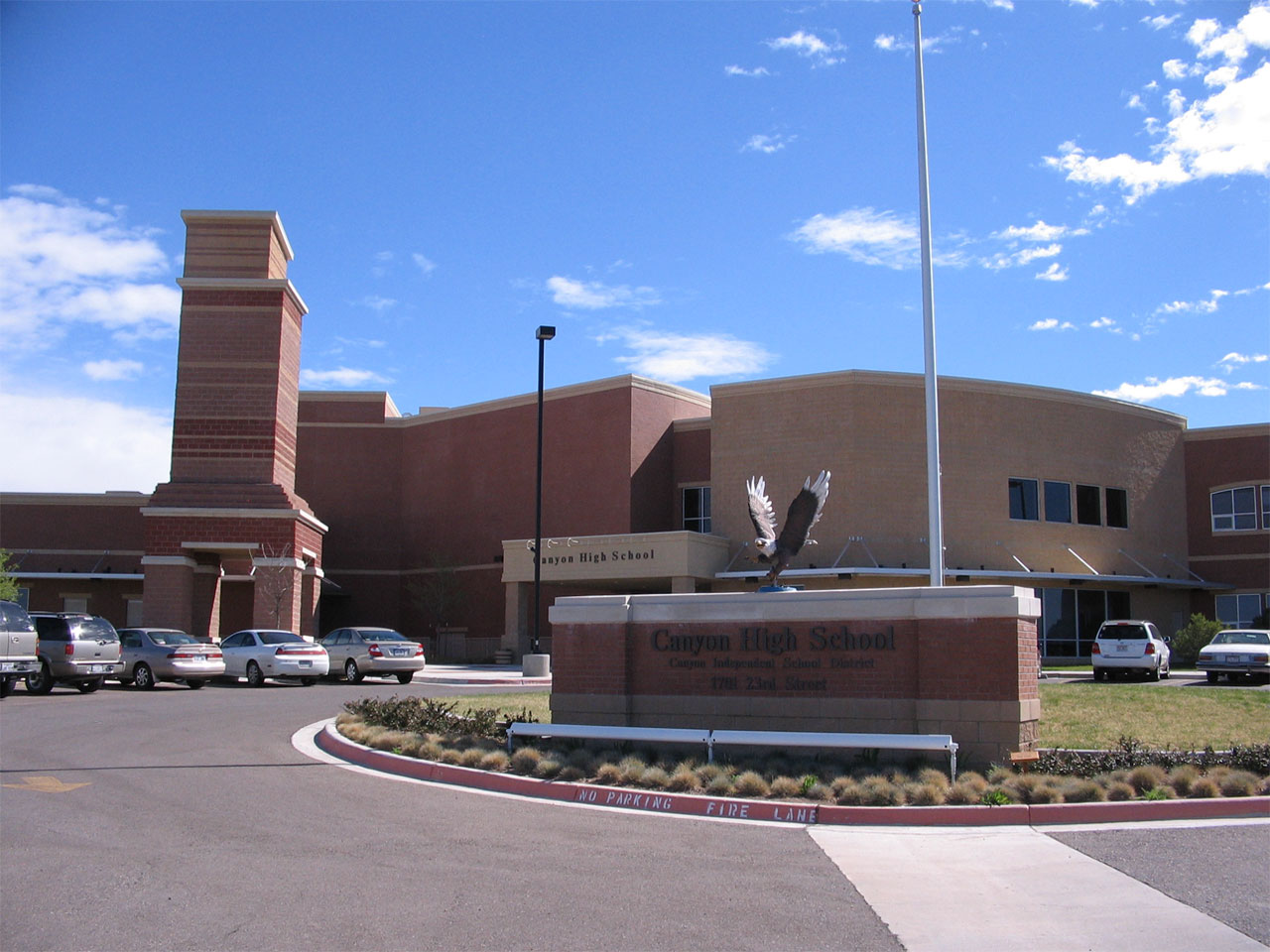
The new Canyon High School opened in August 2004.

- Canyon High School (Canyon, Texas)
- Midway Alternative High School (Canyon, Texas)
- Randall High School (Amarillo, Texas)
- West Plains High School (Amarillo, Texas)

== Junior High & Intermediate Schools ==
- Canyon Junior High School (Canyon, Texas)
- Canyon Intermediate School (Canyon, Texas)
- Greenways Intermediate School (Amarillo, Texas)
- Pinnacle Intermediate School (Amarillo, Texas)
- Randall Junior High School (Amarillo, Texas)
- West Plains Junior High School (Amarillo, Texas)

== Elementary schools ==
Canyon Independent School District has eight Elementary Schools.

- Arden Road Elementary School (Amarillo, Texas)
- City View Elementary School (Amarillo, Texas)
- Crestview Elementary School (Amarillo, Texas)
- Gene Howe Elementary School (Amarillo, Texas)
- Heritage Hills Elementary School - (Amarillo, Texas)
- Hillside Elementary School (Amarillo, Texas)
- Lakeview Elementary School (Amarillo, Texas)
- Reeves-Hinger Elementary School (Amarillo, Texas)
- Spring Canyon Elementary School (Canyon, Texas)
- Sundown Lane Elementary School (Amarillo, Texas)

== Controversy ==
Superintendent Darryl Flusche announced that the Bible had been removed from the shelves of the school library to avoid transgressing a state statute protecting students from sexually explicit or vulgar content.

== See also ==
- List of school districts in Texas
