= Palo Duro Canyon =

Texas panhandle escarpment

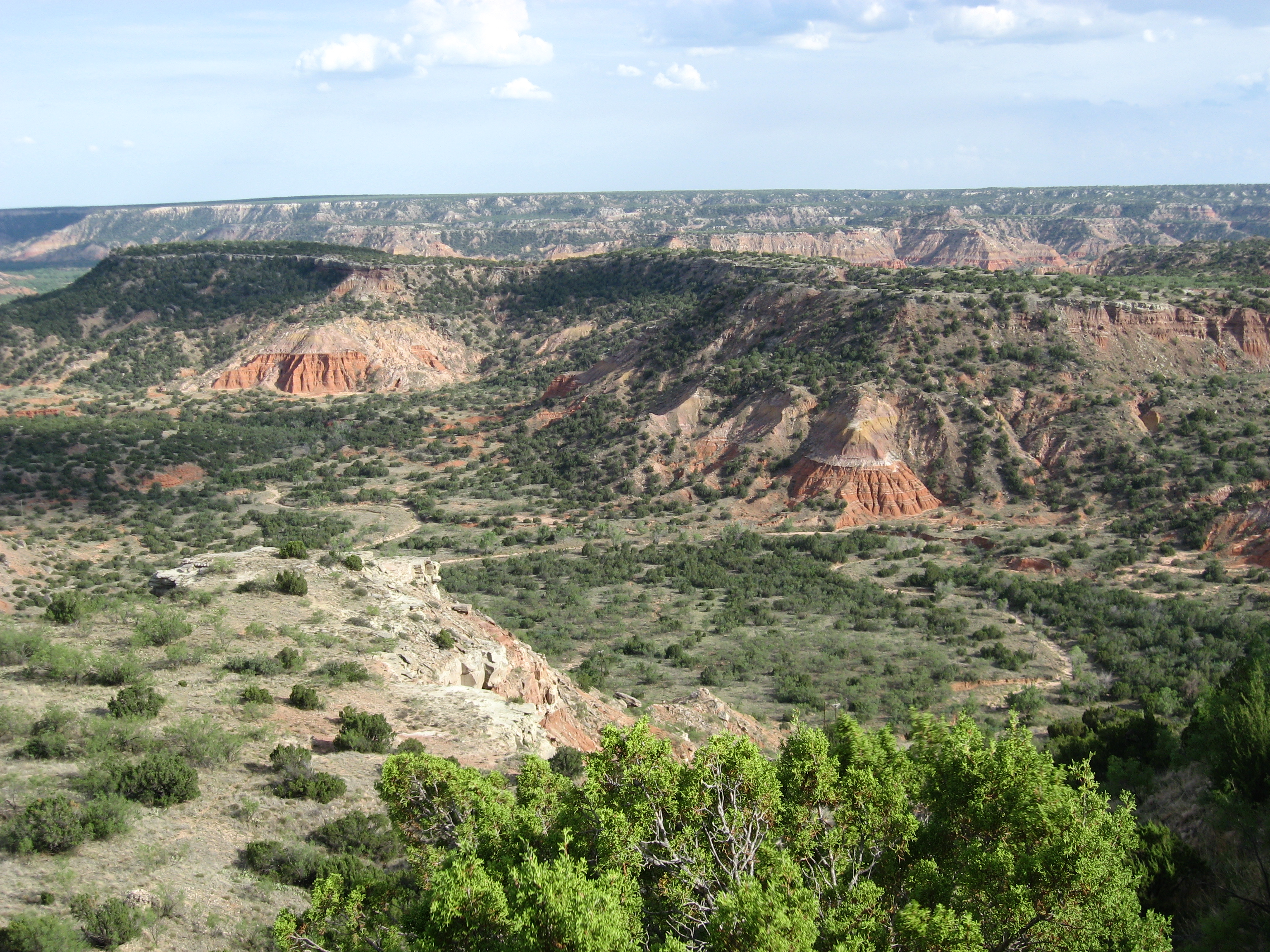
- View from the Interpretive Center

- Location within Texas Location within the United States
- Floor elevation: 2,828 ft (862 m)
- Length: 120 mi (190 km)
- Width: 20 mi (32 km)
- Depth: 800 ft (240 m)

Geography
- Coordinates: 34°57′N 101°40′W
- Rivers: Prairie Dog Town Fork Red River
- Interactive map of Palo Duro Canyon

U.S. National Natural Landmark
- Designated: 1976

Palo Duro Canyon is a canyon system of the Caprock Escarpment located in the Texas Panhandle near the cities of Amarillo and Canyon. The eighth largest canyon system in the United States, it is roughly 45 mi (72 km) long and has an average width of 6 mi (9.7 km), but reaches a width of 20 mi (32 km) at places. Its depth is around 800 ft (240 m), but in some locations, valley bottom to surrounding hills increases to 1,000 ft (300 m). Palo Duro Canyon (from the Spanish meaning "hard stick") has been named "The Grand Canyon of Texas" both for its size and for its dramatic geological features, including the multicolored layers of rock and steep mesa walls, which are similar to those in the Grand Canyon. It runs through Palo Duro Canyon State Park.

== History ==
The first evidence of human habitation of the canyon dates back about 10,000–15,000 years, and it is believed to have been continuously inhabited to the present day. Native Americans were attracted to the water of the Prairie Dog Town Fork Red River, as well as the consequent ample game, edible plants, and protection from the weather the canyon provided.

The first European explorers to discover the canyon were members of the Coronado expedition, under the Spanish crown, who visited the canyon in 1541. Apache Indians lived in Palo Duro at the time, but they were later displaced by Comanche and Kiowa tribes, who had the advantage of owning horses brought over by the Spanish. The Mescalero Apache refer to the canyon as Nił'e'agutel or "canyon in the plains." They had contact with traders, called Comancheros, in nearby New Mexico.

A United States military team under Captain Randolph B. Marcy mapped the canyon in 1852 during their search for the headwaters of the Red River. The land remained under American Indian control until a military expedition led by Colonel Ranald S. Mackenzie was sent in 1874 to remove the Indians to reservations in Oklahoma. The Mackenzie expedition captured about 1,200 of the Indians' horses and slaughtered them in nearby Tule Canyon during the Battle of Palo Duro Canyon. The Comanche and Kiowa conceded and left the area.

Charles N. Gould made a geological map of the canyon and named the formations in 1905.

== Geology ==
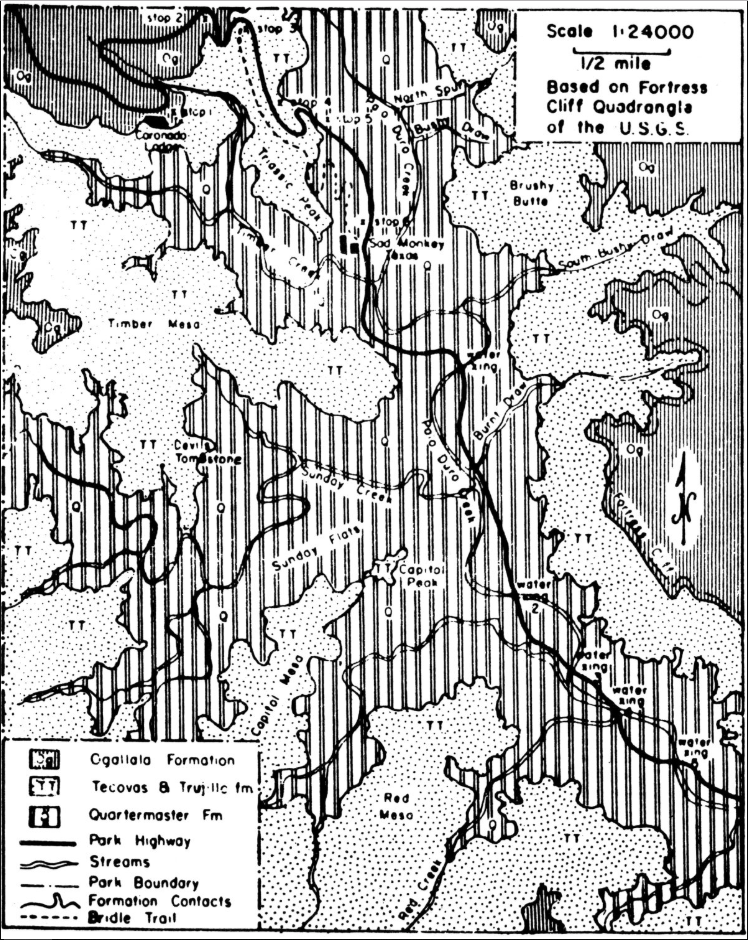
Palo Duro Canyon geological map

The canyon was formed by the Prairie Dog Town Fork Red River, which initially winds along the level surface of the Llano Estacado of West Texas, then suddenly and dramatically runs off the Caprock Escarpment. Water erosion over the millennia has shaped the canyon's geological formations.

Notable canyon formations include caves and hoodoos. One of the best-known and the major signature feature of the canyon is the Lighthouse Rock. A multiple-use, 6 mi (10 km) round-trip loop trail is dedicated to the formation.

Palo Duro Canyon was downcut by the Prairie Dog Town Fork Red River during the Pleistocene, when the whole region was uplifted. Most of the strata visible in the canyon were deposited during the Permian and Triassic periods. From oldest to youngest, and each separated by an unconformity, the formations are:

The Quartermaster Formation is Permian in age, and forms the red, lower slopes of the Canyon. This layer was deposited in a near-shore shallow-marine environment consisting of siltstones and shales with ripple marks and cross bedding, that alternated with dry tidal flats indicated by satin spar gypsum and halite cast evaporite deposits. The red color indicates periods of oxidation. The Quartermaster Formation forms the lower wall and canyon floor, averaging 60 ft (20 m) in thickness where it outcrops. In particular, this alternating red and white formation forms the steep and gullied lower portion of the north flank of Timber Mesa, with the maroon and lavender smooth slopes of the Tecovas Shale above.

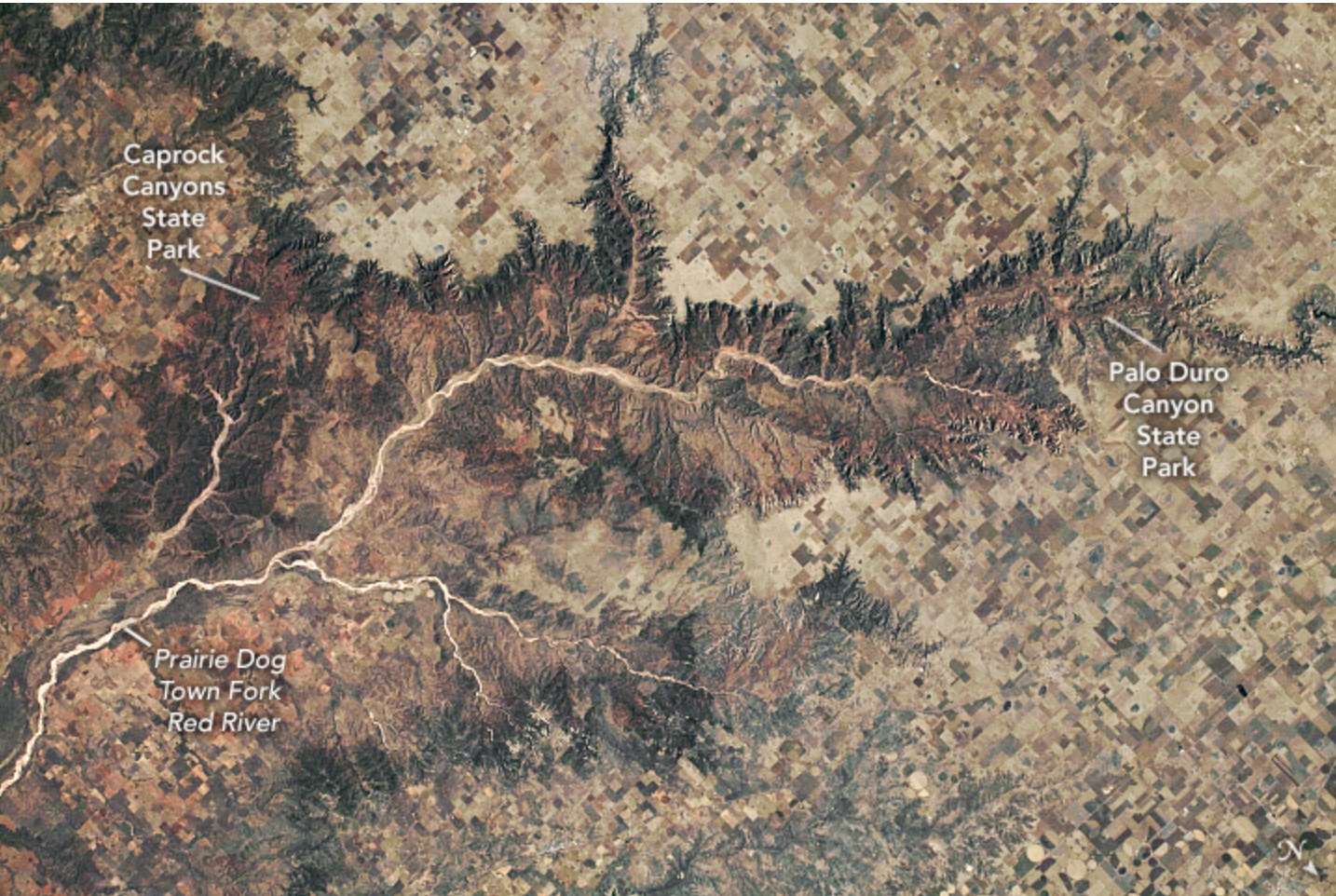
Astronaut photo of Palo Duro and Caprock Canyons in early 2022

The Tecovas Formation is a part of the Dockum Group with the Trujillo Formation. This multicolored Triassic unit consists of shale, siltstone, and sandstone. Deposited in streams and swamps, its colors indicate varying oxidizing conditions, and the alternating dry/wet cycles typical of such environments. These rocks are fossiliferous, containing the remains of phytosaurs, amphibians, and fish, including Metoposaurus, Desmatosuchus, Koskinonodon, and lungfish, besides coprolites and the petrified wood remains of Araucarioxylon. Septarian calcite concretions and calcite geodes are numerous, and the shale forms the less steep canyon walls covered by talus slopes. A prominent band of jointed white sandstone about 15 ft (5 m) thick marks the middle of this 200 ft (60 m) formation. Lavender, gray and white shales lie below this sandstone, while an orange shale lies between this sandstone and the Trujillo Formation above. The Quartermaster and Tecovas Formations make up Capitol Peak. Likewise, the lower third of Triassic Peak is composed of the deeply furrowed Quartermaster Formation, overlain by the gentle slopes and smooth surface of the Tecovas Formation shales, all capped by the weather-resistant Trujillo Formation sandstone. Large blocks of this sandstone, due to mass wasting, are found along the flanks and base of the peak.

The Trujillo Formation is a Triassic formation that is harder than the underlying Tecovas and forms many of the Canyon's ledges. Composed of coarse sandstone, river cross-bedding indicates deposition in a stream environment. Fossils are rare. The sandstone has alternating layers of shale and marl-pebble conglomerate. The formation is massively bedded sandstone, making a distinct contact with the underlying Tecovas Formation, forming cliffs, prominent benches and mesas within the canyon. The formation includes a basal, middle, and upper sandstone members, separated by shales. The middle sandstone member forms conspicuous ledges and cliffs. Phytosaur and Koskinonodon remains, plus leaf imprints and mineralized wood have been found within the formation. Erosion-resistant sandstones protect pedestals of underlying shale, giving rise to hoodoos, including the Lighthouse, and the hoodoo at the south end of Capitol Peak. Likewise, the Rock Garden is composed of Trujillo sandstone boulders.

The Ogallala Formation is a late Miocene to early Pliocene unit which forms the cliffs and ledges at the very top of the canyon. It is composed of sandstone, siltstone, and conglomerate eroded from a late Cenozoic uplift of the Rocky Mountains, and is separated from the lower Trujillo Formation by a disconformity, representing a long hiatus. The coarse, porous sedimentary units of the Ogallala Formation constitute the Ogallala Aquifer, which has historically functioned as a major source of drinking water for much of the High Plains. Fossils of saber-toothed cats (Smilodon), bone-crushing dogs (Borophagus), mastodons, horses, long-necked camels (Aepycamelus), rhinoceroses, and large tortoises up to 3 feet in length, are present in the Ogallala. The siltstone and sandstone have been cemented by silica, which gives rise to the occurrence of common opal and almost-chert pockets. The upper portion of the formation has thick deposits of caliche, very evident at the Coronado Lodge on the northwest rim of the canyon. Fortress Cliff, on the eastern rim of the canyon, has a spectacular exposure of the Ogallala Formation.

Headward erosion by the Prairie Dog Town fork of the Red River, into the caprock escarpment of the Llano Estacado, caused differential erosion. This meant the more resistant Ogallala and Trujillo formations formed the steeper walls of the canyon.

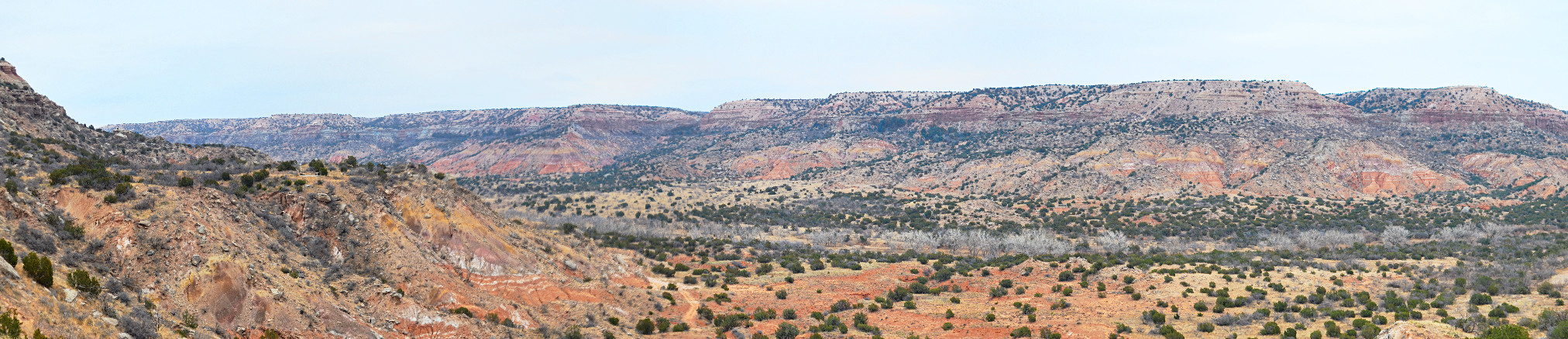
Panoramic view of the Palo Duro Canyon showing the Quartermaster, Tecovas, Trujillo, and Ogallala formations
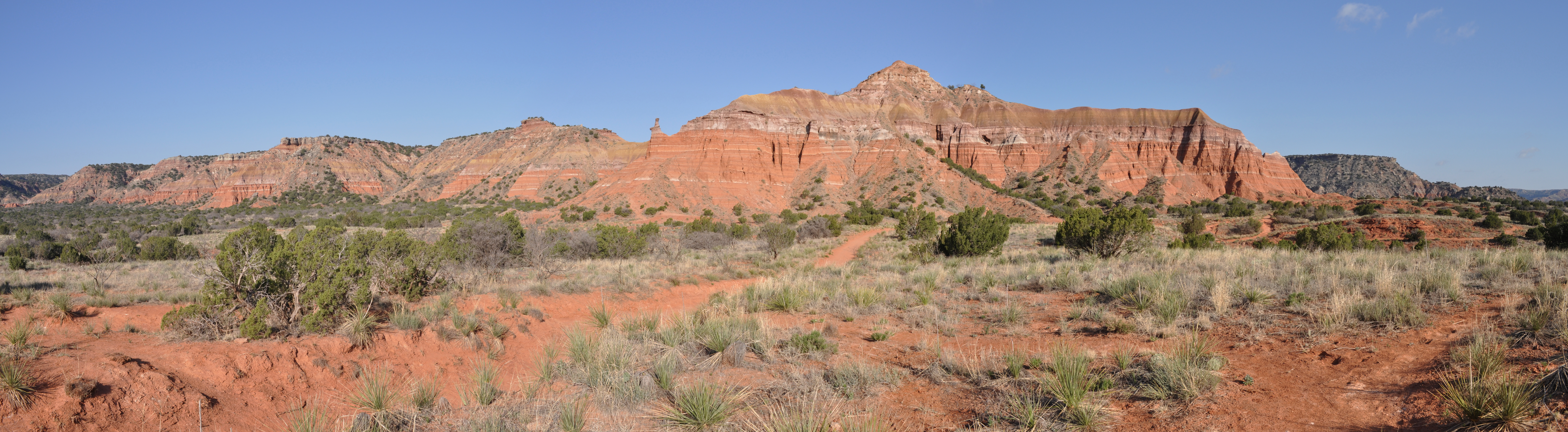
Capitol Peak

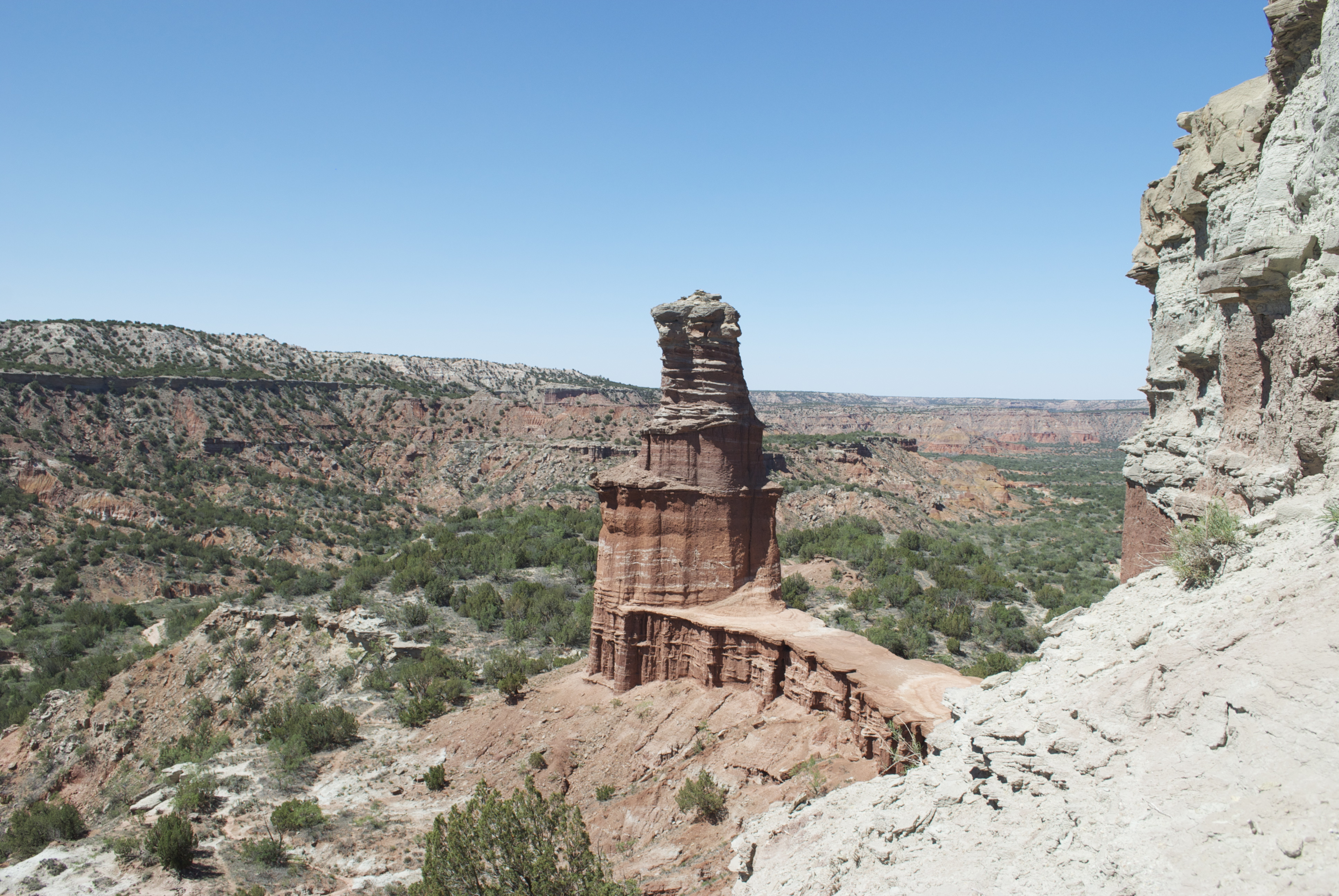
The Lighthouse Rock

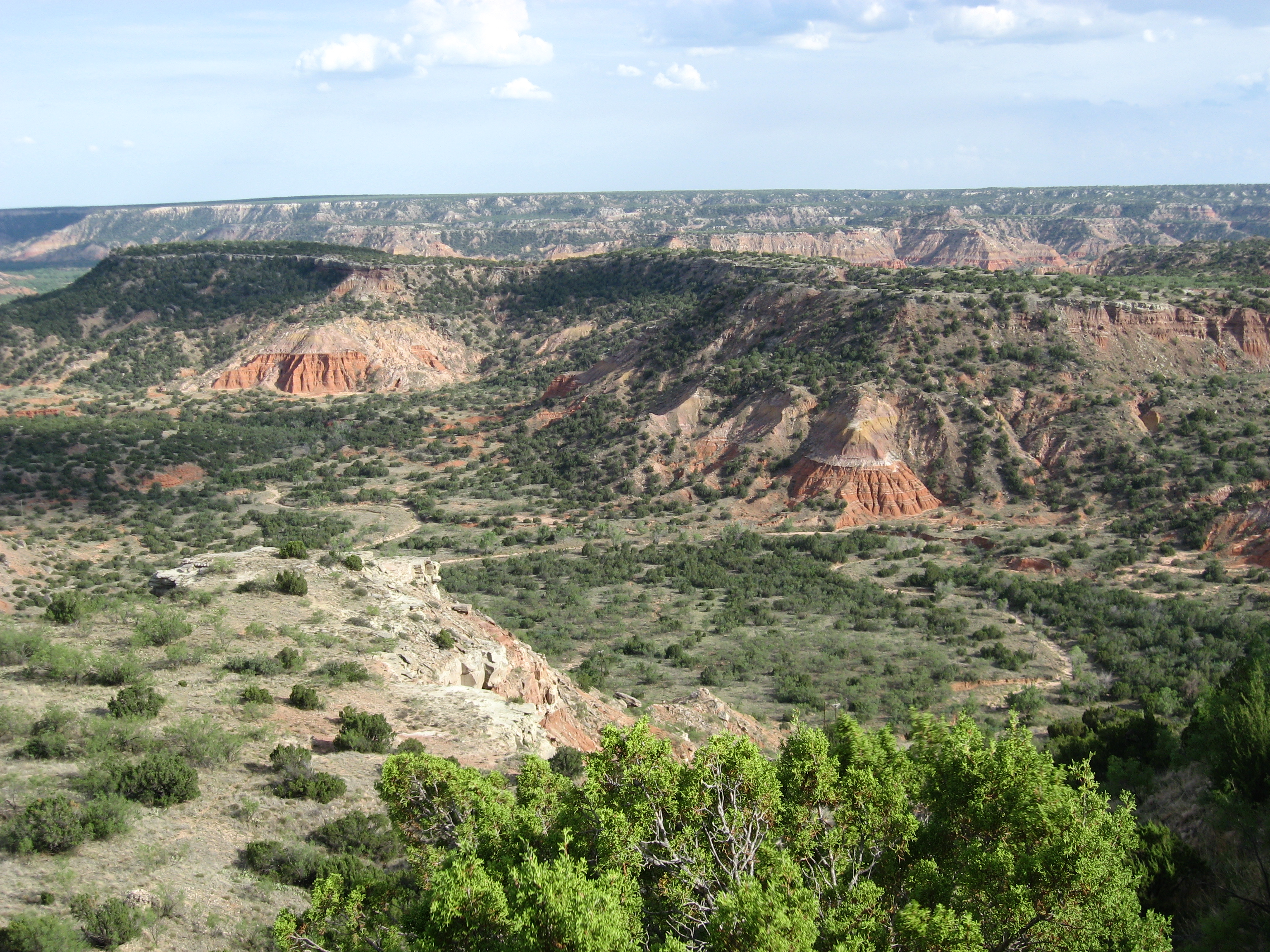

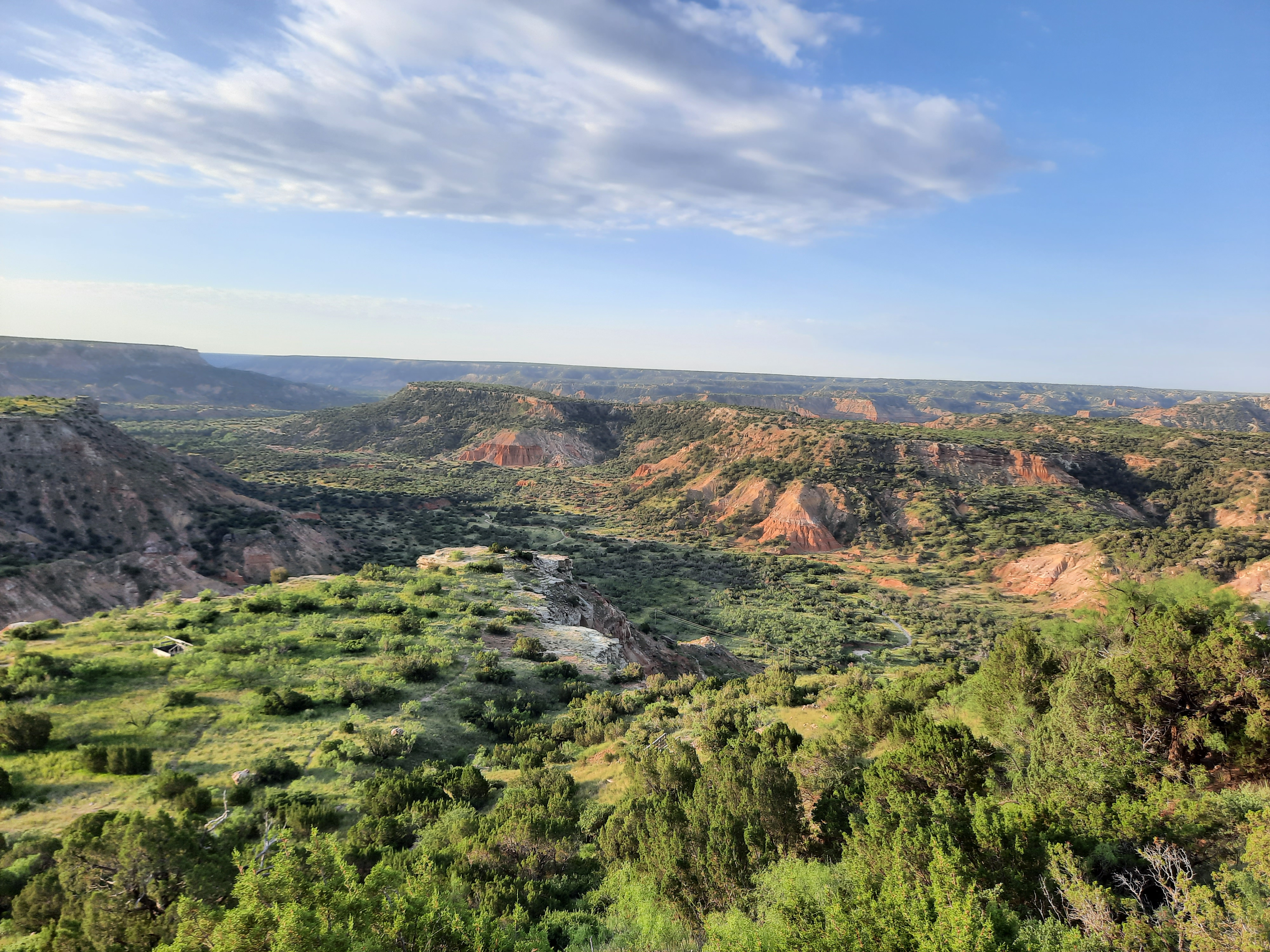

== In culture ==
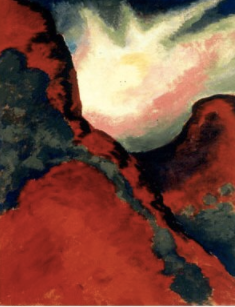
Georgia O'Keeffe, Red Landscape, oil on board, 1916–1917, Panhandle–Plains Historical Museum, West Texas A&M University

The painter Georgia O'Keeffe, who lived in nearby Amarillo and Canyon in the early 20th century, wrote of the Palo Duro: "It is a burning, seething cauldron, filled with dramatic light and color." She made paintings of Palo Duro Canyon between 1916 and 1918, when she was an instructor and head of the art department at West Texas State Normal College.

American composer Samuel Jones's Symphony No. 3 is titled "Palo Duro Canyon." It premiered May 1, 1992, in an outdoor performance at the Palo Duro Canyon State Park's Pioneer Amphitheatre, with James Setapen conducting the Amarillo Symphony (which had commissioned the work). The composer writes: "I wanted the piece ... to conjure up an intuitive awareness of the long movements of time required for the creation of a canyon. I also wanted in some way to pay homage to Native Americans, to whom this canyon was a sacred place. And I wanted to capture in music that magical moment which everyone experiences when they first see the flat, treeless High Plains fall dizzyingly away into the colorful vastness of the Palo Duro Canyon itself." A KACV-TV documentary on the canyon, composer, and symphony, titled And There Will Be Sounds, was broadcast on PBS stations nationally later that year; and a commercial recording was subsequently released by the Seattle Symphony under the baton of Gerard Schwarz. A second recording was released in 2018 as part of a multichannel SACD titled 'American Symphonies' on the Swedish BIS label, with Lance Friedel conducting the London Symphony Orchestra.

== See also ==
- Blanco Canyon
- Caprock Canyons State Park and Trailway
- Double Mountain Fork Brazos River
- Duffy's Peak
- High Plains
- Ogallala Aquifer
- Mushaway Peak
- Salt Fork Brazos River
- Texas State Highway 207
- Yellow House Canyon
- Yellow House Draw
