= Canyon High School (Canyon, Texas) =

Coordinates: 34.9661°N 101.9178°W

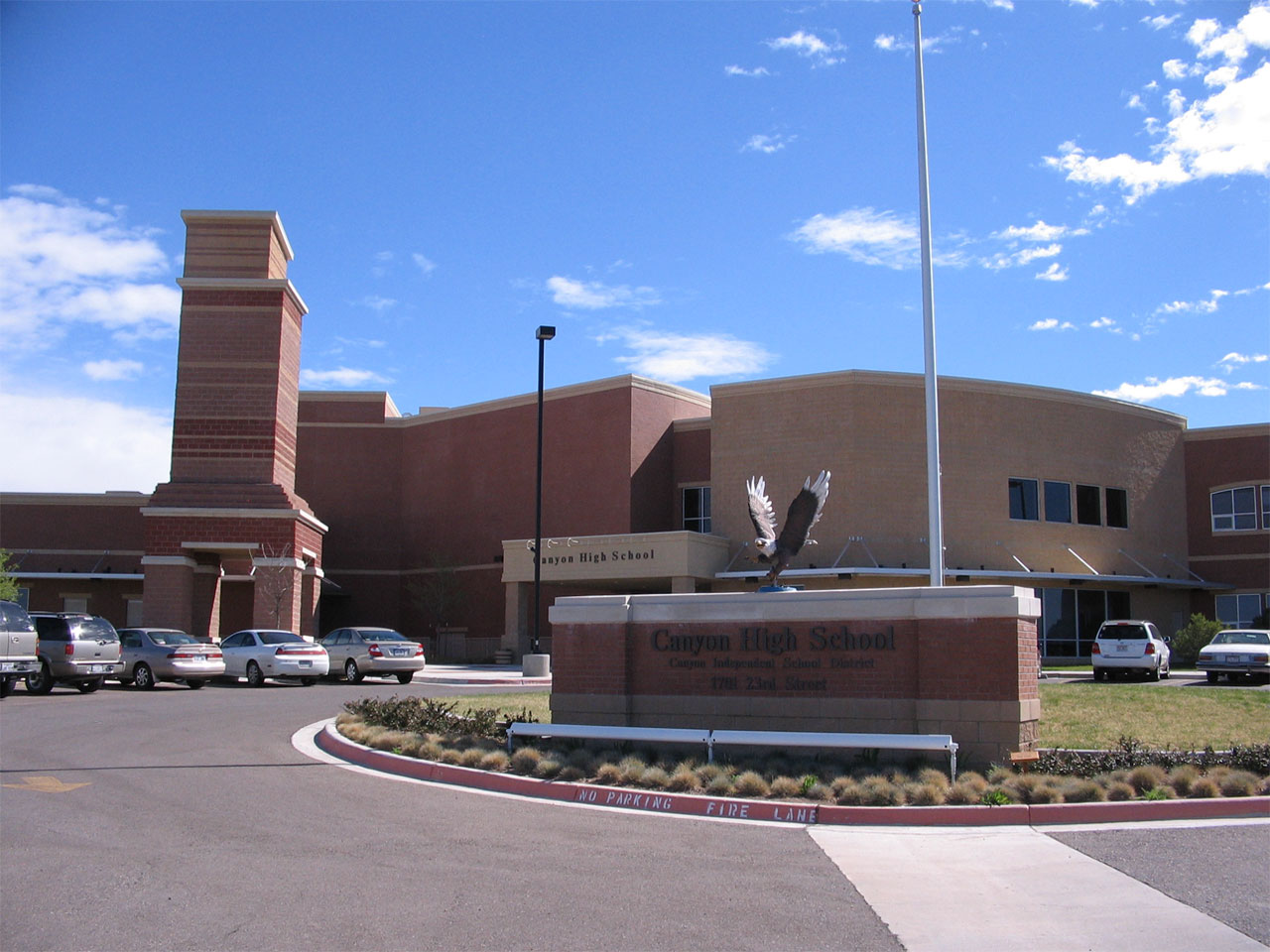

Location
- 1701 23rd St. Canyon, Texas 79015; United States

Information
- School type: Public high school
- School district: Canyon Independent School District
- Principal: Jennifer Boren
- Teaching staff: 77.52 (FTE)
- Grades: 9-12
- Enrollment: 1,100 (2023–2024)
- Student to teacher ratio: 14.19
- Colors: Purple & White
- Athletics conference: UIL Class AAAA
- Mascot: Eagle
- Newspaper: The Eagle's Tale
- Yearbook: Soaring Wings
- Website: Canyon High School

Canyon High School is a public high school located in the city limits of Canyon, Texas, United States and classified as a 4A school from 2018 by the University Interscholastic League (UIL). It is part of the Canyon Independent School District located in north central Randall County. In 2015, the school was rated "Met Standard" by the Texas Education Agency.

== Athletics ==
The Canyon Eagles compete in these sports -

Cross Country, Volleyball, Football, Basketball, Powerlifting, Swimming, Soccer, Wrestling, Golf, Tennis, Track, Softball and Baseball

=== State titles ===
- Boys Basketball -
  - 1950(1A), 1964(2A)
- Girls Basketball -
  - 1969(3A), 1972(3A), 1974(3A), 1977(3A), 1978(3A), 1981(4A), 1992(3A), 1996(4A), 2000(4A), 2003(3A), 2004(3A), 2005(3A), 2007(3A), 2008(3A), 2011(4A), 2014(4A), 2015(5A), 2016(5A), 2017(5A), 2021(4A)
- Boys Cross Country -
  - 1987(4A), 1993(3A), 1994(4A), 1995(4A), 2022(4A), 2023(4A), 2024(4A), 2025(4A)
- Girls Cross Country -
  - 1989(3A), 1990(3A), 1991(3A), 1992(3A), 1993(3A), 2003(3A), 2004(3A), 2006(3A), 2018(4A), 2019(4A), 2024(4A), 2025(4A), 2026(4A)
- Boys Track
  - 2026(4A)
- Girls Track -
  - 1976(3A), 1977(3A), 1978(3A), 2005(3A)
- Team Tennis -
  - 1991(3A), 1992(3A), 2007(
- One Act Play -
  - 1964(2A)

== Notable alumni ==
- Cody Campbell, energy investor and former college and pro football player
- Jake Rogers, MLB catcher with multiple teams.
