= Tee Pee City, Texas =

- Ghost town
- Location within Texas
- Coordinates: 34°0′17.77″N 100°38′22.58″W
- Country: United States
- State: Texas
- County: Motley
- Settled: 1875
- Founder: Buffalo hide traders
- Elevation: 2,165 ft (660 m)
- Time zone: UTC-6 (CST)

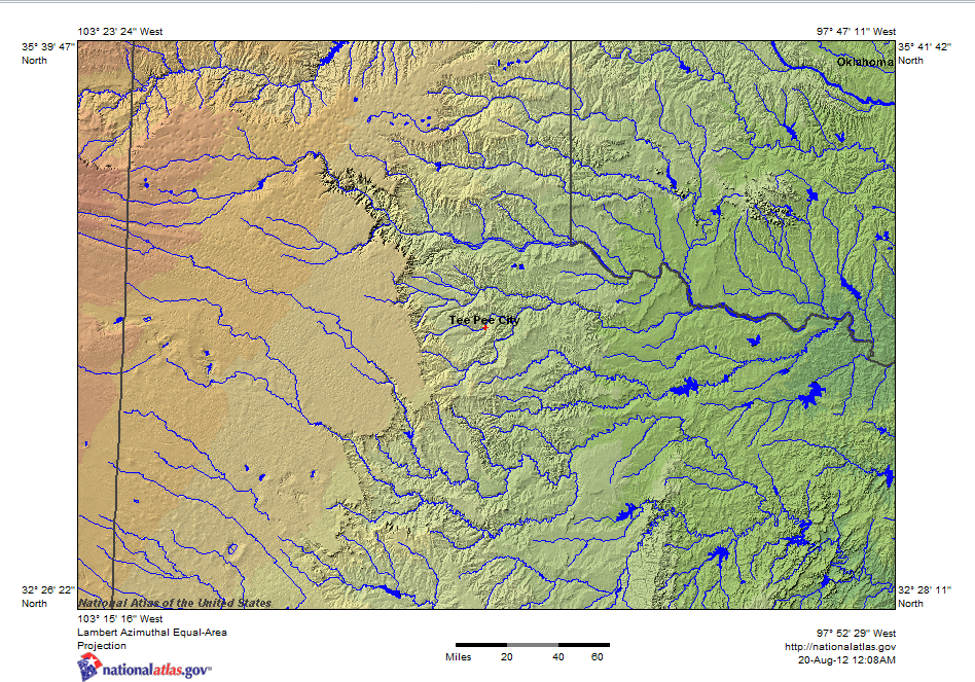
Shaded relief map of Tee Pee City, Texas in east Motley county

Tee Pee City is a ghost town located in eastern Motley County near Matador, Texas. The ghost town is near the confluence of Tee Pee Creek and the Middle Pease River in eastern Motley County. The site, originally a Comanche campground, derived its name from the numerous teepee poles found up and down the creek by early settlers.

== Early settlement ==
The Tee Pee City settlement was established in 1875 as a trading post serving buffalo hunters and surveying parties. Charles Rath and Lee Reynolds moved wagons, cattle, mules, and dance-hall equipment from Dodge City to establish the post, but soon moved on to the Double Mountain Fork Brazos River, leaving their hide-dealer representatives Armstrong and Sharp in charge. Until his death in 1884, Isaac Armstrong served as proprietor of the two-room picket building, which had a hotel in one room and a saloon complete with dance-hall girls in the other. Armstrong was buried on a nearby sandhill. By 1878, the buffalo herds, victims of the Sharps buffalo rifle, were gone from the area, and the buffalo hunters with them. The families of R. V. Fields and A. B. Cooper settled in Tee Pee City in 1879. Cooper freighted supplies from Dallas and ran the general store, first from a dugout and later from a one-room rock house. The post office was established in 1879 with Cooper as postmaster; it was abandoned in 1900. The Tee Pee City school, one of the first schools in the area, met from 1895 until 1902, when most of the settlers, save for the Cooper family, had left. The wide-open settlement, scene of shoot-outs, drunken brawls, and robberies, often warranted the attention of George W. Arrington's group of Texas Rangers based at Camp Roberts in Blanco Canyon.

The lawlessness of this town eventually led to its downfall, and then later to a ban of cowboys. The management of the Matador Land and Cattle Company considered Tee Pee City such a bad influence that the settlement was declared off-limits to its cowboys, and when the opportunity arose in 1904, the ranch bought the land and closed Tee Pee City down.

All that remained at the site in the 1980s was a 1936 Texas historical marker and the gravestones of Armstrong, two children (James Motley Cooper and Nellie Elizabeth Cooper), and their aunt, Mrs. A. S. Johnson.

== Historical record ==
Tee Pee City received a historic marker in 1936.

== See also ==
- List of ghost towns in Texas
- Whiteflat, Texas
- Llano Estacado
