= Flomot, Texas =

Unincorporated community in Texas, US

Flomot is an unincorporated community in Motley County, Texas, United States. According to the Handbook of Texas, the community had an estimated population of 181 in 2000.

== Geography ==
Flomot is located at 34°13′37″N 100°59′21″W (34.2270137, -100.9890346). It is situated at the junction of Farm Roads 97 and 599 in northeastern Motley County, between the North Pease River and Quitaque Creek. The community lies approximately 14 miles (23 km) south of Quitaque and 106 miles (171 km) southeast of Amarillo.

== History ==
The name is a portmanteau of two counties, Floyd and Motley, as the original post office – built in 1902 – was located on the county line. By that time, a school and store had already been established at the site. In 1915, the post office was moved to the residence of W.R. Welch. By the mid-1930s, Flomot had two cotton gins, two grocery stores, several restaurants and a service station. The population peaked at around 200 in 1940. Thereafter, the community began losing businesses and residents to larger cities. The number of inhabitants had declined to 181 by 1980 and remained at that level to 2000.

Flomot had a post office which closed on October 31, 2017. Flomot’s ZIP code remains 79234.

Flomot is the hometown of the American football star Thayne "Red" Amonett, "The Flomot Flash". He was recruited by the coach Pete Cawthon and joined the Texas Tech Red Raiders in 1940. After returning from World War II, he joined Cawthon and the Detroit Lions.

== Education ==
Public education in the community of Flomot is provided by the Motley County Independent School District.

== Climate ==
According to the Köppen Climate Classification system, Flomot has a semi-arid climate, abbreviated "BSk" on climate maps.

== See also ==
- Whiteflat, Texas
- Llano Estacado
