= Whiteflat, Texas =

- Ghost town
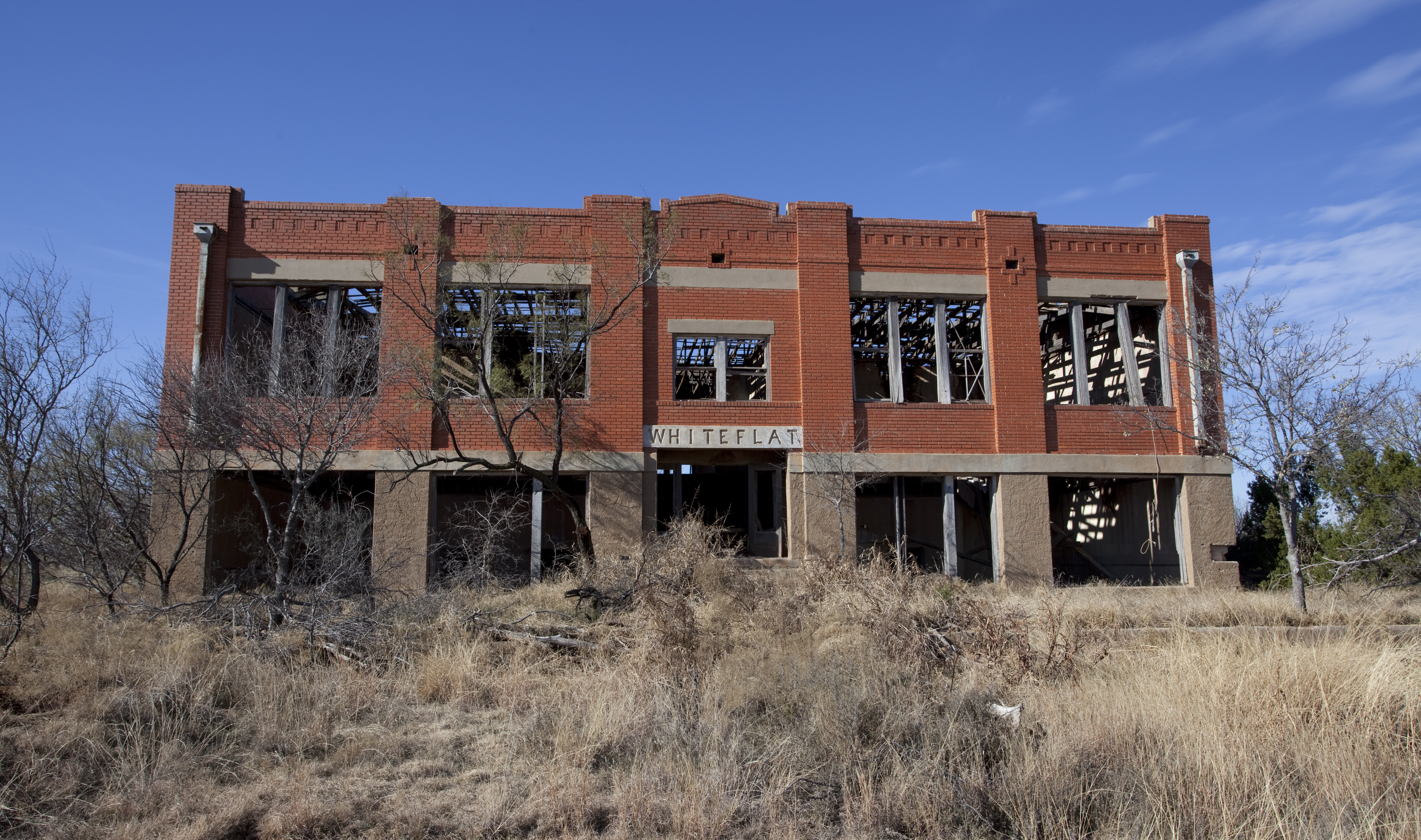
- Abandoned Whiteflat School

- Location of Whiteflat in Texas
- Coordinates: 34°06′19″N 100°53′22″W
- Country: United States
- State: Texas
- County: Motley
- Region: South Plains
- Established: 1890
- Elevation: 2,411 ft (735 m)

Population (2000)
  - Total: 3
- Time zone: UTC-6 (CST)
- Area code: 806
- Website: Whiteflat from the Handbook of Texas Online

Whiteflat is a ghost town in Motley County, Texas, United States. The population was estimated to be 3 at the 2000 census.

== History ==
Originally a line camp on the Matador Ranch, this section of Motley County was called "Whiteflat" after the white needlegrass which covered the flat prairie. A post office was established at Whiteflat in 1890 and a one-room school opened the same year. This small schoolhouse was replaced in 1908 by a four-room structure. In 1922, a two-story brick building (see photo) was erected for the Whiteflat School, which also served as the community-gathering place. Whiteflat declined during the Great Depression and the Dust Bowl of the 1930s. The school closed in 1946 and was consolidated with the Motley County Independent School District in Matador, 11 miles (18 km) to the south. The churches disbanded in the 1960s and the post office closed in 1966 upon the death of the last postmistress, Ida Morriss. The remaining retail business, a combined grocery store and service station, closed in 1968. In 2000, the population was estimated to be three.

== Geography ==
Whiteflat is located on an elevated flat spot between the Middle Pease River and Tom Ball Creek. It is located in the physiographic region known as the "Rolling Plains" about 12 miles (19 km) east of the Caprock Escarpment of the Llano Estacado.

== Education ==
Whiteflat is served by the Motley County Independent School District in Matador, Texas. The Motley County Independent School District has one school, Motley County School that serves students in grades pre-kindergarten though twelve. The district serves all of Motley County with the exception of a small portion in the north, which is served by the Turkey-Quitaque Independent School District.

== See also ==
- Pease River
- Llano Estacado
