= Roaring Springs, Texas =

Town in Motley County, Texas, United States

- Town
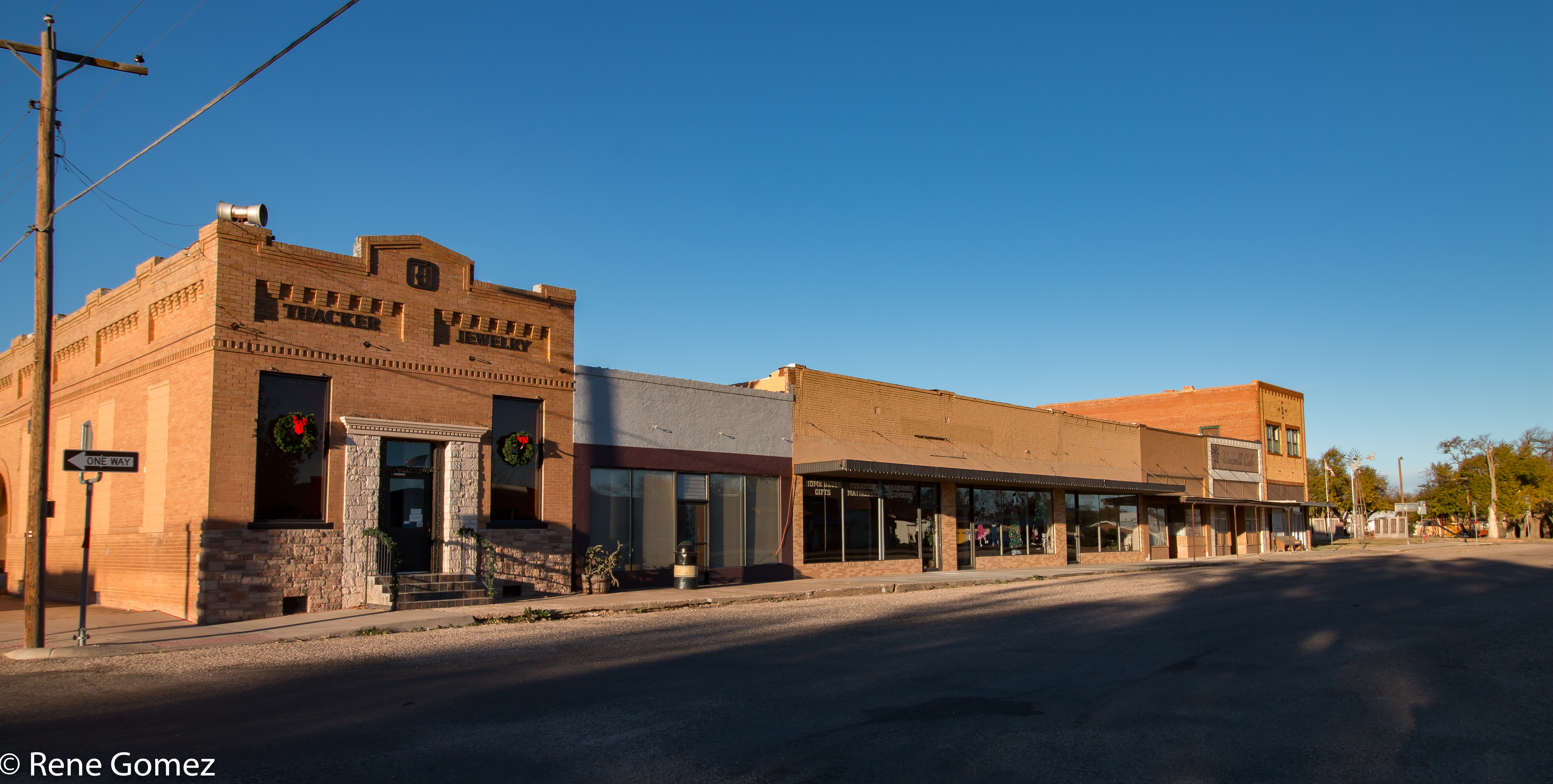
- Downtown Roaring Springs, November 2016

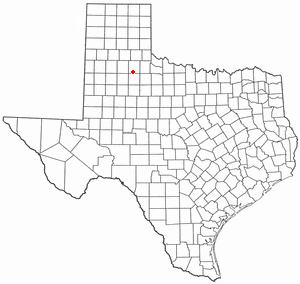
- Location of Roaring Springs, Texas

- Coordinates: 33°54′3″N 100°51′28″W
- Country: United States
- State: Texas
- County: Motley

Area
  - Total: 1.06 sq mi (2.75 km^{2})
  - Land: 1.06 sq mi (2.75 km^{2})
  - Water: 0 sq mi (0.00 km^{2})
- Elevation: 2,507 ft (764 m)

Population (2020)
  - Total: 217
  - Density: 204/sq mi (78.9/km^{2})
- Time zone: UTC-6 (Central (CST))
  - Summer (DST): UTC-5 (CDT)
- ZIP code: 79256
- Area code: 806
- FIPS code: 48-62528
- GNIS feature ID: 1366557

Roaring Springs is a town in Motley County, Texas, United States. The population was 217 at the 2020 census.

Roaring Springs was originally an Indian campground. At the time of the recapture of Cynthia Ann Parker in Foard County, Roaring Springs was the main Comanche outpost. It was known for the purity of its water. In 1912, the community was laid out in the anticipation of service from the Quanah, Acme and Pacific Railway, operated by Samuel Lazarus (1855–1926). The name "Roaring Springs" was adopted in 1913, when the railroad initiated service. A brick depot was soon established at the end of Broadway Street and handled passenger and freight traffic until 1971. The next year the depot was purchased by the town.

== Geography ==
Roaring Springs is located at 33°54′3″N 100°51′28″W (33.900716, –100.857640).

According to the United States Census Bureau, the town has a total area of 1.1 square miles (2.8 km^{2}), all of it land.

== Demographics ==
=== 2020 census ===
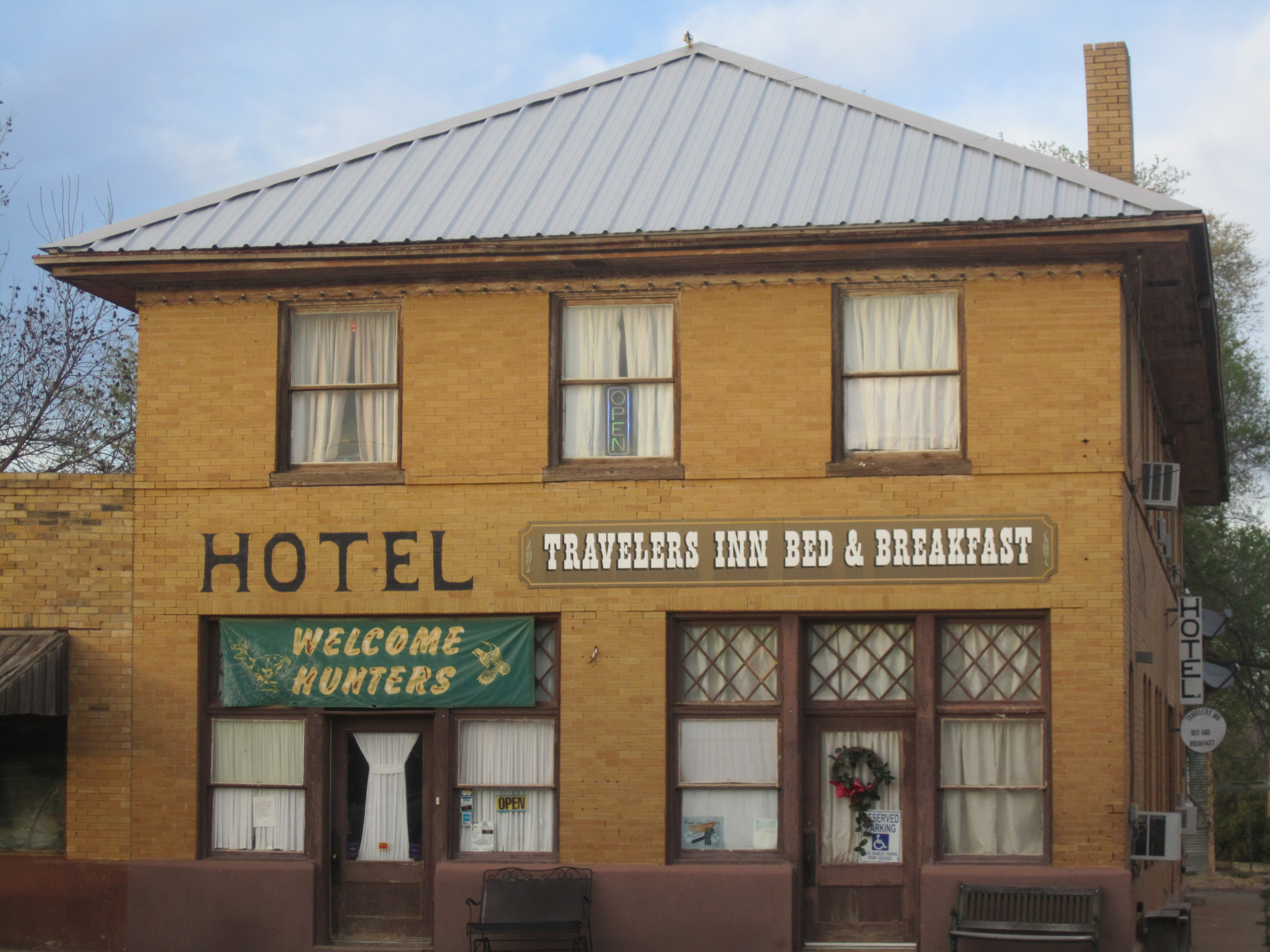
Travelers Inn Bed and Breakfast, March 2011

Roaring Springs racial composition (NH = Non-Hispanic) (Note: Note: the US Census treats Hispanic/Latino as an ethnic category. This table excludes Latinos from the racial categories and assigns them to a separate category. Hispanics/Latinos can be of any race.)
Race	Number	Percentage
White (NH)	190	87.56%
Some Other Race (NH)	1	0.46%
Mixed/Multi-Racial (NH)	11	5.07%
Hispanic or Latino	15	6.91%
Total	217	

As of the 2020 United States census, there were 217 people, 108 households, and 58 families residing in the town.

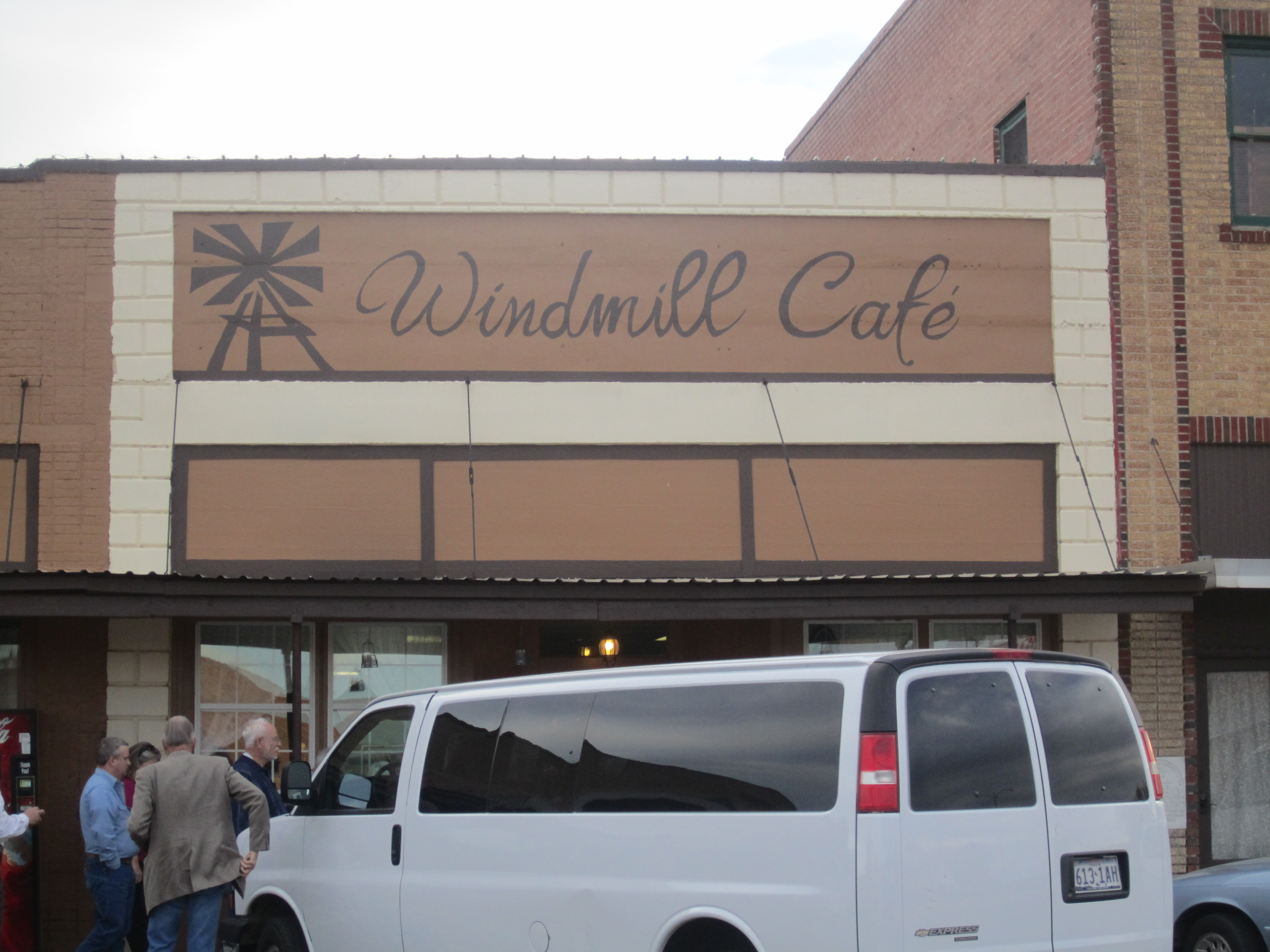
Windmill Cafe in Roaring Springs, March 2011

=== 2000 census ===
Historical population
Census	Pop.	Note	%±
1930	405		—
1940	514		26.9%
1950	435		−15.4%
1960	398		−8.5%
1970	308		−22.6%
1980	315		2.3%
1990	264		−16.2%
2000	265		0.4%
2010	234		−11.7%
2020	217		−7.3%
U.S. Decennial Census

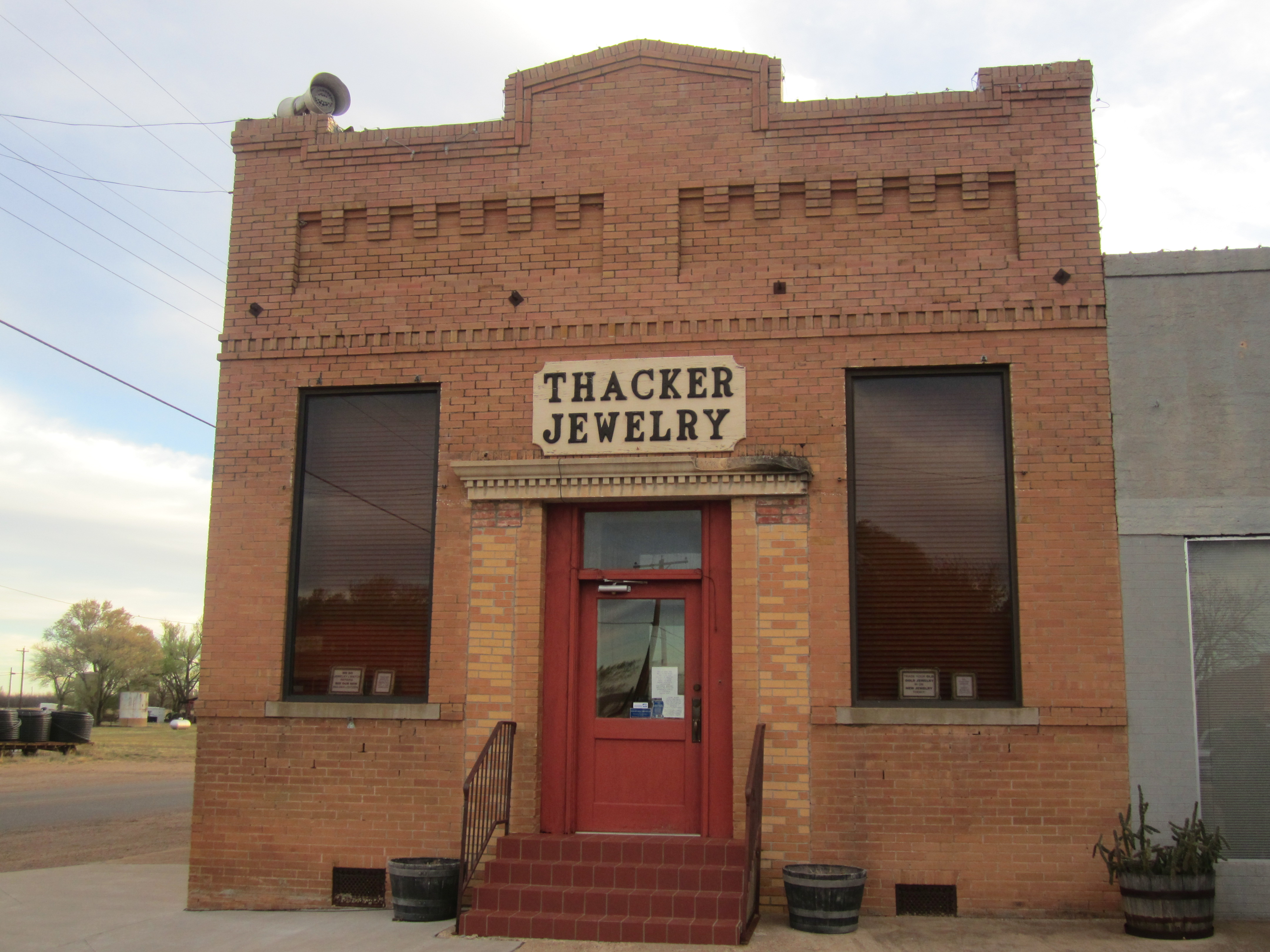
The Thacker Jewelry Company in Roaring Springs is a manufacturing and retail outlet still in production. There is also a larger Thacker's store in Lubbock.

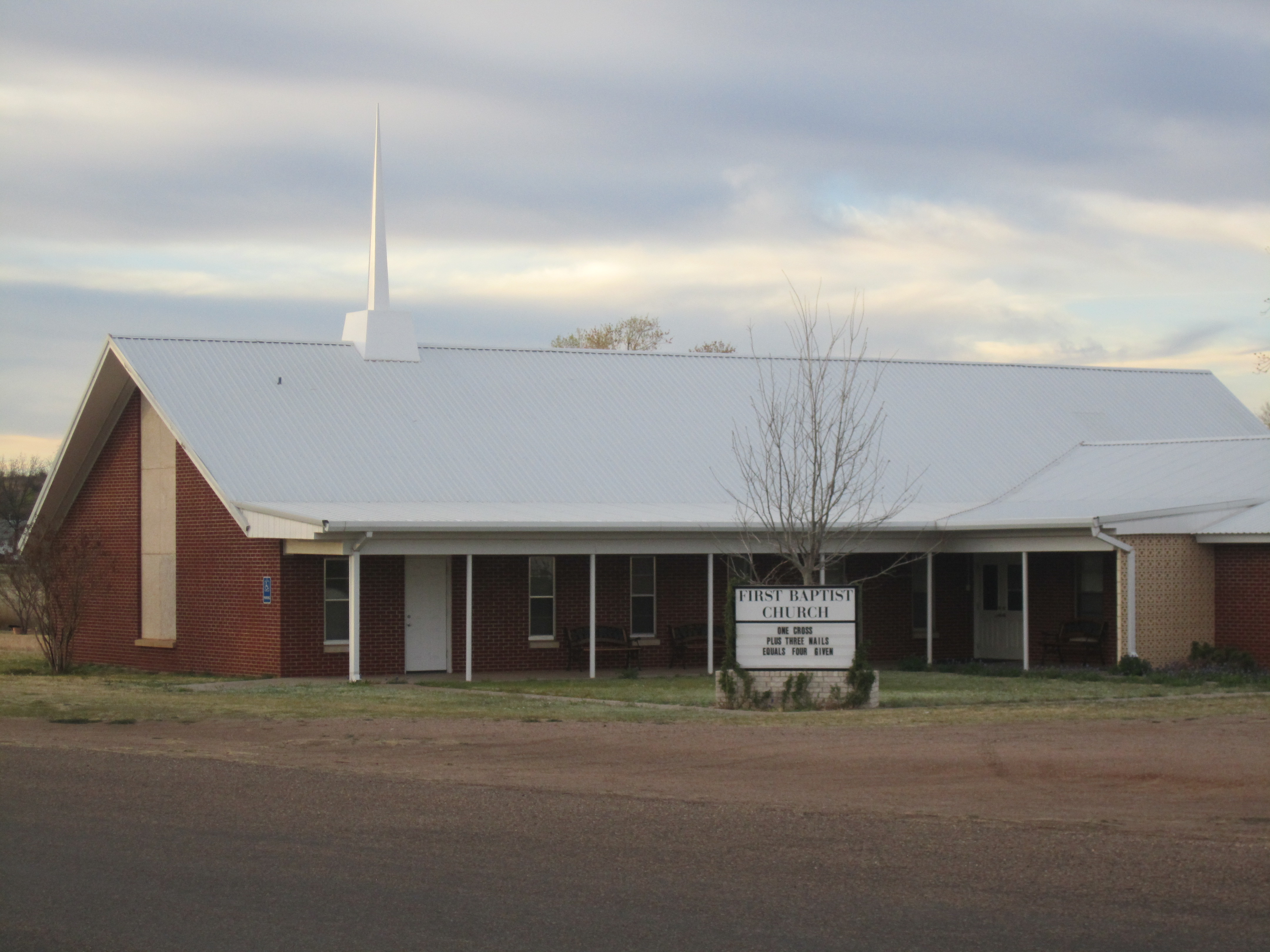
First Baptist Church of Roaring Springs, March 2011

As of the census of 2000, there were 265 people, 117 households, and 82 families residing in the town. The population density was 248.4 inhabitants per square mile (95.9/km^{2}). There were 145 housing units at an average density of 135.9 per square mile (52.5/km^{2}). The racial makeup of the town was 91.70% White, 1.51% African American, 6.04% from other races, and 0.75% from two or more races. Hispanic or Latino of any race were 8.30% of the population.

There were 117 households, out of which 24.8% had children under the age of 18 living with them, 54.7% were married couples living together, 11.1% had a female householder with no husband present, and 29.9% were non-families. 25.6% of all households were made up of individuals, and 15.4% had someone living alone who was 65 years of age or older. The average household size was 2.26 and the average family size was 2.68.

In the town, the population was spread out, with 23.0% under the age of 18, 4.5% from 18 to 24, 22.3% from 25 to 44, 23.8% from 45 to 64, and 26.4% who were 65 years of age or older. The median age was 45 years. For every 100 females, there were 103.8 males. For every 100 females age 18 and over, there were 98.1 males.

The median income for a household in the town was $26,250, and the median income for a family was $30,625. Males had a median income of $25,625 versus $16,750 for females. The per capita income for the town was $14,901. About 9.3% of families and 18.1% of the population were below the poverty line, including 34.7% of those under the age of eighteen and 10.8% of those 65 or over.

== Education ==
The Town of Roaring Springs is served by the Motley County Independent School District.

Motley County is in the service area of South Plains College.

== See also ==
- List of municipalities in Texas
