= Valley School (Turkey, Texas) =

Location
- 11826 Highway 86; Turkey, Texas 79261-0397; United States; 34.371645°N 100.984665°W

Information
- School type: Public K-12 school
- School district: Turkey-Quitaque Independent School District
- Superintendent: Jackie Jenkins
- Principal: Brandon Smith
- Staff: 21.39 (FTE)
- Grades: PK-12
- Enrollment: 221 (2018–19)
- Student to teacher ratio: 10.33
- Colors: Red, White & Blue
- Athletics conference: UIL Class A
- Mascot: Patriot
- Website: Valley High School

Valley School is a public K-12 school located west of Turkey, Texas (USA). It is part of the Turkey-Quitaque Independent School District that covers eastern Briscoe County and western Hall County as well as portions of other counties.

The school was formed by the consolidation of Turkey and Quitaque high schools in 1972.

In 2011, the school was rated "Recognized" by the Texas Education Agency.

== Athletics ==
Its high school athletic teams are classified as 1A by the University Interscholastic League.

The Valley Patriots compete in the following sports:

- Baseball
- Basketball
- Cross Country
- 6-Man Football

=== State Titles ===
- Boys Basketball
  - 2026(1A/D1)

==== State Finalists ====
- Girls Basketball -
  - 1973(1A), 2024(1A)
- Football -
  - 2004(6M), 2005(6M)
