= Motley County School =

Location
- 1600 Bundy Street; Matador, Texas 79244-0310; United States; 34.007793°N 100.823372°W

Information
- School type: Public K-12 school
- School district: Motley County Independent School District
- Principal: Tim Hill
- Staff: 16.48 (on an FTE basis)
- Grades: PK-12
- Enrollment: 160 (2023–2024)
- Student to teacher ratio: 9.71
- Colors: Red, black & white
- Athletics conference: UIL Class A
- Mascot: Matador
- Website: Motley County High School

Motley County School is a K-12 public school located in Matador, Texas (USA). It is part of the Motley County Independent School District located in central Motley County.

Its high school athletics teams are classified as 1A by the University Interscholastic League.

In 2019, the school was given an Accountability Rating of 'A' by the Texas Education Agency with distinction designations in ELA/Reading, Social Studies, Comparative Academic Growth, Postsecondary Readiness, and Comparative Closing the Gaps.

== Athletics ==
The Motley County Matadors compete in the following sports:

- Basketball
- Cross Country
- 6-Man Football
- Golf
- Tennis

=== State titles ===
- Football
  - 2007(6M/D2)

=== State finalists ===
- Football
  - 2011(6M/D2)
  - 2019(6M/D2)
  - 2021(6M/D2)
