= Motley County, Texas =

County in Texas, United States

- County
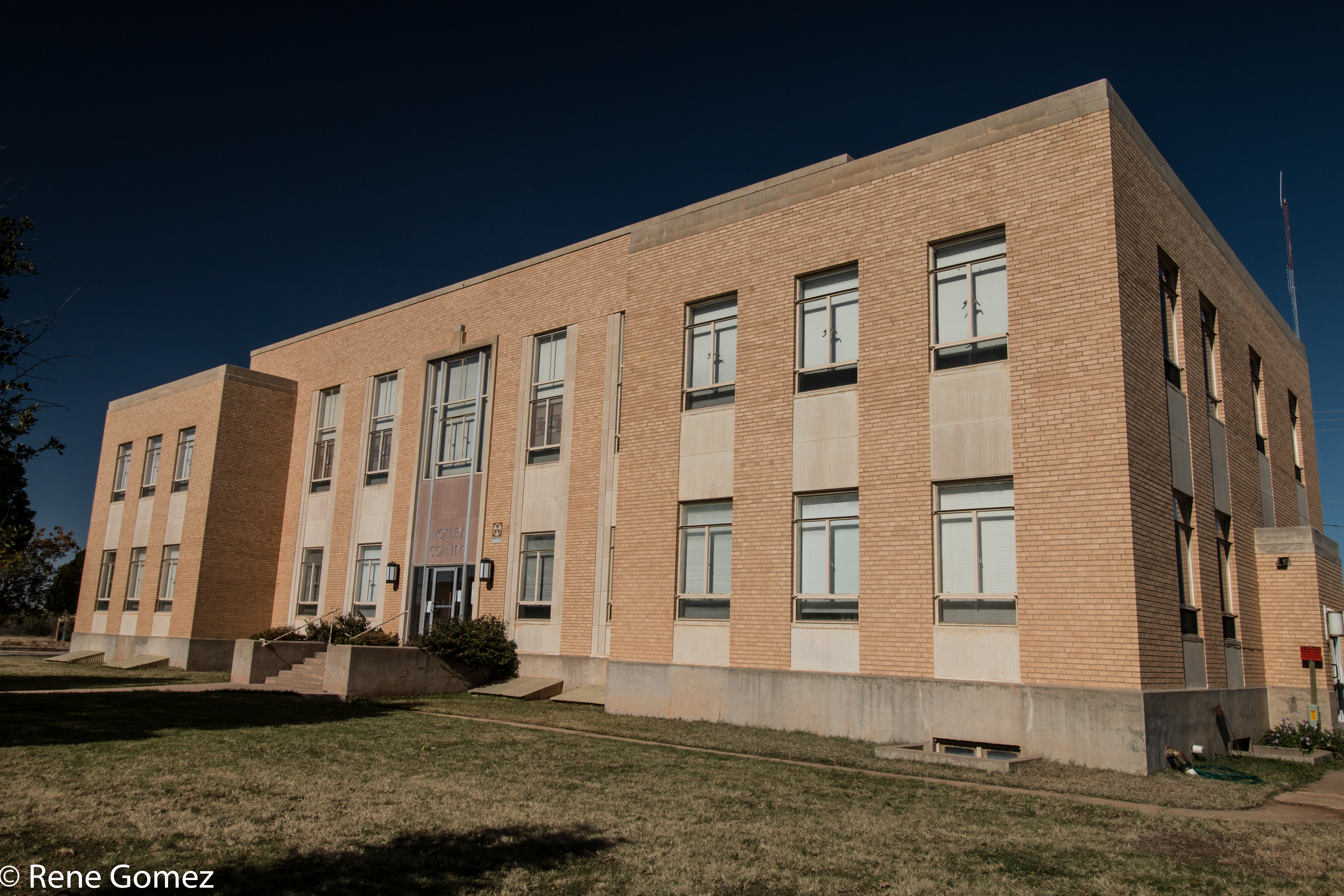
- Motley County Courthouse in Matador

- Location within the U.S. state of Texas
- Coordinates: 34°05′N 100°47′W
- Country: United States
- State: Texas
- Founded: 1891
- Named for: Junius William Mottley
- Seat: Matador
- Largest town: Matador

Area
  - Total: 990 sq mi (2,600 km^{2})
  - Land: 990 sq mi (2,600 km^{2})
  - Water: 0.2 sq mi (0.52 km^{2}) 0.03%

Population (2020)
  - Total: 1,063
  - Estimate (2025): 1,043 ▼
  - Density: 1.1/sq mi (0.41/km^{2})
- Time zone: UTC−6 (Central)
  - Summer (DST): UTC−5 (CDT)
- Congressional district: 13th
- Website: www.co.motley.tx.us

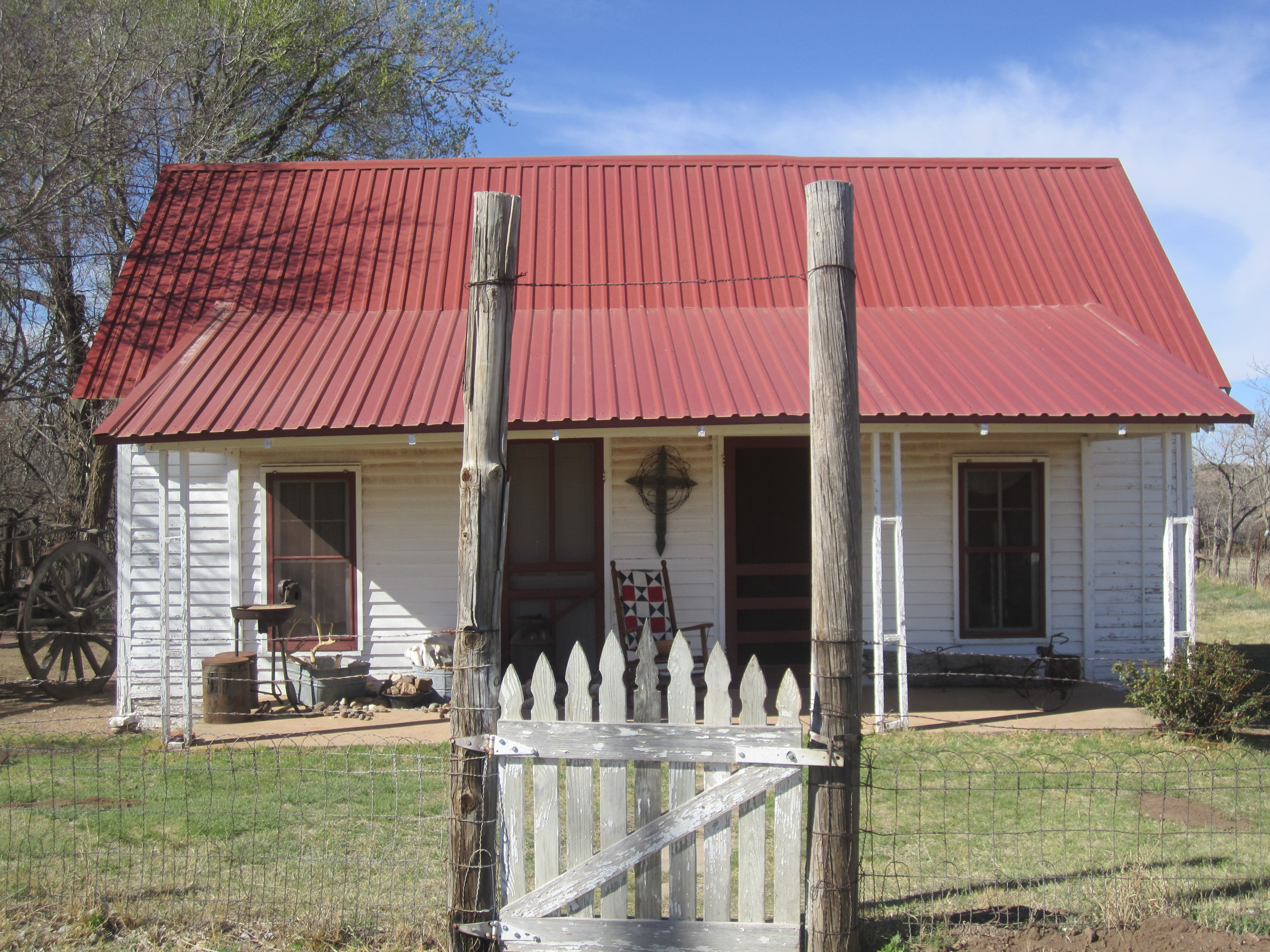
Early Matador Ranch main building in Motley County

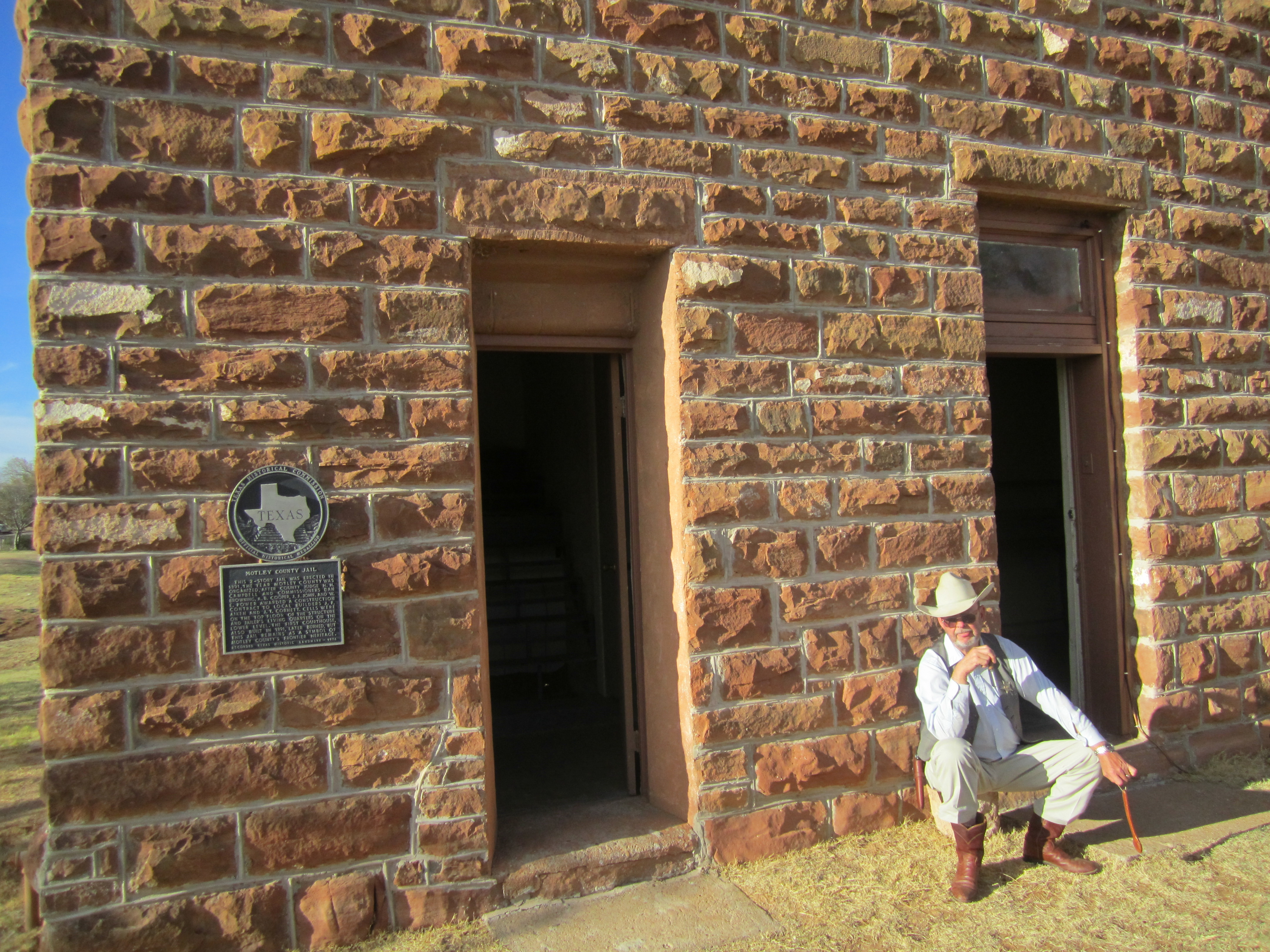
Work is proceeding in 2011 on the restoration of the old Matador jail. Pictured is former Motley County Judge Ed D. Smith.

Motley County is a county located in the U.S. state of Texas. As of the 2020 census, its population was 1,063, making it the 10th-least populous county in Texas. Its county seat is Matador. The county was created in 1876 and organized in 1891. It is named for Junius William Mottley, a signer of the Texas Declaration of Independence. Mottley's name is spelled incorrectly because the bill establishing the county misspelled his name. Motley County was one of 30 prohibition, or entirely dry, counties in Texas, but is now a wet county.

== Geography ==
According to the U.S. Census Bureau, the county has a total area of 990 sq mi (2,600 km^{2}), of which 990 sq mi (2,600 km^{2}) are land and 0.2 sq mi (0.52 km^{2}) (0.03%) is covered by water.

=== Major highways ===
- U.S. Highway 62/U.S. Highway 70
- State Highway 70
- Loop 42
- Spur 196

=== Adjacent counties ===
- Hall County (north)
- Cottle County (east)
- Dickens County (south)
- Floyd County (west)
- Briscoe County (northwest)
- King County (northwest)

== Demographics ==
Historical population
Census	Pop.	Note	%±
1880	24		—
1890	139		479.2%
1900	1,257		804.3%
1910	2,396		90.6%
1920	4,107		71.4%
1930	6,812		65.9%
1940	4,994		−26.7%
1950	3,963		−20.6%
1960	2,870		−27.6%
1970	2,178		−24.1%
1980	1,950		−10.5%
1990	1,532		−21.4%
2000	1,426		−6.9%
2010	1,210		−15.1%
2020	1,063		−12.1%
2025 (est.)	1,043	▼	−1.9%
U.S. Decennial Census; 1850–2010 2010 2020

Motley County, Texas – Racial and ethnic composition Note: the US Census treats Hispanic/Latino as an ethnic category. This table excludes Latinos from the racial categories and assigns them to a separate category. Hispanics/Latinos may be of any race.
Race / Ethnicity (NH = Non-Hispanic)	Pop 2000	Pop 2010	Pop 2020	% 2000	% 2010	% 2020
White alone (NH)	1,172	1,013	858	82.19%	83.72%	80.71%
Black or African American alone (NH)	50	24	7	3.51%	1.98%	0.66%
Native American or Alaska Native alone (NH)	6	8	0	0.42%	0.66%	0.00%
Asian alone (NH)	2	0	0	0.14%	0.00%	0.00%
Native Hawaiian or Pacific Islander alone (NH)	2	0	0	0.14%	0.00%	0.00%
Other race alone (NH)	0	0	2	0.00%	0.00%	0.19%
Multiracial (NH)	21	2	43	1.47%	0.17%	4.05%
Hispanic or Latino (any race)	173	163	153	12.13%	13.47%	14.39%
Total	1,426	1,210	1,063	100.00%	100.00%	100.00%

=== 2020 census ===
As of the 2020 census, the county had a population of 1,063 and a median age of 49.2 years. 20.9% of residents were under the age of 18, and 30.2% were 65 years of age or older. For every 100 females there were 98.0 males, while for every 100 females age 18 and over there were 97.4 males.

The racial makeup of the county was 87.6% White, 0.9% Black or African American, 0.2% American Indian and Alaska Native, <0.1% Asian, <0.1% Native Hawaiian and Pacific Islander, 4.0% from some other race, and 7.2% from two or more races. Hispanic or Latino residents of any race comprised 14.4% of the population.

<0.1% of residents lived in urban areas, while 100.0% lived in rural areas.

There were 472 households in the county, of which 27.5% had children under the age of 18. Of all households, 49.8% were married-couple households, 19.3% were households with a male householder and no spouse or partner present, and 26.1% were households with a female householder and no spouse or partner present. About 30.7% of all households were made up of individuals and 18.7% had someone living alone who was 65 years of age or older.

There were 703 housing units, of which 32.9% were vacant. Among occupied housing units, 73.3% were owner-occupied and 26.7% were renter-occupied, with a homeowner vacancy rate of 2.3% and a rental vacancy rate of 11.0%.

=== 2000 census ===
As of the 2000 census, 1,426 people, 606 households, and 435 families were residing in the county. The population density was 1 person/mi^{2} (0.39 person/km^{2}). The 839 housing units averaged 1 per square mile (0.39/km^{2}). The racial makeup of the county was 87.38% White, 3.51% African American, 0.63% Native American, 0.14% Asian, 0.14% Pacific Islander, 6.31% from other races, and 1.89% from two or more races. About 12.13% of the population were Hispanics or Latinos of any race.

Of the 606 households, 26.60% had children under 18 living with them, 60.20% were married couples living together, 8.70% had a female householder with no husband present, and 28.20% were not families. About 25.70% of all households were made up of individuals, and 15.30% had someone living alone who was 65 or older. The average household size was 2.35 and the average family size was 2.82.

In the county, the age distribution was 24.00% under 18, 6.00% from 18 to 24, 21.10% from 25 to 44, 25.20% from 45 to 64, and 23.70% who were 65 or older. The median age was 44 years. For every 100 females, there were 101.70 males. For every 100 females age 18 and over, there were 92.90 males.

The median income for a household in the county was $28,348, and for a family was $33,977. Males had a median income of $25,395 versus $13,333 for females. The per capita income for the county was $16,584. About 13.90% of families and 19.40% of the population were below the poverty line, including 35.30% of those under age 18 and 13.80% of those age 65 or over.

== Communities ==
=== Towns ===
- Matador (county seat)
- Roaring Springs

=== Unincorporated community ===
- Flomot

=== Ghost towns ===
- Tee Pee City
- Whiteflat

== Politics ==
Motley County is located within District 69 of the Texas House of Representatives. Motley County is located within District 28 of the Texas Senate.

United States presidential election results for Motley County, Texas
Year	Republican		Democratic		Third party(ies)	
Year	No.	%	No.	%	No.	%
1912	8	3.25%	193	78.46%	45	18.29%
1916	9	2.09%	393	91.40%	28	6.51%
1920	40	10.23%	345	88.24%	6	1.53%
1924	62	11.81%	453	86.29%	10	1.90%
1928	450	56.32%	349	43.68%	0	0.00%
1932	34	3.63%	900	96.15%	2	0.21%
1936	64	6.86%	867	92.93%	2	0.21%
1940	100	9.93%	907	90.07%	0	0.00%
1944	107	11.44%	744	79.57%	84	8.98%
1948	75	8.32%	774	85.90%	52	5.77%
1952	675	56.72%	513	43.11%	2	0.17%
1956	411	44.38%	511	55.18%	4	0.43%
1960	480	51.50%	439	47.10%	13	1.39%
1964	324	32.27%	678	67.53%	2	0.20%
1968	415	37.49%	397	35.86%	295	26.65%
1972	657	72.52%	230	25.39%	19	2.10%
1976	428	44.54%	522	54.32%	11	1.14%
1980	573	61.68%	341	36.71%	15	1.61%
1984	533	65.08%	282	34.43%	4	0.49%
1988	429	61.99%	262	37.86%	1	0.14%
1992	446	54.46%	256	31.26%	117	14.29%
1996	380	62.81%	164	27.11%	61	10.08%
2000	514	80.06%	118	18.38%	10	1.56%
2004	564	82.46%	113	16.52%	7	1.02%
2008	522	87.88%	67	11.28%	5	0.84%
2012	538	89.67%	55	9.17%	7	1.17%
2016	566	92.03%	40	6.50%	9	1.46%
2020	604	92.64%	46	7.06%	2	0.31%
2024	612	94.15%	35	5.38%	3	0.46%

United States Senate election results for Motley County, Texas1
Year	Republican		Democratic		Third party(ies)	
Year	No.	%	No.	%	No.	%
2024	592	92.21%	41	6.39%	9	1.40%

United States Senate election results for Motley County, Texas2
Year	Republican		Democratic		Third party(ies)	
Year	No.	%	No.	%	No.	%
2020	591	92.63%	44	6.90%	3	0.47%

Texas Gubernatorial election results for Motley County
Year	Republican		Democratic		Third party(ies)	
Year	No.	%	No.	%	No.	%
2022	482	95.63%	18	3.57%	4	0.79%

== Education ==
School districts serving the county include:

- Motley County Independent School District
- Turkey-Quitaque Independent School District

The county is in the service area of South Plains College.

== See also ==
- Quitaque Creek
- National Register of Historic Places listings in Motley County, Texas
- Recorded Texas Historic Landmarks in Motley County
