= Turkey-Quitaque Independent School District =

School district in Texas

Turkey-Quitaque Independent School District is a public school district based in Turkey, Texas, United States. Located mostly in Hall County, the district extends into portions of Briscoe, Floyd, and Motley Counties, and serves the communities of Turkey and Quitaque.

The district operates one school, Valley School. In 2011, the district was rated "Recognized" by the Texas Education Agency.
