= Motley County Independent School District =

School district in Texas

Coordinates: 34.0078°N 100.8237°W

Location
- Matador, TX ESC Region 17 USA

District information
- Type: Public
- Grades: Pre-K through 12
- Superintendent: William Cochran

Students and staff
- Athletic conference: UIL Class A (six-man football member)
- Colors: red, black and white

Other information
- Mascot: matador
- Website: Motley County ISD

Motley County Independent School District is a public school district based in Matador, Texas (USA). The district serves all of Motley County with the exception of a small portion in the north, which is served by the Turkey-Quitaque Independent School District. A small portion of northeastern Floyd County lies within the district.

The Motley County Independent School District has one school, Motley County School that serves students in grades pre-kindergarten though twelve.

In 2009, the school district was rated "academically acceptable" by the Texas Education Agency.
