= Matador, Texas =

- Town
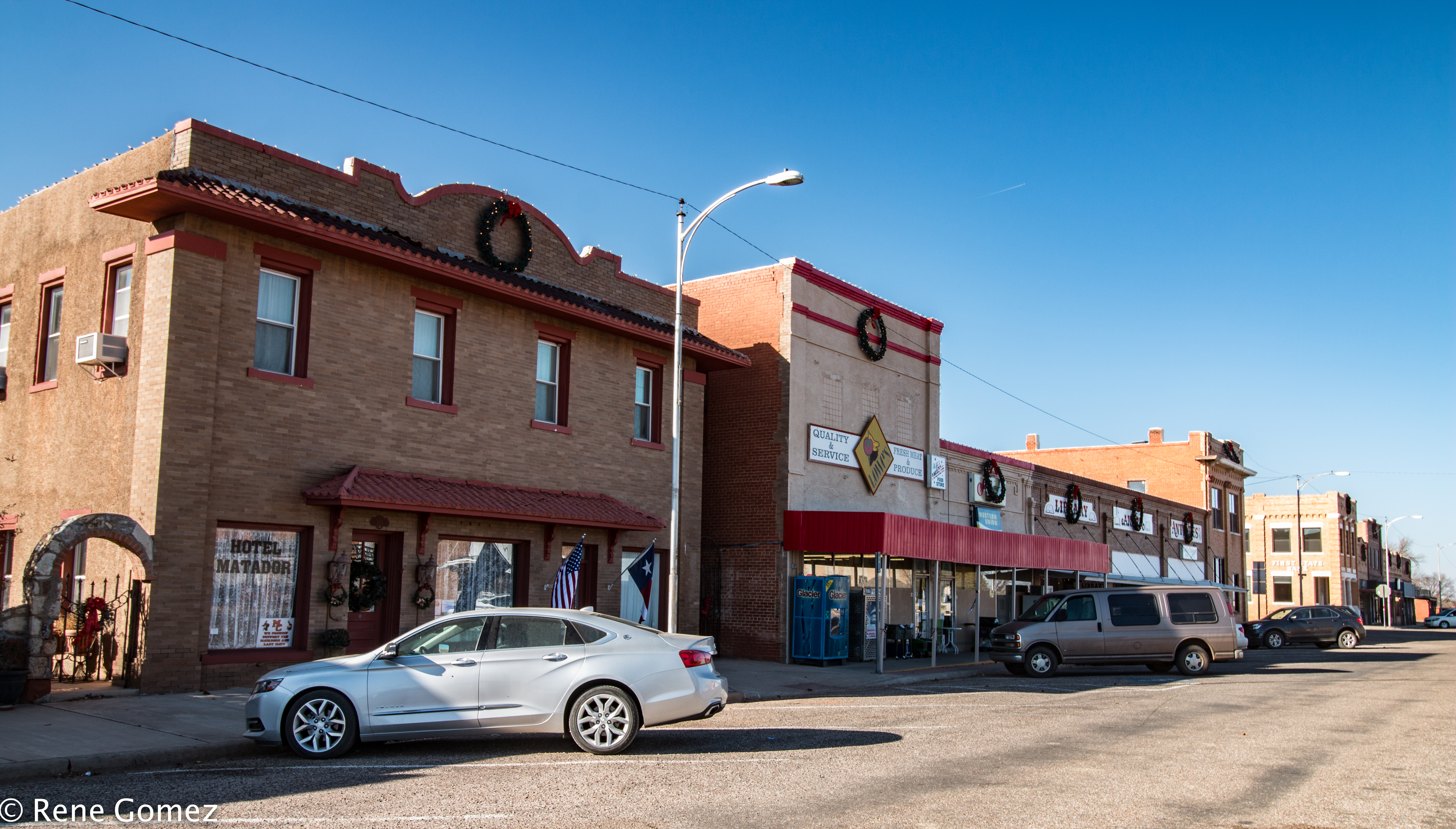

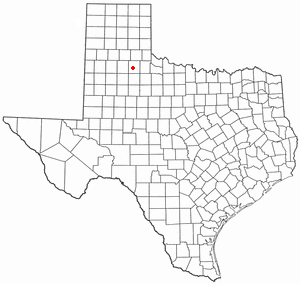
- Location of Matador, Texas

- Coordinates: 34°0′50″N 100°49′18″W
- Country: United States
- State: Texas
- County: Motley

Area
  - Total: 1.31 sq mi (3.38 km^{2})
  - Land: 1.31 sq mi (3.38 km^{2})
  - Water: 0 sq mi (0.00 km^{2})
- Elevation: 2,382 ft (726 m)

Population (2020)
  - Total: 569
  - Density: 436/sq mi (168/km^{2})
- Time zone: UTC-6 (Central (CST))
  - Summer (DST): UTC-5 (CDT)
- ZIP code: 79244
- Area code: 806
- FIPS code: 48-47004
- GNIS feature ID: 1362272
- Website: matadortx.gov

Matador is a town in and the county seat of Motley County, Texas, United States. Its population was 569 at the 2020 census. In 1891, it was established by and named for the Matador Ranch. It is located 95 miles (153 km) east of Lubbock, Texas.

== History ==
The Matador Ranch was consolidated in 1882 by a Scottish syndicate, and a post office opened at Matador in 1886.

At the end of the 19th century, townspeople freed the community from domination by the Matador Ranch, which was liquidated in 1951, by relocating nonranch families there and electing their own slate of officials.

The community was incorporated in 1912 and made the county seat. The state required that a town have at least 20 businesses. Local ranch hands hence established fraudulent, temporary businesses using ranch supplies. The only real business in Matador at the time was a saloon.

Its highest population, 1,376, was reached in 1940.

=== 2023 tornado ===
On June 21, 2023, the town was severely damaged by a powerful, high-end EF3 tornado, causing four deaths and ten injuries. At least 20 homes and business were destroyed on the western side of town.

== Geography ==
Matador is located at 34°0′50″N 100°49′18″W (34.013996, –100.821646).

According to the United States Census Bureau, the town has a total area of 1.3 square miles (3.4 km^{2}), all of it land.

Matador is at the junction on conjoined US Route 62, U.S. Route 70, and State Highway 70.

=== Climate ===
According to the Köppen climate classification, Matador has a semiarid climate, BSk on climate maps.

Climate data for Matador, Texas (1991–2020 normals, extremes 1947–present)
Month	Jan	Feb	Mar	Apr	May	Jun	Jul	Aug	Sep	Oct	Nov	Dec	Year
Record high °F (°C)	87 (31)	93 (34)	101 (38)	106 (41)	110 (43)	116 (47)	113 (45)	111 (44)	107 (42)	105 (41)	94 (34)	87 (31)	116 (47)
Mean daily maximum °F (°C)	53.7 (12.1)	57.5 (14.2)	66.3 (19.1)	74.4 (23.6)	82.3 (27.9)	90.1 (32.3)	93.4 (34.1)	92.3 (33.5)	84.5 (29.2)	74.9 (23.8)	63.3 (17.4)	54.4 (12.4)	73.9 (23.3)
Daily mean °F (°C)	41.1 (5.1)	43.9 (6.6)	52.1 (11.2)	60.0 (15.6)	69.1 (20.6)	77.5 (25.3)	81.2 (27.3)	80.0 (26.7)	72.2 (22.3)	61.8 (16.6)	50.4 (10.2)	42.2 (5.7)	61.0 (16.1)
Mean daily minimum °F (°C)	28.4 (−2.0)	30.3 (−0.9)	37.9 (3.3)	45.6 (7.6)	56.0 (13.3)	64.9 (18.3)	69.0 (20.6)	67.8 (19.9)	59.9 (15.5)	48.7 (9.3)	37.5 (3.1)	30.0 (−1.1)	48.0 (8.9)
Record low °F (°C)	−4 (−20)	−6 (−21)	3 (−16)	22 (−6)	32 (0)	46 (8)	54 (12)	52 (11)	37 (3)	18 (−8)	10 (−12)	−5 (−21)	−6 (−21)
Average precipitation inches (mm)	0.81 (21)	0.89 (23)	1.45 (37)	1.96 (50)	2.77 (70)	3.44 (87)	2.03 (52)	2.68 (68)	2.99 (76)	1.89 (48)	1.08 (27)	0.99 (25)	22.98 (584)
Average snowfall inches (cm)	1.4 (3.6)	1.7 (4.3)	0.3 (0.76)	0.1 (0.25)	0.0 (0.0)	0.0 (0.0)	0.0 (0.0)	0.0 (0.0)	0.0 (0.0)	0.1 (0.25)	0.9 (2.3)	2.0 (5.1)	6.5 (17)
Average precipitation days (≥ 0.01 in)	3.2	3.7	4.7	4.6	6.7	6.8	5.1	6.4	5.9	4.9	3.5	3.3	58.8
Average snowy days (≥ 0.1 in)	0.9	1.0	0.3	0.1	0.0	0.0	0.0	0.0	0.0	0.1	0.5	1.0	3.9
Source: NOAA

== Demographics ==
Historical population
Census	Pop.	Note	%±
1920	692		—
1930	1,302		88.2%
1940	1,376		5.7%
1950	1,335		−3.0%
1960	1,217		−8.8%
1970	1,091		−10.4%
1980	1,052		−3.6%
1990	790		−24.9%
2000	740		−6.3%
2010	607		−18.0%
2020	569		−6.3%
U.S. Decennial Census

=== 2020 census ===
Matador racial composition (NH = Non-Hispanic) (Note: Note: the US Census treats Hispanic/Latino as an ethnic category. This table excludes Latinos from the racial categories and assigns them to a separate category. Hispanics/Latinos can be of any race.)
Race	Number	Percentage
White (NH)	436	76.63%
Hispanic or Latino	100	17.57%
Black or African American (NH)	7	1.23%
Some Other Race (NH)	1	0.18%
Mixed/Multi-Racial (NH)	25	4.39%
Total	569	

As of the 2020 United States census, there were 569 people, 273 households, and 190 families residing in the town.

=== 2000 census ===
As of the census of 2000, 740 people, 308 households, and 222 families resided in the town. The population density was 569.5 people/sq mi (219.8/km^{2}). The 395 housing units averaged 304.0/sq mi (117.3/km^{2}). The racial makeup of the town was 83.92% White, 5.68% African American, 1.22% Native American, 0.27% Asian, 0.27% Pacific Islander, 6.76% from other races, and 1.89% from two or more races. Hispanics or Latinos of any race were 13.24% of the population.

Of the 308 households, 30.8% had children under 18 living with them, 58.1% were married couples living together, 11.0% had a female householder with no husband present, and 27.9% were not families; 25.6% of all households were made up of individuals, and 15.3% had someone living alone who was 65 or older. The average household size was 2.40 and the average family size was 2.88.

In the town, the population was distributed as 26.2% under 18, 6.6% from 18 to 24, 21.2% from 25 to 44, 25.0% from 45 to 64, and 20.9% who were 65 years of age or older. The median age was 43 years. For every 100 females, there were 97.3 males. For every 100 females age 18 and over, there were 88.3 males.

The median income for a household in the town was $27,778, and for a family was $32,054. Males had a median income of $26,042 versus $12,639 for females. The per capita income for the town was $17,001. About 16.3% of families and 19.7% of the population were below the poverty line, including 35.4% of those under age 18 and 16.9% of those age 65 or over.

== Area attractions ==
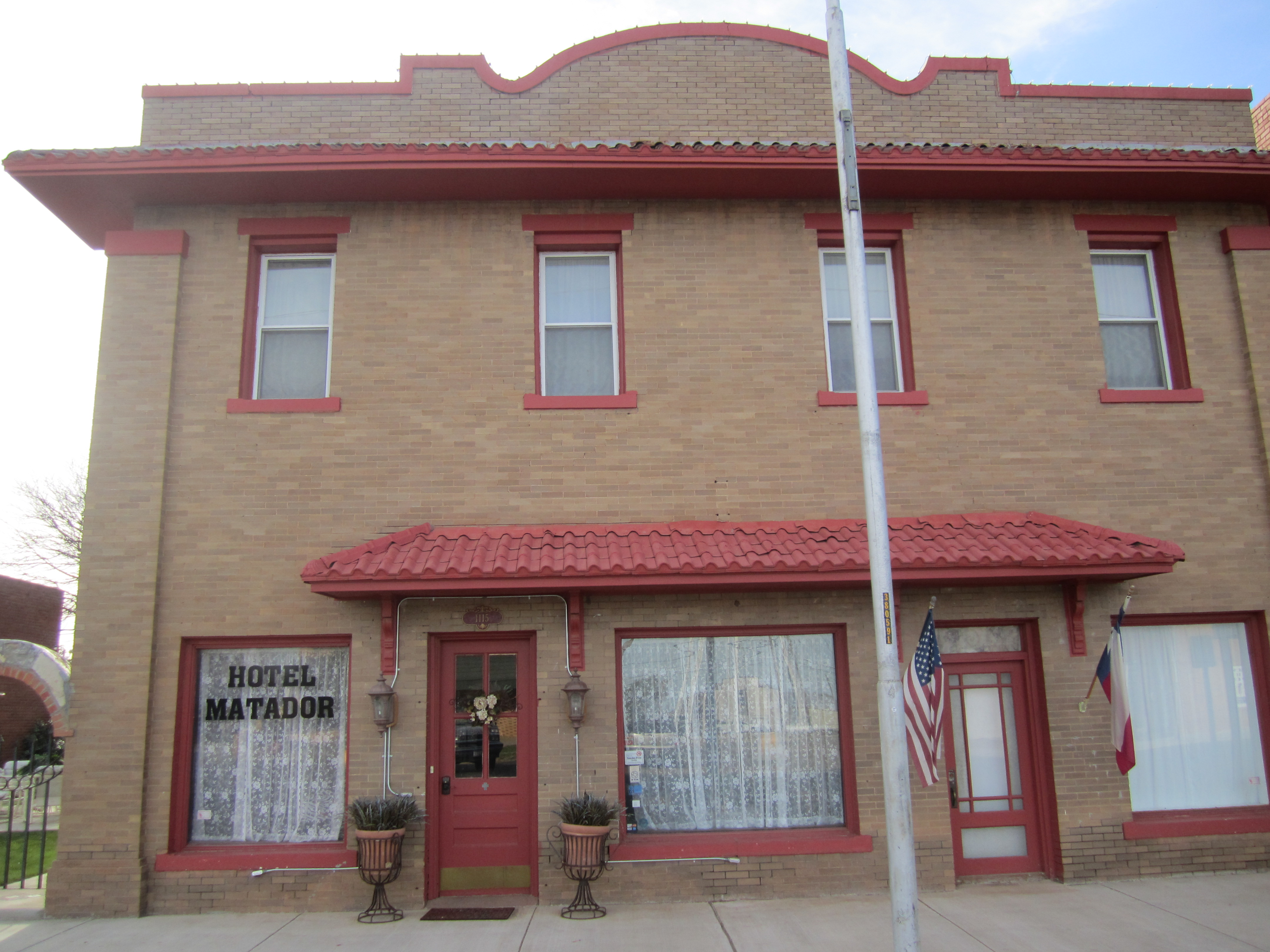
The restored Hotel Matador was founded in 1914 as the Carter Hotel.

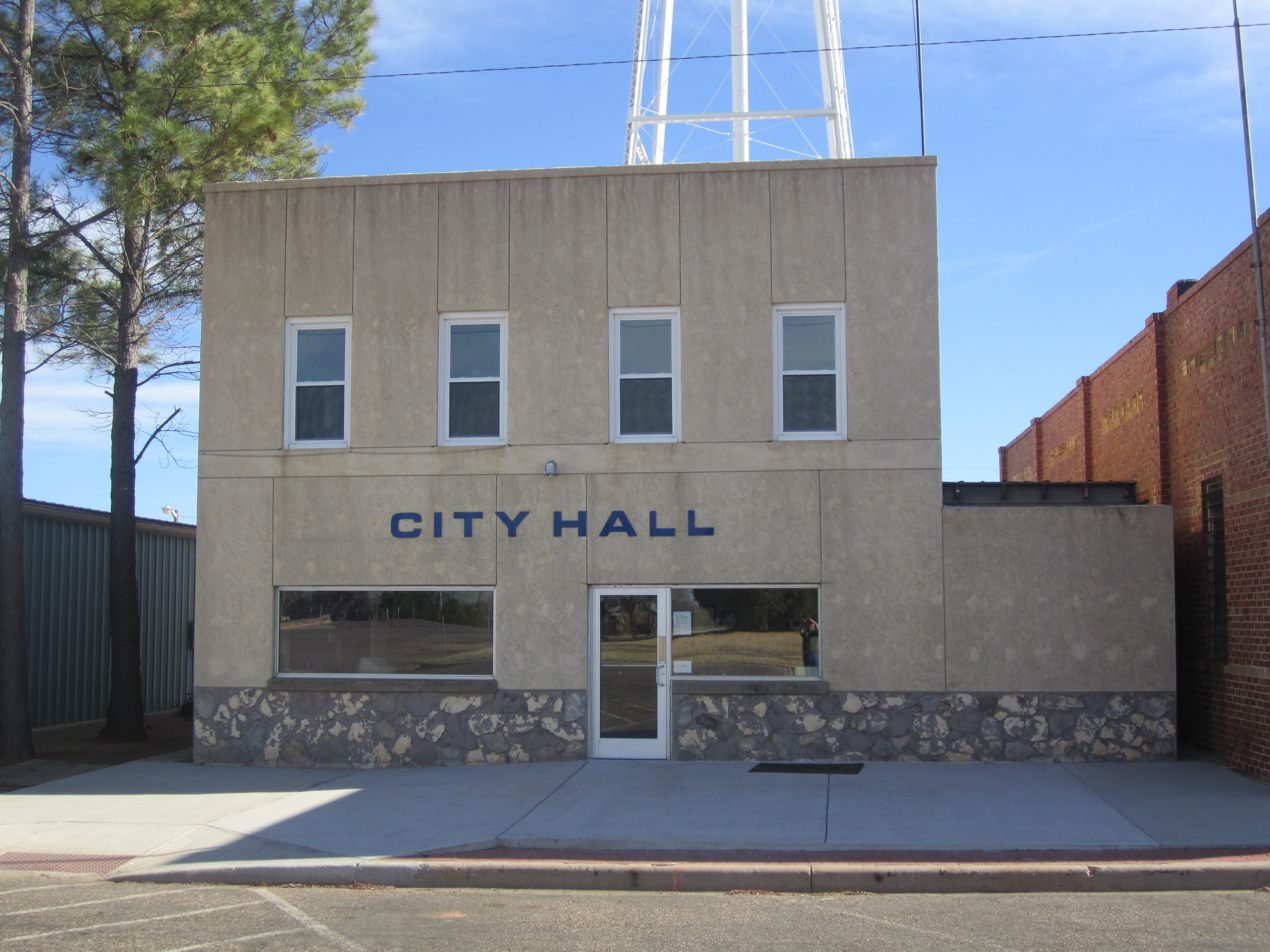
Matador City Hall

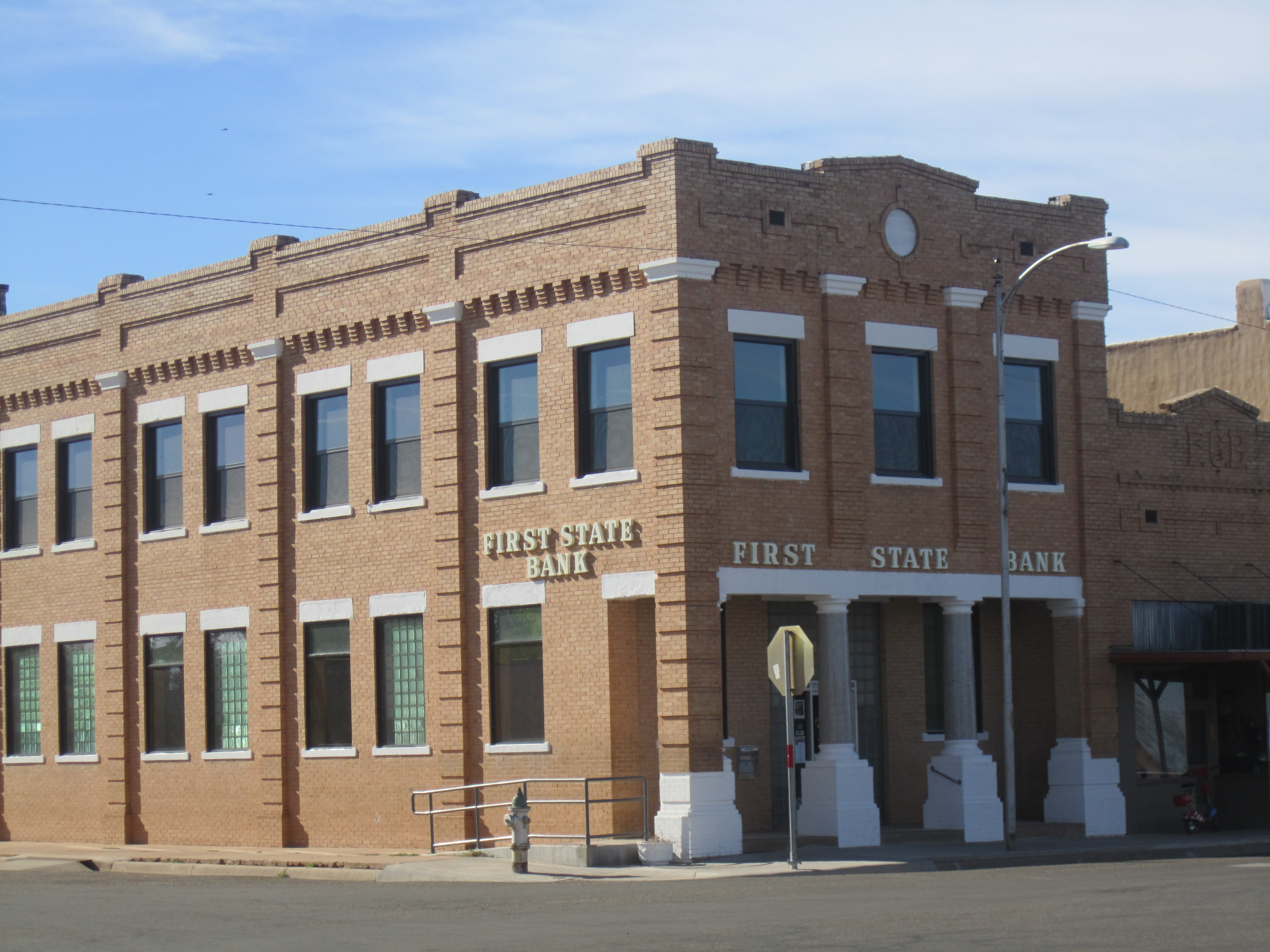
First State Bank in Matador, Texas

=== Hotel Matador ===
Originally the Carter Hotel, the Hotel Matador was built in 1914 by Roy Carter and his wife, the former Jessie Simpson. For a rural area, the hotel had luxurious rooms with a bell hop, a full-time gardener, and laundry service. It had 15 rooms, a dining room, and a large 9-foot, oak-rimmed tub as the only bathroom in the facility. An ice cream parlor, which ran the length of the lobby, operated until the 1920s.

The name "Hotel Matador" was coined in the 1920s. The hotel changed owners several times. Under the direction of Judge C.B. Whitten, it was a community gathering place for meetings, parties, and dances for young people. In 1941, hotelier and barber Warren Clements purchased the property. He turned the ice cream parlor into a barber shop. He also established living quarters for his wife, Faye, and himself, with an apartment behind the hotel. Mrs. Clements maintained an English garden cultivating prize irises, and under her tutelage, the hotel was known for its entertainment.

In 1980, Johnny (Sonny) and Evelyn Jackson purchased the hotel and restyled it into apartments. It later became a single residence, but had been abandoned for five years when three sisters took possession and began reclaiming and restoring the historic facility. The sisters, Marilyn Hicks, Linda Roy, and Caron Perkins, operate the Matador as an eight-unit bed and breakfast. The barber shop was converted to the Circle Cross Heritage suite, with the original tin ceiling and elaborate bathroom fixtures.

=== Traweek House ===
Albert Carroll Traweek, Sr., (1875–1959) was a physician in Matador, originally from Fort Worth, known as the "pneumonia doctor" for his success in treating patients with that sometimes fatal illness. He was the first Motley County public health officer and established the Traweek Hospital, now the Motley County Historical Museum. In 1915, Dr. Traweek began construction on the Traweek Home, designed by Charles Stephen Oates, Traweek's uncle and a noted builder in West Texas. The two-story stuccoed masonry structure was completed in 1916 at a cost of $14,000. It is a hybrid of Classical Renaissance, Prairie, and Classical Revival architecture.

Among the visitors to the Traweek House was Baldwin Parker, a son of Quanah Parker, the last Comanche chief, as well as state and national officials. The house at 927 Lariat Street in Matador remains in the Traweek family. It received an official historical medallion in 1964 and was designated in 1990 as a Texas Historic Landmark. Dr. Traweek and his wife, the former Allie Rainey, had six children. The house was last occupied by their youngest son, Howard Traweek (1912–1988), the county attorney for five decades, and his wife, the former Eleanor Mitchell (1922–1998).

=== Bob's Oil Well ===
Luther Bedford "Bob" Robertson (1894–1947), a native of Greenville, Texas, came to Matador in the 1920s. Originally a service-station attendant, he opened his own Conoco gasoline business, which he topped with a decorative wooden oil derrick. He patented his design, and in 1939, he replaced the wooden derrick with one of steel. It stood 84 ft in height and was lighted.

Robertson advertised his business in unusual ways, having maintained a cage of live rattlesnakes for the amusement of tourists. He later added a small zoo of lions, monkeys, and coyotes, and a white buffalo. He paid long-distance truckers to place advertising signs at strategic points across the United States. The signs noted the mileage to Bob's Oil Well in Matador. Matador is equidistant from Dallas and Carlsbad, New Mexico, and 9 miles (14 km) closer to Denver than to El Paso. Robertson soon expanded his operation to include a grocery store, café, and garage. He was also a Matador civic leader who sought to recognize returning veterans from World War II.

Robertson died in 1947, two weeks before a high wind toppled the steel derrick that had been his trademark. His widow, the former Olga Cunningham (1904–1993), restored it in 1949 with even more prominent lights. Ultimately, the business failed, and attempts by others to revive it were short-lived. At the intersection of U.S. Route 70 and State Highway 70, the site serves as a reminder of a time when bold roadside architecture was only beginning, and of a man who promoted his adopted hometown in extraordinary ways.

== Education ==
The Town of Matador is served by the Motley County Independent School District, and home to the Motley County High School Matadors.

Motley County is in the service area of South Plains College.

== Notable people ==
- Karen Elliott House, Pulitzer Prize-winning journalist and former executive at Dow Jones International
- Roy Ratcliff, Christian minister, was born in Matador
- Stanley Rose, famous Hollywood bookseller of the 1930s, was born in Matador

== See also ==
- Quitaque Creek
- Little Red River (Texas)
- Caprock Escarpment
- Prairie Dog Town Fork Red River
