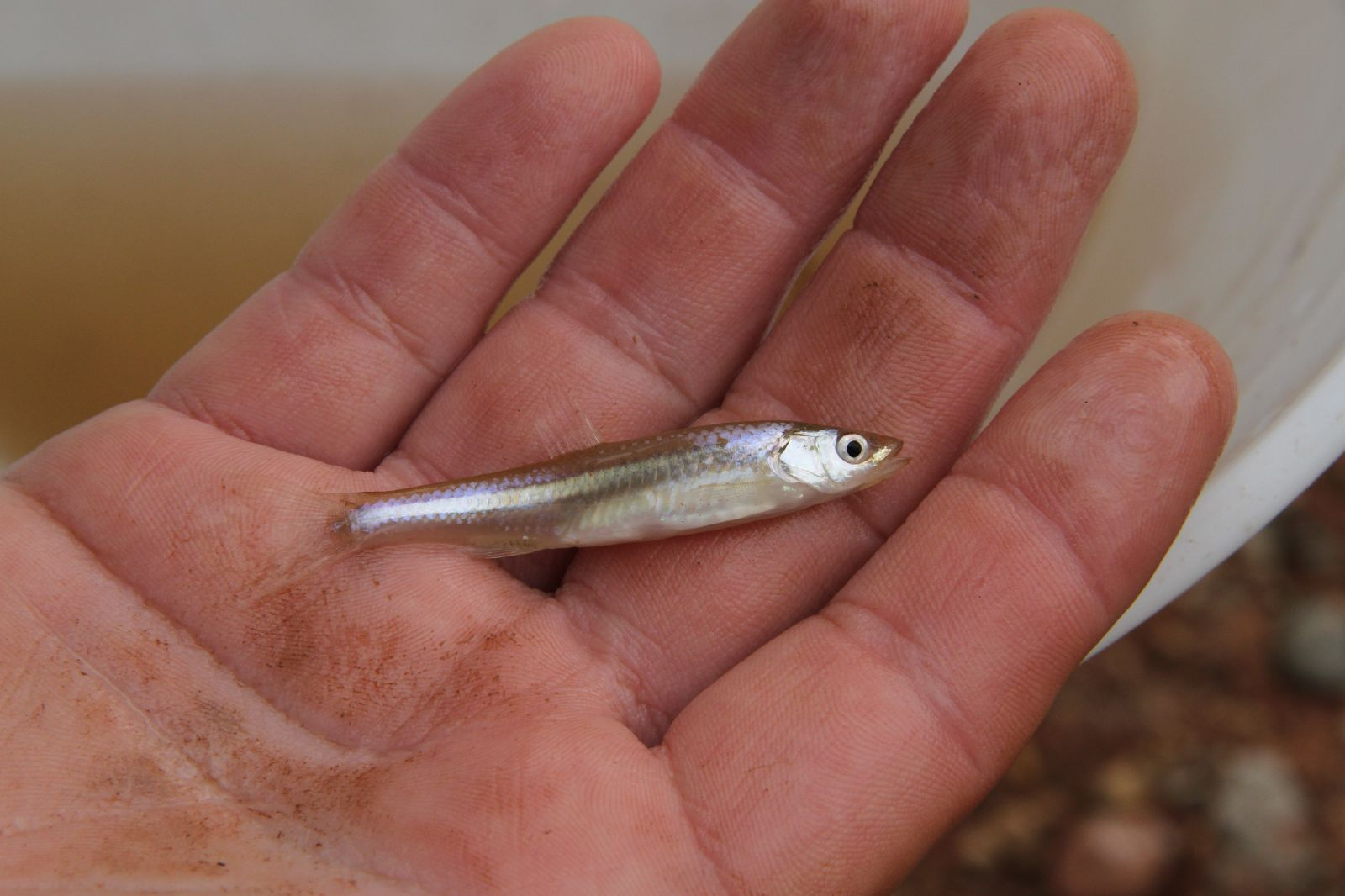

Conservation status
- Vulnerable (IUCN 3.1)

Scientific classification
- Kingdom: Animalia
- Phylum: Chordata
- Class: Actinopterygii
- Division: Teleostei
- Order: Cypriniformes
- Family: Leuciscidae
- Subfamily: Pogonichthyinae
- Genus: Notropis
- Species: N. oxyrhynchus

Binomial name
- Notropis oxyrhynchus Hubbs & Bonham, 1951

= Sharpnose shiner =

Species of fish

The sharpnose shiner (Notropis oxyrhynchus) is a species of freshwater ray-finned fish in the family Leuciscidae, the shiners, daces and minnows. It is endemic to Texas in the United States, where it is limited to the upper Brazos River basin. In 2013 it became a candidate for federal listing as an endangered species of the United States.

== Description ==
This is a slender minnow generally measuring 3 to 5 centimeters in length at maturity, but it is known to reach 9.5 centimeters. It is silver with a faint line extending from the gills to the tail. The snout is pointed.

== Distribution ==
Today the fish occurs mainly in the upper Brazos River system above Possum Kingdom Lake, it is rarely observed below this reservoir and may be extirpated from most or all of the tributaries in the lower river system. Populations are extirpated from the Wichita River, which represented nearly 70% of the known former range of the species. In the upper Brazos it is still a common species.

== Biology ==
This freshwater fish inhabits medium and large rivers, channels, and pools. It can be found in shallow, turbid waters over sand and mud substrates.

The fish feeds on aquatic and terrestrial invertebrates, including flies, caddisflies, bugs, beetles, odonates, and ostracods. It consumes large amounts of sand and sediment, suggesting that it forages on the riverbed. It may also consume some plant material.

Its life history is not well documented.

== Conservation ==
Several threats have contributed to the decline of the species.

Inflow from reservoirs has altered the physical and biological characteristics of the river system, such as temperature, flow patterns, and turbidity, and have contributed to habitat fragmentation and other changes to the ecosystem. The Possum Kingdom, Granbury, and Whitney Reservoirs have produced changes in the aquatic faunal communities of the Brazos River. The construction of more reservoirs is expected to prevent the fish from recolonizing habitat where it is now absent.

The invasive plant salt cedar (Tamarix spp.) has become abundant along the Brazos River, its spread aided by the construction of reservoirs. The plant likely increases sedimentation and alters water flow, making parts of the habitat unsuitable for the fish.

The Brazos River is a relatively saline river because of the salts in the surrounding land and a salty aquifer beneath, and the fish is adapted to the saline waters. There is increasing interest in desalination of the river water for municipal use. Planned desalination projects include the construction of wells, pipelines, evaporation ponds, and reservoirs for water treatment. These projects, as well as ongoing wastewater and agricultural runoff, are expected to alter water and habitat quality. Gravel and sand mining have produced significant effects on the lower Brazos, but their specific impacts on the fish are not clear. Algal blooms may also affect the species, but evidence is not yet available.

== See also ==
- Double Mountain Fork Brazos River
- North Fork Double Mountain Fork Brazos River
- Salt Fork Brazos River
- Smalleye Shiner
- White River (Texas)
- Yellow House Canyon
