= Ransom Canyon, Texas =

Town in Lubbock County, Texas, United States

Ransom Canyon
- Town
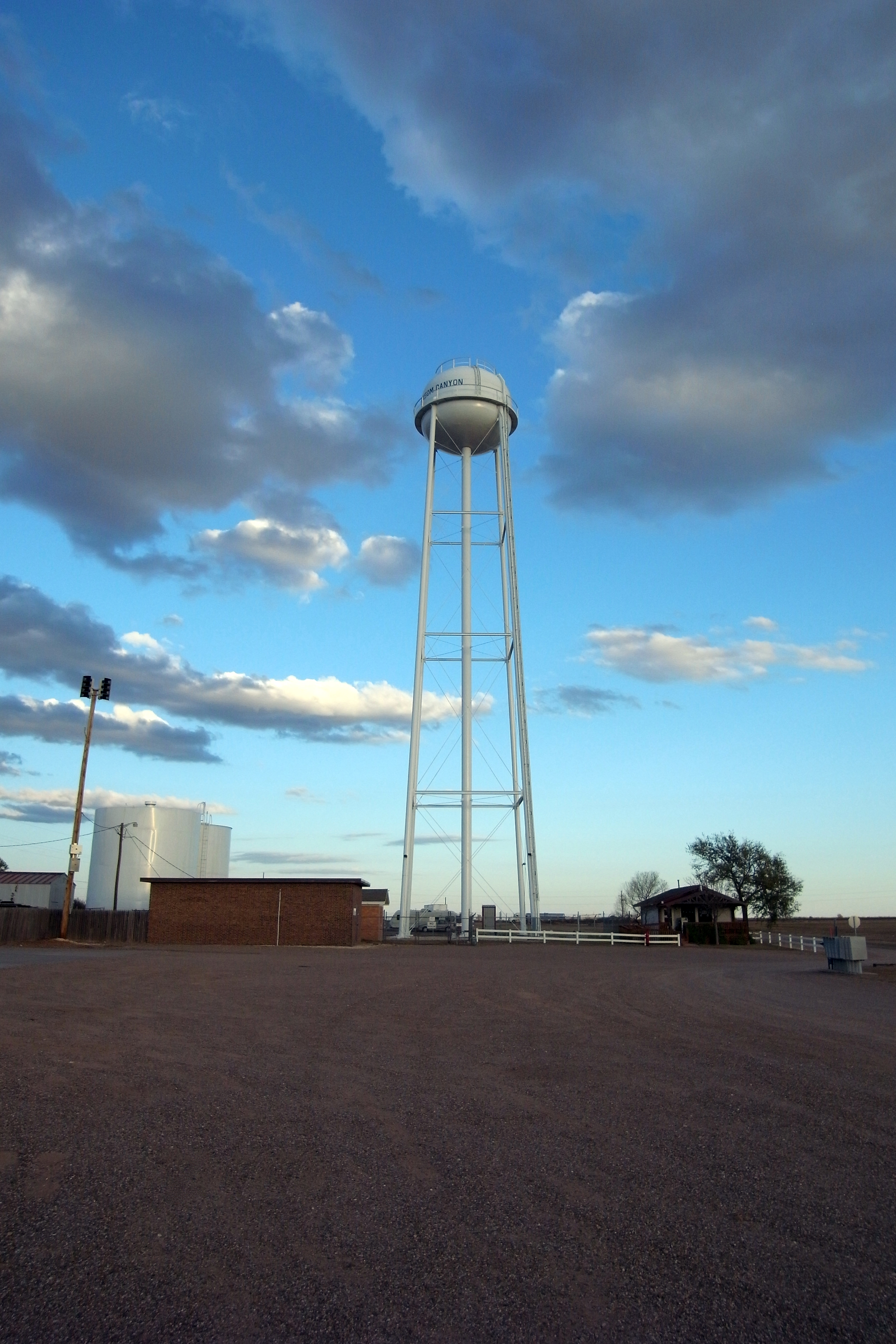
- Ransom Canyon water tower, November 2009

- Location within Texas
- Coordinates: 33°32′00″N 101°40′47″W
- Country: United States
- State: Texas
- County: Lubbock
- Region: Llano Estacado
- Established: 1965

Area
  - Total: 0.94 sq mi (2.44 km^{2})
  - Land: 0.79 sq mi (2.04 km^{2})
  - Water: 0.15 sq mi (0.40 km^{2})
- Elevation: 3,104 ft (946 m)

Population (2020)
  - Total: 1,189
  - Density: 1,510/sq mi (583/km^{2})
- Time zone: UTC-6 (CST)
- ZIP code: 79364, 79366
- Area code: 806
- FIPS code: 48-60672
- GNIS feature ID: 1388617
- Website: www.townofransomcanyon.gov

Ransom Canyon is a town in Lubbock County of West Texas, United States. The population was 1,189 at the 2020 census. It is part of the Lubbock Metropolitan Statistical Area.

== Geography ==
The town of Ransom Canyon is located within Yellow House Canyon, at the eastern edge of the Llano Estacado. Yellow House Canyon was carved by the North Fork Double Mountain Fork Brazos River. This stream has been dammed multiple times to form Buffalo Springs Lake and Lake Ransom Canyon.

According to the United States Census Bureau, the town has a total area of 0.93 square miles (2.4 km^{2}), of which 0.77 square miles (2.0 km^{2}) is land and 0.15 square miles (0.4 km^{2}), or 16.38%, is water.

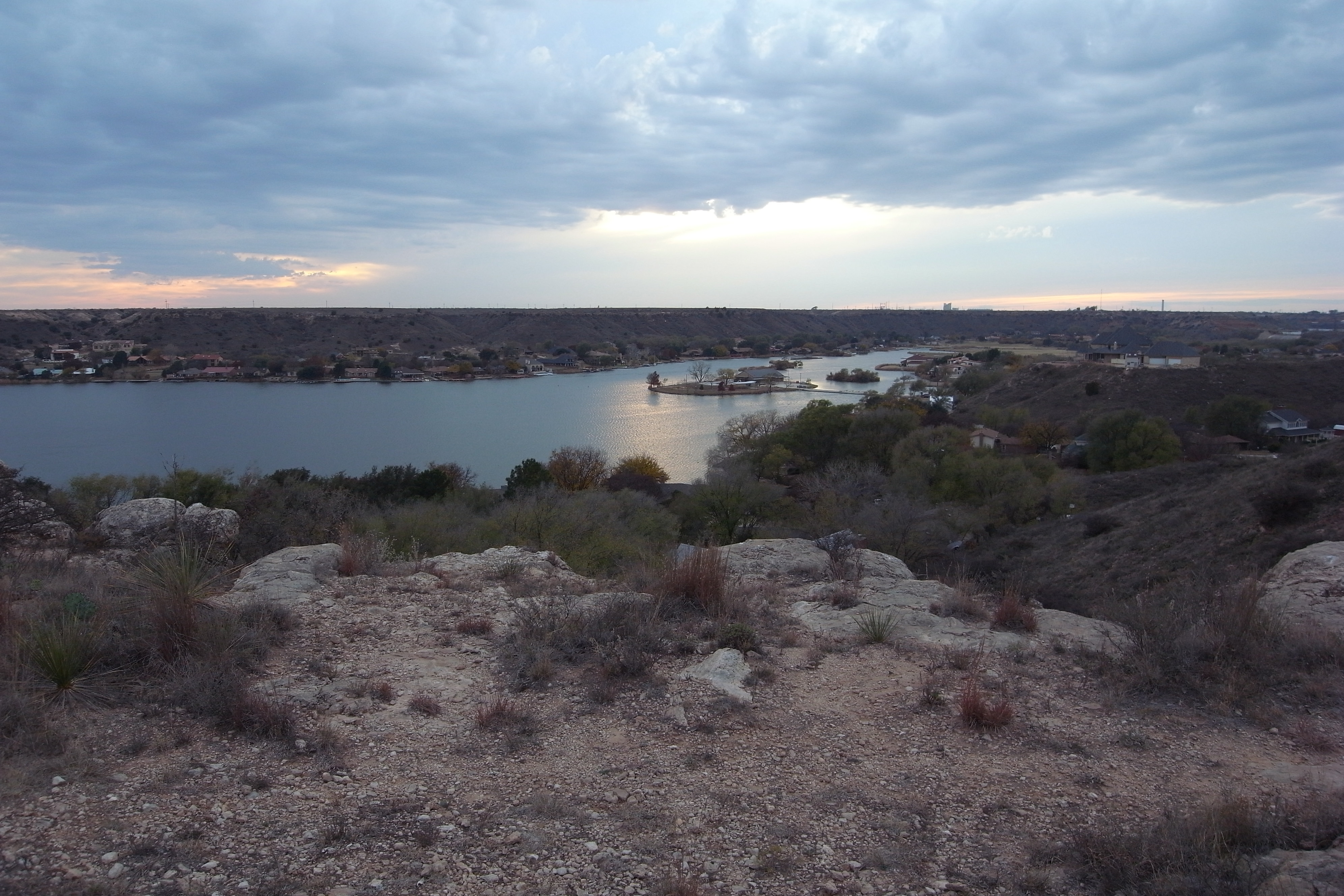
Lake Ransom Canyon

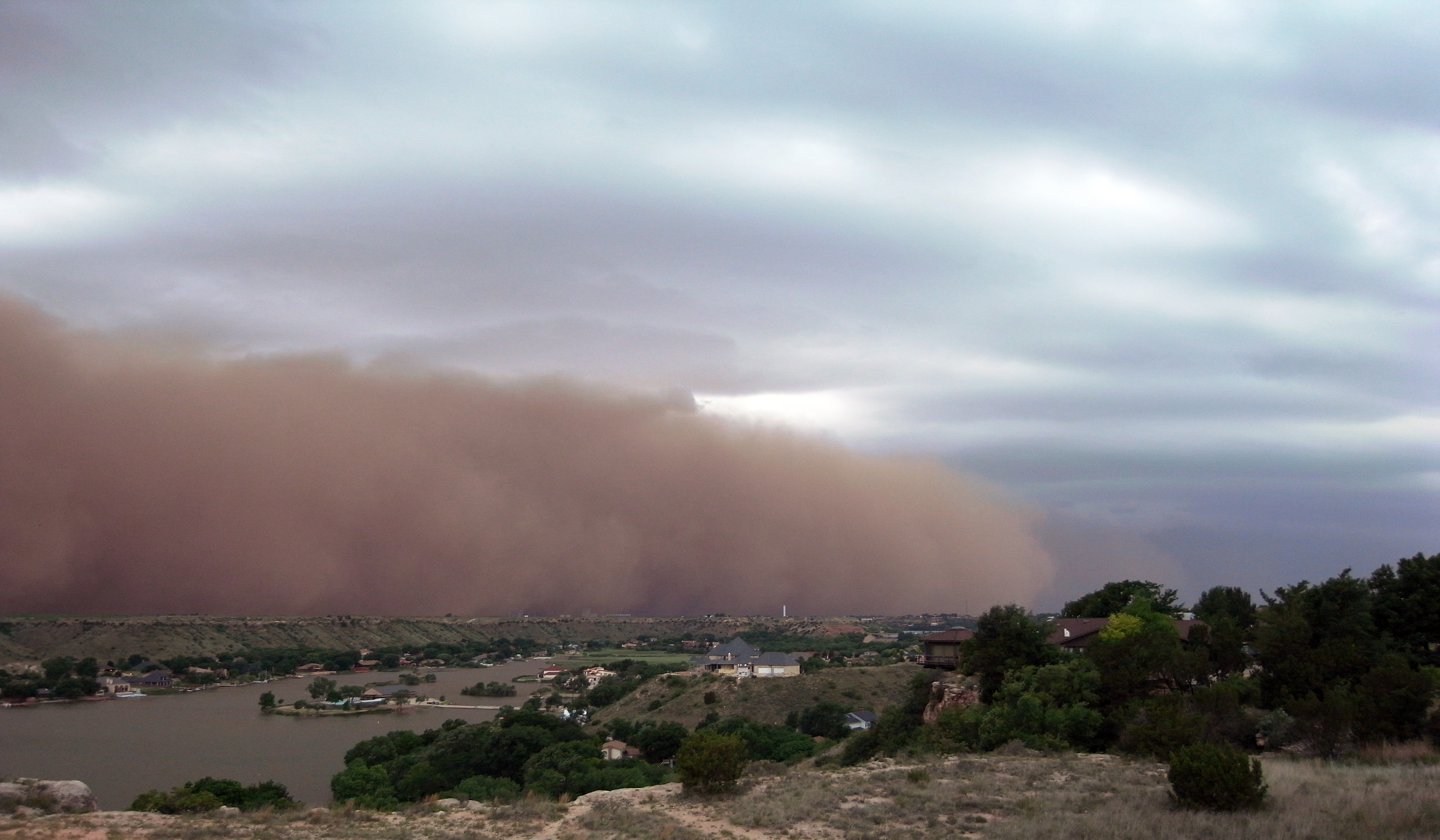
Gust-front dust cloud moving across the Llano Estacado toward Ransom Canyon

=== Climate ===
According to the Köppen Climate Classification system, Ransom Canyon has a semi-arid climate, abbreviated "BSk" on climate maps.

== Demographics ==
Historical population
Census	Pop.	Note	%±
1980	561		—
1990	750		33.7%
2000	1,011		34.8%
2010	1,096		8.4%
2020	1,189		8.5%
U.S. Decennial Census

=== 2020 census ===
Ransom Canyon racial composition (NH = Non-Hispanic) (Note: Note: the US Census treats Hispanic/Latino as an ethnic category. This table excludes Latinos from the racial categories and assigns them to a separate category. Hispanics/Latinos can be of any race.)
Race	Number	Percentage
White (NH)	956	80.4%
Black or African American (NH)	18	1.51%
Native American or Alaska Native (NH)	1	0.08%
Asian (NH)	6	0.5%
Some Other Race (NH)	1	0.08%
Mixed/Multi-Racial (NH)	52	4.37%
Hispanic or Latino	155	13.04%
Total	1,189	

As of the 2020 United States census, there were 1,189 people, 400 households, and 309 families residing in the town.

=== 2000 census ===
As of the census of 2000, there were 1,011 people, 404 households, and 338 families residing in the town. The population density was 1,213 inhabitants per square mile (468/km^{2}). There were 412 housing units at an average density of 494 per square mile (191/km^{2}). The racial makeup of the town was 95.25% White, 0.40% African American, 0.20% Native American, 0.40% Asian, 2.57% from other races, and 1.19% from two or more races. Hispanic or Latino of any race were 4.85% of the population.

There were 404 households, out of which 31.2% had children under the age of 18 living with them, 80.0% were married couples living together, 3.2% had a female householder with no husband present, and 16.1% were non-families. 14.6% of all households were made up of individuals, and 6.9% had someone living alone who was 65 years of age or older. The average household size was 2.50 and the average family size was 2.76.

In the town, the population was spread out, with 22.0% under the age of 18, 4.5% from 18 to 24, 23.5% from 25 to 44, 36.5% from 45 to 64, and 13.5% who were 65 years of age or older. The median age was 45 years. For every 100 females, there were 94.4 males. For every 100 females age 18 and over, there were 90.6 males.

The median income for a household in the town was $78,427, and the median income for a family was $85,944. Males had a median income of $50,000 versus $34,500 for females. The per capita income for the town was $45,675. None of the families and 0.6% of the population were living below the poverty line, including no under eighteens and 0.7% of those over 64.

== Education ==
Ransom Canyon is served by the Roosevelt and Slaton Independent School Districts.

== Robert Bruno ==
Robert R. Bruno Jr. (1945–2008) was a sculptor and inventor born in Los Angeles in 1945. Robert grew up in Mexico and the United States before attending Dominican College in Racine, Wisconsin and graduate school at the University of Notre Dame. He moved to Lubbock in 1971 to teach art at Texas Tech University's school of architecture. In 1982, he and wife Patricia Mills founded P&R Surge Systems.

He started working on The Steel House in 1973, two years after sculpting a similar piece of art (now a permanent installation in front of the TTU School of Architecture), which inspired him to build something bigger to live in. Made of weathering steel and weighing 110 tons on four hollow legs, the 2,200 square foot house on three levels was completed 10 months before his death in 2008.

Robert, in the role of General contractor, along with Master Stone Masons Rick Denser and Manfred Kaiter and investor Mark Lawson, started work on Lawson's 460 ton Rock House in 1991. It had been inspired by the work of Antoni Gaudi.

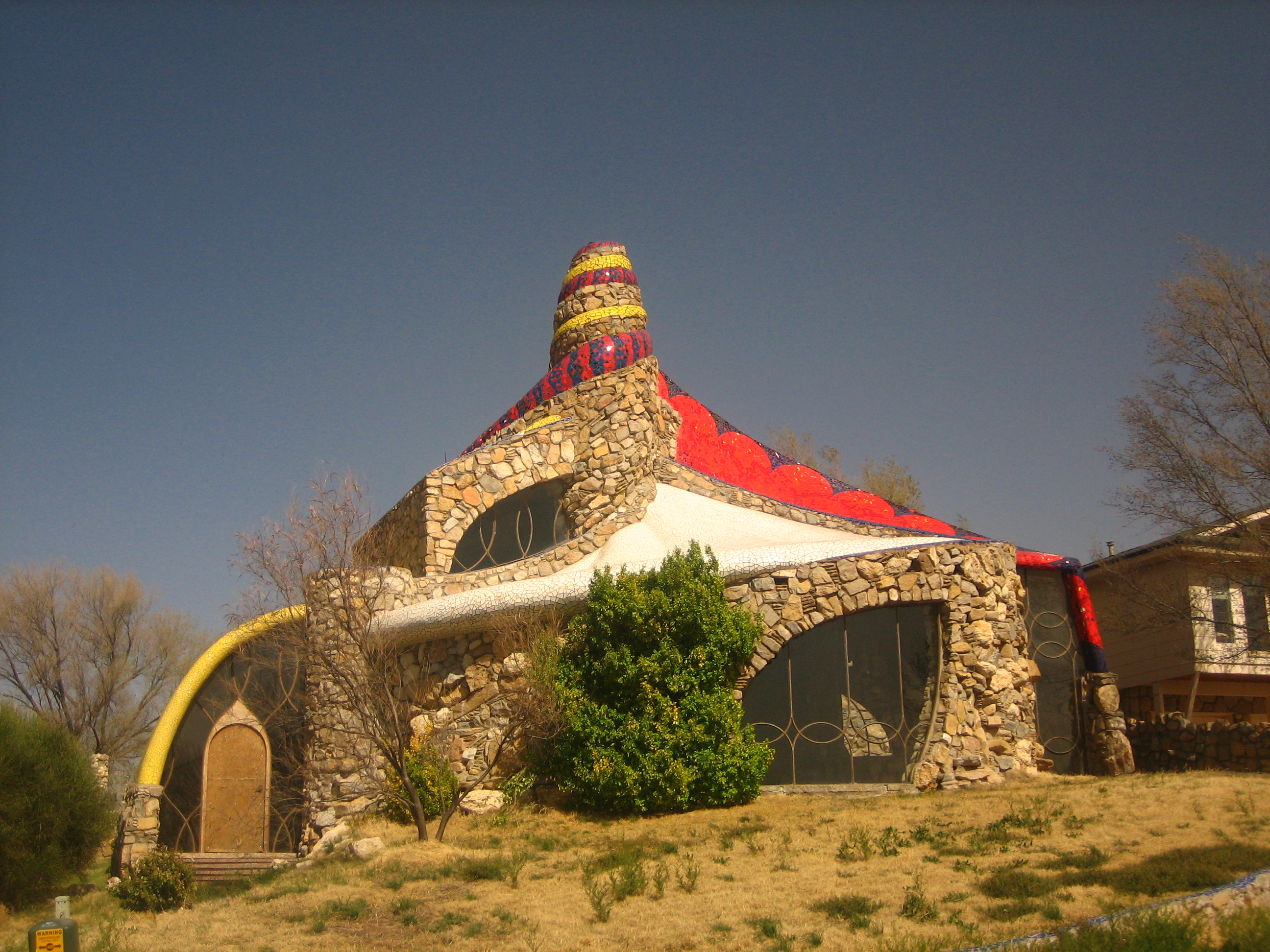
The Lawson Rock House in Ransom Canyon

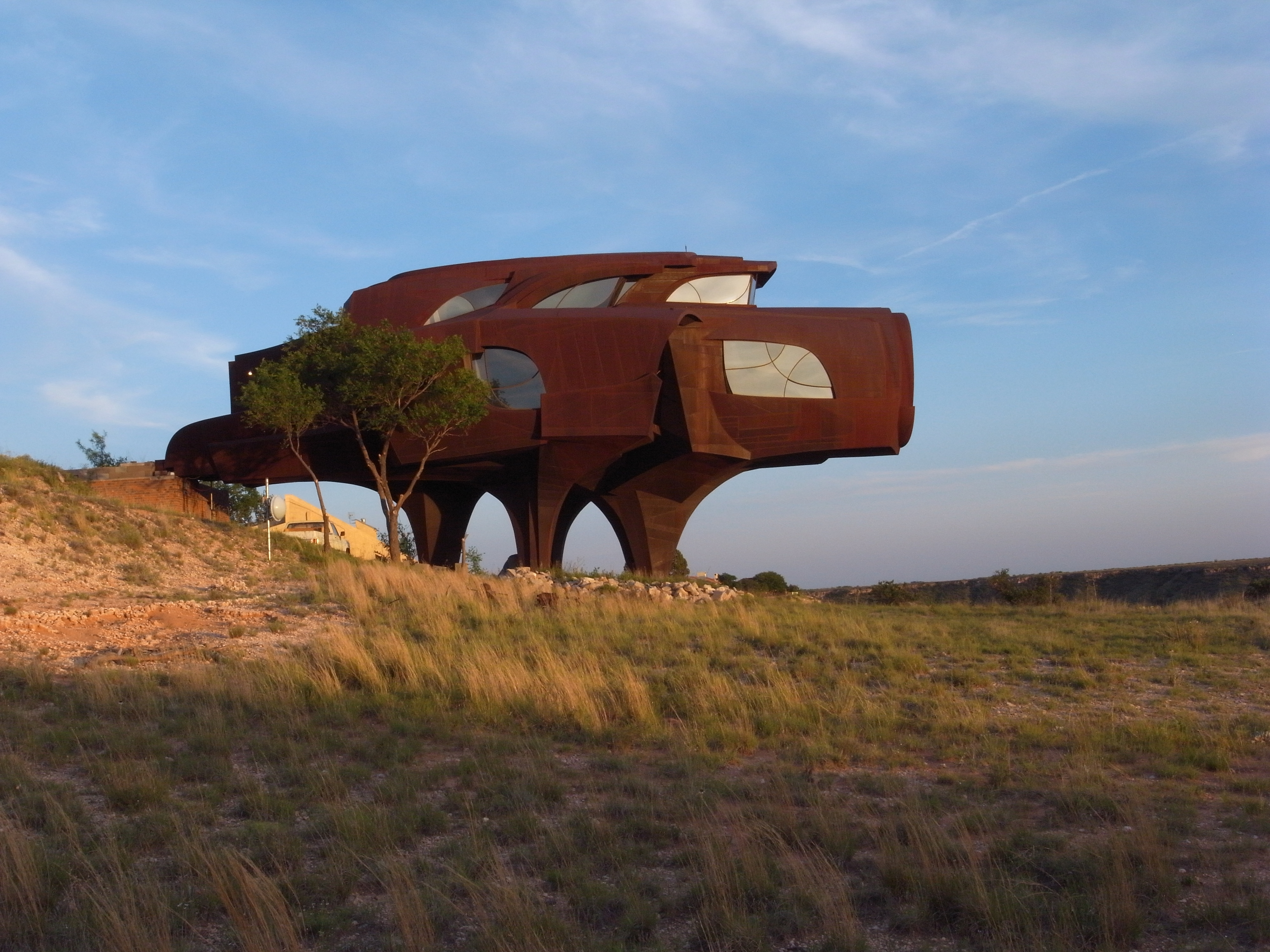
Robert Bruno's Steel House overlooking the rim at Ransom Canyon

== Popular culture ==
On June 25 and 26, 2013, Ransom Canyon was the site of a Vogue (magazine) fall-fashion photo shoot. Three models, Raquel Zimmermann, Toni Garrn and brother Niklas Garrn, were photographed by Steven Klein in and around Robert Bruno's steel house, sometimes wearing Google Glass. Photographs appear in the September 2013 issue of Vogue.

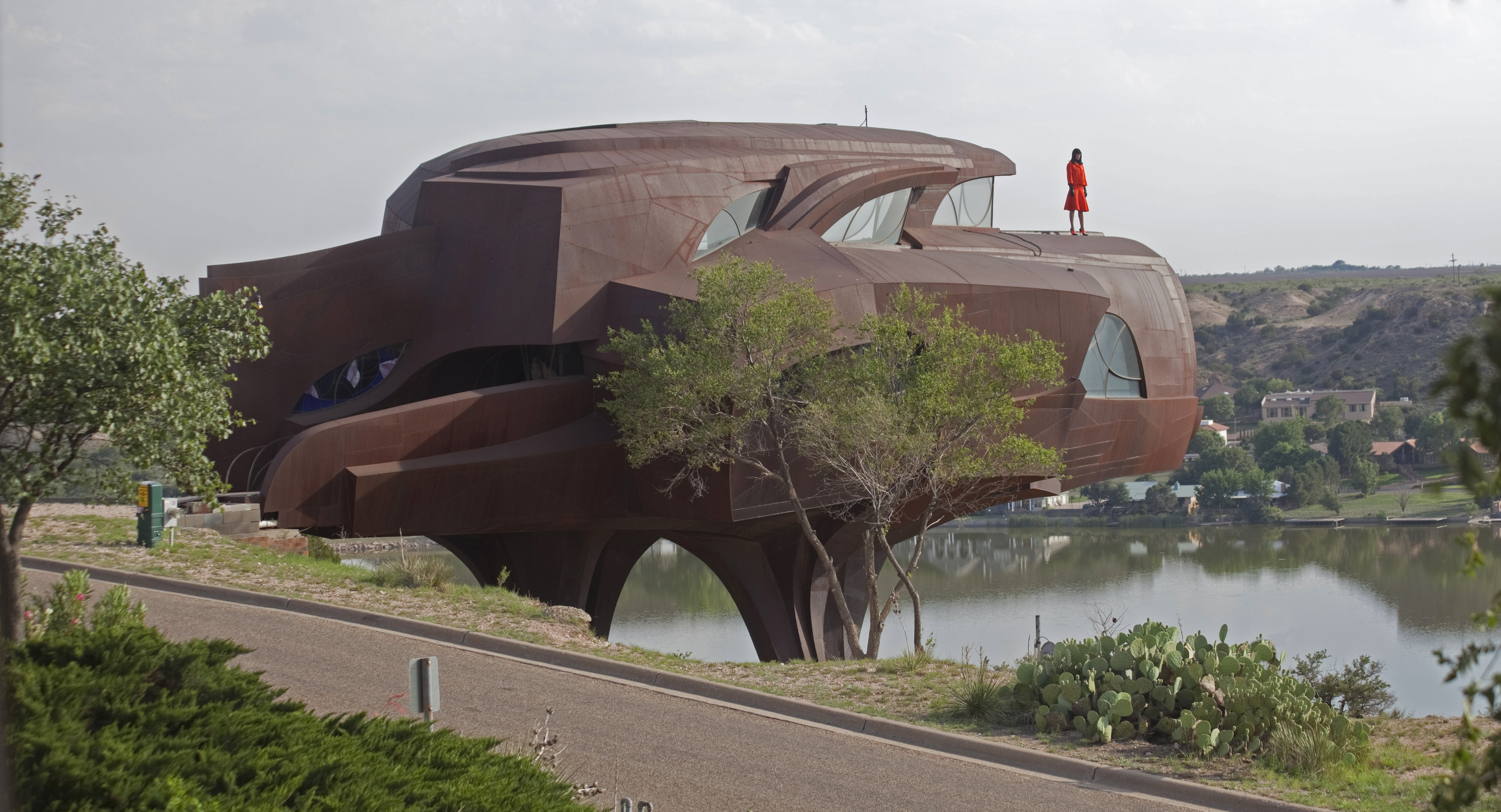
Model Toni Garrn standing on top of Robert Bruno's steel house.

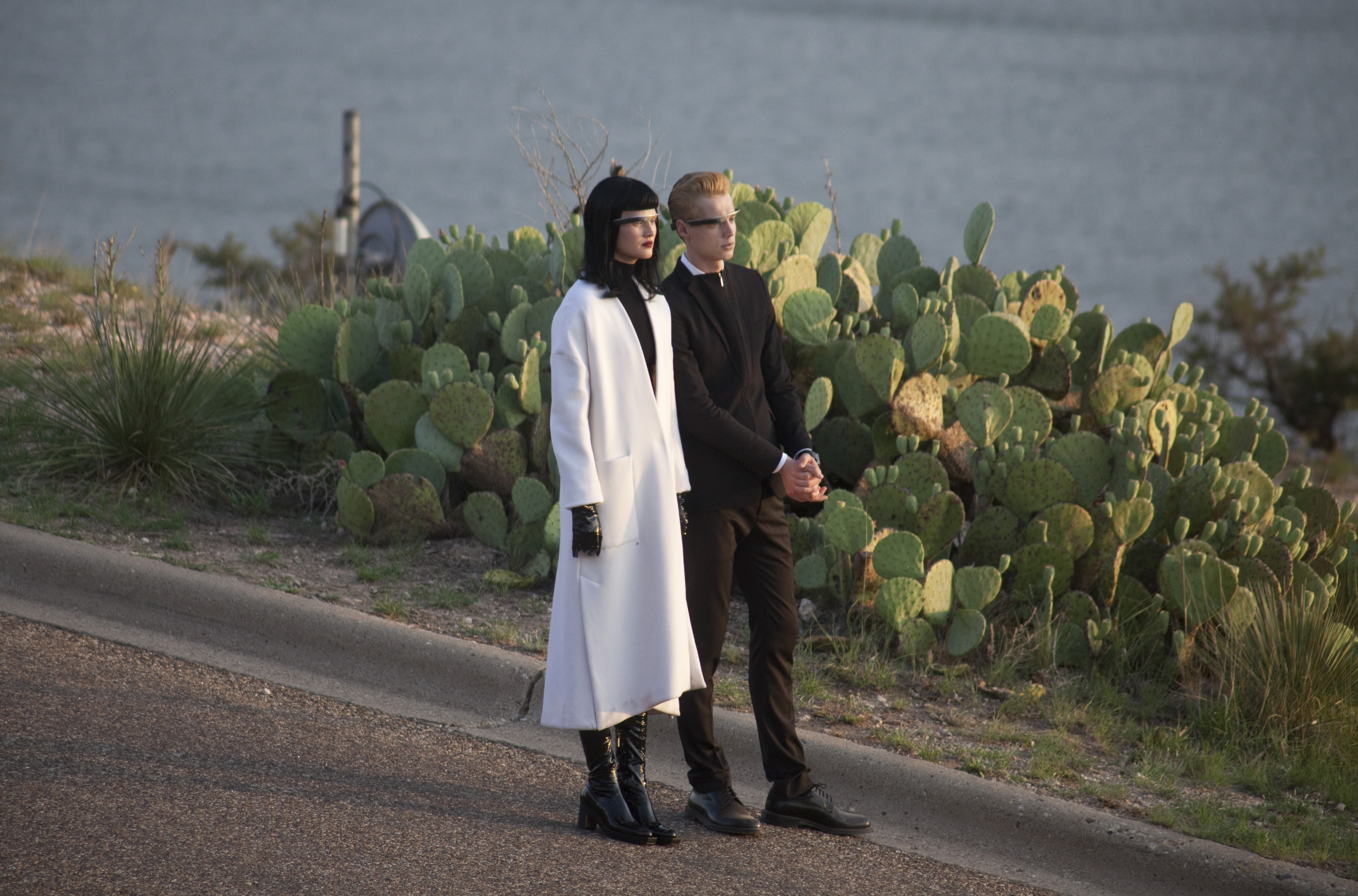
Models Toni Garrn and brother Niklas Garrn strike a pose for Vogue.

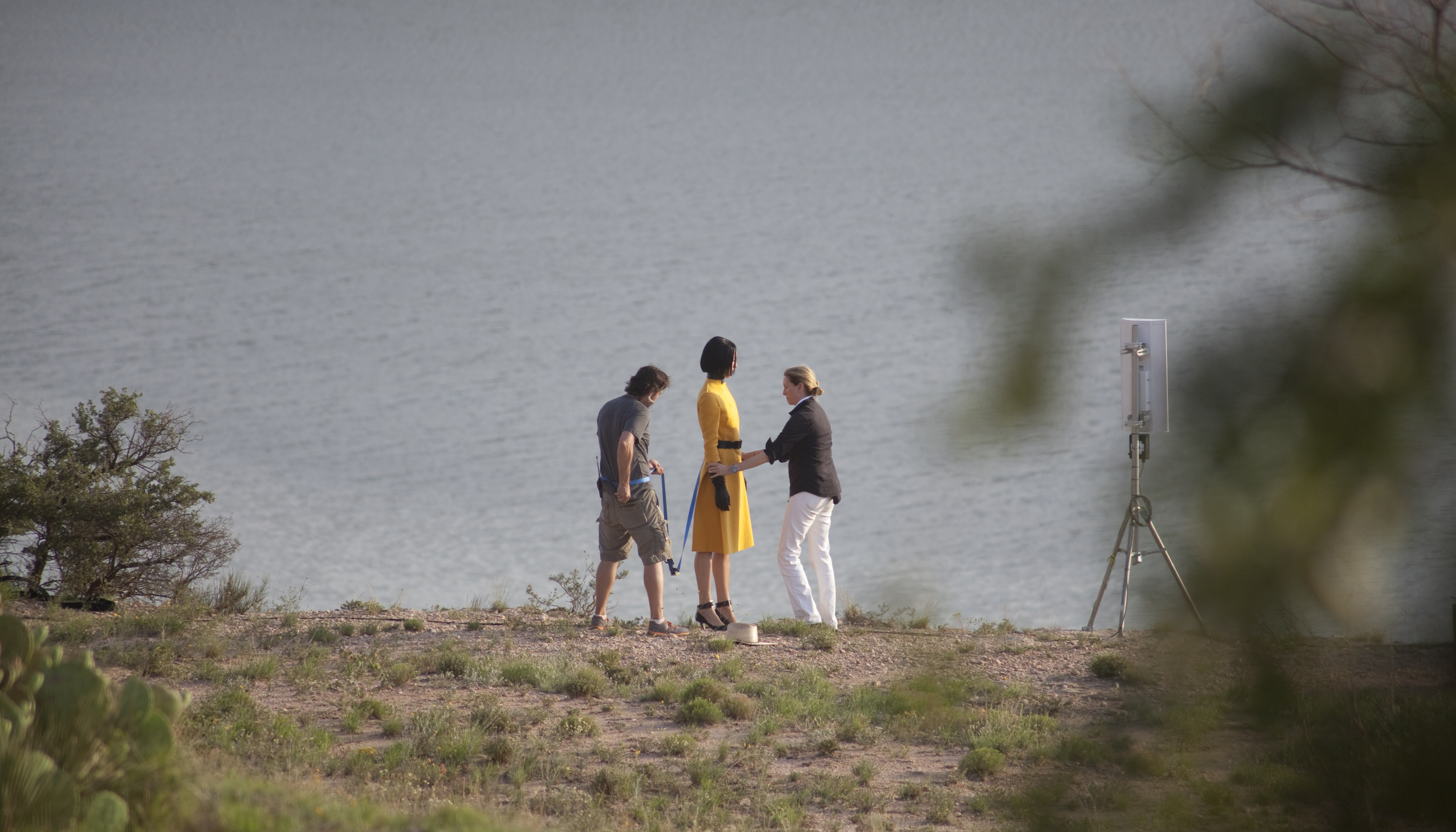
Model Raquel Zimmermann standing on the rim of Yellow House Canyon.

The Steel House was featured on an episode of Texas Country Reporter with Bob Phillips shortly before Bruno's death.

== See also ==
- List of municipalities in Texas
- Caprock Escarpment
- Canyon Valley, Texas
- Duffy's Peak
- Double Mountain Fork Brazos River
- Salt Fork Brazos River
