= Blackwater Draw =

Dry stream channel in New Mexico, US

- Blackwater Draw (Anderson Basin)
- U.S. National Register of Historic Places
- U.S. National Historic Landmark District
- ENMU museum and archaeological logo

- Location within New Mexico Location within the United States
- Nearest city: Clovis and Portales New Mexico
- Coordinates: 34°16′40″N 103°19′28″W
- Area: 3,200 acres (1,300 ha)
- NRHP reference No.: 66000483

Significant dates
- Added to NRHP: October 15, 1966
- Designated NHLD: January 20, 1961

Blackwater Draw is an intermittent stream channel about 140 km (87 mi) long, with headwaters in Roosevelt County, New Mexico, about 18 km (11 mi) southwest of Clovis, New Mexico, and flows southeastward across the Llano Estacado toward the city of Lubbock, Texas, where it joins Yellow House Draw to form Yellow House Canyon at the head of the North Fork Double Mountain Fork Brazos River. It stretches across eastern Roosevelt County, New Mexico, and Bailey, Lamb, Hale, and Lubbock Counties of West Texas and drains an area of 1,560 sq mi (4,040 km^{2}).

== Archaeology ==
Blackwater Draw contains an important archaeological site, called Blackwater Draw National Historic Landmark, first recognized in 1929 by Ridgley Whiteman of Clovis, New Mexico. Blackwater Locality No. 1 (29RV2; LA3324) is the type-site of the Clovis culture. The first large-scale excavation occurred in 1932, though local residents had been collecting bone and lithic materials for decades.

In the 1960s, Frank J. Brolio excavated a camp site just to the northwest of the main site, known colloquially as "Franks Folsom Site". Finds included an especially large chert bi-face. In this period (1952 to 1970), Blackwater Draw was being commercially mined for gravel with a number of mammoth and bison kill stations being uncovered.

In another part of Blackwater draw known as the Mitchell Locality, a large Folsom period campsite was excavated in the 1980s. A number of lithics were recovered, including some with bison and pronghorn blood residue.

Evidence of "fluted" points, spearheads now known as Clovis points (a New World invention) and other stone and bone weapons, tools, and processing implements were found at the archaeological site. The Clovis points were lanceolate and often, though not always, longer than Folsom points.

The Clovis-age artifacts are in association with the remains of extinct Late Pleistocene megafauna, including mammoth, camel, horse, bison, saber-toothed cat, sloth, and dire wolf that were hunted by the early peoples who visited the site. Generations of some of the earliest New World inhabitants hunted and camped at Blackwater Draw, creating stratified levels of archaeological remains from many different time periods, including Clovis, Folsom, Midland, Agate Basin, and various Archaic period occupants.

Clovis chipped stone technology is currently one of the oldest and most widespread such technologies recognized in the New World; radiocarbon dates on sediment from the Clovis layers at Blackwater Draw average around 11,290 years before the present. Two of the projectile points from Blackwater Draw were used as the type specimens to define Clovis chipped stone technology in the 1930s.

The archaeological site is known for its well-defined and dated stratigraphic horizons that exhibit numerous cultural sequences. The sequences begin with some of the earlier New World peoples and continue through the southwestern archaic, and into the historic period. Investigations at Blackwater Draw have recovered protein residue on Clovis weapons, indicating their use as hunting and possibly butchering tools on extinct Pleistocene animals.

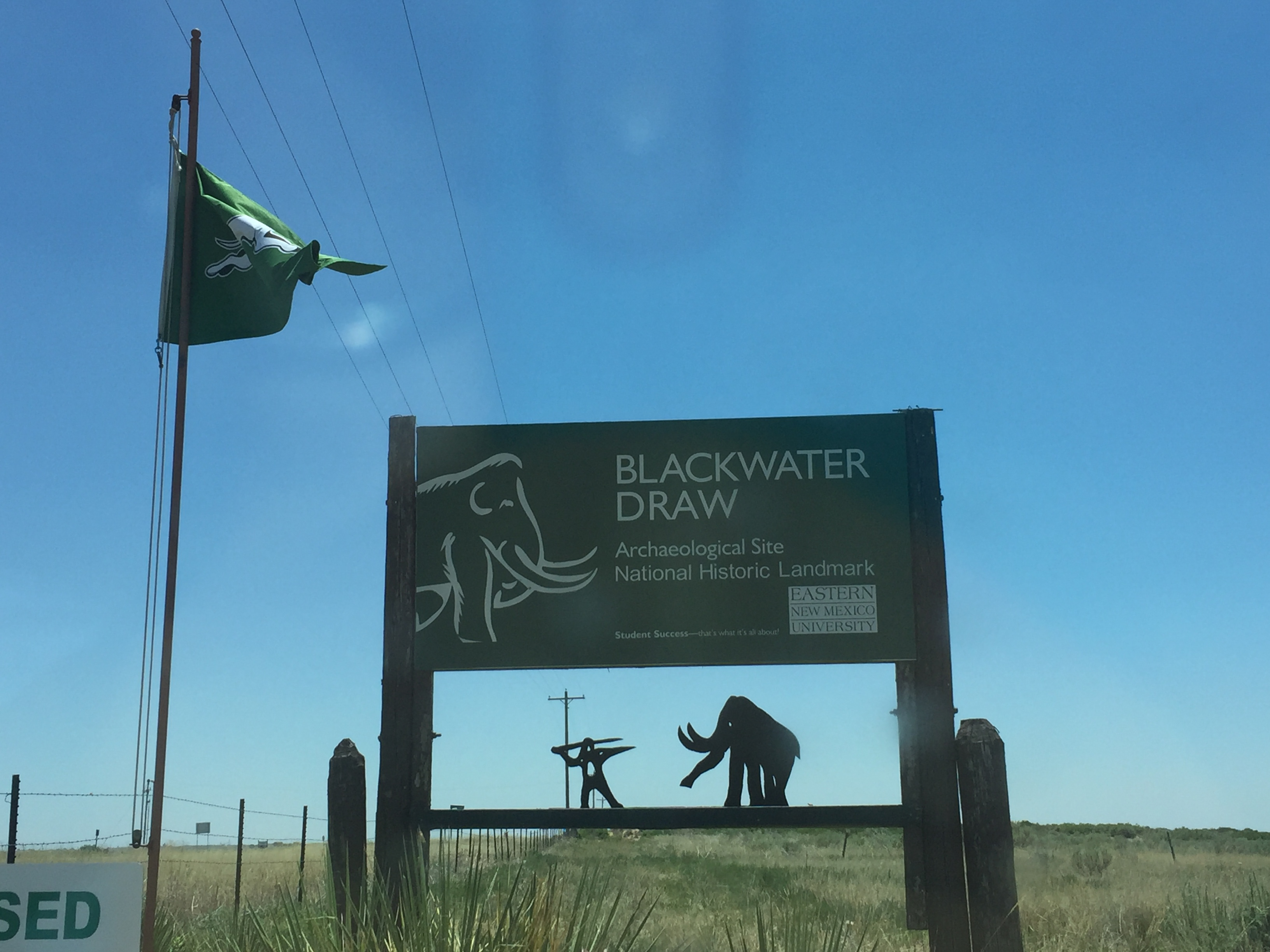
Welcome sign at the Blackwater Draw National Historic Landmark

Towards the end of the Pleistocene period, the climate began to change, which brought warmer and drier weather, causing the water flow in the region to dramatically decrease. This decrease caused small seasonal lake basins called playas to form. These areas became popular hunting locations for early North Americans. In that period the site had a number of active springs. A number of lithics were found in the sandy spring drains. The usual assumption is that they were discarded into the springs though it has been suggested there was a ritual component.

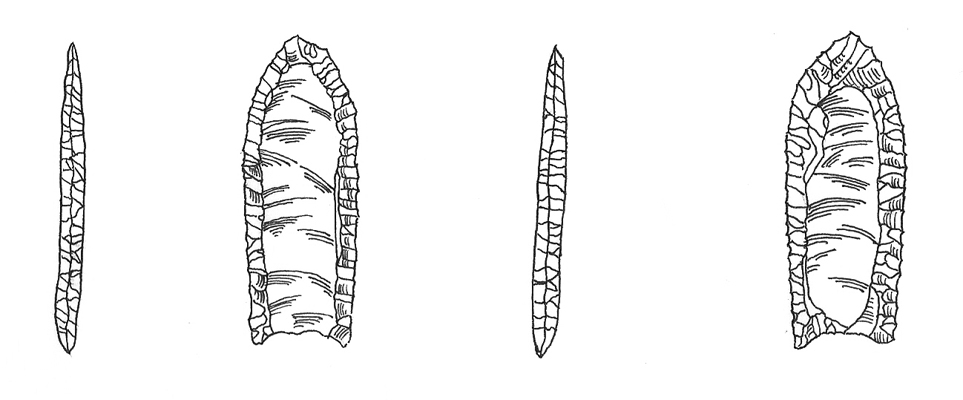
Folsom point-Blackwater Draw

Since its discovery, the Blackwater Locality No. 1 site has been a focal point for scientific investigations by academic institutions and organizations from across the country. The Carnegie Institute, Smithsonian Institution, Academy of Natural Sciences, National Science Foundation, United States National Museum, National Geographic Society, and more than a dozen major universities either have funded or participated in research at Blackwater Draw. Eastern New Mexico University owns and manages the excavations and visitations at the site.

The 3,200-acre (1,300 ha) Anderson Basin district around Blackwater Draw in Roosevelt County, near Clovis and Portales, was declared a National Historic Landmark in 1961 and incorporated into the National Register of Historic Places in 1966.

== Blackwater Draw Museum ==
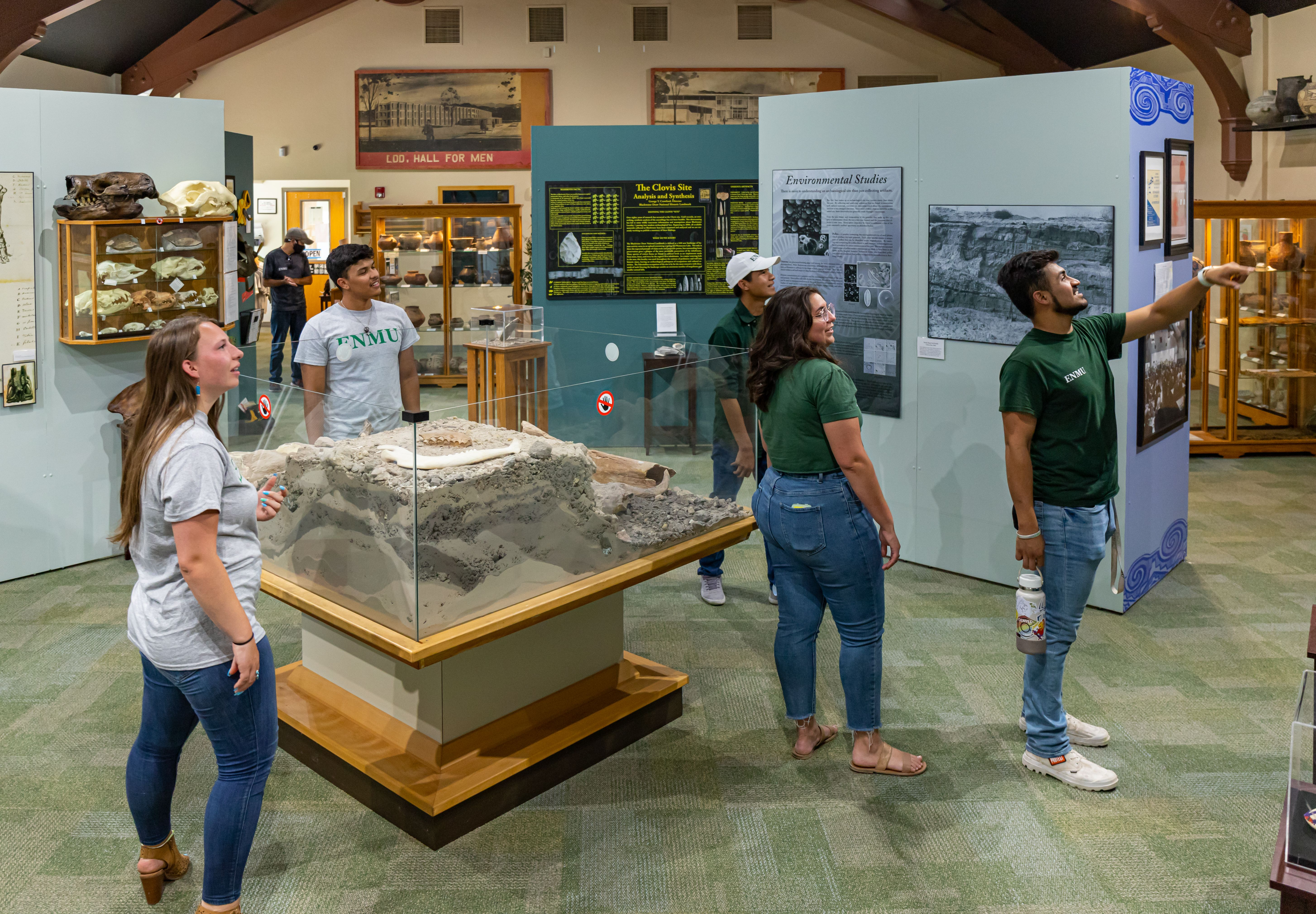
ENMU students visit the Blackwater Draw Museum

The original Blackwater Draw Museum was first opened to the public in 1969, at 42987 Highway 70, Portales, New Mexico, primarily to display artifacts uncovered at the Blackwater Locality No. 1 site. The artifacts and displays illustrated life at the site during the Clovis period (over 13,000 years ago) through the recent historic period.

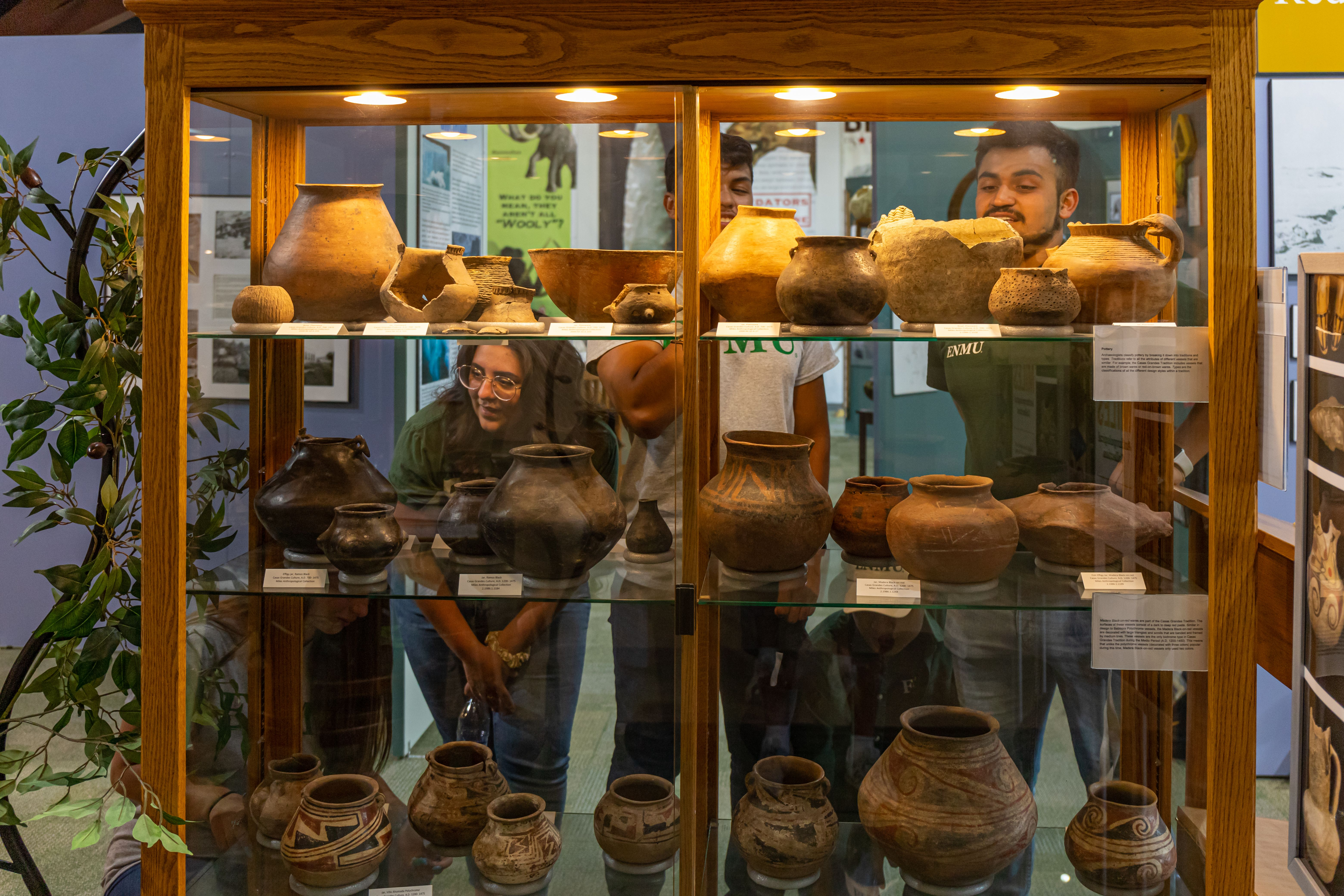
Southwest pottery from the Miles Collection

In 2017, the museum moved onto the Eastern New Mexico University (ENMU) campus and expanded its focus to incorporate local history, as well as archaeology on a broad scale. Exhibits now include descriptions of archaeological work, different archaeological sites, cultural complexes, and scientific methods, among other topics. Visitors can learn more information about Blackwater Draw archaeology and see materials from the greater Southwest obtained from private collections. Currently, the Miles Collection displays Southwestern pottery, basketry, and textiles. As of June 2025, Blackwater Draw is overseen by Director Dr. Brendon Asher, Museum Manager Cenetria Crockett, and Collections Specialist Kylie Colvill.

The museum and site operate under the supervision of ENMU's Department of Anthropology and Applied Archaeology. ENMU students are able to work at the museum and site as student employees, interns, or volunteers. Anthropology students regularly use museum collections for class projects, research, and master's theses work. Both facilities host class visits from ENMU and K-12 schools year-round.

== See also ==
- Blanco Canyon
- Blancan
- Brazos River
- Clovis point
- Llano Estacado
- Lubbock Lake Landmark
- Lubbock Subpluvial
- Mount Blanco
