= North Fork Double Mountain Fork Brazos River =

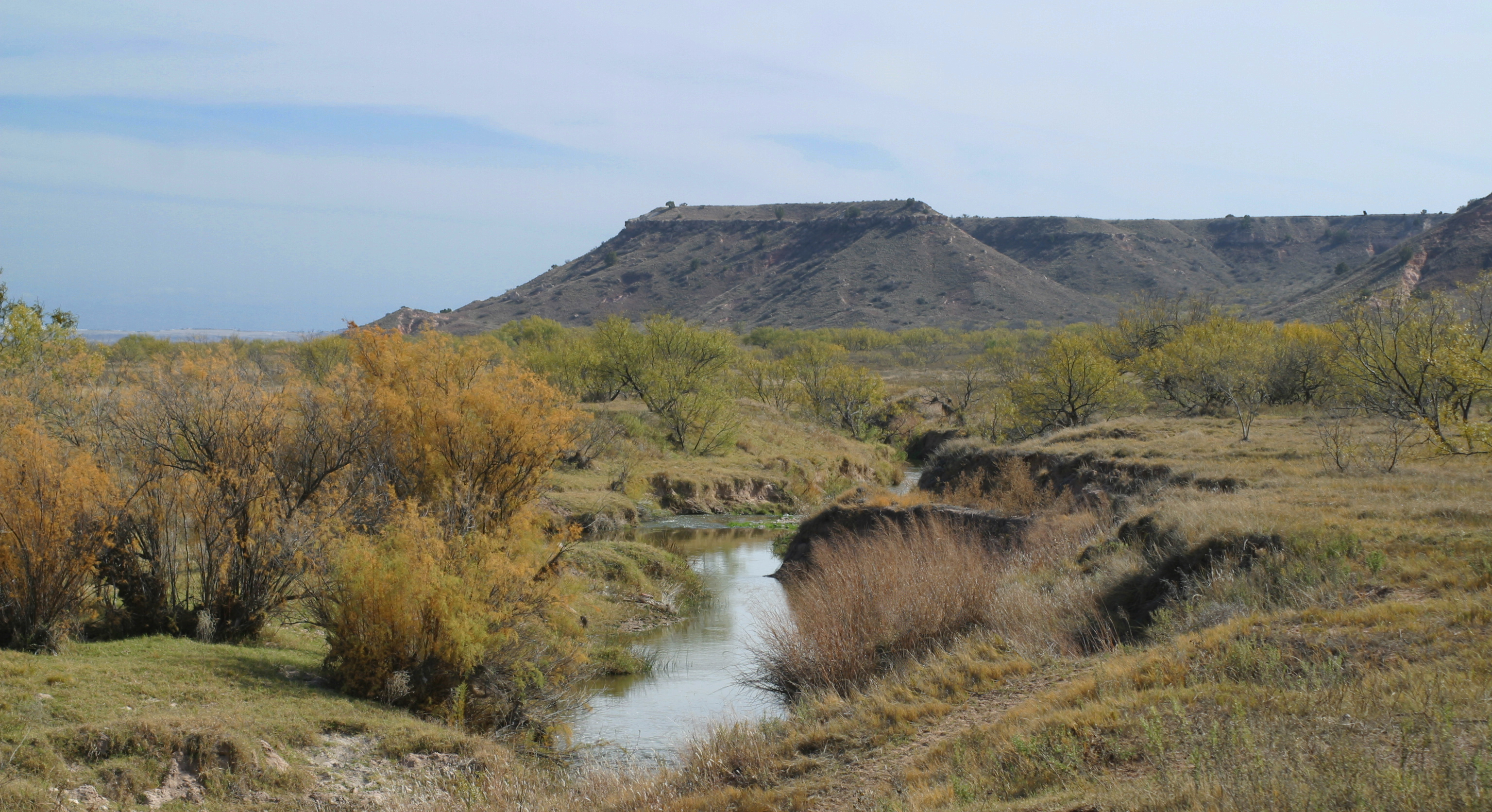
- North Fork flowing through Yellow House Canyon

Location
- Country: United States
- State: Texas

Physical characteristics
- Source: Confluence of Yellow House Draw and Blackwater Draw
  - location: Mackenzie Park, Lubbock, Texas
  - coordinates: 33°35′34″N 101°50′02″W
  - elevation: 3,146 ft (959 m)
- Mouth: Confluence with Double Mountain Fork
  - location: Kent County, Texas
  - coordinates: 33°06′03″N 101°00′01″W
  - elevation: 2,096 ft (639 m)
- Length: 75 mi (121 km)
- Basin size: 1,050 sq mi (2,700 km^{2})

The North Fork Double Mountain Fork Brazos River is an intermittent stream about 75 mi (121 km) long, heading at the junction of Blackwater Draw and Yellow House Draw in the city of Lubbock, flowing generally southeastward to its mouth on the Double Mountain Fork Brazos River in western Kent County. It crosses portions of Lubbock, Crosby, Garza, and Kent counties in West Texas.

The flowing waters of the North Fork carved Yellow House Canyon, one of three major canyons along the east side of the Llano Estacado.

== Proper name ==
In the past, this tributary of the Brazos has been called by various names, including Yellowhouse Creek and Yellow House River. According to a 1964 decision by the United States Board on Geographical Names, this stream is properly called the North Fork Double Mountain Fork Brazos River. However, due to the unwieldy length of the name, it is often shortened to just North Fork.

== Geography ==
Within the city limits of Lubbock, the North Fork is a minor stream that flows through a narrow and shallow channel with a typical width less than 1,500 ft (460 m) and a typical depth not more than 50 ft (15 m). Here the city of Lubbock has constructed a series of small dams that form a series of narrow lakes, collectively known as Canyon Lakes.

As the North Fork extends outside the city limits, Yellow House Canyon gradually widens and deepens. At a distance of 9 mi (14 km) to the east-southeast of Lubbock, a dam was constructed to form Buffalo Springs Lake, a recreational lake that now inundates the site of the main springs, though Buffalo Springs continue to flow beneath the waters of the lake. Immediately downstream of Buffalo Springs Lake is a smaller dam that forms another recreational lake named Lake Ransom Canyon, where numerous single-family homes surround the lake to form the community of Ransom Canyon, Texas.

Downstream of Ransom Canyon, the North Fork flows freely across sparsely populated ranch country as the canyon continues to deepen and widen. Where the North Fork crosses Farm to Market Road 400, a large portion of Lubbock's treated sewage is pumped into the stream via a pipeline that empties at a point called Outfall 001. The City of Lubbock is permitted to discharge as much as 9,000,000 US gal (34,000 m^{3}) of treated effluent into the North Fork each day.

At the point where the North Fork crosses Lubbock County Road 3600, the canyon is nearly 2 mi (3,000 m) wide and 200 ft (60 m) deep. Further downstream, the walls of the canyon begin to curve sharply outward as the North Fork flows out of Yellow House Canyon and onto the rolling plains of West Texas.

To the east of Slaton, the North Fork enters Crosby County, passing to the southwest of Courthouse Mountain and the ghost town of Canyon Valley. After traversing only 8 mi (13 km) across the southwest corner of Crosby County, the stream then enters northern Garza County, where it continues to run southeastward, eventually crossing Texas State Highway 207. Passing to the northeast of Post, the stream crosses Farm to Market Road 651 and then U.S. Highway 380, about 7 mi (11 km) east of Post. The stream then begins trending in a more easterly direction as it meanders wildly, eventually crossing from Garza into Kent County, where it merges with the Double Mountain Fork.

Overall, the North Fork descends 1,050 ft (320 m) from its headwaters to its confluence with the Double Mountain Fork, passing through flat to moderately steep terrain along its course.

== Proposed Post Reservoir ==
The City of Lubbock has proposed the construction of a major reservoir that would impound waters of the North Fork northeast of Post, creating a reservoir roughly 60% of the size of Lake Alan Henry, another city reservoir that impounds waters of the Double Mountain Fork. The proposed Post Reservoir is a key feature in the 2012 State Water Plan for the Llano Estacado Regional Water Planning Area, which encompasses 21 counties on the high plains of the Llano Estacado. The construction of this controversial reservoir would likely lead to the extinction of two rare species of prairie fish - the smalleye shiner and the sharpnose shiner. The Groundwater Management Plan 2024–2029, submitted by the Garza County Underground Water Conservation District in December 2024, still lists the Post Reservoir as “proposed.”

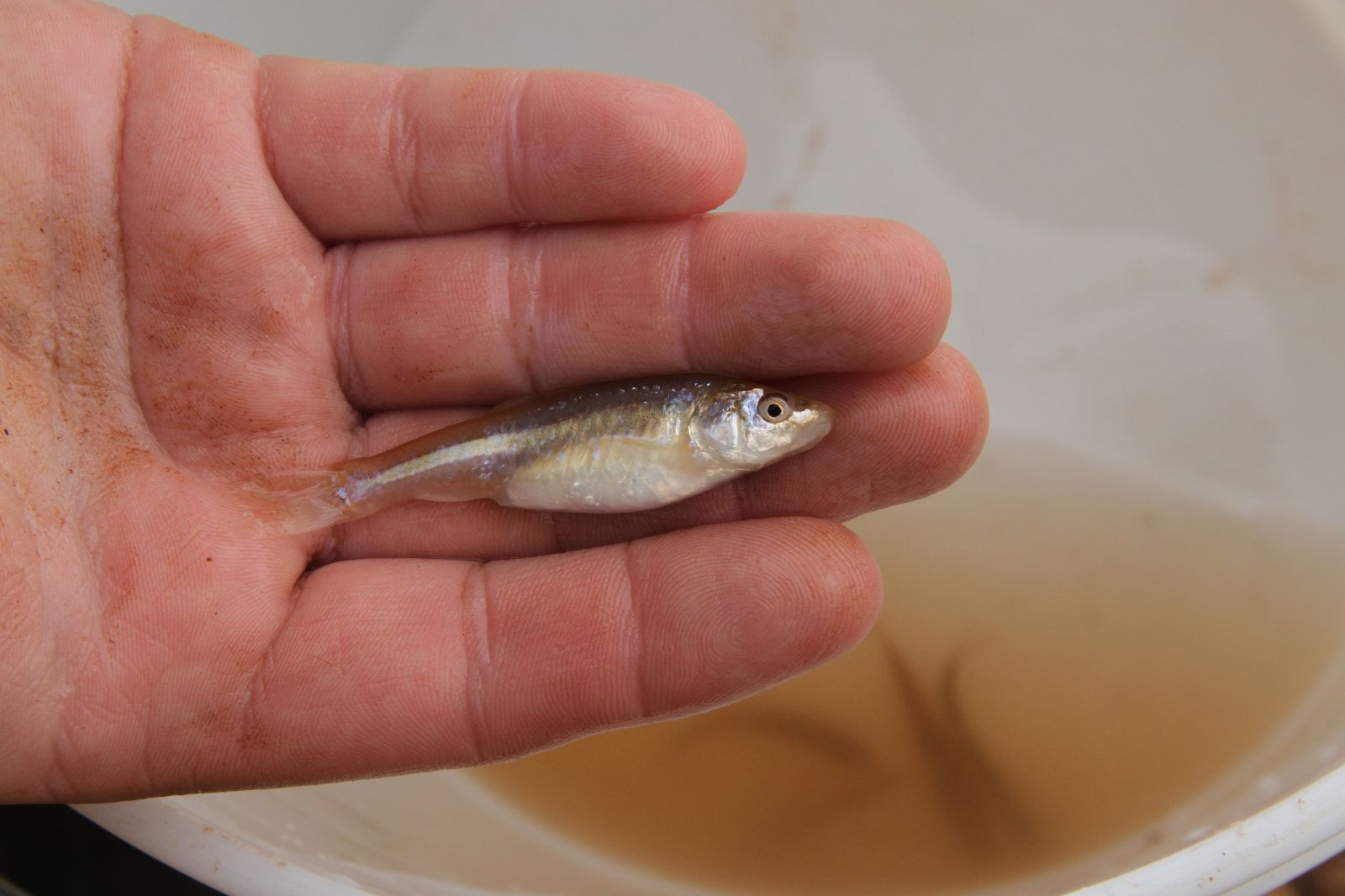
Smalleye shiner, threatened by the proposed Post Reservoir

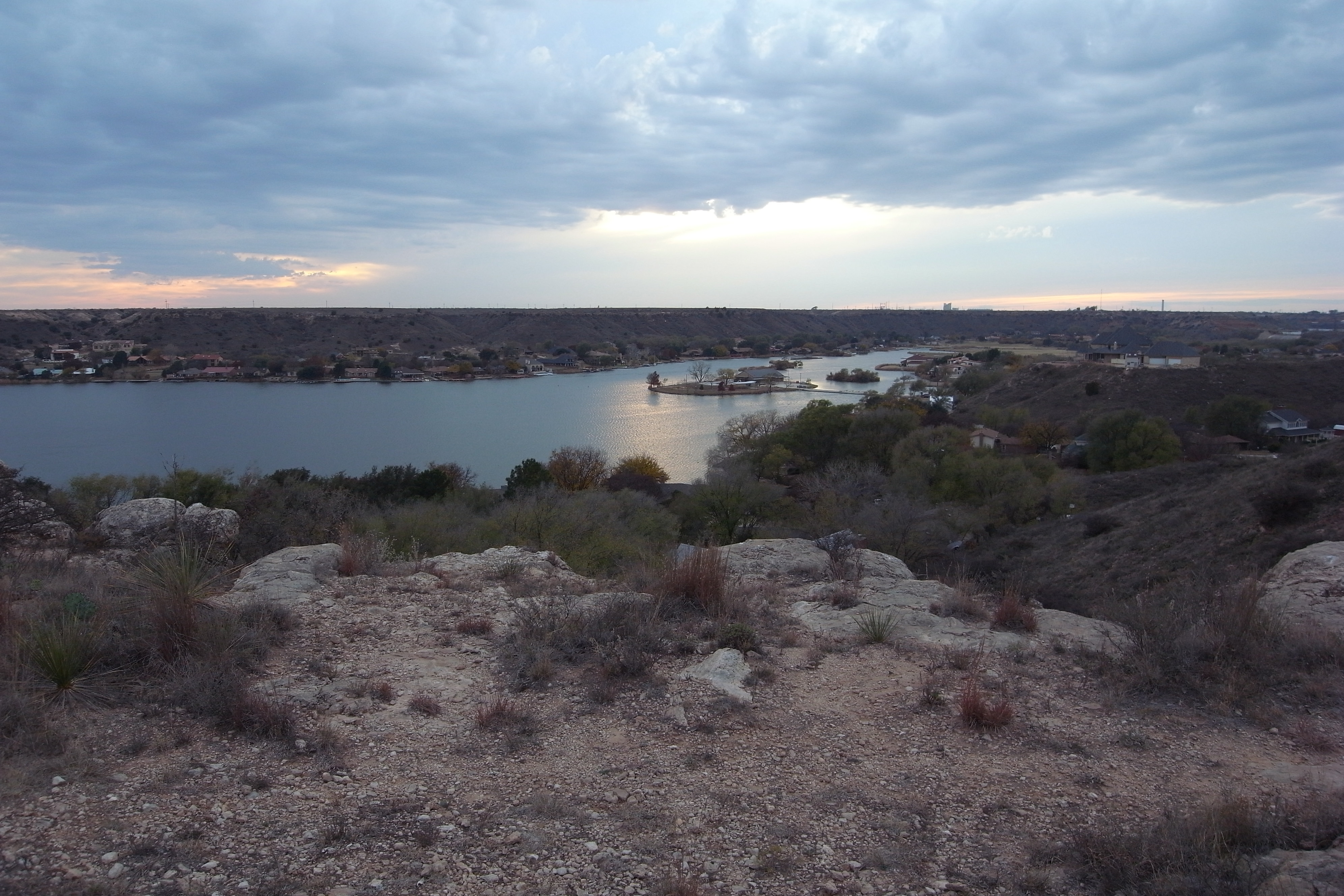
Lake Ransom Canyon, impounds waters on the upper North Fork.

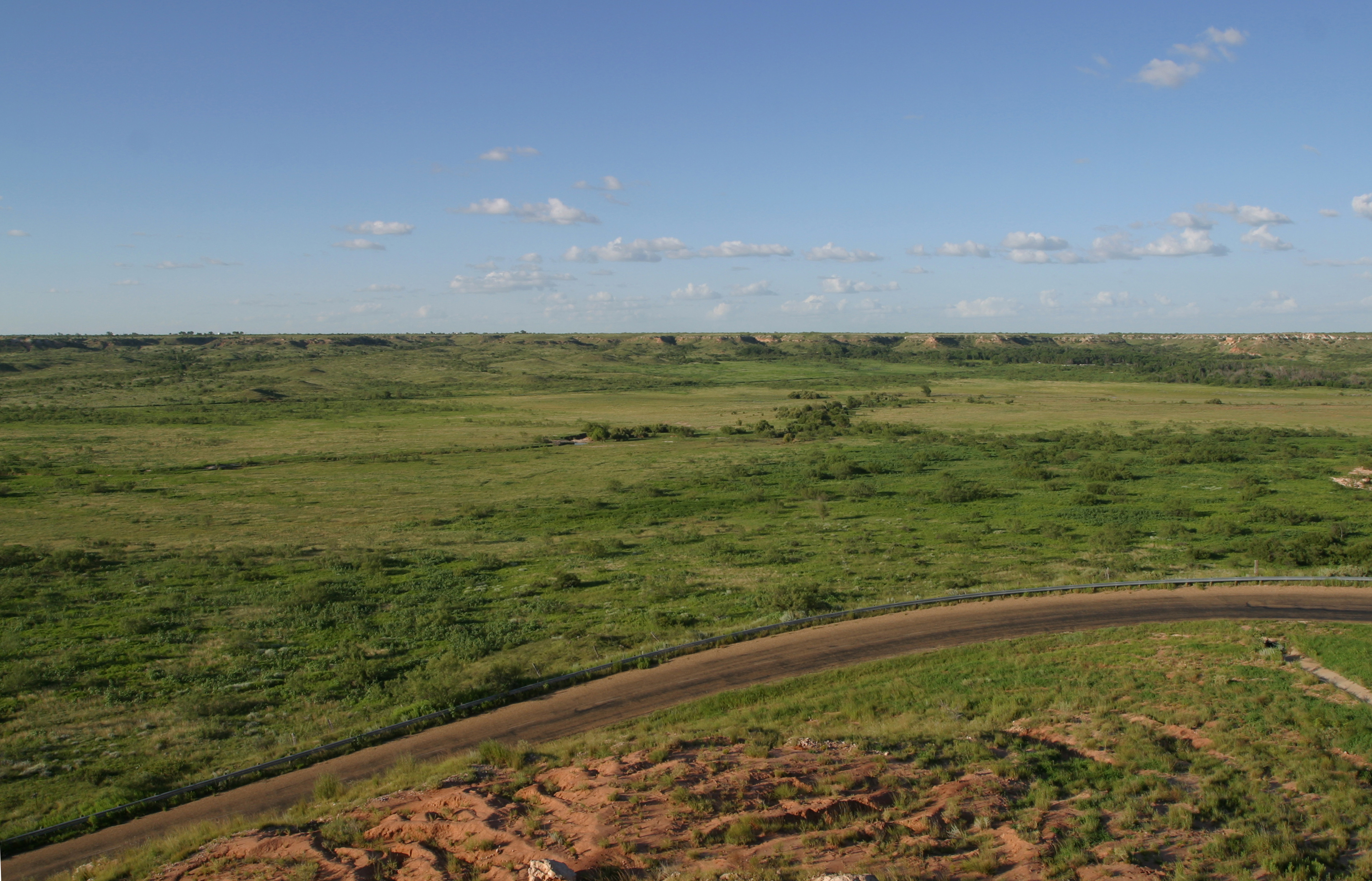
Yellow House Canyon, carved by the North Fork, near Slaton, Texas

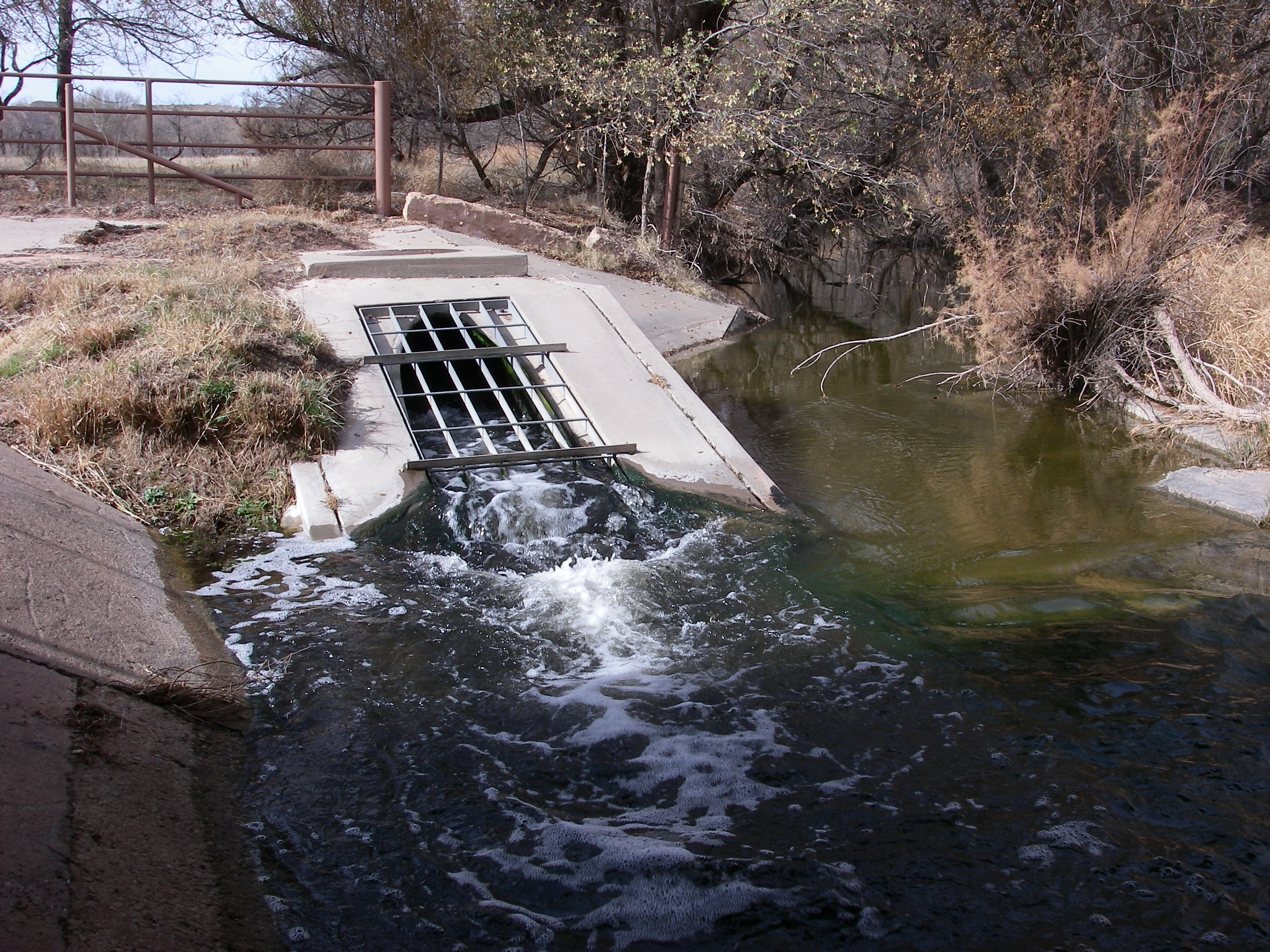
Outfall 001, where Lubbock discharges treated sewage into the North Fork

== See also ==
- Battle of Yellow House Canyon
- Blanco Canyon
- Caprock Escarpment
- Duffy's Peak
- List of rivers of Texas
- Mushaway Peak
- Robert R. Bruno Jr.
- Salt Fork Brazos River
- White River (Texas)
- Yellow House Draw
