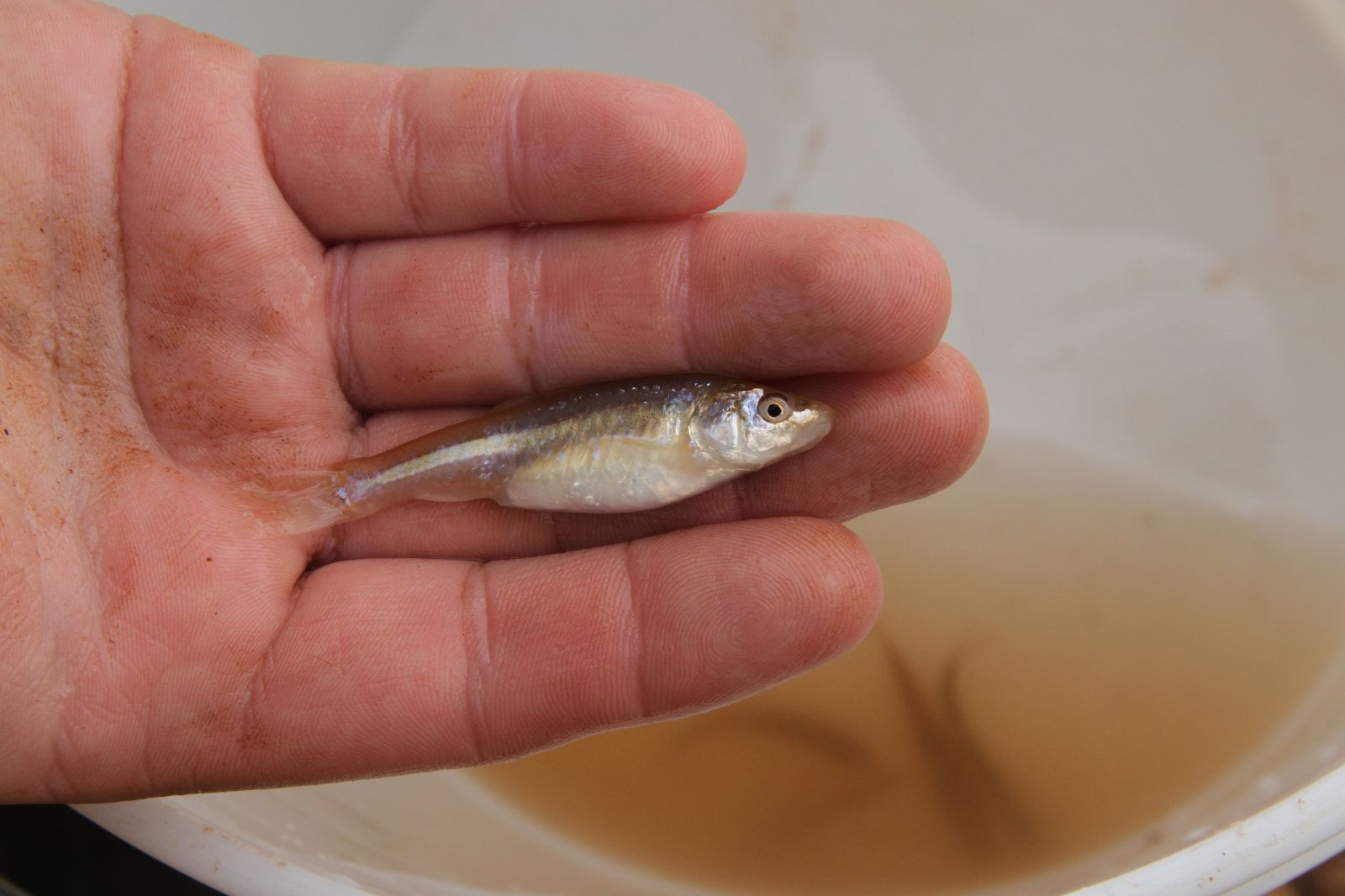

Conservation status
- Vulnerable (IUCN 3.1)

Scientific classification
- Kingdom: Animalia
- Phylum: Chordata
- Class: Actinopterygii
- Division: Teleostei
- Order: Cypriniformes
- Family: Leuciscidae
- Subfamily: Pogonichthyinae
- Genus: Notropis
- Species: N. buccula

Binomial name
- Notropis buccula F. B. Cross, 1953

= Smalleye shiner =

Species of fish

The smalleye shiner (Notropis buccula) is a species of freshwater ray-finned fish in the family Leuciscidae, the shiners, daces and minnows. It is found only in the upper Brazos River basin of Texas, which includes the Double Mountain and Salt forks of the upper Brazos. It became a candidate for federal listing as an endangered species of the United States in 2013.

== See also ==
- Double Mountain Fork Brazos River
- North Fork Double Mountain Fork Brazos River
- Salt Fork Brazos River
- Sharpnose shiner
