= Yellow House Draw =

River in the United States of America

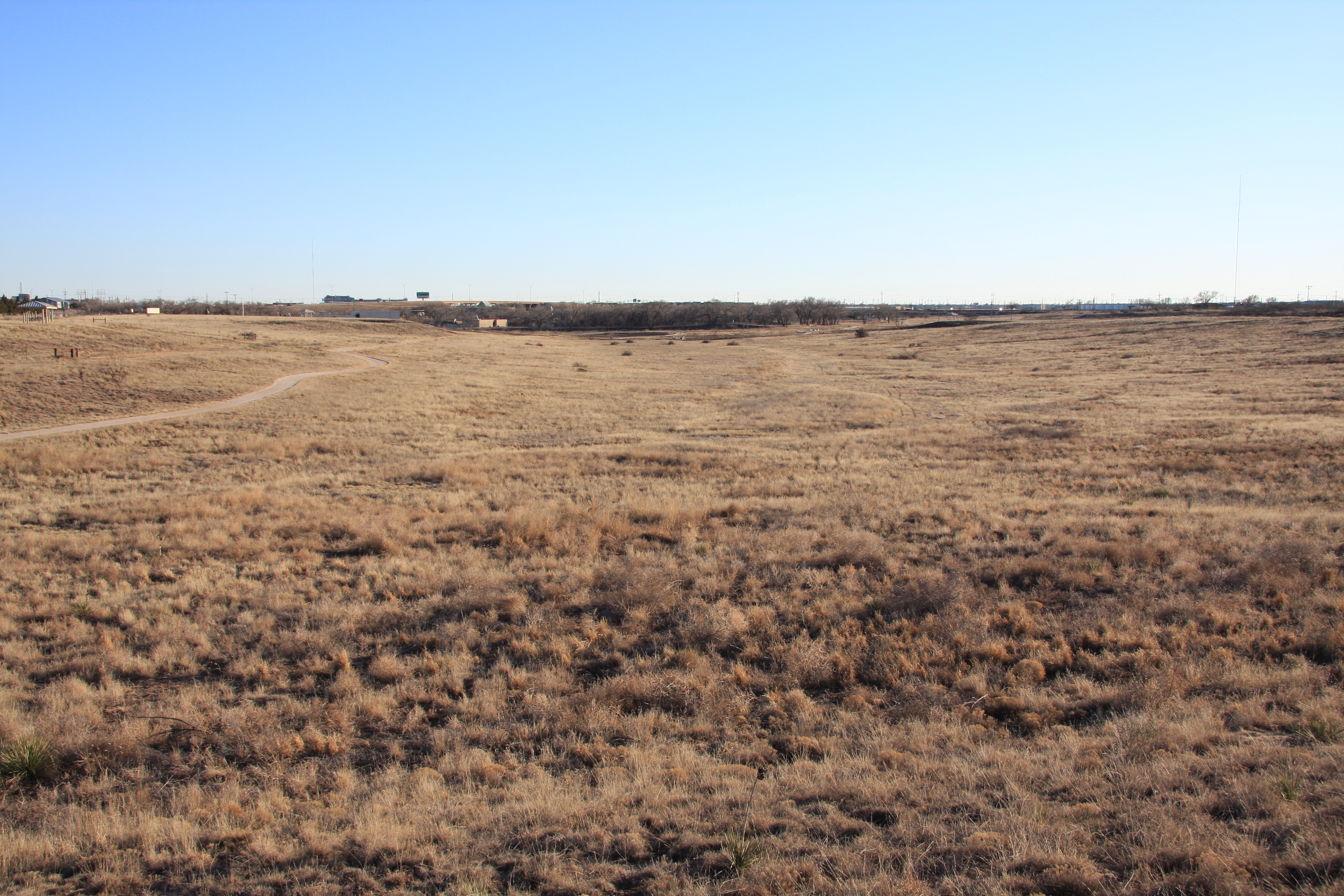
- Yellow House Draw – a dry remnant of a wetter past

- Location within Texas Location within the United States
- Length: 130 kilometres (81 mi)
- Area: 9,790 square kilometres (3,780 sq mi)

Geography
- Location: United States, Texas, Llano Estacado
- Coordinates: 33°35′34″N 101°50′02″W
- Interactive map of Yellow House Draw

Yellow House Draw is an ephemeral watercourse about 236 km (147 mi) long, heading about 20 km (12 mi) southwest of Melrose, New Mexico, and tending generally east-southeastward across the Llano Estacado to the city of Lubbock, where it joins Blackwater Draw to form Yellow House Canyon at the head of the North Fork Double Mountain Fork Brazos River. It stretches across Roosevelt, Curry, Bailey, Cochran, Hockley, and Lubbock Counties of eastern New Mexico and West Texas, and drains an area of 9,790 km^{2} (3,780 sq mi).

== Lubbock Lake Landmark ==
Lubbock Lake Landmark, an important archeological site and natural history preserve, is located in a meander of Yellow House Draw in the city of Lubbock, Texas. Native Americans and early settlers of the Llano Estacado used the springs in the draw until they went dry in the early 1930s due to excessive pumping of the Ogallala Aquifer. In 1936, the City of Lubbock dredged the meander in an effort to make it a usable water supply. These efforts were unsuccessful, but brought to light the archeological significance of the site. Today, very little standing water remains and no actual lake is there, but the site has become an important archeological landmark.

== Canyon Lakes ==
Also within the city limits of Lubbock, the parks department has constructed a series of narrow lakes partly within Yellow House Draw and partly within Yellow House Canyon, collectively known as Jim Bertram Canyon Lakes System consisting of six lakes from northwest to southeast - Conquistador Lake, Llano Estacado Lake, Comancheria Lake, Vaquero Lake, Canyon Lake, and Dunbar Historical Lake. Vaquero Lake and Canyon Lake lie within Mackenzie Park and at Vaquero Lake, Blackwater Draw and Yellowhouse Draw converge. The Canyon Lakes offer scenic views and recreational opportunities, and they also function as an essential part of Lubbock's wastewater disposal system. First, the city applies treated wastewater to crops at the Lubbock Land Application Site – a 6,000-acre (24 km^{2}) site located east of the City of Lubbock. Here, 31 center-pivot sprinkler systems are used to irrigate crops with 13 million gallons of treated effluent per day. The soils and sediments of the Land Application Site act as filters as the treated wastewater percolates through the soil. To minimize contamination of the Ogallala Aquifer, groundwater is then pumped from beneath the Land Application Site to Canyon Lakes, where the water flows from one lake to the next and eventually into Yellow House Canyon, forming the North Fork Double Mountain Fork Brazos River.

== See also ==
- List of rivers of Texas
