= Roosevelt Independent School District =

School district in Texas

Roosevelt Independent School District is a small, innovative, public independent school district (ISD) located 8 1/2 miles east of Lubbock, Texas, United States.

The ISD serves the unincorporated communities of Acuff and Roosevelt, along with the northern portions of the incorporated towns of Buffalo Springs and Ransom Canyon. A small portion of Lubbock lies within the district.

Roosevelt ISD has three schools:

- Roosevelt High School (grades 9-12)
- Roosevelt Junior High (grades 6-8)
- Roosevelt Elementary (prekindergarten-grade 5).

In 2009, the ISD was rated "recognized" by the Texas Education Agency.
