= Yellow House Canyon =

Valley in Texas, United States

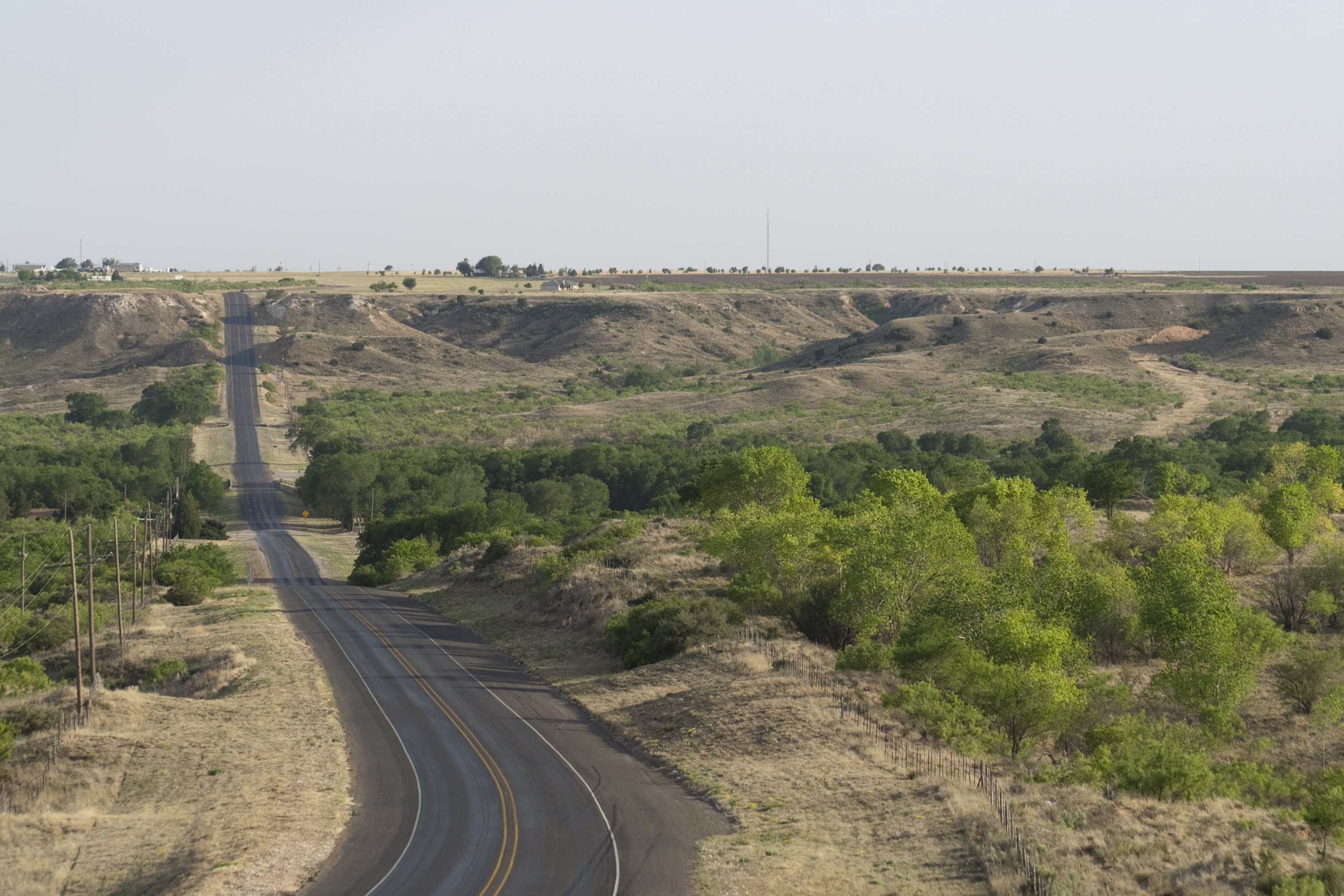
- Farm to Market Road 400 passing through Yellow House Canyon

- Location within Texas Location within the United States
- Length: 32 kilometres (20 mi)

Geography
- Location: United States, Texas
- Coordinates: 33.4556°N 101.536°W
- Rivers: North Fork Double Mountain Fork Brazos River
- Interactive map of Yellow House Canyon

Yellow House Canyon is about 32 km (20 mi) long, heading in Lubbock, Texas, at the junction of Blackwater Draw and Yellow House Draw, and trending generally southeastward to the edge of the Llano Estacado about 10 km (6.2 mi) east of Slaton, Texas; it forms one of three major canyons along the east side of the Llano Estacado and carries the waters of the North Fork Double Mountain Fork Brazos River.

The name has an XIT Ranch heritage, according to Gary and Margaret Kraisinger, in that "the yellow cliffs which from a distance resembled houses with open doors."

Within the city limits of Lubbock Yellow House Canyon remains a narrow and shallow channel with a typical width of less than 0.5 km (0.31 mi) and a typical depth of not more than 20 m (66 ft). The city of Lubbock has constructed a series of small dams forming several narrow lakes, collectively known as Canyon Lakes. The Canyon Lakes Park offers conservation areas and recreational opportunities on the water and in the narrow park along the water's edge.

Beyond the city limits of Lubbock, the canyon gradually widens and deepens. Around 15 km (9.3 mi) to the east-southeast a dam was constructed to form Buffalo Springs Lake, a recreational lake inundating the main springs; however, the springs continue to flow beneath the waters of the lake. Immediately downstream of Buffalo Springs Lake is a much smaller dam forming another recreational lake named Lake Ransom Canyon, with numerous single-family homes surrounding the lake as the community of Ransom Canyon, Texas.

Downstream of Ransom Canyon, the North Fork is finally allowed to flow freely across sparsely populated ranchland as the canyon continues to deepen and widen. Texas Farm to Market Road 400 crosses at a point where the canyon is nearly 3 km (1.9 mi) wide and 60 m (200 ft) deep. Further downstream, near the confluence of Plum Creek and the North Fork, the walls of the canyon begin to curve sharply outward as the North Fork Double Mountain Fork Brazos River flows out of the canyon and onto the rolling plains of West Texas.

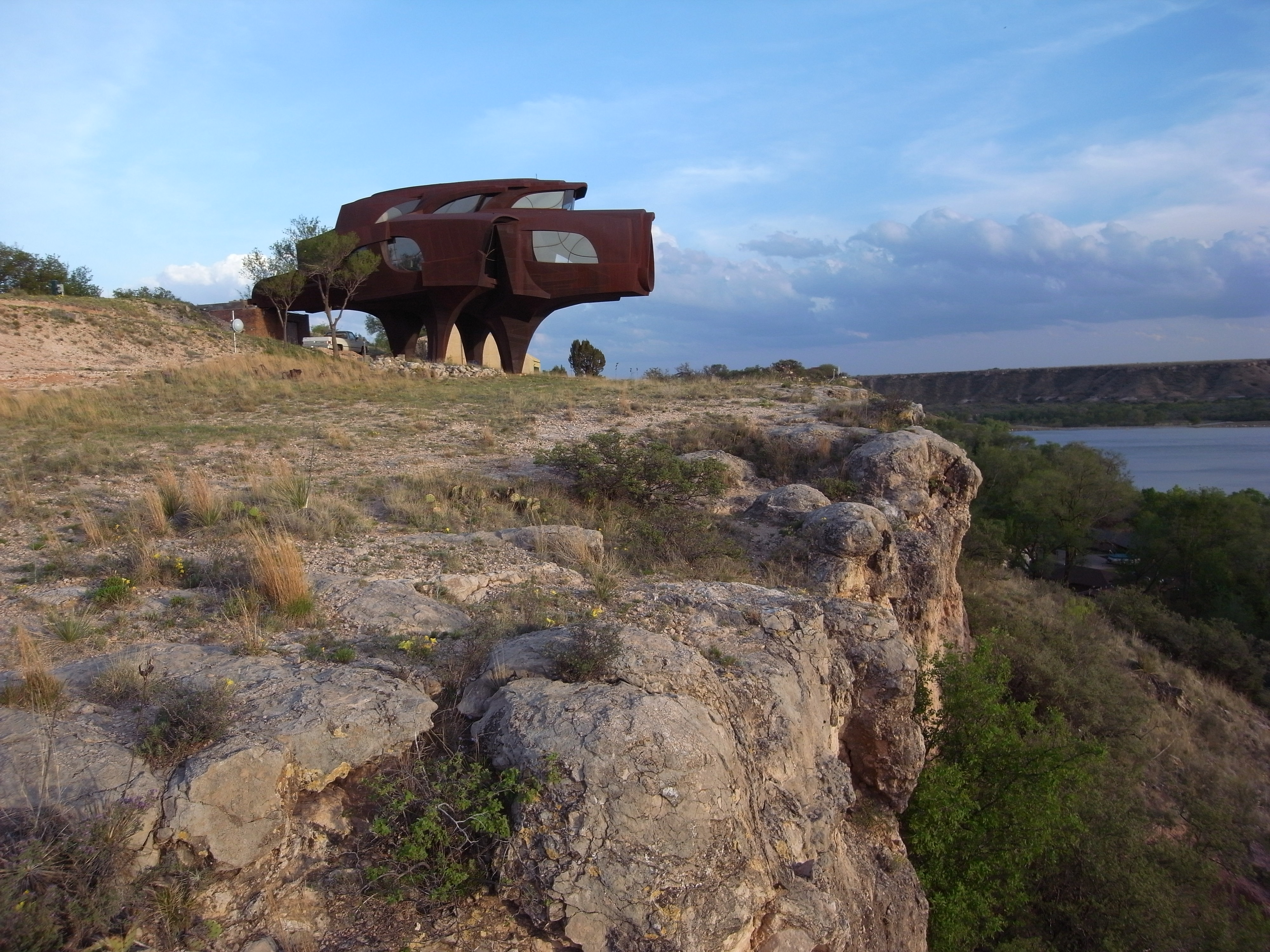
Robert Bruno's steel house, standing on the rim of Yellow House Canyon

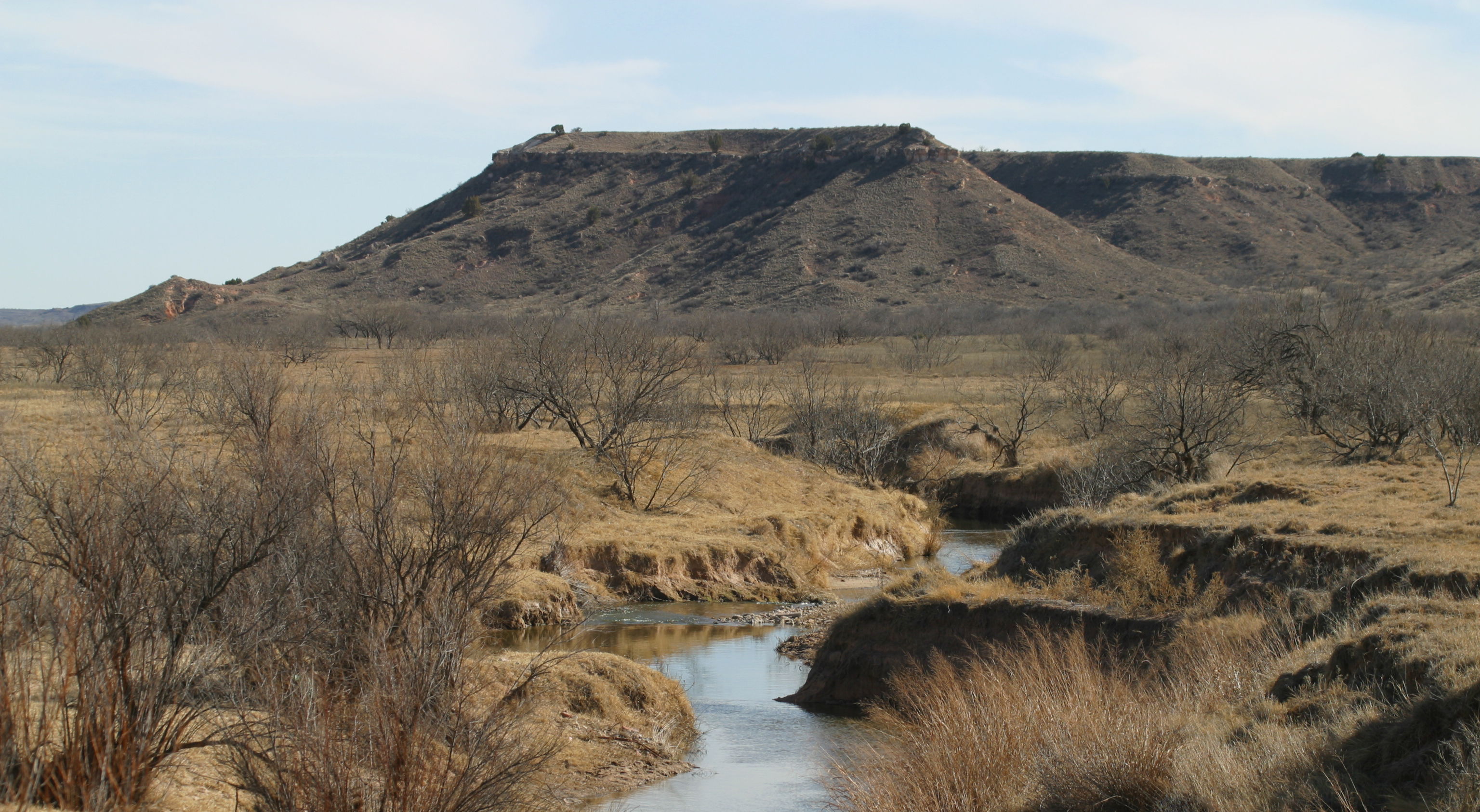
North Fork Double Mountain Fork Brazos River flowing through Yellow House Canyon

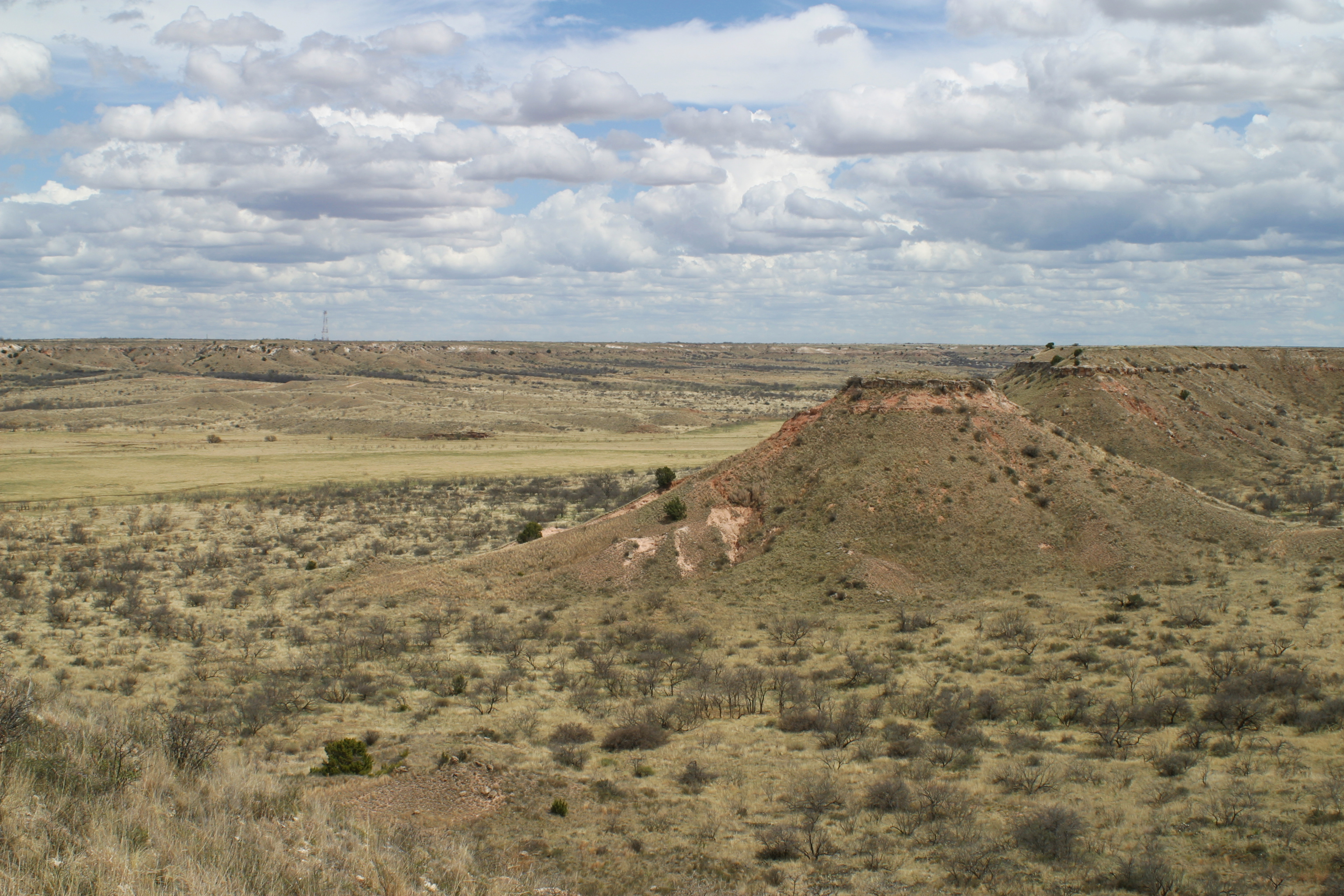
Erosional remnants of the Llano Estacado in Yellow House Canyon

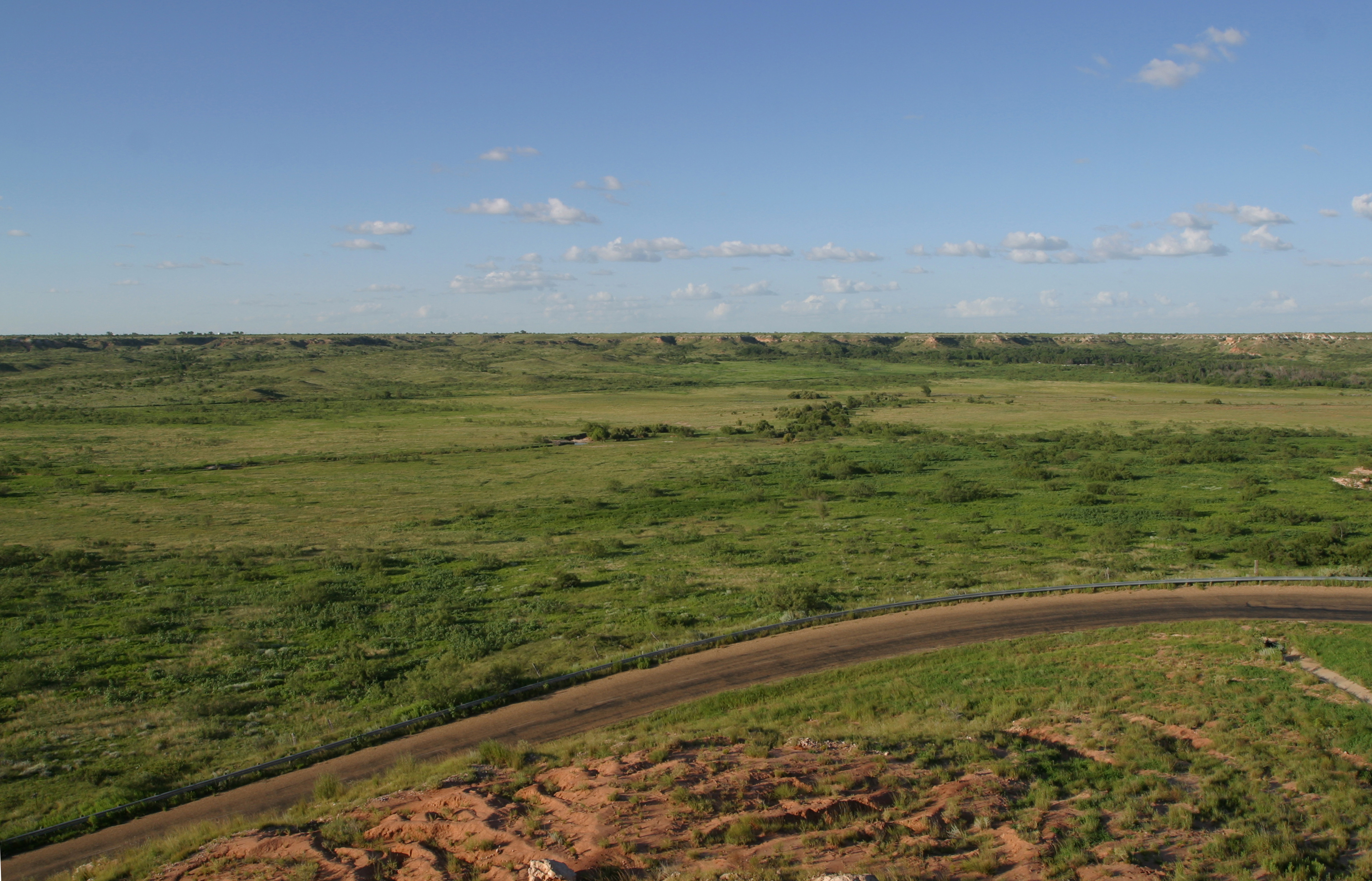
Yellow House Canyon near Slaton, Texas

== See also ==
- Battle of Yellow House Canyon
- Blanco Canyon
- Canyon Valley, Texas
- Caprock Canyons State Park and Trailway
- Caprock Escarpment
- Double Mountain Fork Brazos River
- List of rivers of Texas
- Palo Duro Canyon
- Ransom Canyon
- Robert R. Bruno Jr.
- White River (Texas)
- Yellow House Draw
