= White River (Texas) =

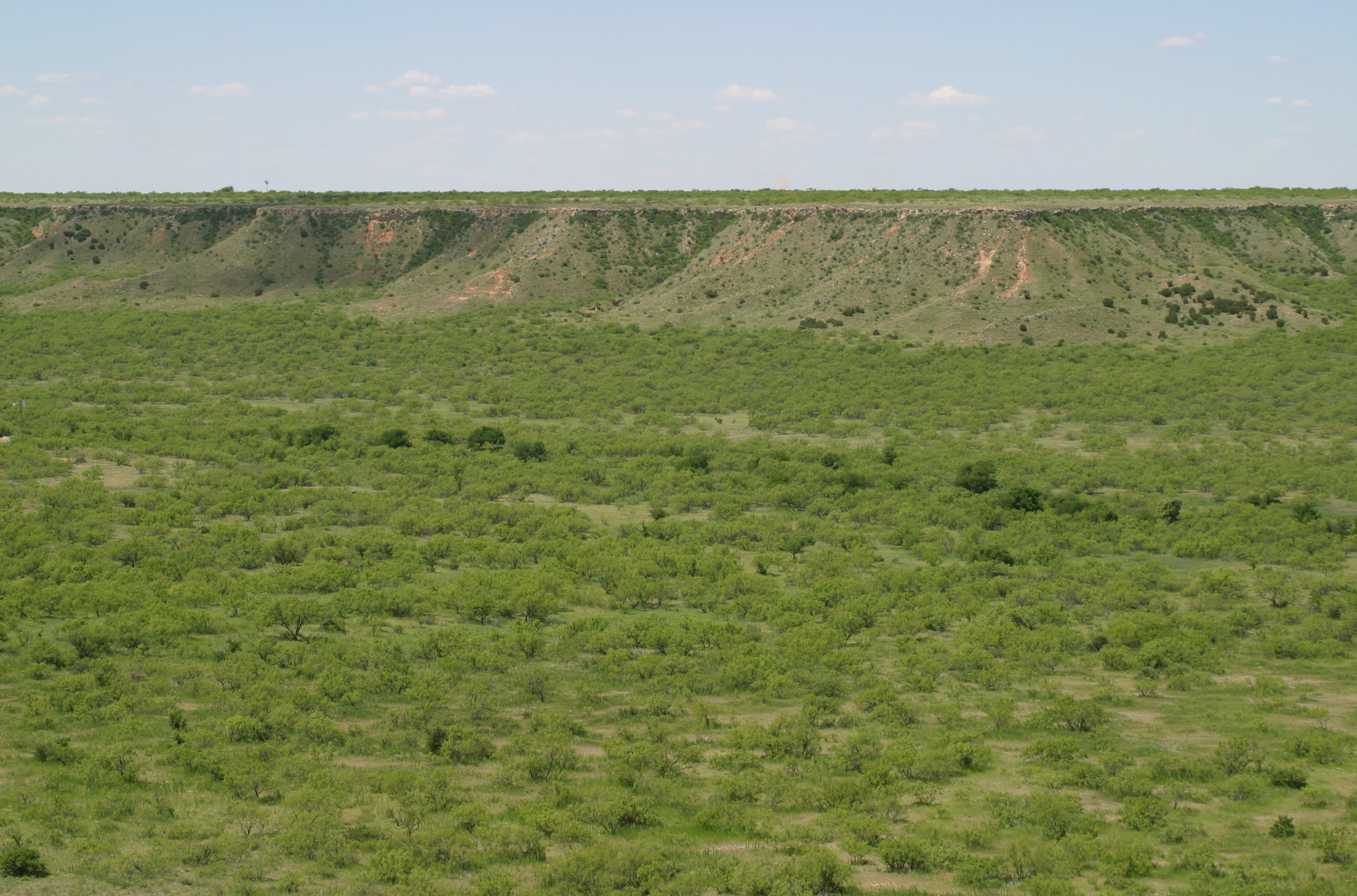
- Blanco Canyon carved by the White River

Location
- Country: United States
- State: Texas

Physical characteristics
- Source: Callahan/Runningwater Draw
  - location: Floyd County, Texas
  - coordinates: 33°58′44″N 101°29′28″W
  - elevation: 973 m (3,192 ft)
- Mouth: Salt Fork Brazos River
  - location: Kent County, Texas
  - coordinates: 33°14′28″N 100°56′10″W
  - elevation: 636 m (2,087 ft)
- Length: 100 km (62 mi)
- Basin size: 4,377 km^{2} (1,690 sq mi)

The White River is an intermittent stream in the South Plains of Texas and a tributary of the Brazos River of the United States. It rises 8 miles (13 km) west of Floydada in southwestern Floyd County at the confluence of Callahan Draw and Running Water Draw. From there, it runs southeast for 62 miles (100 km) to its mouth on the Salt Fork Brazos River in northwestern Kent County. Besides these two headwaters, which rise near Hale Center and in Curry County, New Mexico, respectively, other tributaries include Pete, Crawfish, and Davidson Creeks. The White River drains an area of 1,690 sq mi (4,377 km^{2}).

The river runs through Blanco Canyon, which it carved as it descends from the Llano Estacado. On October 9, 1871, Col. Ranald S. Mackenzie fought Quanah Parker in the Battle of Blanco Canyon on the river.

South of the canyon, in far southeastern Crosby County, it was dammed in 1963 to create a lake, the White River Reservoir, which provides water for the towns of Post, Spur, Crosbyton, and Ralls.

The river was known to Spanish hunters and traders in eastern New Mexico long before Anglo settlers arrived; the Spanish named the river Blanco (Spanish word for "white"), which it shares with the canyon and which has been anglicized to the present name. The river has also been called the "Blanco Fork of Brazos River" or the "White Fork of Brazos River".

Local anecdotes suggest the river level has been steadily declining due to local pumping and depletion of the Ogallala Aquifer: "you could catch fish in it until 1955.... Today, the water is 80 feet down."

== Silver Falls ==
Where U.S. Route 82 crosses the White River, a roadside rest area with facilities and hiking trails is maintained by the Texas Department of Transportation. The central focal point of this park is Silver Falls, where a spring-fed White River used to cascade over sandstone ledges. Springs that once flowed into the White River issued from the Ogallala Aquifer, which has been heavily tapped by the numerous farming operations on the Llano Estacado. According to annual depth to water level measurements obtained by the High Plains Underground Water District, the water table beneath the Llano Estacado has declined at a rate of 0.8 ft (0.2 m) per year over the last decade. Over the 20-year period from 1987 to 2007, the water table dropped a total of 18.6 ft (5.7 m) across the district. As a result of this depletion, the once-gushing springs along this stretch of the White River have either dried completely or have been reduced to seeps. Lacking a steady base flow, the White River has ceased to flow, and today, Silver Falls is normally dry unless a strong thunderstorm happens to pass across the watershed.

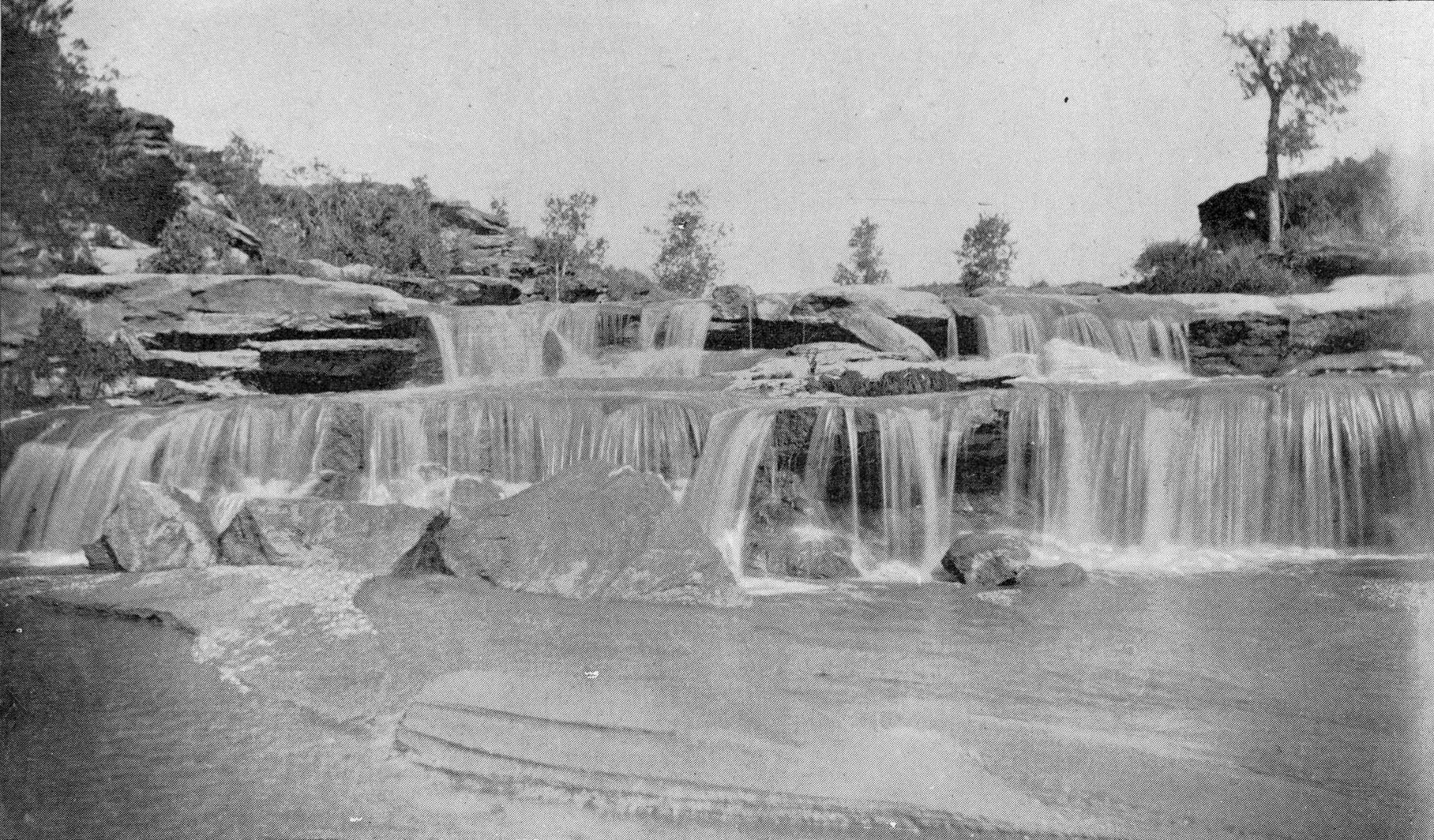
A spring-fed White River flowing across Silver Falls in 1891

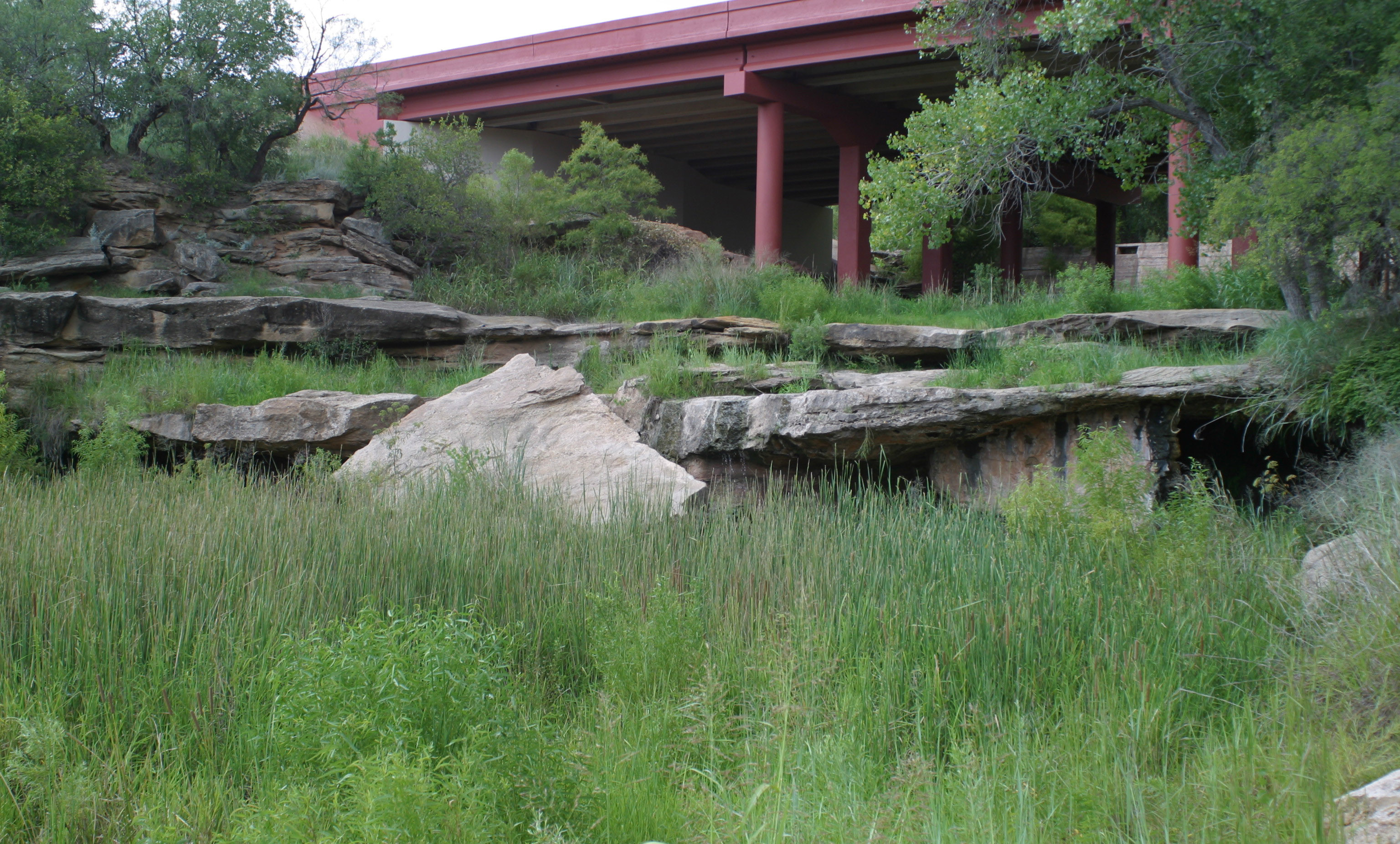
Due to agricultural pumping and resulting depletion of the Ogallala Aquifer, the White River no longer maintains a spring-fed base flow, and today, Silver Falls is often dry and overgrown by vegetation.

== Proper name ==
The White River has been known by various names in the past. Alternate names include the Freshwater Fork, Blanco Fork, or White Fork of the Brazos River and Rio Blanco. According to a 1964 decision by the United States Board on Geographical Names, the proper name for this ephemeral stream is the White River.

== See also ==
- List of rivers of Texas
- Mount Blanco
- Yellow House Canyon
- Double Mountain Fork Brazos River
- North Fork Double Mountain Fork Brazos River
