= Buffalo Springs, Texas =

Village in Lubbock County, Texas, United States

- Village
- Interactive map of Buffalo Springs, Texas
- Coordinates: 33°31′55″N 101°42′30″W
- Country: United States
- State: Texas
- County: Lubbock

Area
  - Total: 1.91 sq mi (4.94 km^{2})
  - Land: 1.51 sq mi (3.91 km^{2})
  - Water: 0.40 sq mi (1.03 km^{2})
- Elevation: 3,022 ft (921 m)

Population (2020)
  - Total: 468
  - Density: 310/sq mi (120/km^{2})
- Time zone: UTC-6 (Central (CST))
  - Summer (DST): UTC-5 (CDT)
- FIPS code: 48-11155
- GNIS feature ID: 2413536

Buffalo Springs (also known as Buffalo Springs Lake) is a village in Lubbock County, Texas, United States. The population was 468 at the 2020 census. It is part of the Lubbock Metropolitan Statistical Area.

== Geography ==
The community surrounds Buffalo Springs Lake (a reservoir on the North Fork Double Mountain Fork Brazos River), southeast of Lubbock, in the Llano Estacado.

According to the United States Census Bureau, the village has a total area of 1.9 square miles (5.0 km^{2}), of which 1.5 square miles (4.0 km^{2}) is land and 0.39 square miles (1.0 km^{2}), or 20.73%, is water.

== Demographics ==
Historical population
Census	Pop.	Note	%±
2000	493		—
2010	453		−8.1%
2020	468		3.3%
U.S. Decennial Census

=== 2020 census ===
Buffalo Springs racial composition (NH = Non-Hispanic) (Note: Note: the US Census treats Hispanic/Latino as an ethnic category. This table excludes Latinos from the racial categories and assigns them to a separate category. Hispanics/Latinos can be of any race.)
Race	Number	Percentage
White (NH)	392	83.76%
Black or African American (NH)	1	0.21%
Some Other Race (NH)	1	0.21%
Mixed/Multi-Racial (NH)	17	3.63%
Hispanic or Latino	57	12.18%
Total	468	

As of the 2020 United States census, there were 468 people, 247 households, and 164 families residing in the village.

=== 2000 census ===
As of the census of 2000, there were 493 people, 227 households, and 143 families residing in the village. The population density was 312.9 inhabitants per square mile (120.8/km^{2}). There were 303 housing units at an average density of 192.3 per square mile (74.2/km^{2}). The racial makeup of the village was 94.93% White, 0.61% African American, 0.61% Native American, 2.64% from other races, and 1.22% from two or more races. Hispanic or Latino of any race were 5.48% of the population.

There were 227 households, out of which 20.7% had children under the age of 18 living with them, 54.2% were married couples living together, 5.3% had a female householder with no husband present, and 37.0% were non-families. 30.0% of all households were made up of individuals, and 8.4% had someone living alone who was 65 years of age or older. The average household size was 2.17 and the average family size was 2.67.

In the village, the population was spread out, with 18.1% under the age of 18, 5.5% from 18 to 24, 26.6% from 25 to 44, 34.7% from 45 to 64, and 15.2% who were 65 years of age or older. The median age was 45 years. For every 100 females, there were 108.0 males. For every 100 females age 18 and over, there were 106.1 males.

The median income for a household in the village was $36,389, and the median income for a family was $40,500. Males had a median income of $27,404 versus $23,500 for females. The per capita income for the village was $19,488. About 3.1% of families and 6.9% of the population were below the poverty line, including 7.8% of those under age 18 and 3.7% of those age 65 or over.

== Education ==
Buffalo Springs is served by the Roosevelt Independent School District.

== See also ==
- List of municipalities in Texas
