= Double Mountain Fork Brazos River =

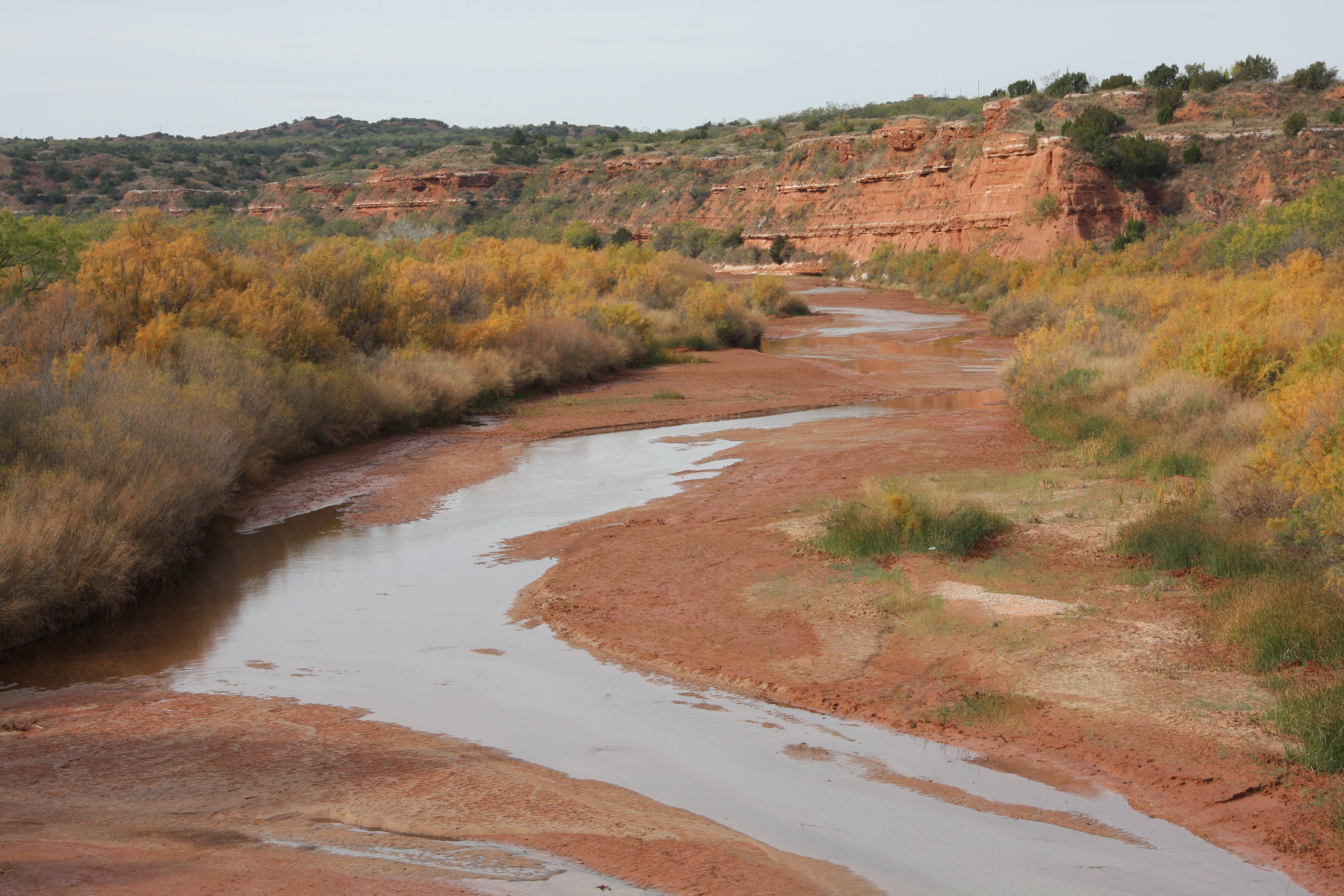
- Double Mountain Fork, Fisher County, Texas

Location
- Country: United States
- State: Texas

Physical characteristics
- Source: Llano Estacado, 18.5 km southeast of Tahoka, Texas
  - location: Lynn County, Texas
  - coordinates: 33°03′19″N 101°38′17″W
  - elevation: 890 m (2,920 ft)
- Mouth: Confluence Double Mountain / Salt Fork
  - location: Stonewall County, Texas
  - coordinates: 33°16′03″N 100°00′38″W
  - elevation: 451 m (1,480 ft)
- Length: 280 km (170 mi)
- Basin size: 7,097 km^{2} (2,740 sq mi)

The Double Mountain Fork Brazos River is an ephemeral, sandy-braided stream about 170 mi (280 km) long, heading on the Llano Estacado of West Texas about 11.5 mi (18.5 km) southeast of Tahoka, Texas, flowing east-northeast across the western Rolling Plains to join the Salt Fork, forming the Brazos River about 18 mi (29 km) west-northwest of Haskell, Texas.

== Geography ==
The Double Mountain Fork Brazos River begins as a shallow draw near the eastern edge of the Llano Estacado in Lynn County, about 3.1 mi (5 km) northeast of the small farming community of Draw, Texas. The stream generally runs eastward across southern Garza County, where it is fed by springs, providing a minimal base flow that is intermittently punctuated by rainfall and associated runoff. At the western edge of Kent County, about 12 mi (20 km) east-northeast of Justiceburg, the Double Mountain Fork merges with the North Fork. The Double Mountain Fork then continues eastward across southern Kent County, northwestern Fisher County, and into southern Stonewall County, where it passes to the south of Double Mountains, a pair of flat-topped hills located 13 mi (21 km) southwest of Aspermont, Texas. Double Mountains form part of the high ground dividing the watersheds of the Salt Fork to the north and the Double Mountain Fork to the south. To the east of Double Mountains, the Double Mountain Fork flows into western Haskell County before turning north and back westward into eastern Stonewall County, where it merges with the Salt Fork to form the Brazos River (proper), northeast of Aspermont, Texas.

== Proper name ==
According to a 1964 decision by the United States Board on Geographical Names, this tributary of the Brazos is properly called the "Double Mountain Fork Brazos River", and should not be called the "Double Mountain Fork of the Brazos River" nor the "Double Mountain Fork of Brazos River". This stream is often mistakenly referred to as the "South Fork of the Double Mountain Fork of the Brazos River." Perhaps this is an attempt to distinguish this stream from the North Fork Double Mountain Fork Brazos River, a tributary of the Double Mountain Fork. The stream described here, however, is the main stem of the Double Mountain Fork Brazos River and, therefore, it is not a tributary of the Double Mountain Fork, rather it is a tributary of the Brazos River.

== See also ==
- Blanco Canyon
- Brazos Wind Farm
- Caprock Escarpment
- Colorado River
- Double Mountains
- Duffy's Peak
- Farm to Market Road 400
- Farm to Market Road 669
- List of rivers of Texas
- Mushaway Peak
- North Fork Double Mountain Fork Brazos River
- Prairie Dog Town Fork Red River
- Salt Fork Brazos River
- Yellow House Canyon
- White River (Texas)
