= Blanco Canyon =

Canyon in Texas, United States

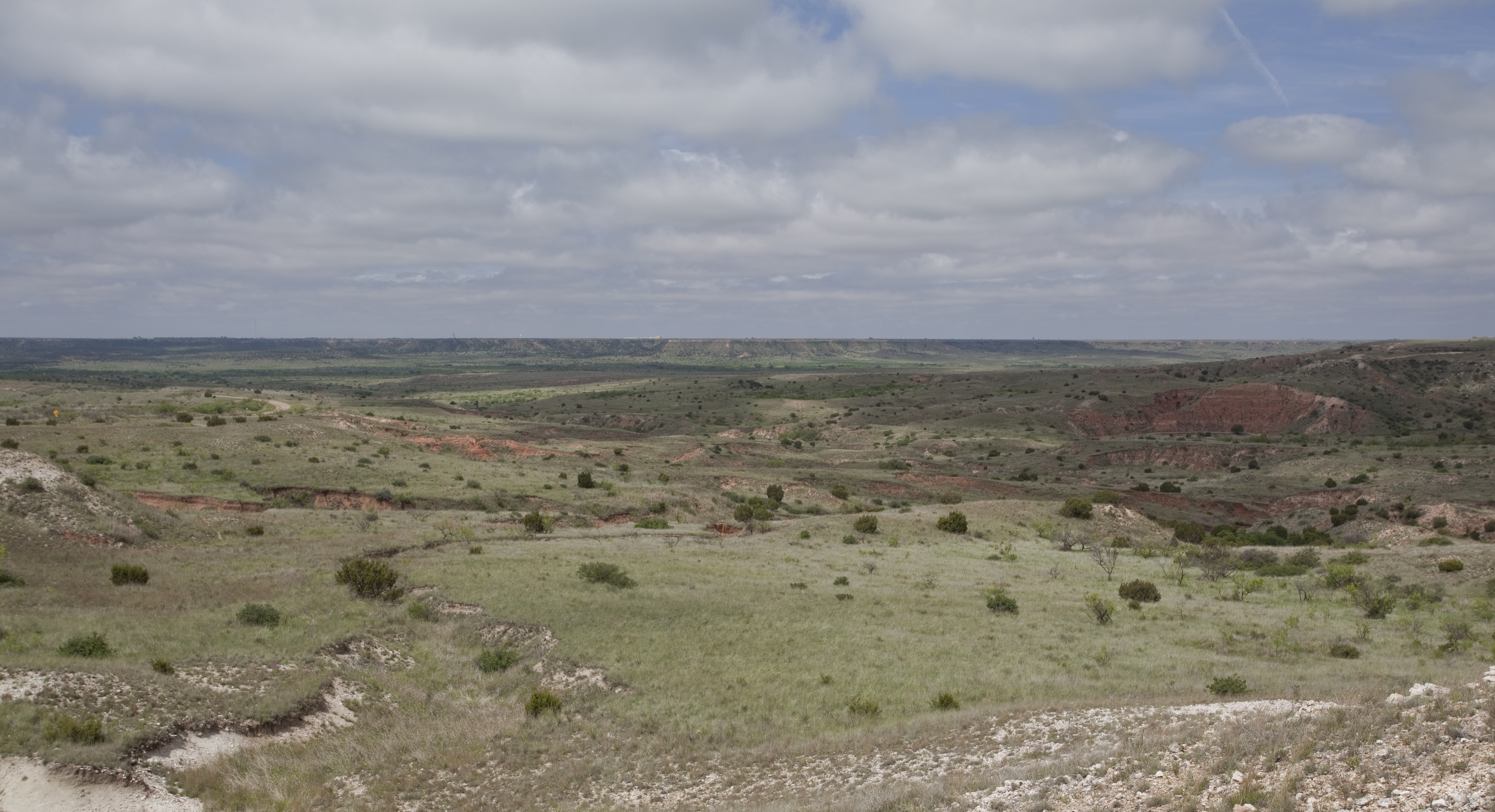
- View from the east side of Blanco Canyon

- Location within Texas
- Floor elevation: 2,667 ft (813 m)
- Length: 34 mi (55 km)
- Width: 10 mi (16 km)
- Depth: 500 ft (150 m)

Geography
- Coordinates: 33°39′57″N 101°09′38″W
- Traversed by: U.S. Highway 82
- Rivers: White River
- Interactive map of Blanco Canyon

Blanco Canyon is a canyon located in the U.S. state of Texas. Eroded by the White River into the Caprock Escarpment on the east side of the Llano Estacado, the canyon runs for 34 miles (55 km) in a southeasterly direction, gradually widening from its beginning in southwestern Floyd County to 10 miles (16 km) across at its mouth in southeastern Crosby County. It also gradually deepens from 50 feet (15 m) at its beginning to 300 to 500 feet (91 to 150 m) at its mouth. One side canyon, 5-mile long Crawfish Canyon, was cut by Crawfish Creek as it feeds into the White River from the west.

Blanco Canyon is one of several canyons that have been cut by rivers into the east face of the Llano Estacado, including Yellow House Canyon, Tule Canyon, and Palo Duro Canyon.

== History ==
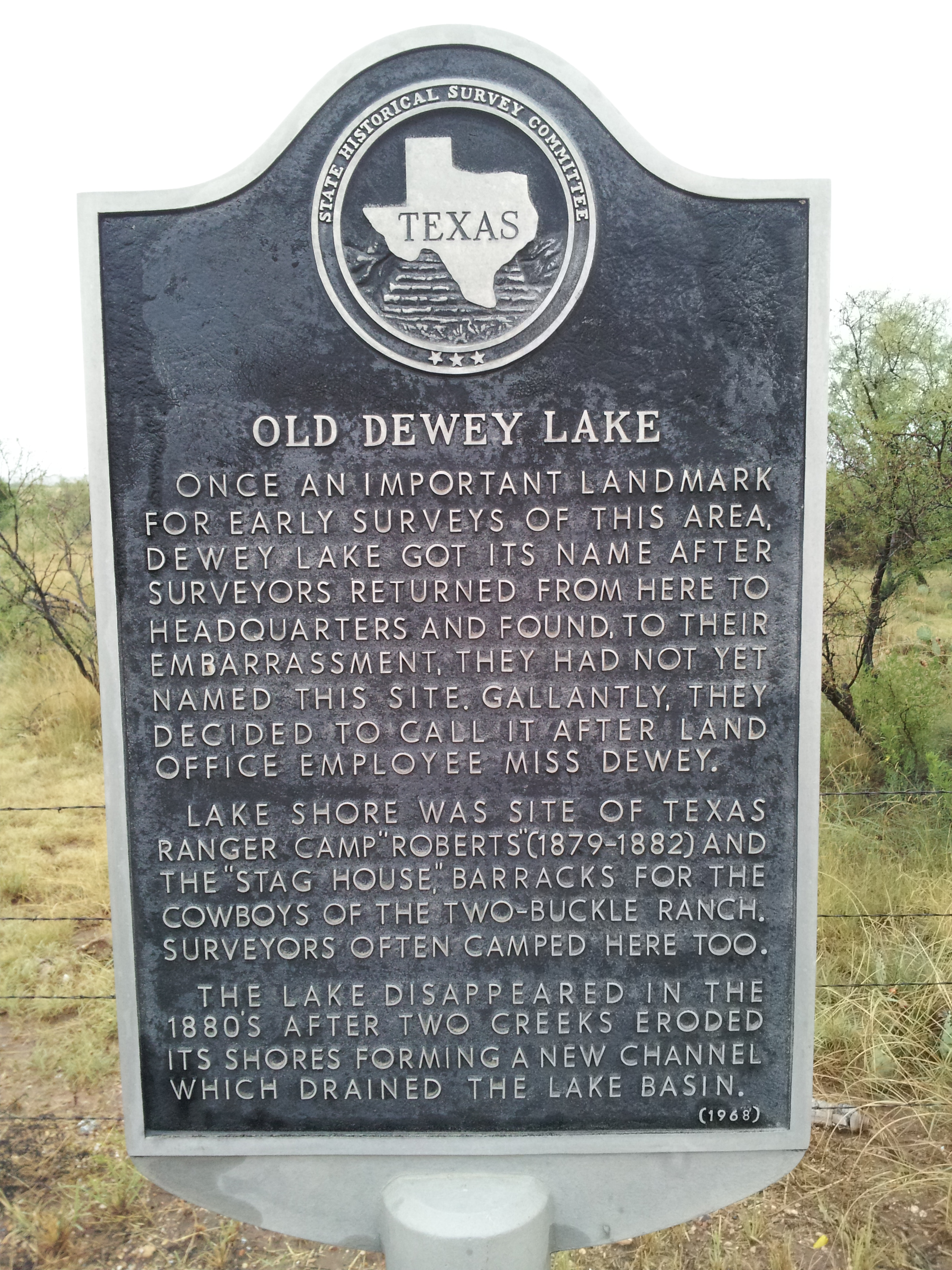
Texas Historical Marker on Highway 82, for Texas Ranger Camp Roberts

The canyon was long suspected, but only confirmed in the 1990s, of having been used as a campsite by Francisco Vásquez de Coronado and his army twice in spring of 1541 while on his El Dorado expedition. The water and timber afforded by the White River and the trees growing along its banks would have provided an ideal campsite in the 16th century. Indeed, although the river is mostly dry now due to pumping, local anecdotes maintain that fishing was possible in the river until the mid-20th century. The canyon valley still appears fertile, and cottonwood trees line the creek bed.

It was on October 10, 1871, also the site of the main skirmish of Col. Ranald S. Mackenzie's initial campaign against the Plains Comanches, known as the Battle of Blanco Canyon. On this same campaign, Mackenzie established a supply camp named Anderson's Fort on a curved ridge a short distance southeast of the canyon mouth; it is now on the National Register of Historic Places.

Shortly thereafter, once the Plains Indians had been forced onto reservations, the nearby site of Mount Blanco on the east rim of the canyon was established in 1877 by Henry Clay Smith and his wife, the former Elizabeth Boyle, as the first permanent white settlement on the West Texas plains, and the first post office west of Fort Griffin. Early settlers were attracted to the site for the same reason as Coronado had been - the ready supply of wood and water, which were rarities in the area.

In 1948, the District Nine of the Caprock-Plains Baptist churches established the Plains Baptist Assembly in the canyon as a recreational retreat for area churches. By 1986, the site encompassed 160 acres (0.65 km^{2}) and 65 buildings. Today, it runs year-round and features facilities for camps, retreats, and conferences.

Floydada's country club is also located in the canyon.

== Access ==
The canyon is crossed north-to-south by U.S. Highway 62 near the canyon's beginning, and east-to-west by Farm to Market Road 193 and U.S. Highway 82, the latter being near the canyon's mouth. Where U.S. 82 crosses the White River, a roadside park with facilities and hiking trails has been built.

== See also ==
- Blancan
- Duffy's Peak
- Farm to Market Road 2591
- Geography of Texas
- Geology of Texas
- McAdoo, Texas
- Mount Blanco
- Mushaway Peak
- Salt Fork Brazos River
