= McDonald Creek (Salt Fork Brazos River tributary) =

Coordinates: 33°19′14″N 101°11′47″W

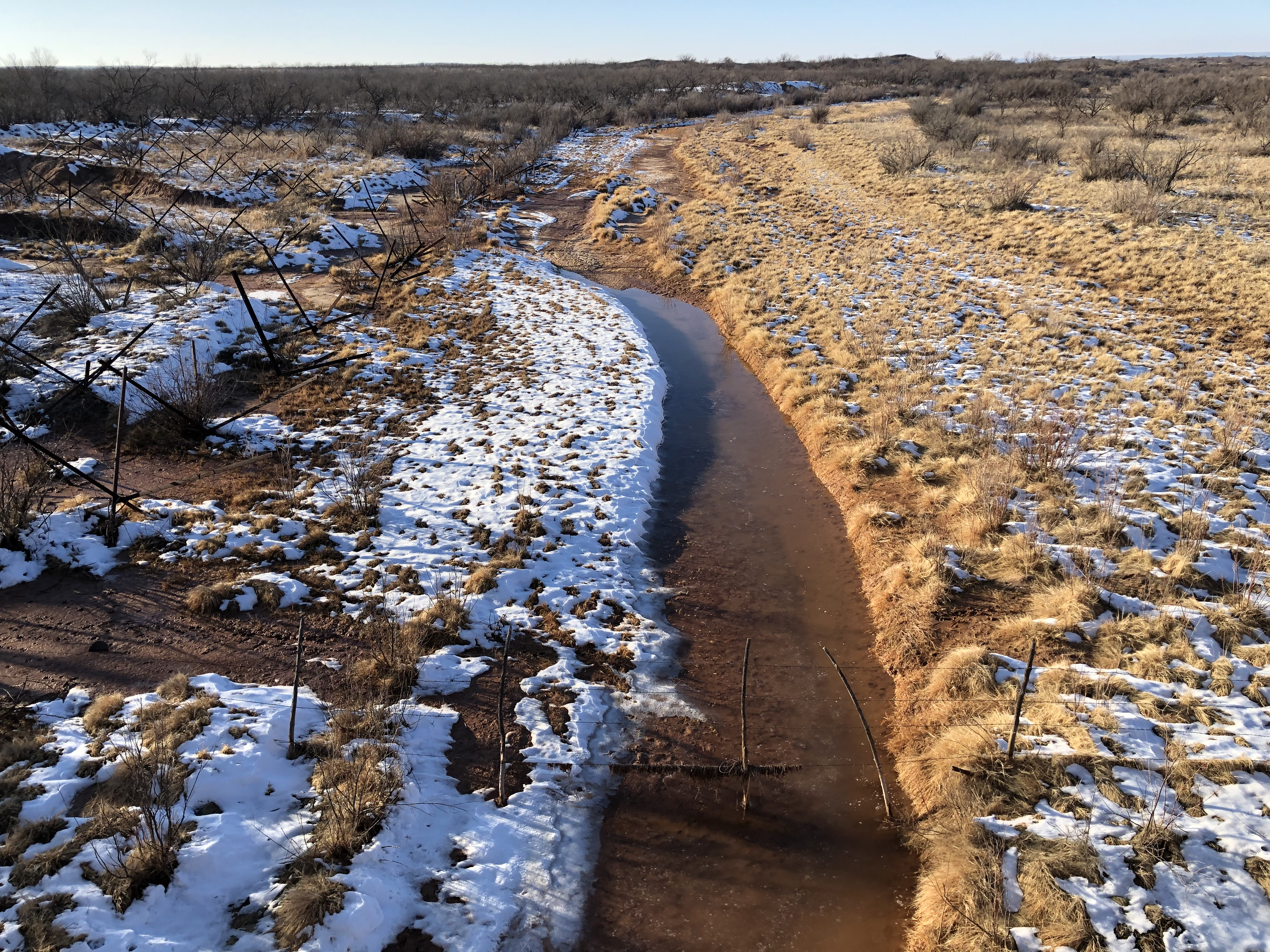
- Melting snow at McDonald Creek

Location
- Country: United States

Physical characteristics
- Source
  - location: Crosby County, Texas
  - elevation: 2,969 ft (905 m)
- Mouth
  - location: Garza County, Texas
  - elevation: 2,270 ft (690 m)
- Length: 25 mi (40 km)

McDonald Creek is an intermittent stream, about 25 mi (40 km) long, heading about 10 mi (16 km) south-southwest of Crosbyton, Texas, and trending generally southeast to join the Salt Fork Brazos River near the community of Verbena, Texas.

== Geography ==
McDonald Creek rises along the eastern edge of the Caprock Escarpment of the Llano Estacado. The stream channel initially runs southeast then curves to the southwest where it merges with Turkey Creek about 5 mi (8.0 km) west-northwest of Kalgary, Texas. It then runs south to join Lake Creek about 1 mi (1.6 km) upstream of Farm to Market Road 651. The stream then runs southeast where it merges with the Salt Fork Brazos River at a low-water crossing on Farm to Market Road 2008, near the sparsely populated community of Verbena.

Overall, McDonald Creek descends about 700 ft (210 m) from its source to its mouth, passing through highly eroded and moderately steep terrain along its course.

== See also ==
- List of rivers of Texas
- Caprock Escarpment
- Canyon Valley, Texas
- Double Mountains (Texas)
- Duffy's Peak
