= Duck Creek (Brazos River tributary) =

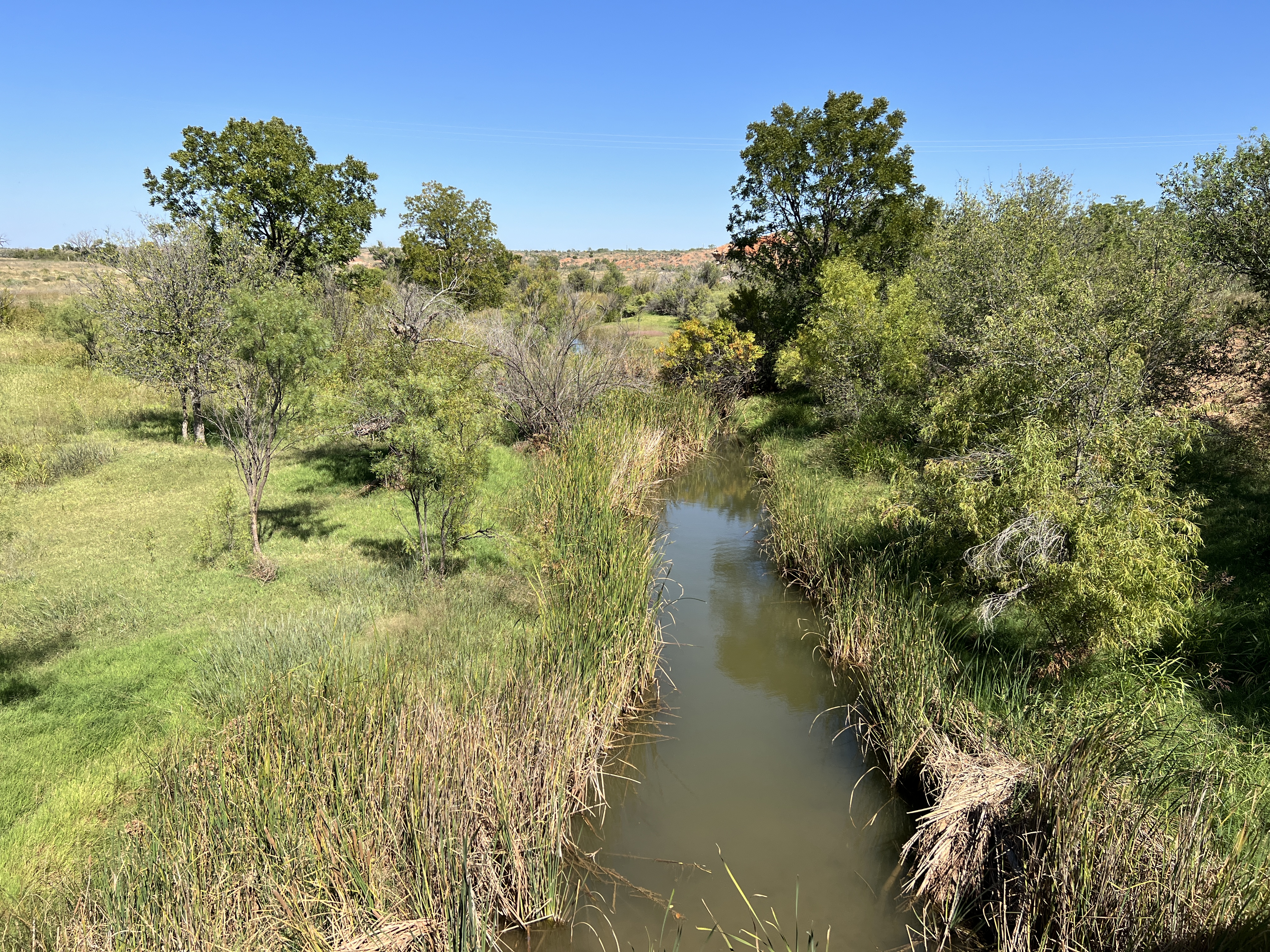

Location
- Country: United States
- State: Texas

Physical characteristics
- Source
  - location: Dickens County
  - elevation: 2,959 feet (902 m)
- Mouth: Salt Fork Brazos River
  - location: Kent County
  - coordinates: 33°14′28″N 100°41′34″W
  - elevation: 1,886 feet (575 m)

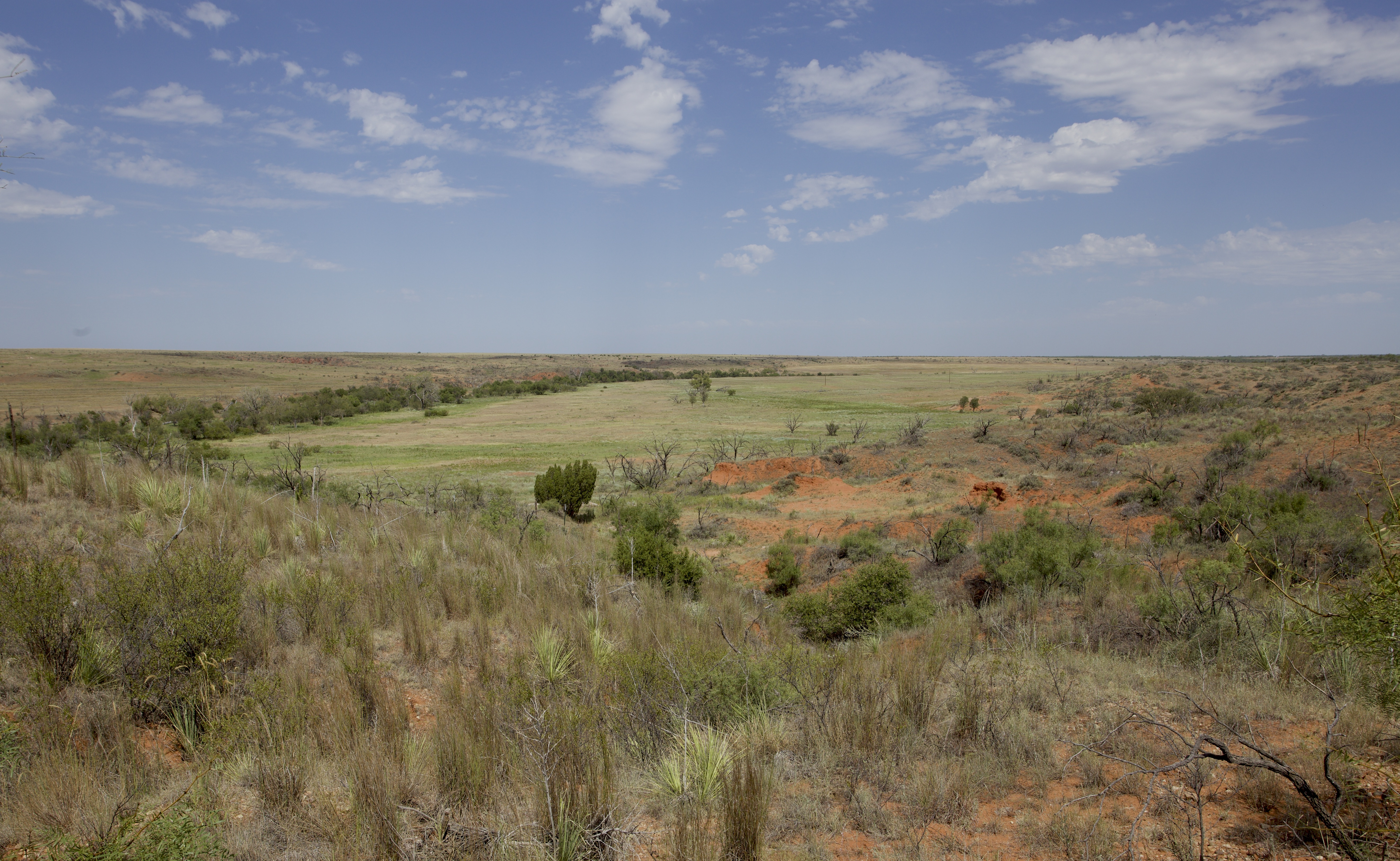
Valley of Duck Creek in Kent County, Texas.

Duck Creek is a spring-fed stream that flows through Dickens and Kent counties in the U.S. state of Texas. It is a tributary of the Salt Fork Brazos River, which eventually merges with the Double Mountain Fork to form the Brazos River.

== Geography ==
Duck Creek rises 7 miles (11 km) northwest of the small town of Dickens on the eastern edge of the Caprock Escarpment in northwest Dickens County and generally flows southeasterly where it merges with Cottonwood Creek at a downstream distance of around 11 miles (18 km). Continuing in a southeasterly direction for another 7 miles (11 km) the stream passes to the east of Spur, Texas, where it merges with Dockum Creek. At a point between Spur and Girard, Duck Creek merges with Camp Creek, then begins flowing west before curving to the south, passing just to the west of Girard. At a point about 8.5 miles (13.7 km) south-southwest of Girard, the stream terminates at its confluence with the Salt Fork Brazos River in Kent County.

== See also ==
- List of rivers of Texas
- Croton Creek
