= Jud, Texas =

Ghost town in Haskell County, Texas, United States

Coordinates: 33°17′44″N 99°57′27″W

Jud is a ghost town in extreme western Haskell County, Texas, United States. It lies on FM 617, 7 miles (11 km) west of Rochester. The Double Mountain Fork and Salt Fork Brazos River merge approximately 3 miles (4.8 km) west of present-day Jud to form the Brazos River.

== History ==
Jud is a farming community with ruins of an old Baptist church being the only building left standing. Each summer, a music festival named JUD FEST takes place with performances by local and regional Texas country artists and a meat cookoff.

== See also ==
- Kiowa Peak (Texas)
- Rath City, Texas, another ghost town on the Double Mountain Fork of the Brazos
- Double Mountains (Texas)
