= Mount Blanco =

Fossil bearing locality in Texas

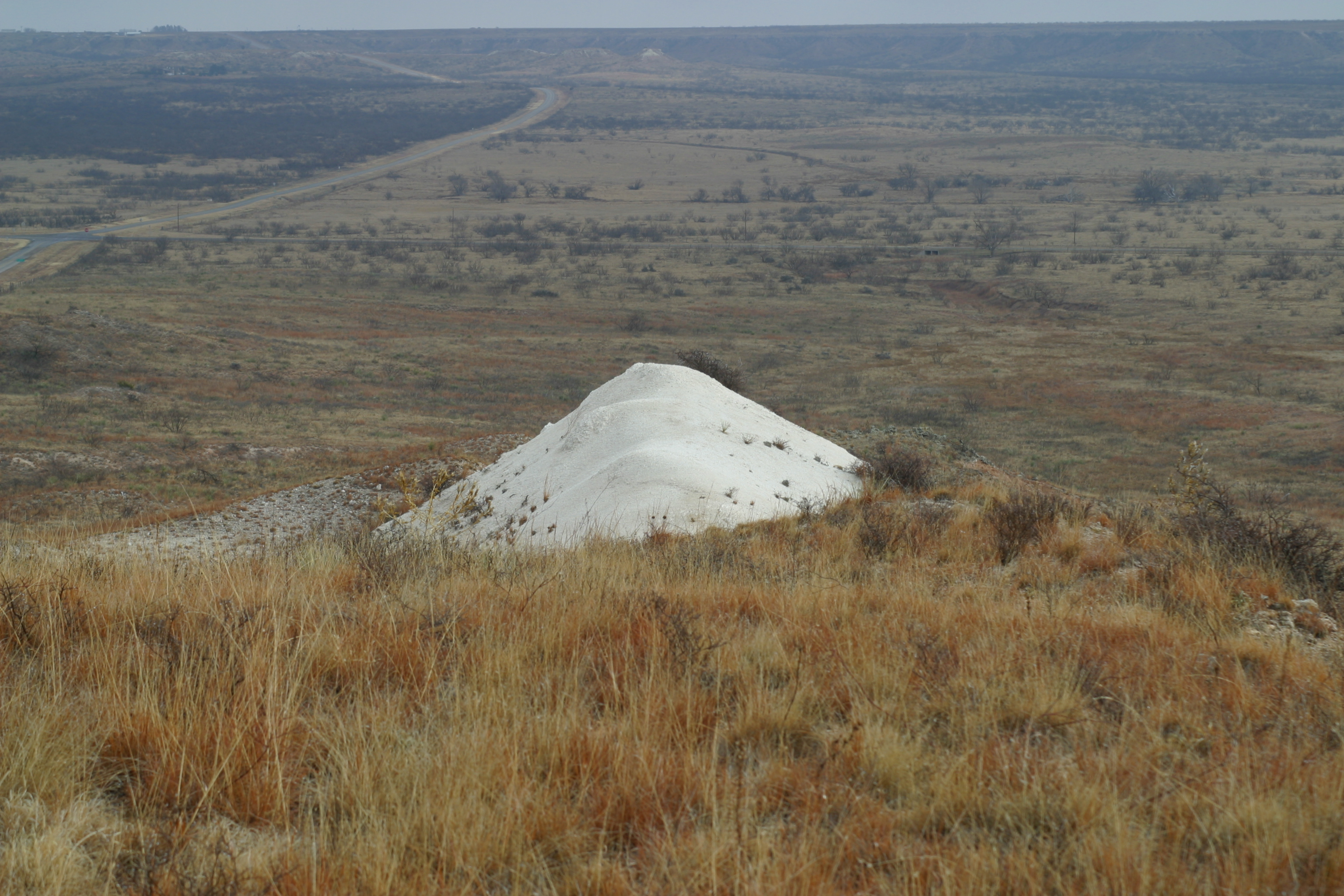
- Mount Blanco viewed from above

Highest point
- Elevation: 3,074 ft (937 m)
- Coordinates: 33°47′29″N 101°15′11″W

Geography
- Location within Texas

Geology
- Rock age(s): Late Blancan ?2.5-1.8mya?, Early Pleistocene
- Mountain type: Butte

Mount Blanco is a small white hill — an erosional remnant — located on the eastern border of the Llano Estacado within Blanco Canyon in Crosby County, Texas. With Blanco Canyon, it is the type locality of the early Pleistocene Blanco Formation of Texas and Kansas, as well as the Blancan fauna, which occurs throughout North America. Mount Blanco is a Late Blancan age site, and is associated with other Late Blancan sites from Texas such as Red Light and Hudspeth local faunas from Hudspeth County, and the Cita Canyon fauna from Randall County.

== Geology ==
The term "Blanco Canyon beds", later shortened to "Blanco beds", was first applied to this formation in 1890 by William F. Cummins of the Geological Survey of Texas. The Blanco beds were considered to be of lacustrine origin – deposited in a Pleistocene lake basin set upon the Ogallala Formation of middle Pliocene age, which underlies the upper surface sediments of the Llano Estacado.

The local absence of any aquatic/semi-aquatic vertebrates (such as fish, amphibians, microtine rodents, beavers or otters) suggests that the pond was a seasonally drained & shallow basin, like many of the lakes on the High Plains today. The lake was of restricted area as shown by the extent of the lacustrine deposits, and at most probably covered about 10 acres.

The thickness of the Blanco beds varies from around 22 to 26 m (72 to 85 ft) thick. The formation mainly consists of light-gray, fine-grained clay deposits and greenish sand, but indurated sandstone, caliche gravel, freshwater limestone and some conglomerate also are present. Volcanic ash is apparently mixed through the sediments; most clays are bentonitic. The few diatomite beds are restricted in area. These light-colored sediments contrast sharply with the locally rust-colored sediments of the Ogallala Formation.

The Blanco beds are to some extent sandwiched by volcanic ash layers, which assist in dating the site. The lower Blanco ash was dated to 2.8 ± 0.3 million years ago. The much more shallow volcanic ash which overlies the Blanco beds matches petrographically to the rhyolite air-fall tephra (Guaje Pumice bed) that underlies ash flows of the Bandelier Tuff in the Jemez Mountains of northern New Mexico, dated to between 1.77 ± 0.44 million and 1.4 ± 0.2 million years.

== Paleoecology ==
The Blanco Beds were once semi-arid grassy plains, with narrow belts of trees fringing watercourses and in the shaded parts of valleys. Conditions were almost identical to those of the High Plains and Texas Panhandle today. The most common fossils are of grassland species. Some woodland dwellers are represented, such as ground sloths, deer and peccaries. Abundant fossils of reeds and aquatic plants occur in the diatomite beds, representing seasonal ponds.

The abundant hackberry seeds at the Red Quarry prove the abundance of this tree near water, and if the hackberry was present, cottonwood was almost certainly present too.

=== Fossil fauna ===
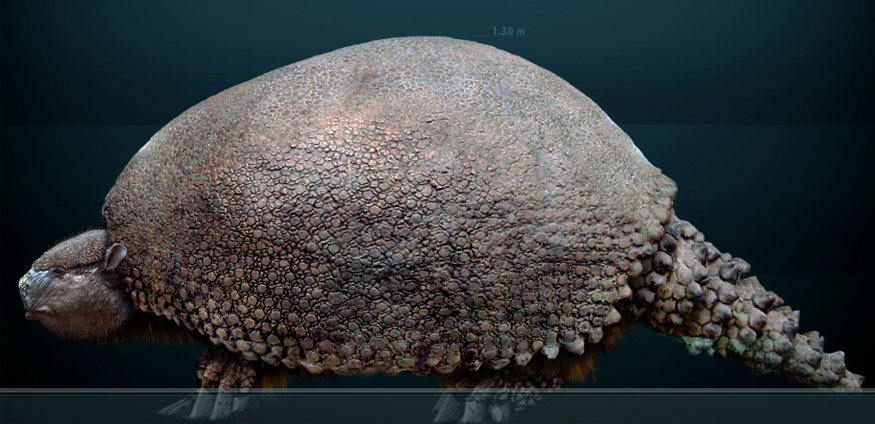
Glyptotherium reconstruction.

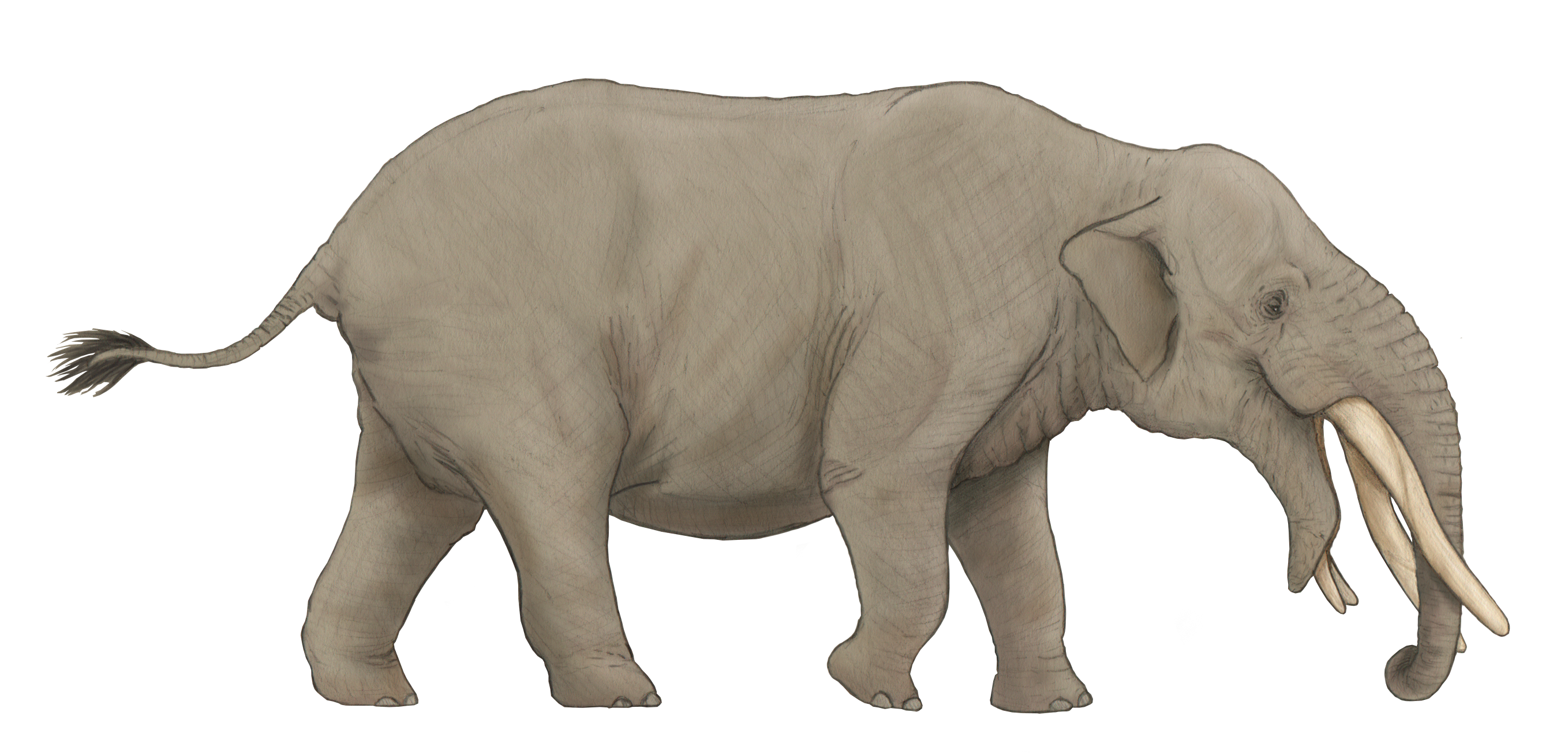
Restoration of Rhynchotherium. The Blanco fauna represents the youngest known locality for the genus.

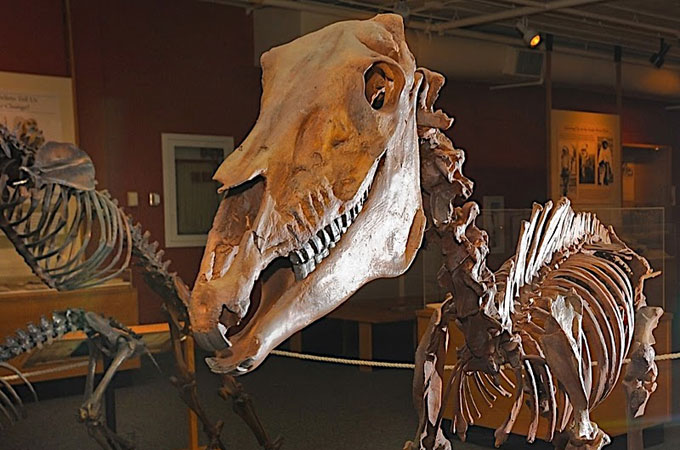
Equus simplicidens skeletal reconstruction.

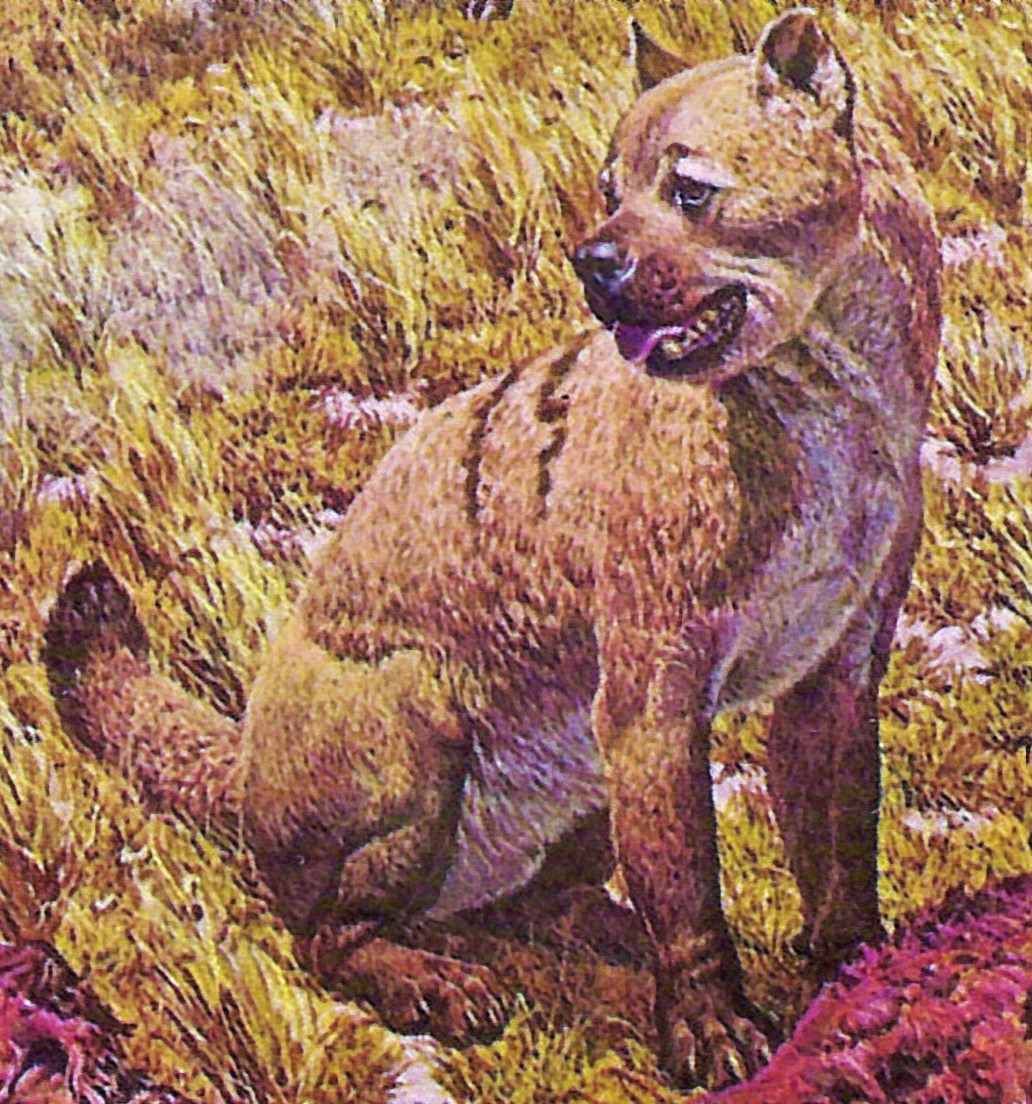
Illustration of Borophagus.

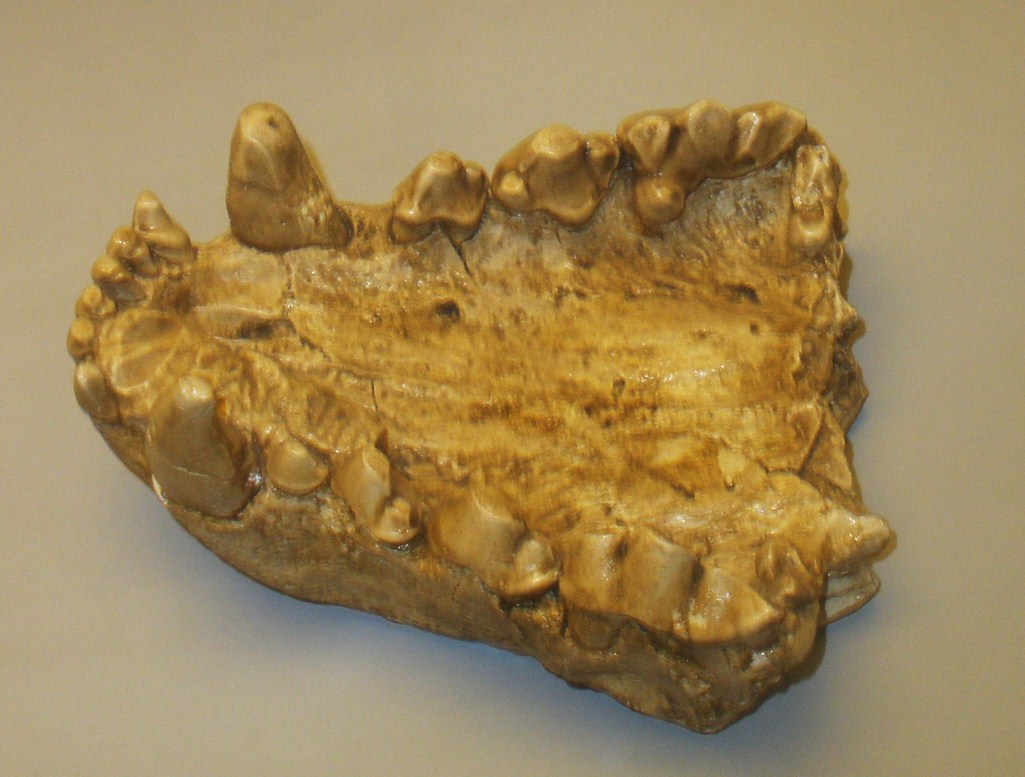
Chasmaporthetes jawbone.

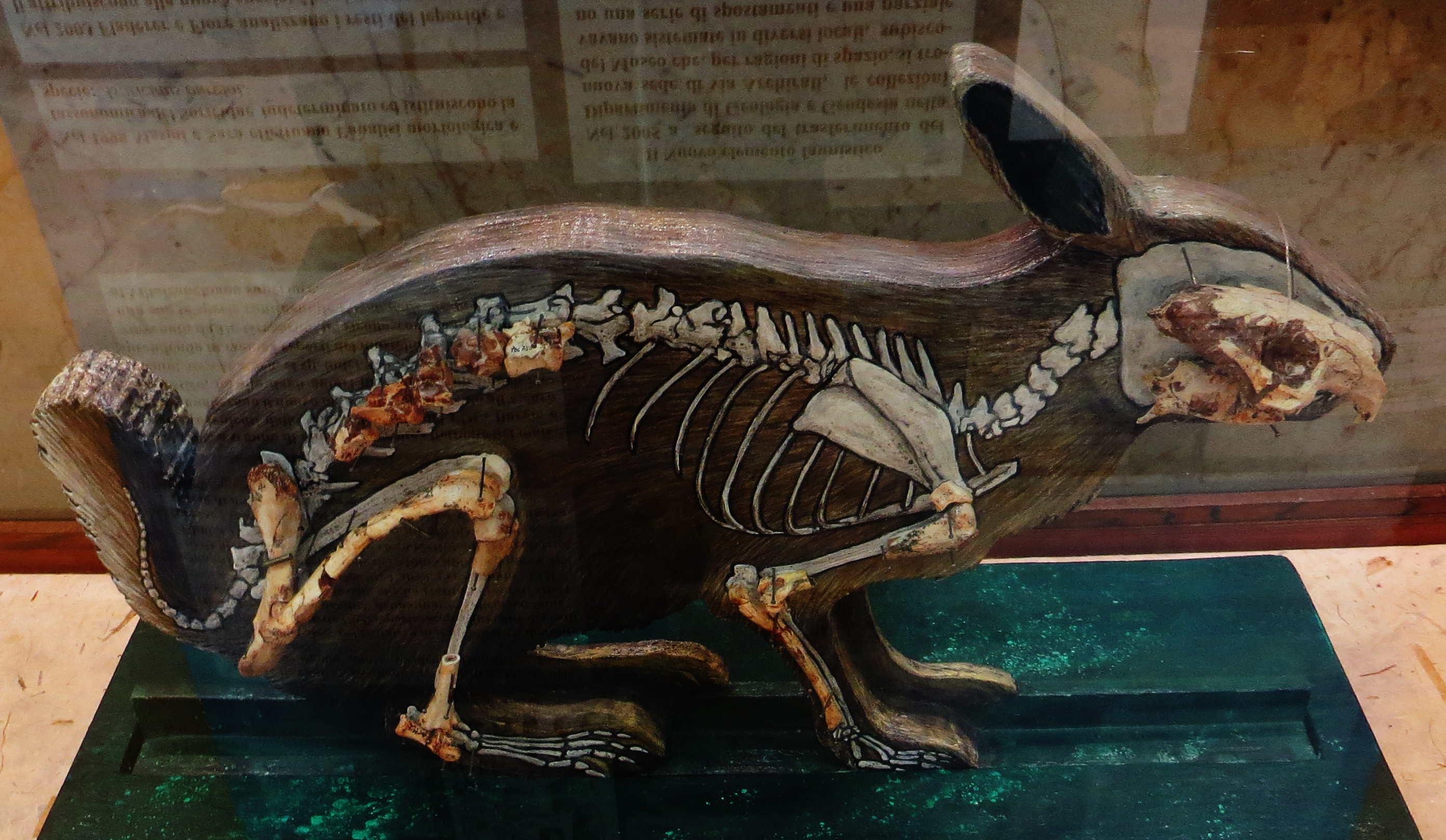
Reconstruction of Hypolagus.

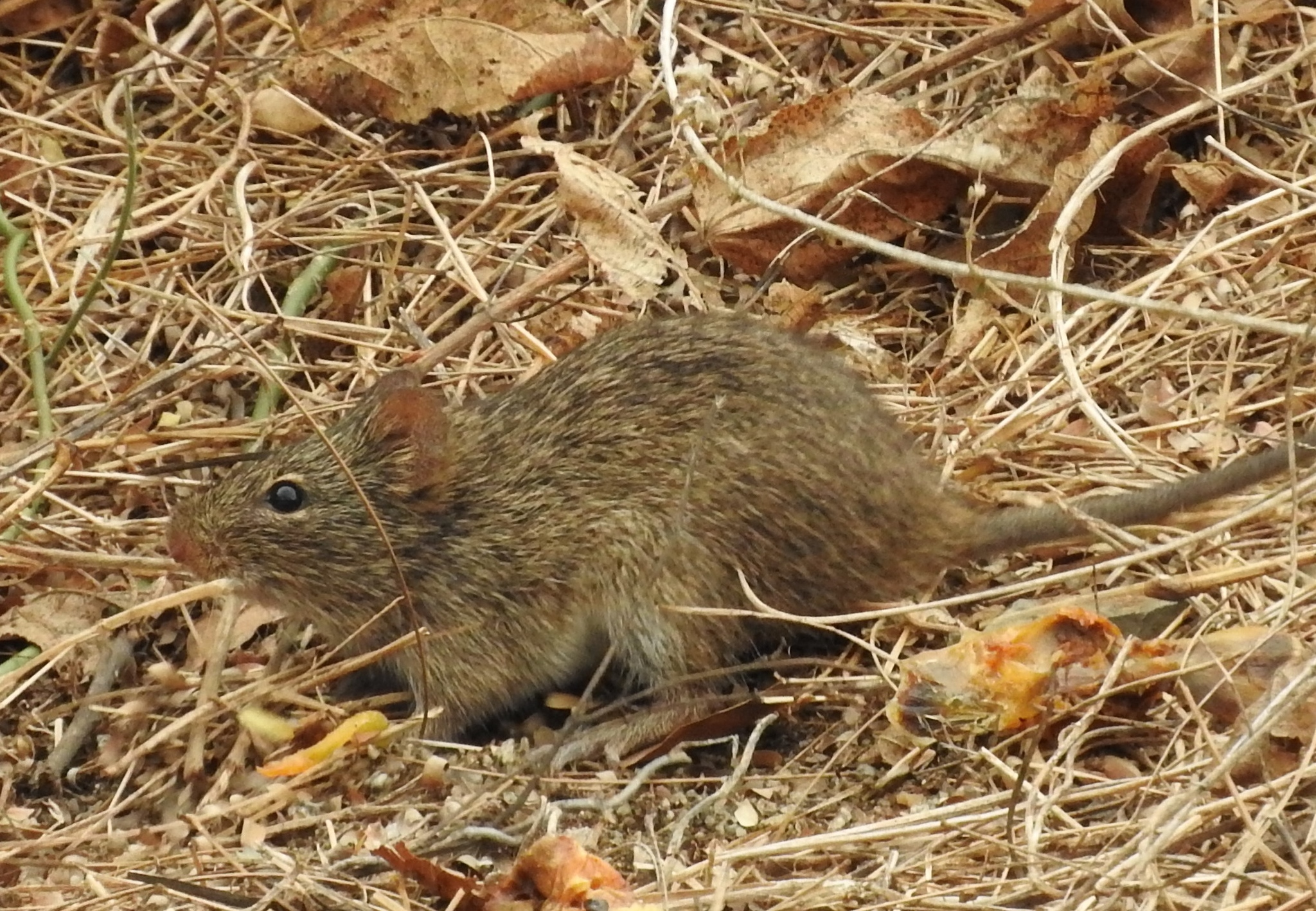
Cotton rats (Sigmodon) are the most common fossil of the Blanco fauna, and help indicate that the locality was largely grassland.

All fossil fauna are from Mount Blanco as described by Dalquest (1975) unless otherwise noted. A single alligator tooth, a few aquatic snail shells, and several land tortoises have also been recovered from the site. Dalquest describes the Rexroad fauna of Meade County, Kansas as the most similar assemblage to the Blanco fauna.

As the Blanco Formation disconformably overlies the middle Pliocene Ogalla Formation, and is again disconformably overlain by aeolian silts and sands, the age of the Blanco fauna is based mainly upon the evidence of fossil vertebrates. For example, some fauna that did not survive the Blancan, such as Borophagus, Equus simplicidens, Nannippus, Rhynchotherium, and Titanotyopus, are present. Additionally, other genera such as Camelops, Hemiauchenia, and Platygonus first appear in the Blancan age. Late Blancan faunas are defined primarily on the presence of mammals of the Great American Interchange, and on absolute dates when available.

Most of the fossils consist of disarticulated specimens, although in a few cases articulated skeletons have been found in the white clay. The most famous example is of Equus simplicidens, collected for the American Museum of Natural History. At one locality, Meade collected the remains of around 18 individuals of the giant camel Titanotylopus. Other significant discoveries include the skull and jaws of Dinofelis palaeoonca, and a carapace of Glyptotherium. The Blanco beds are the 'type locality' for Nannippus peninsulatus and Platygonus bicalcaratus.

- Class Mammalia
  - Superorder Xenarthra
    - Family †Glyptodontidae
      - †Glyptotherium texanum
    - Family Megalonychidae
      - †Megalonyx leptostomus
    - Family †Mylodontidae
      - †Paramylodon sp. (Note: Described by Dalquest as Glossotherium cf. chapadinalense.)
  - Superorder Afrotheria
    - Order Proboscidea
      - Family †Gomphotheriidae
        - †Rhynchotherium falconeri (Note: Described by Dalquest as Rhynchotherium praecursor.)
        - †Stegomastodon mirificus
      - Family †Mammutidae
        - Indeterminate †Mammut
  - Superorder Laurasiatheria
    - Order Artiodactyla
      - Family Antilocapridae
        - Indeterminate antilocaprid
      - Family Camelidae
        - †Blancocamelus meadei
        - †Camelops cf. traviswhitei
        - †Hemiauchenia blancoensis (Note: Described by Dalquest as Tanupolama blancoensis.)
        - †Titanotylopus spatulus
        - Indeterminate camelid
      - Family Cervidae
        - †Odocoileus cf. brachyodontus
      - Family Tayassuidae
        - †Platygonus bicalcaratus
    - Order Perissodactyla
      - Family Equidae
        - †Equus cumminsi
        - †Equus simplicidens
        - †Nannippus peninsulatus (Note: Described by Dalquest as Nannipus phlegon.)
    - Order Carnivora
      - Family Canidae
        - †Borophagus diversidens
        - †Canis lepophagus
      - Family Felidae
        - †Dinofelis palaeoonca
        - †?Homotherium
        - †?Puma lacustris (Note: Described by Dalquest as Felis cf. lacustris.)
      - Family Hyaenidae
        - †?Chasmaporthetes ossifragus (Note: Described by Dalquest as Chasmaporthetes johnstoni.)
      - Family Mustelidae
        - †Canimartes cumminsi
        - †Spilogale rexroadi
    - Order Chiroptera
      - ?Tadarida sp.
    - Order Eulipotyphla
      - Family Soricidae
        - †Sorex taylori
      - Family Talpidae
        - †Hesperoscalops blancoensis
  - Superorder Euarchontoglires
    - Order Lagomorpha
      - Family Leporidae
        - †Hypolagus sp.
        - †Nekrolagus cf. progressus
    - Order Rodentia
      - Family Cricetidae
        - Baiomys sp.
        - †Bensonomys sp.
        - †Neotoma cf. quadriplicatus
        - Onychomys sp.
        - † Peromyscus cf. kansasensis
        - Reithrodontomys sp.
        - †Sigmodon medius
      - Family Geomyidae
        - Geomys sp.
      - Family Heteromyidae
        - †Perognathus cf. pearlettensis
        - †Perognathus cf. rexroadensis
        - †Prodipomys centralis
      - Family Sciuridae
        - †Paenemarmota barbouri
        - †?Otospermophilus sp. (Note: Described in the paper as Spermophilus large, possibly O. rexroadensis. May also refer to Spermophilus medium.)
        - †Ictidomys howelli (Note: Described by Dalquest as Spermophilus cf. howelli.)

== Images ==
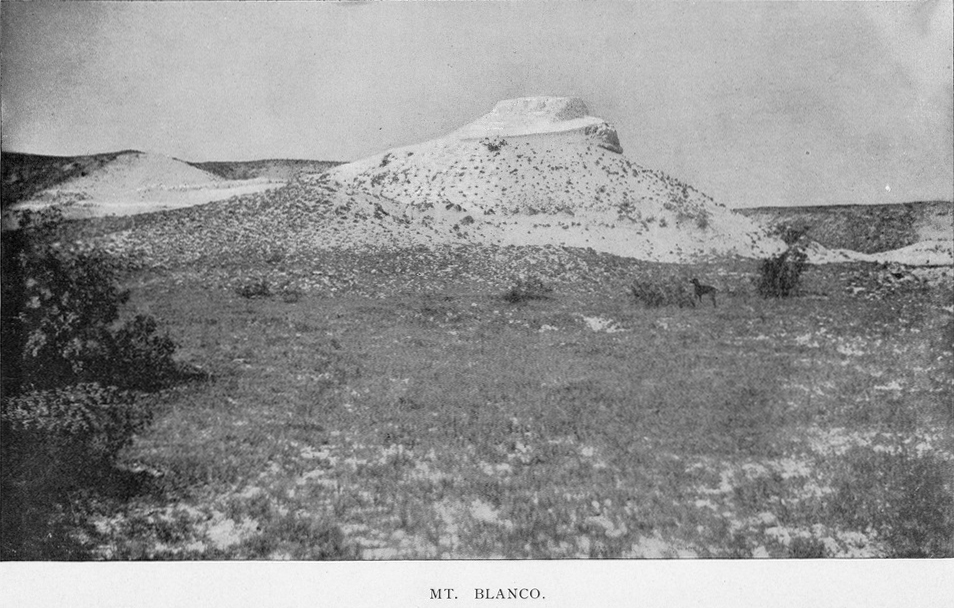
Early photo of Mount Blanco (1891)

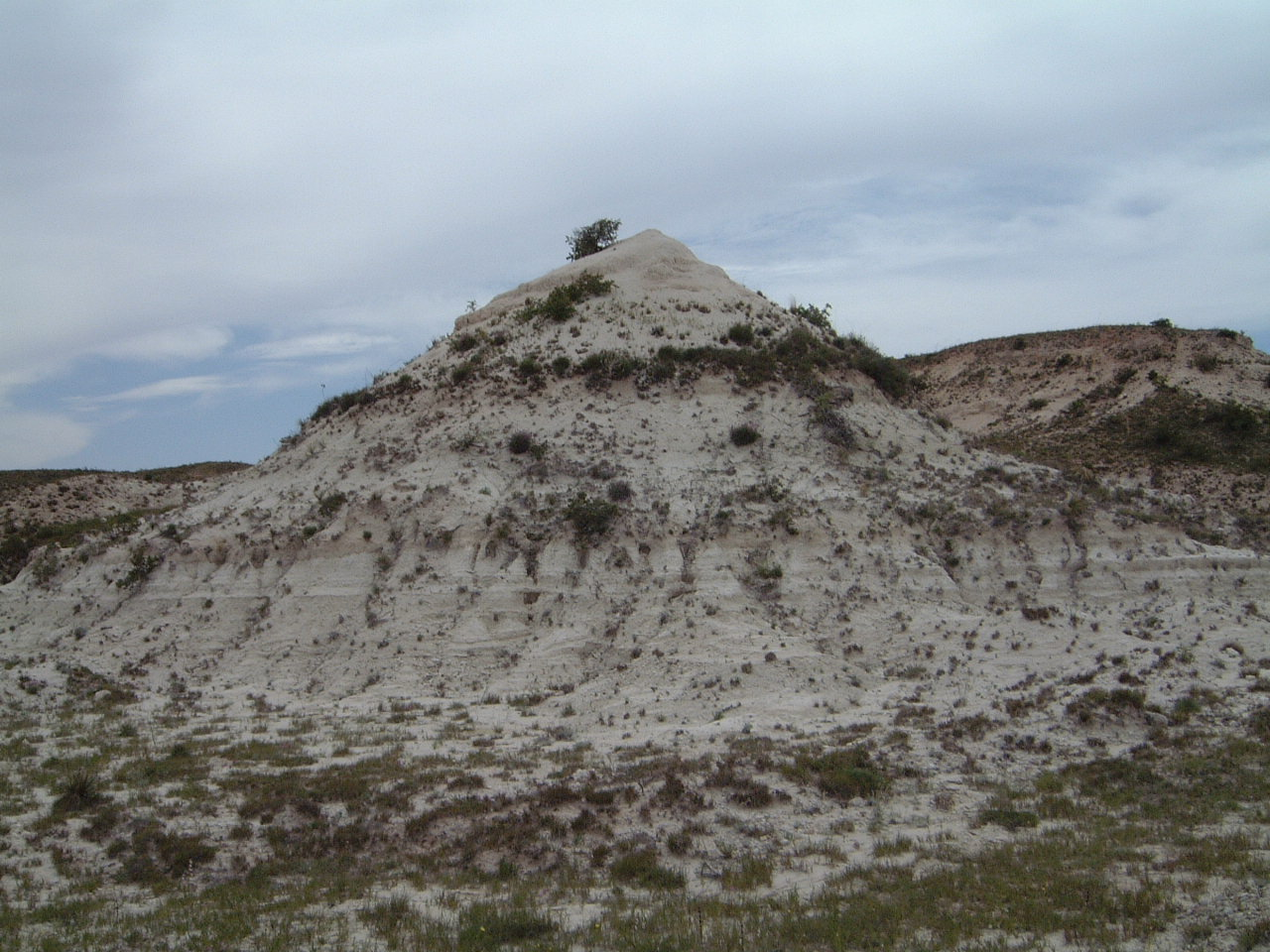
Mount Blanco viewed from east (2002)

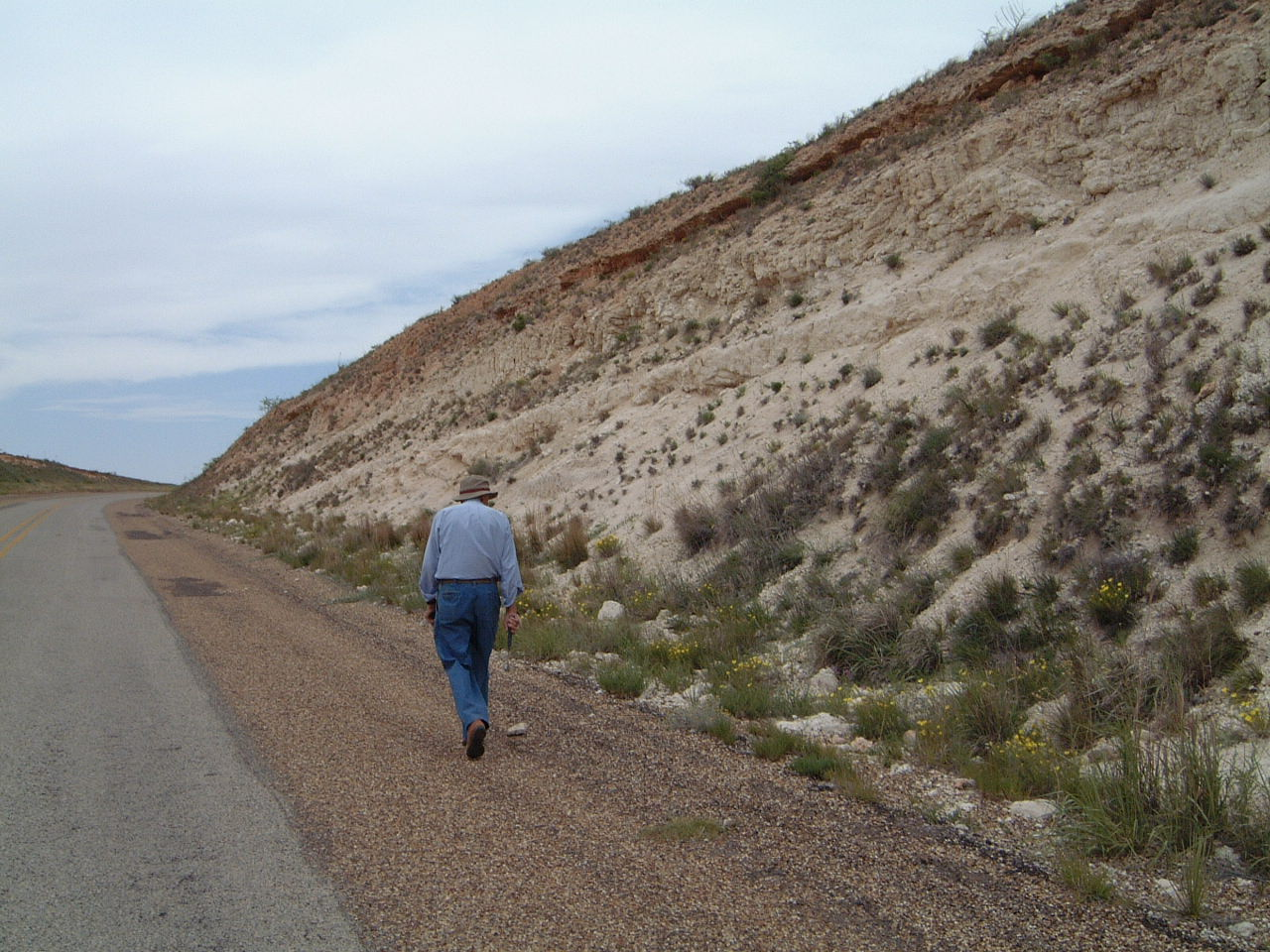
Blanco and Blackwater Draw formations are exposed at this road cut along Texas Ranch Road 193. (2002)

== See also ==
- Blancan
- Blanco Canyon
- Caprock Escarpment
- Double Mountains
- Duffy's Peak
- Kiowa Peak
- Mushaway Peak
- White River (Texas)
