= Croton Creek =

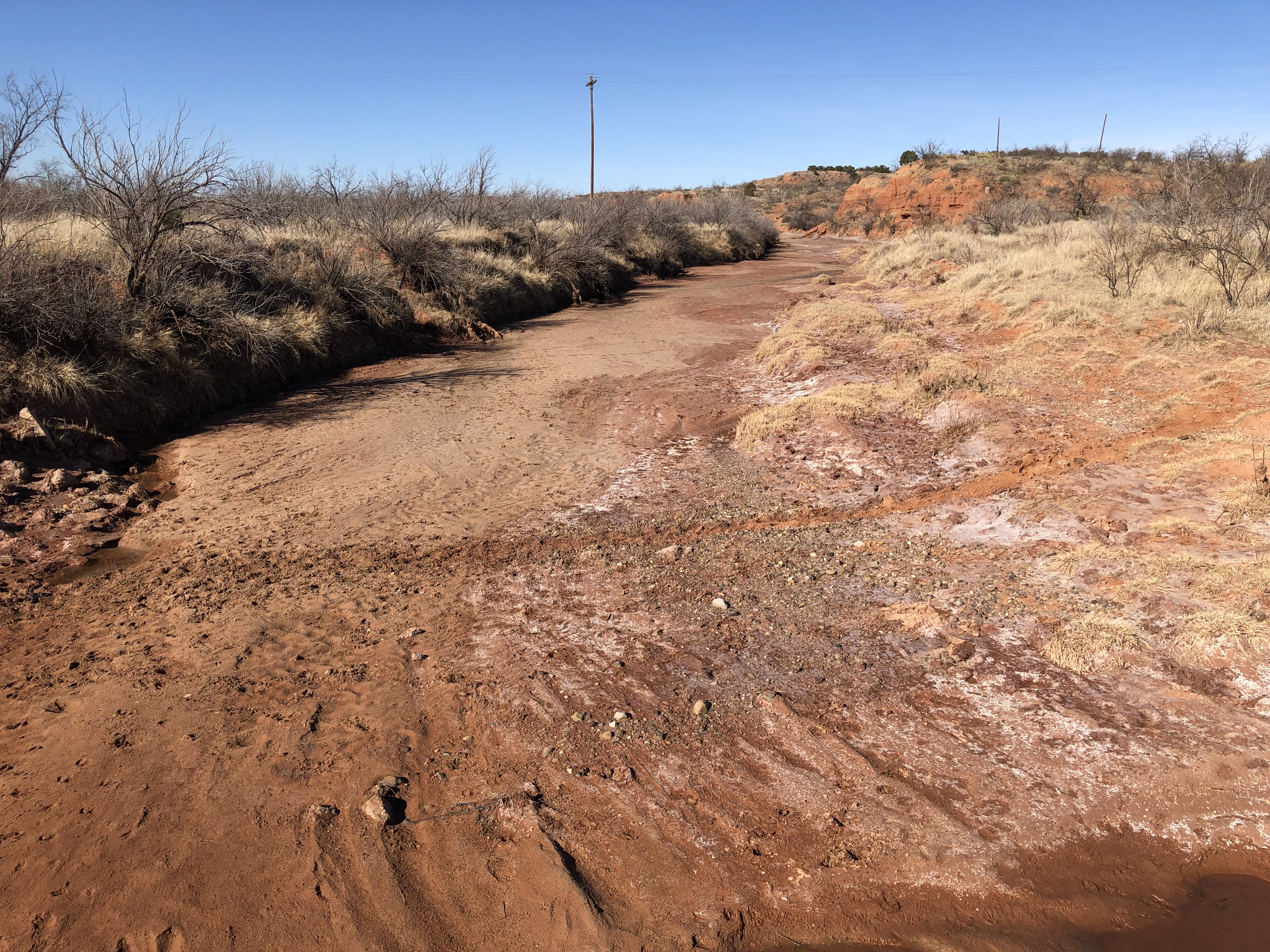
- Dry streambed of Croton Creek

Location
- Country: United States
- State: Texas

Physical characteristics
- Source
  - location: Dickens County
  - elevation: 2,696 ft (822 m)
- Mouth: Salt Fork Brazos River
  - location: Stonewall County
  - elevation: 1,705 ft (520 m)
- Length: 65 mi (105 km)

Croton Creek is an intermittent stream that flows through the Croton Breaks of Dickens, Kent and Stonewall counties in the U.S. state of Texas. It is a tributary of the Salt Fork Brazos River, which eventually merges with the Double Mountain Fork to form the Brazos River.

== See also ==
- List of rivers of Texas
- Duck Creek
- Kiowa Peak (Texas)
