= Llano Estacado =

Region in the southwestern United States in New Mexico and Texas

Llano Estacado "Staked Plains"
- Southwestern United States
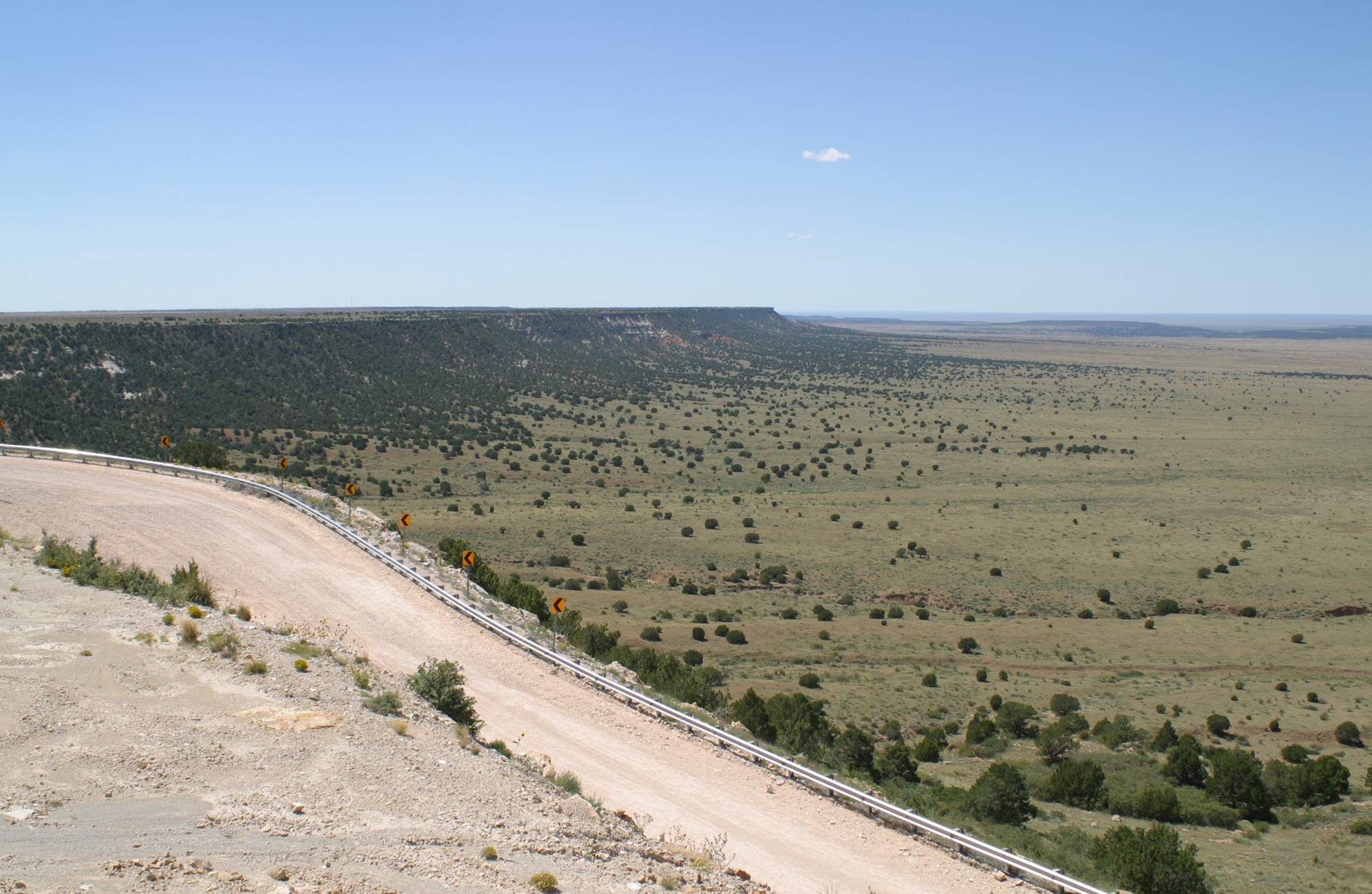
- Northwest escarpment of the Llano Estacado

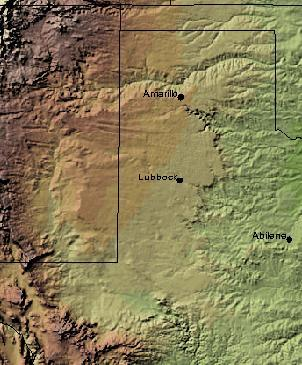
- Shaded relief image of the Llano Estacado. The escarpments marking the eastern edge of the Llano are visible, running roughly in a north–south line through the middle of the Panhandle. The western edge is on the New Mexico side of the border, with the Texas–New Mexico border running considerably closer to the western edge of the Llano than to the eastern.
- Coordinates: 33°N 102°W
- Country: United States
- State: New Mexico and Texas

Area
  - Total: 32,000 sq mi (83,000 km^{2})

Population (2013)
  - Total: 1,230,000
  - Density: 38/sq mi (15/km^{2})

The Llano Estacado (Spanish: [ˈʝano estaˈkaðo]), translated into English as the Staked Plains, is a region in the Southwestern United States encompassing parts of eastern New Mexico and northwestern Texas. One of the largest mesas or tablelands on the North American continent, the elevation rises from 3,000 feet (900 m) in the southeast to over 5,000 feet (1,500 m) in the northwest, sloping almost uniformly at about 10 feet per mile (2 m/km).

== Name ==
The Spanish name Llano Estacado is often interpreted as meaning "Staked Plains", although "stockaded" or "palisaded plains" have also been proposed, in which case the name would derive from the steep escarpments on the eastern, northern, and western periphery of the plains. Leatherwood writes that Francisco Coronado and other European explorers described the Mescalero Ridge on the western boundary as resembling "palisades, ramparts, or stockades" of a fort, but does not present the original Spanish. In Beyond the Mississippi (1867), Albert D. Richardson, who traversed the region from east to west in October 1859, wrote that "the ancient Mexicans marked a route with stakes over this vast desert, and hence its name." Other sources refer to "stakes" used to mark routes on the featureless plain, often meaning piles of stone, bone, and cow dung. According to Place Names of New Mexico, others have speculated that "stakes" refers to the yucca plants that dot the plains. Leatherwood opines in the Handbook of Texas that such way markers could plausibly explain the origin of the name, but that the "comparison of cliff formations and palisades made by explorers argues more convincingly for the geological origin". In his Roadside Geology of Texas, Geologist Darwin Spearing also prefers the geological solution to the etymology:

The 'Staked Plains' tale is deeply entrenched in Texas mythology, but the real interpretation of Llano Estacado is sensible geologic: it means 'stockaded' or 'palisaded' plains - which is precisely how the edge of the plains appear when viewed from below the caprock.

Spanish conquistador Francisco Coronado, the first European to traverse this "sea of grass" in 1541, described it as follows:

I reached some plains so vast, that I did not find their limit anywhere I went, although I traveled over them for more than 300 leagues ... with no more land marks than if we had been swallowed up by the sea ... there was not a stone, nor bit of rising ground, nor a tree, nor a shrub, nor anything to go by.

== Geography and climate ==
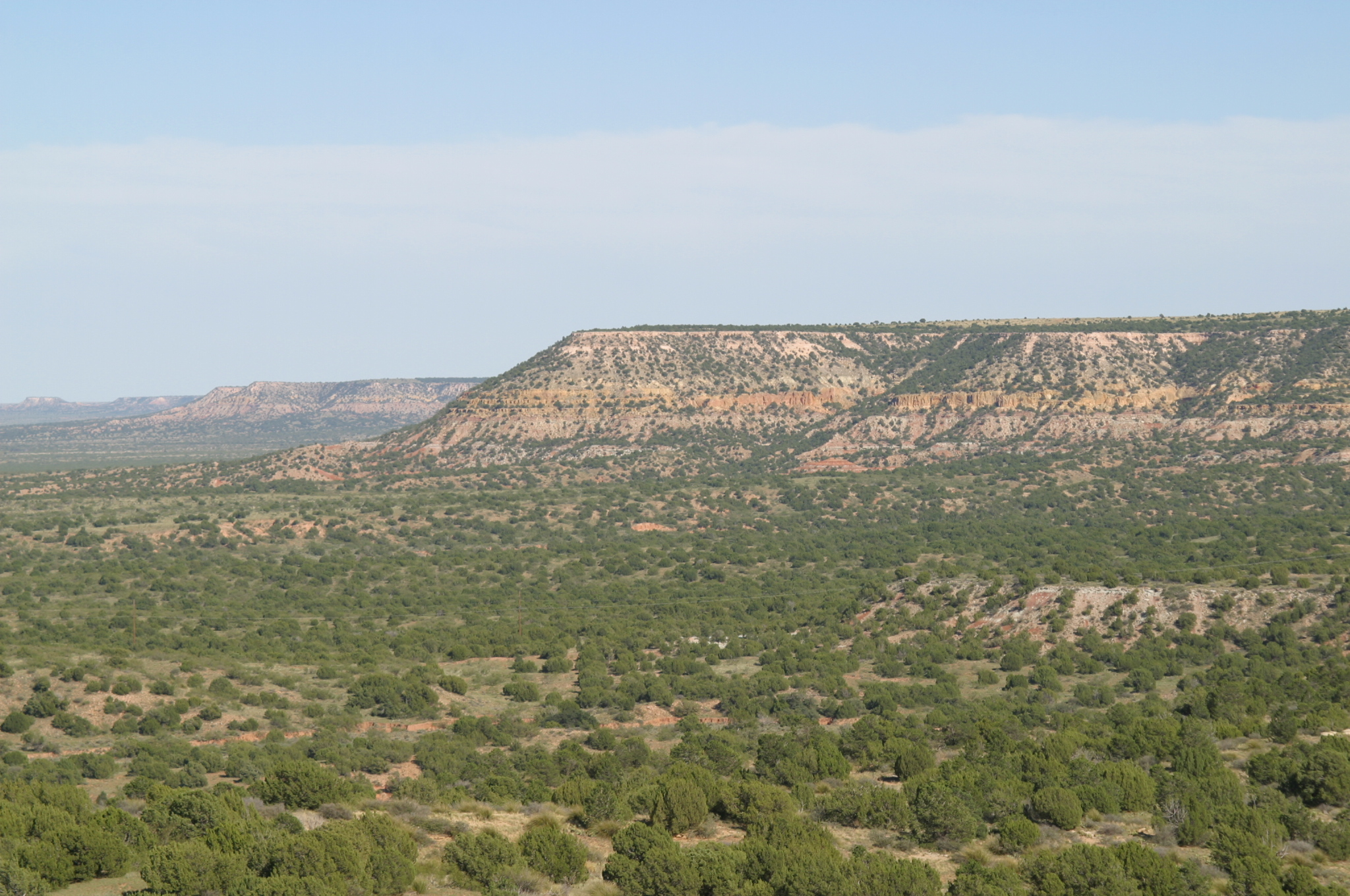
The northern edge of the Llano Estacado in New Mexico

Map of the Western short grasslands, which overlaps with the Llano Estacado.

The Llano Estacado lies at the southern end of the Western High Plains ecoregion of the Great Plains of North America; it is part of what was once called the Great American Desert. The Canadian River forms the Llano's northern boundary, separating it from the rest of the High Plains. To the east, the Caprock Escarpment, a precipitous cliff about 300 feet (100 m) high, lies between the Llano and the red Permian plains of Texas; while to the west, the Mescalero Ridge demarcates the eastern edge of the Pecos River valley. The Llano has no distinct southern boundary, instead blending into the Edwards Plateau near Big Spring, Texas. This geographic area stretches about 250 miles (400 km) north to south, and 150 miles (240 km) east to west, a total area of some 32,000 square miles (83,000 km^{2}), larger than Indiana and 12 other states. It covers all or part of 33 Texas counties and four New Mexico counties. The area is susceptible to frequent dust storms because of its low relief, frequent turbulent winds, lack of vegetation, and loose topsoil. The landscape is dotted by numerous small playa lakes, depressions that seasonally fill with water and provide habitat for waterfowl.

The Llano Estacado has a cold semiarid climate (Köppen BSk), characterized by long, hot summers and cold winters. Rainfall is relatively low; the entire region receives fewer than 23 in (580 mm) of rainfall annually, and the western part receives as little as 14 in (360 mm). High summer temperatures (average high July temperature above 90 °F or 32 °C) mean that most of the small amount of precipitation is lost to evaporation, making dryland farming difficult.

As the Llano Estacado lies on the western edge of Tornado Alley, supercell thunderstorms capable of producing large, violent tornadoes and destructive hailstorms are common in spring and autumn.

The Texas State Historical Society states it covers all or part of 33 Texas counties, six fewer than as depicted by a US Geological Survey map, and four New Mexico counties.

As depicted by a US Geological Survey map, the Llano Estacado includes all or part of these Texas counties:

- Andrews
- Armstrong (northwest, northcentral, and far southwest portions)
- Bailey
- Borden (far northwestern portion)
- Briscoe (western portion)
- Carson
- Castro
- Cochran
- Crane (northern half)
- Crosby (northwest through northeast portions)
- Dawson (southern and eastern portions)
- Deaf Smith (entire county except northwest portion)
- Dickens (northwest portion)
- Ector
- Floyd (all but the far northeast portion)
- Gaines
- Garza (western portion)
- Glasscock
- Gray (west and north portions)
- Hale
- Hockley
- Howard (western half)
- Lamb
- Lubbock
- Lynn
- Midland
- Martin
- Oldham (south-central to southeast portions)
- Parmer
- Potter (southern portion)
- Randall
- Reagan (northwestern to far northeastern corner)
- Roberts (south-central portion)
- Swisher
- Terry
- Upton (northern half)
- Ward (northeastern portion)
- Winkler (eastern half)
- Yoakum

It also includes all or part of the following New Mexico counties:

- Curry
- Lea
- Quay
- Roosevelt

Several interstate highways serve the Llano Estacado. Interstate 40 crosses the northern portion from east of Amarillo to Tucumcari, New Mexico. Interstate 27 runs north-south between Amarillo and Lubbock, while Interstate 20 passes through the southern portion of the Llano Estacado west of Midland and Odessa.

== History ==
In the early 18th century, the Comanches expanded their territory into the Llano Estacado, displacing the Apaches who had previously lived there. The region became part of the Comancheria, a Comanche stronghold until the final defeat of the tribe in the late 19th century. The Comanche war trail extended from Llano Estacado to the Rio Grande into Chihuahua, "the trail ran southwesterly through Big Spring to the Horsehead Crossing of the Pecos River, then forked southward to the Comanche Springs where it divided, one part of the trail crossing the great river near Boquillas and the other at Presidio."

Rachel Plummer, while a captive of the Comanche in 1836, mentioned the "table lands between Austin and Santa Fe".

Robert Neighbors and Rip Ford, guided by Buffalo Hump, blazed the "upper route" trail from San Antonio to El Paso in 1849 for emigrants during the California Gold Rush, "... travelling across an elevated plateau almost covered by rock ..."

After his 1852 expedition to explore the headwaters of the Red and Colorado Rivers, General Randolph Marcy wrote: "[not] a tree, shrub, or any other herbage to intercept the vision ... the almost total absence of water causes all animals to shun it: even the Indians do not venture to cross it except at two or three places." In his report for the United States Army:

When we were upon the high table-land, a view presented itself as boundless as the ocean. Not a tree, shrub, or any other object, either animate or inanimate, relieved the dreary monotony of the prospect; it was a vast-illimitable expanse of desert prairie . ... the great Sahara of North America. it is a region almost as vast and trackless as the ocean—a land where no man, either savage or civilized permanently abides ... a treeless, desolate waste of uninhabitable solitude, which always has been, and must continue uninhabited forever.

During the 1854 Marcy-Neighbors expedition, Dr. George Getz Shumard noted, "Beyond the mountain appeared a line of high bluffs (the Llano Estacado) which in the distance looked like clouds floating upon the horizon."

Herman Lehmann was captured by the Apache in 1870 and described the Llano Estacado as "open, but not exactly a desert".

Robert G. Carter described it in 1871 while pursuing Quanah Parker with Ranald S. Mackenzie, "... all were over and out of the canyon upon what appeared to be a vast, almost illimitable expanse of prairie. As far as the eye could reach, not a bush or tree, a twig or stone, not an object of any kind or a living thing, was in sight. It stretched out before us-one uninterrupted plain, only to be compared to the ocean in its vastness."

In August 1872, Mackenzie was the first to successfully lead troops across the Staked Plains preparatory to the Battle of the North Fork of the Red River.

Billy Dixon described the area while hunting buffalo in June 1874: "All of us hunters acquainted with the habits of the buffalo knew that the herds would soon be coming north from the Staked Plains region where they had spent the winter ... moved by that strange impulse that ... caused them to change their home and blacken the Plains with their countless, moving forms."

Zane Grey, in his novel The Thundering Herd (1925), offered the following explanation for the name Llano Estacado: "Thet name Llano Estacado means Staked Plain," said the Texan. "It comes from the early days when the Spanish Trail from Santa Fe to San Antone was marked by 'palos,' or stakes. There was only two trails across in them days an' I reckon no more now. Only the Indians know this plain well an' they only run in heah to hide awhile. Water an' grass are plentiful in some parts, an' then there's stretches of seventy miles dry an' bare as a bone."

In the latter part of the 19th century, the Llano was a refuge for the bands of Kiowas and Comanches who did not wish to be confined to reservations in Indian Territory, in present-day Oklahoma. One of their last battles against the US Army was fought on 28 September 1874 in the Battle of Palo Duro Canyon.

Charles Goodnight described what it takes to be a scout: "... the trained ear should be able to tell the sound, whether it was made by man or beast or bird ... as a human voice echoes more than all others ... of course, on the Staked Plains we have not this advantage as there is nothing to create an echo."

Today, most of the area's population is localized in the principal cities of Amarillo, Lubbock, Midland and Odessa, Texas. The vast majority of the area is rural, covered by large ranches and irrigated farms. Several small- to medium-sized towns do exist, however, including Andrews, Hereford, Plainview, Levelland, Big Spring, and Lamesa, Texas, and Hobbs, Clovis, and Portales, New Mexico.

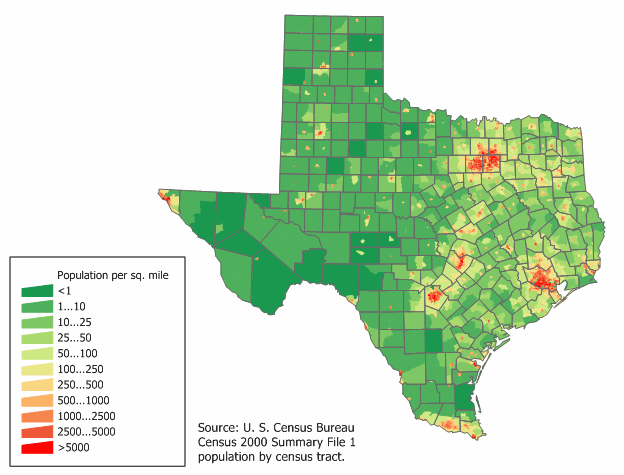
Map of Texas counties with population density

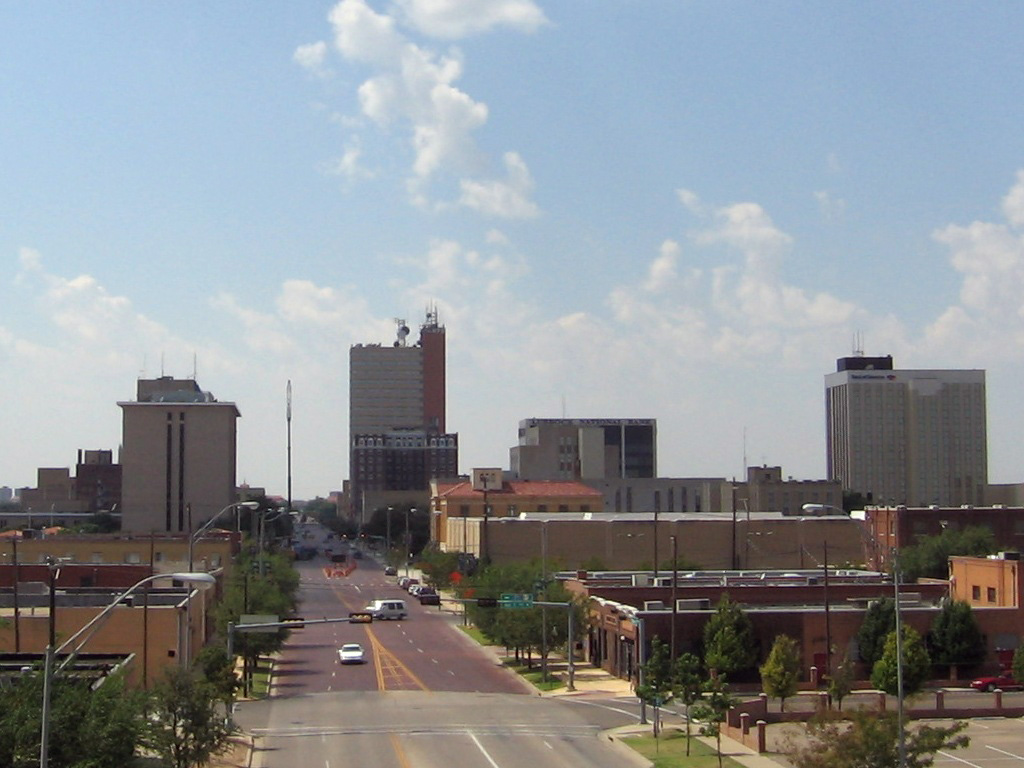
Lubbock, Texas, the largest city on the Llano

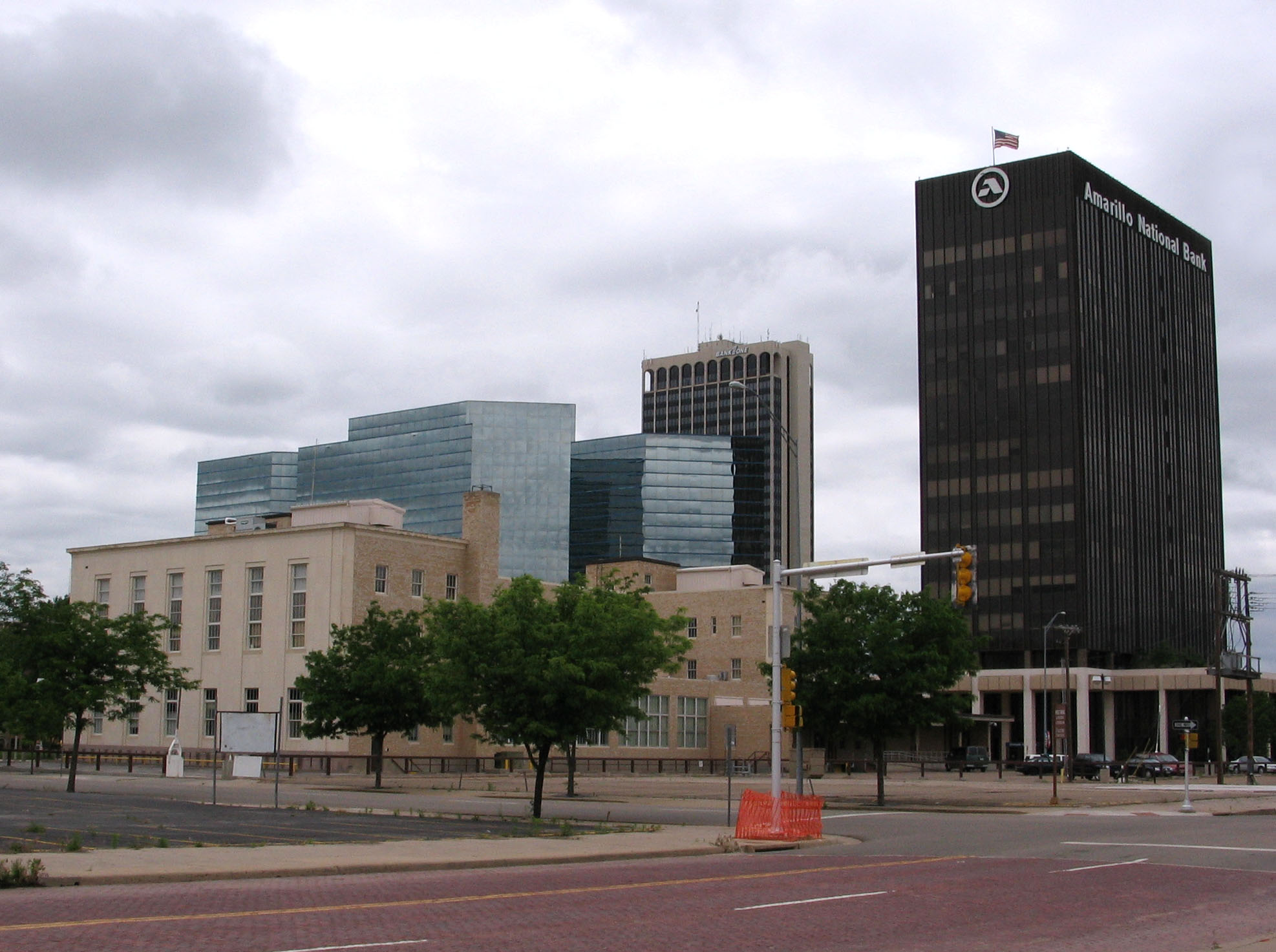
A shot of downtown Amarillo, Texas

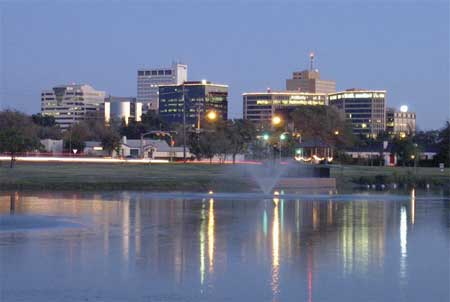
Midland, "The Tall City" of West Texas

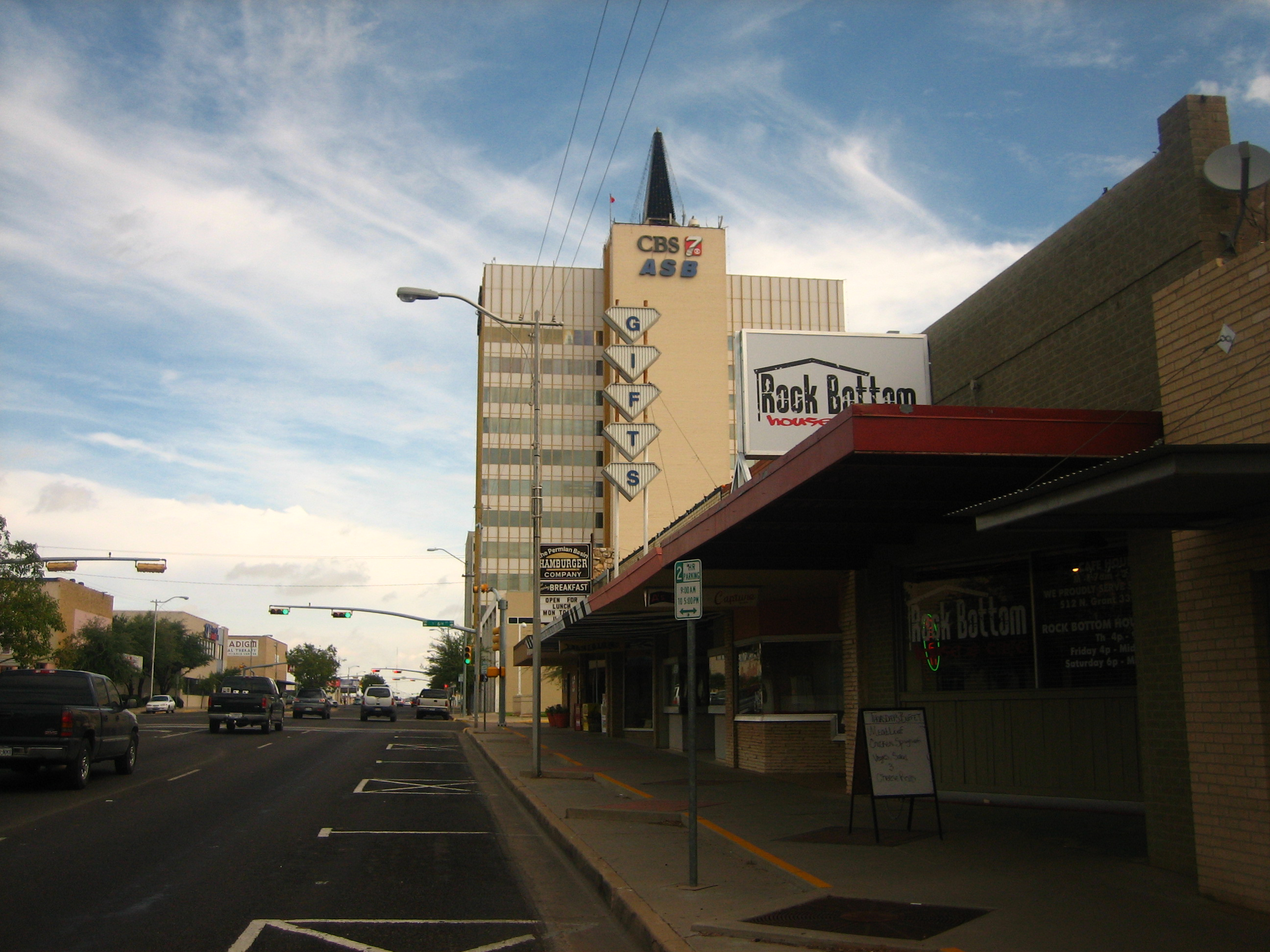
Downtown Odessa

== Geology ==
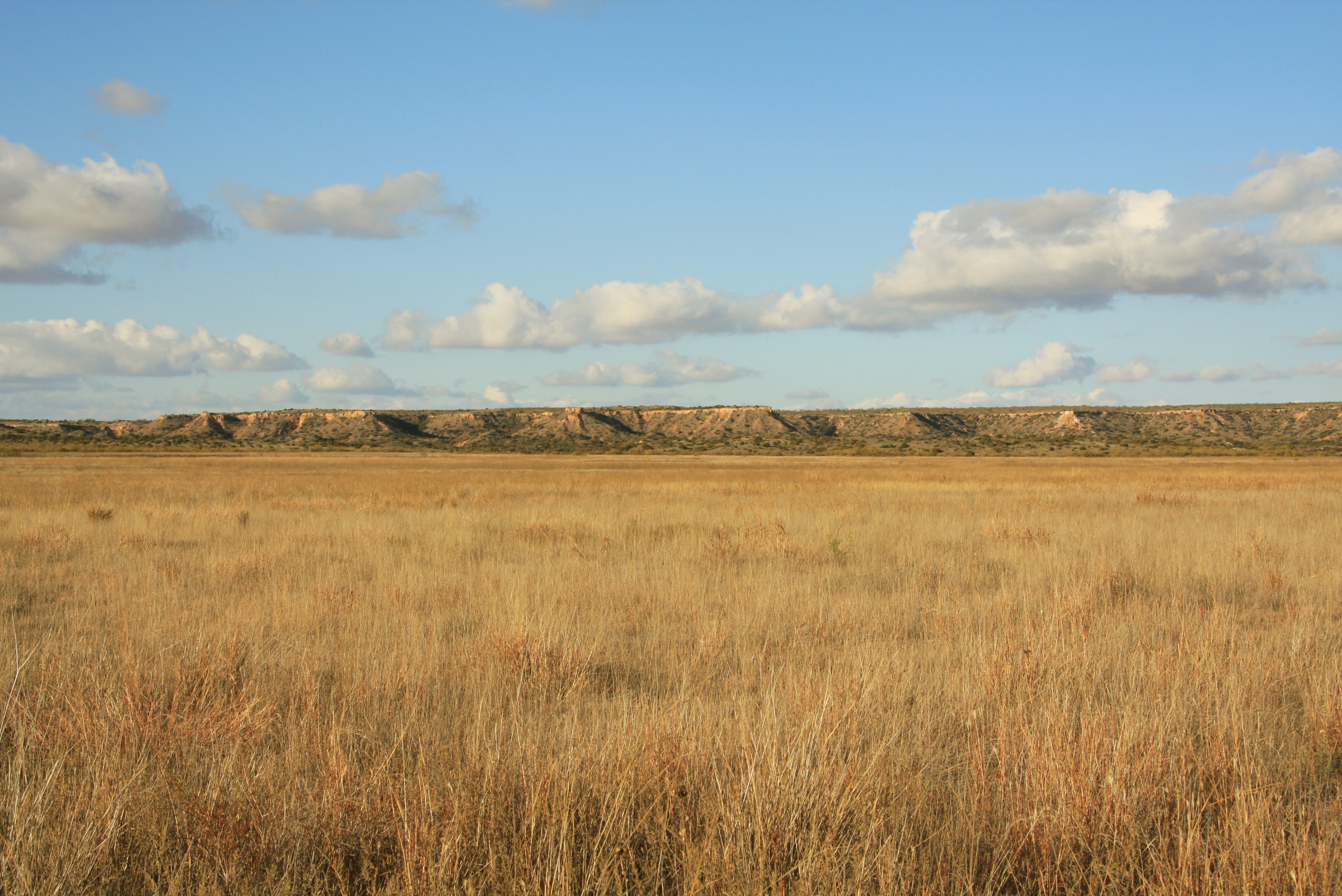
Caprock Escarpment south of Ralls, Texas

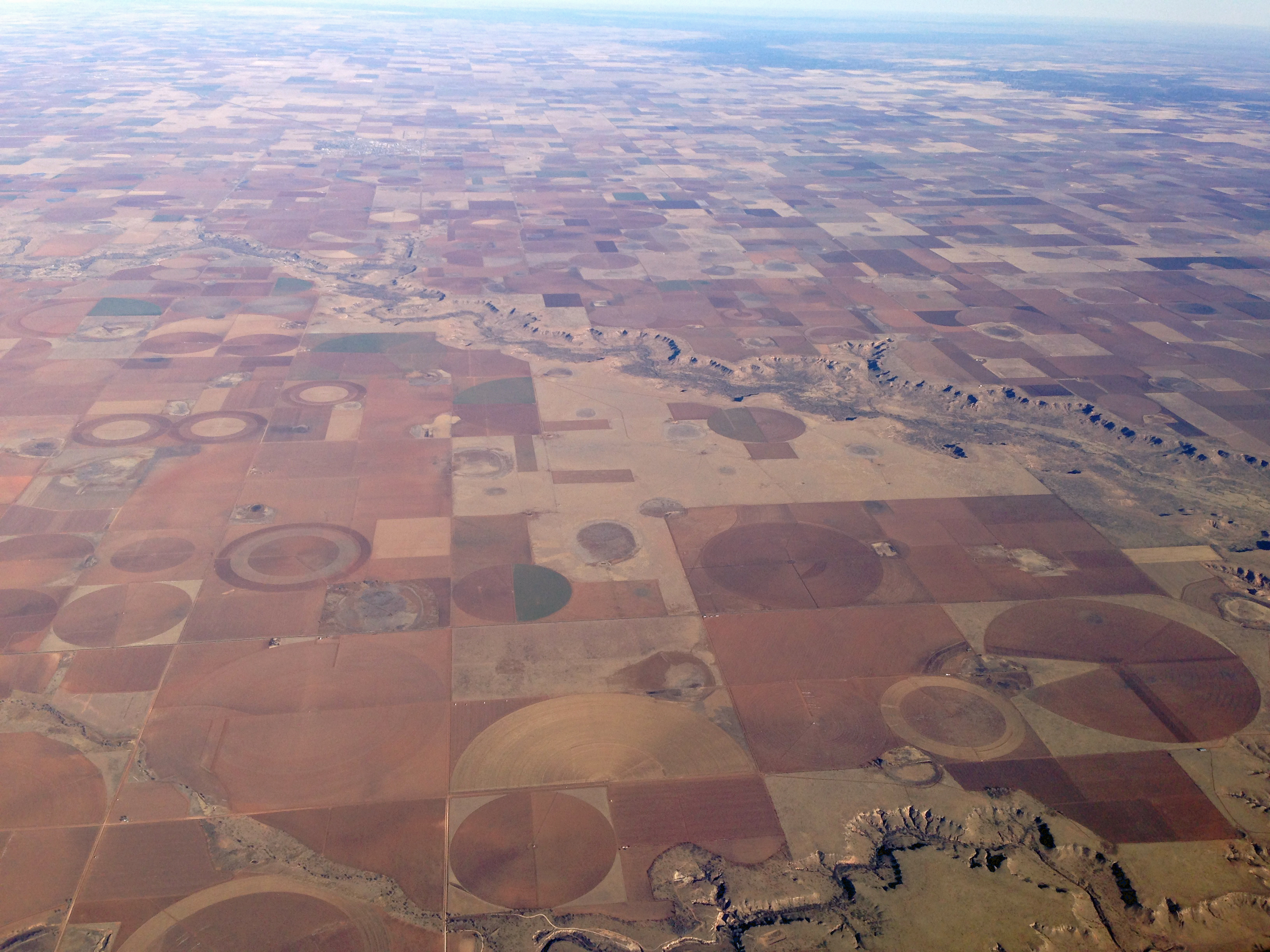
Agricultural land and canyons on the eastern side of the Llano Estacado

The Ogallala Formation is a wedge of sediments built up eastward of the Rocky Mountains as they were uplifted in the Miocene, with the consequent alluvial fans referred to as the "Gangplank". The Ogallala Aquifer is the main freshwater source for the region and consists of braided stream deposits filling in valleys during humid climatic conditions, followed by a sub-humid to arid climate and thick eolian (wind-blown) sand and silt. Caliche layers cap the Ogallala, which reflect today's arid conditions. Pleistocene rainfall over the flat terrain caused water to pond at the surface, resulting in a High Plains characteristic, innumerable round ponds called playa lakes. Spearing goes on to say,

When the weather is dry, they are dusty, round, gray, usually unvegetated flats, as observed from the highway. But after a High Plains thunderstorm, water quickly fills the ponds, only later soaking into the underlying porous sandstones just below the surface to add to the groundwater in the Ogallala aquifer. Early pioneers depended dearly on water from these surface ponds for themselves and their livestock, considering how few streams are on the High Plains. But rains didn't always come, and the ponds dried up frequently. The 20th century has witnessed a concerted effort to tap the more reliable Ogallala water sands. Predictably, the consequent high dependency on groundwater has removed more water than is naturally replaced, raising concern for Panhandle citizens and planners as to future water supplies.

The Pecos and Canadian rivers have eroded the Llano Estacado region down to the Triassic and Permian redbeds resulting in a distinctive color contrast besides separating it from source rocks in the Rocky Mountains.

== Economy ==
The economy of the Llano Estacado is predominantly agricultural, with farming of various crops prevalent, as is cattle ranching. Oil and gas production is also intense throughout the Llano Estacado making it one of the most productive petrochemical areas in the United States.

Overuse of the aquifer in the past has persuaded some farmers to return to dryland crops, leading to less rainwater reaching the playas.

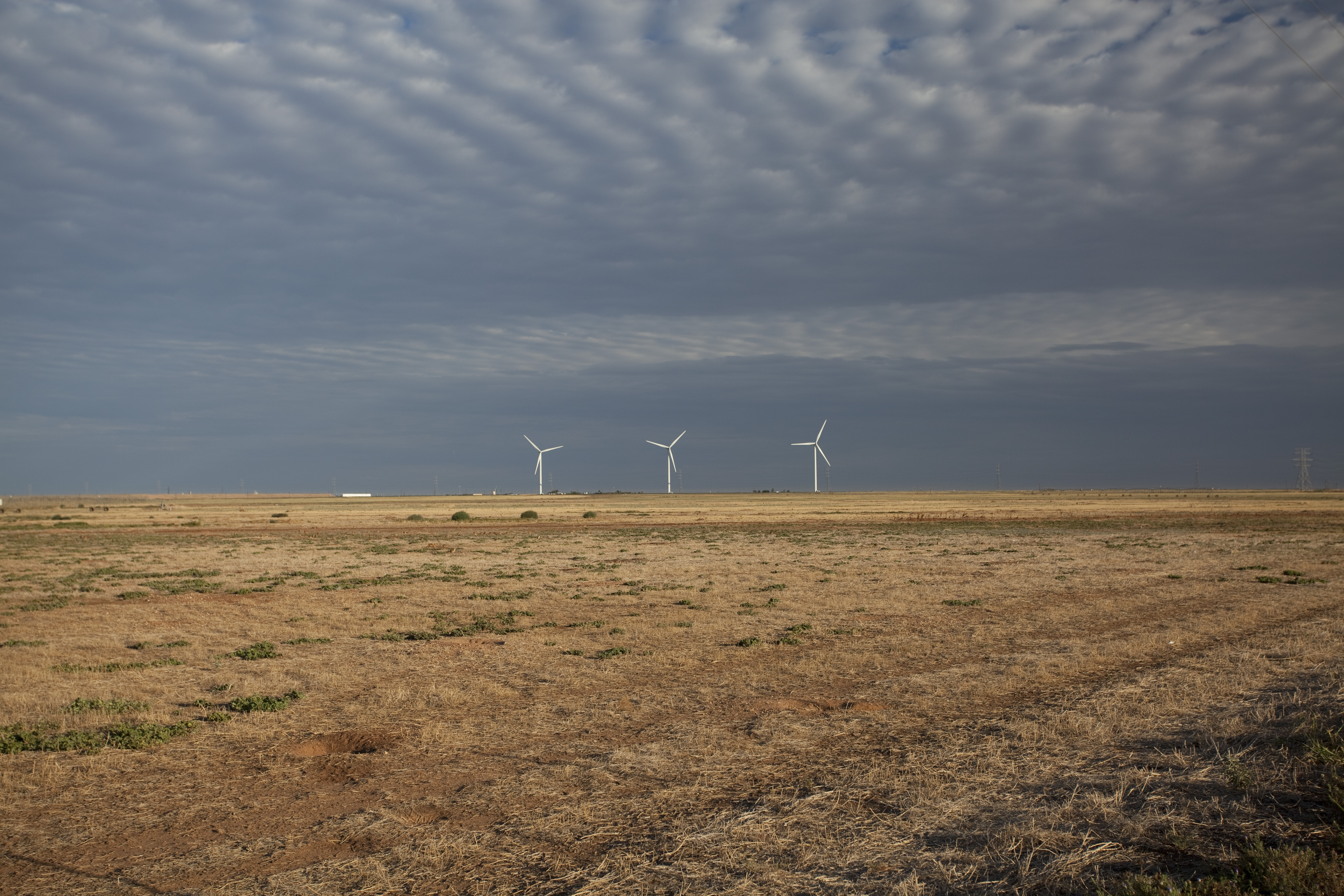
Wind turbines

"Cotton, grain sorghum, corn, wheat, peanuts, sunflowers, grapes, vegetables, and cattle produced in the region literally go around the world. Their economic impact on our area is in the billions of dollars ... and the availability of water is a key factor influencing the region's agribusiness economy."

One of the largest economic drivers on the Llano Estacado is in energy production, with the region experiencing significant activity for producing oil and natural gas associated with the Permian Basin. Additionally, solar and wind farms have proliferated on the Llano Estacado due to the region's dry and windy climate making it a favorable location for the production of renewable energy.

== In popular culture ==
- The 2020 song "West Texas In My Eye" by The Panhandlers features the lyrics, "Where the Llano Estacado rises up to meet the sky/I ain't crying, that's West Texas in my eye."
- María Dolores Gonzales wrote a creative nonfiction memoir about her time in Llano Estacado, called Atop the Windmill: I Could See Forever.
- The region is mentioned in the song "Sweet Amarillo" by the band Old Crow Medicine Show.
- Many works of authors Thomas Mayne Reid and Karl May are set in the Llano Estacado, although the area is described as a sand desert, featuring large stakes marking safe routes. Recurrent dramatic subplots revolve around highwaymen reinstalling some sections of stakes, so the detour would abruptly end in the deep desert, and misled travelers would run out of water, getting weak, sick or even dead, and eventually making an easy prey.
- Americana songwriters David Hanners and Kevin Kadidlo released an EP Llano Estacado in April 2025. The songs all take place on the Llano Estacado, where Hanners once lived.
- The 1999 song "Llano Estocado" by the Texas Panhandle Americana band, Cooder Graw features the lyrics, "I was born on the Llano Estacado." The song was featured on a series of Dodge truck commercials that aired nationwide.
- Gary P. Nunn sings about this region of Texas in his 1984 song “What I like About Texas” , describing the state’s natural landscapes: “Well, you ask me what I like about Texas I tell you it's the wide open spaces, It's everything between the Sabine and the Rio Grande, It's the Llano Estacado, it's the Brazos and the Colorado, It's the spirit of the people who share this land.”

== See also ==
- Caprock Canyons State Park and Trailway
- Caprock Chief
- Canyon Valley
- Double Mountain Fork Brazos River
- Duffy's Peak
- Estacado, Texas
- List of geographical regions in Texas
- Mushaway Peak
- Mount Blanco
- Ogallala Aquifer
- Palo Duro Canyon
- Prairie Dog Town Fork Red River
- Salt Fork Brazos River
- Settles Hotel
- Yellow House Canyon
