= Mushaway Peak =

Mountain in Texas, United States

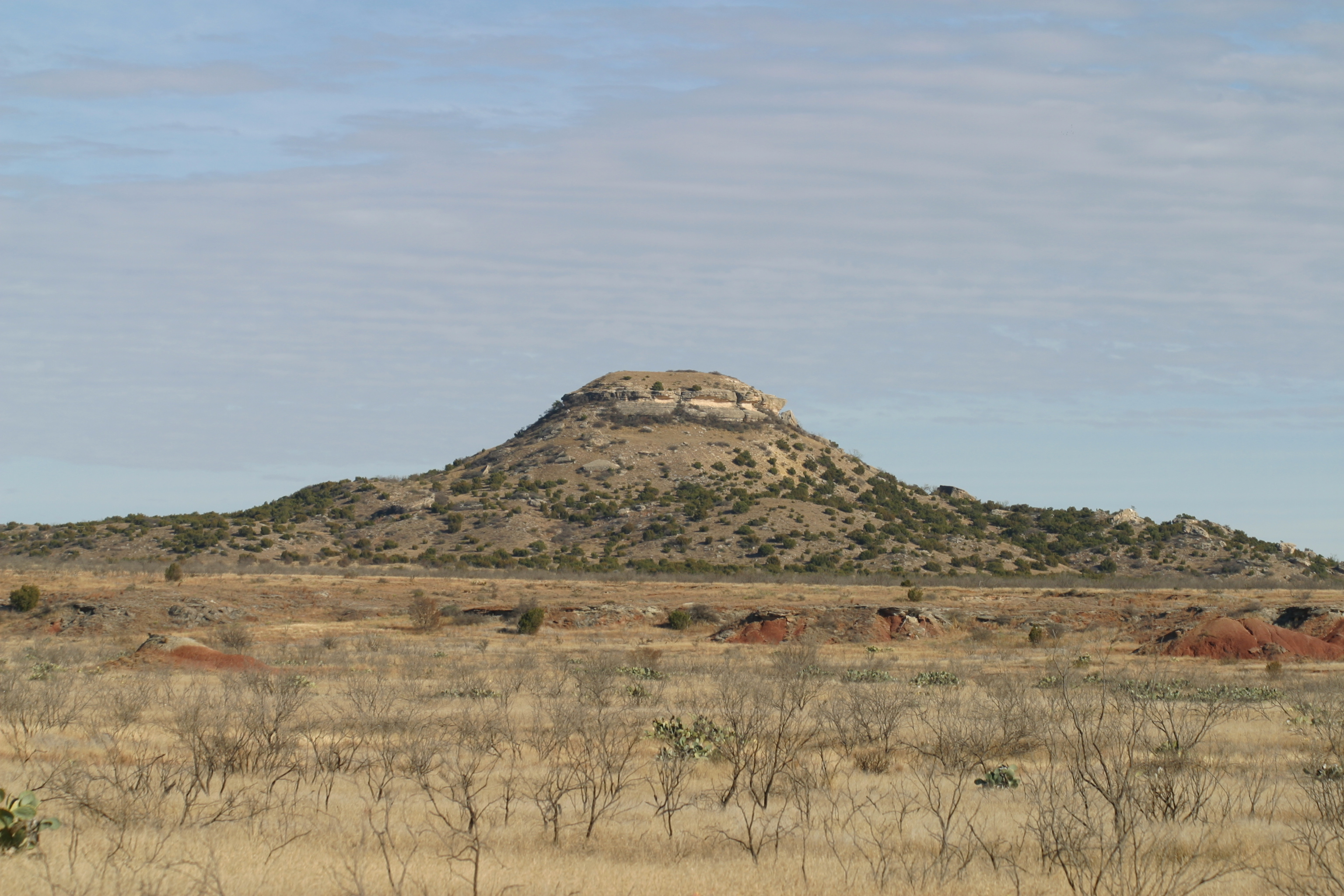
- Mushaway Peak viewed from the west

Highest point
- Elevation: 2,851 ft (869 m)
- Prominence: 380 ft (120 m)
- Coordinates: 32°43′26″N 101°24′03″W

Geography
- Location within Texas
- Topo map: Mushaway Peak Quadrangle

Geology
- Rock age(s): Quaternary, Cretaceous
- Mountain type: Butte

Mushaway Peak is a small but conspicuous butte located 4 mi (6.4 km) southeast of Gail in central Borden County, Texas. It is one of the region's most venerable landmarks.

The summit of this peak rises to an altitude of 2,851 ft (869 m) above sea level, which is roughly the same altitude as the High Plains of the Llano Estacado 10 mi (16 km) to the northwest. Mushaway Peak is in fact an erosional remnant of what was once a much larger Llano Estacado that has gradually retreated by the process of headward erosion. Its resistant cap has protected its underlying sediments, which have remained intact while surrounding sediments have been eroded away by Grape Creek and Bull Creek, two tributaries of the upper Colorado River.

== Proper name ==
Mushaway Peak has been known by various names, including: Cordova Mountain, Cordova Peak, De Corde Peak, Mount Irwin, Mochaquo Mountain, Muchakooago Peak, Mucha Koo Ave, Mucha Kooay Mountain, Muchakooayo Peak, Muchakooay Peak, Mucha Koody Mountain, Mucha Kooga, Muchakooga Peak, Muchakooyo Peak, Mucha Kowa Peak, Mucha Koway Peak, Muchaque Peak, or simply Old Baldy. In a 1936 decision of the United States Board on Geographical Names, "Muchakooay Peak" was recommended as proper orthography. However, the 1936 decision was revised in 1973 when "Mushaway Peak" was selected as the official name of this geographic feature.

== See also ==
- Caprock Escarpment
- Double Mountains (Texas)
- Duffy's Peak
- Kiowa Peak
- Farm to Market Road 669
- Mount Blanco
