= Kiowa Peak (Texas) =

Butte in Texas, United States

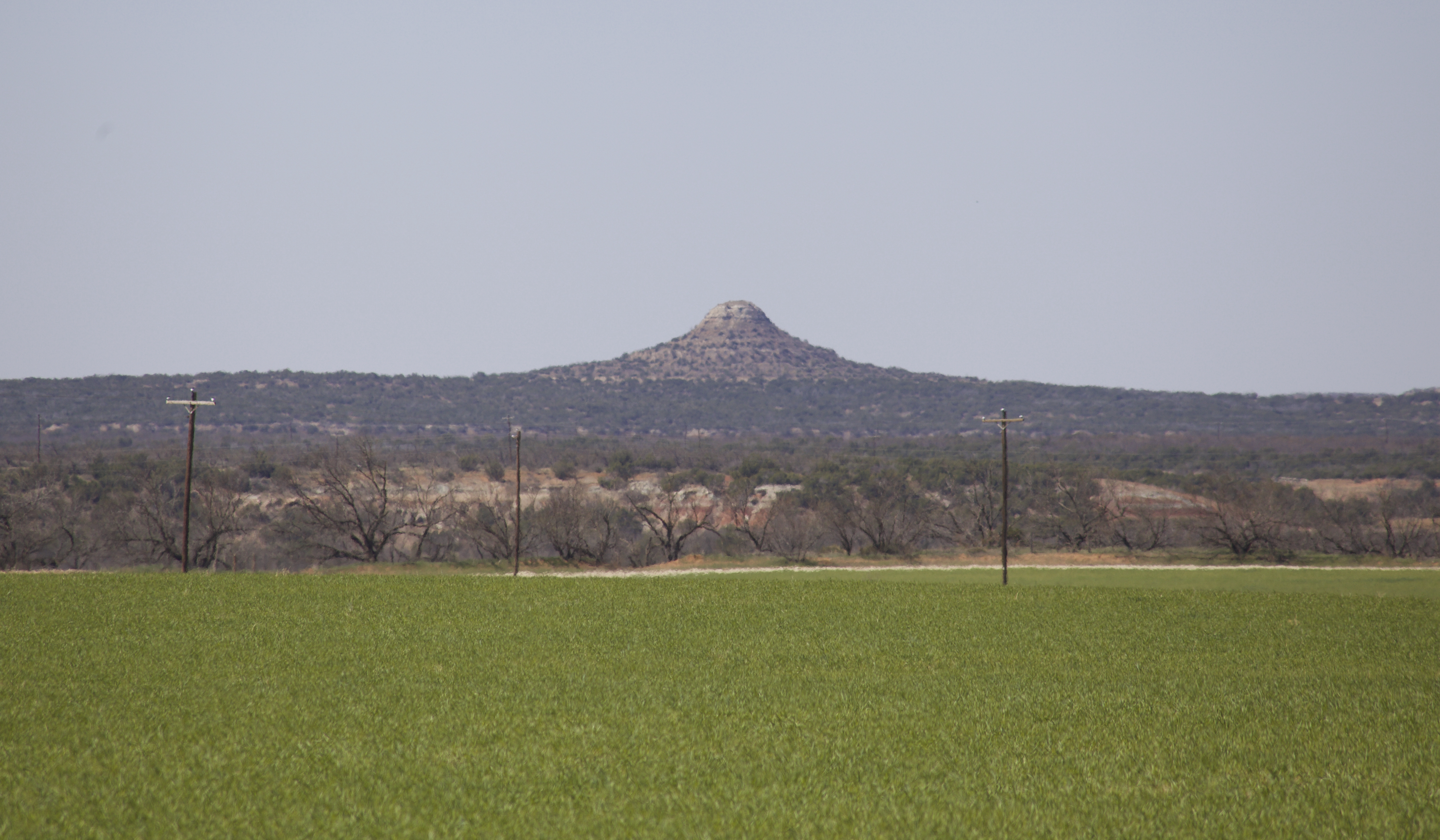
- Kiowa Peak viewed looking west from Farm to Market Road 2279

Highest point
- Elevation: 1,860 ft (570 m)
- Prominence: 250 ft (76 m)
- Coordinates: 33°21′11″N 100°03′13″W

Geography
- Location within Texas
- Location: Location in West Texas
- Topo map: Kiowa Peak

Geology
- Mountain type: Butte

Kiowa Peak is a conspicuous butte located about 3 mi (4.8 km) to the west of the Brazos River in Stonewall County, Texas, US. Kiowa Peak extends less than 300 ft (91 m) above the surrounding landscape, yet despite its small size, it served as an important landmark for Native Americans and early explorers of the region

== Details ==
Kiowa Peak is an erosional remnant located in heavily dissected terrain at the western edge of the Brazos River valley. The soils of the area are shallow clay and sandy loams that support mesquite, yucca, cacti, and sparse grasses. Most of the soils in this region formed in unconsolidated, red, slightly calcareous sediments of Permian age. The local terrain is sparsely populated rangeland, cut by highly intermittent streams such as the Salt Fork Brazos River, North Croton Creek, Wedington Creek and other minor tributaries of the Brazos River. The erosionally resistant sandstones of the peak's cap have protected underlying sediments that have remained intact, while surrounding sediments have eroded away. As a result of this process, Kiowa Peak stands out as a small but relatively prominent landmark that can be seen from a significant distance.

== See also ==
- Double Mountains
- Mount Blanco
- Mushaway Peak
- Duffy's Peak
