= Duffy's Peak =

Mountain in Texas, United States

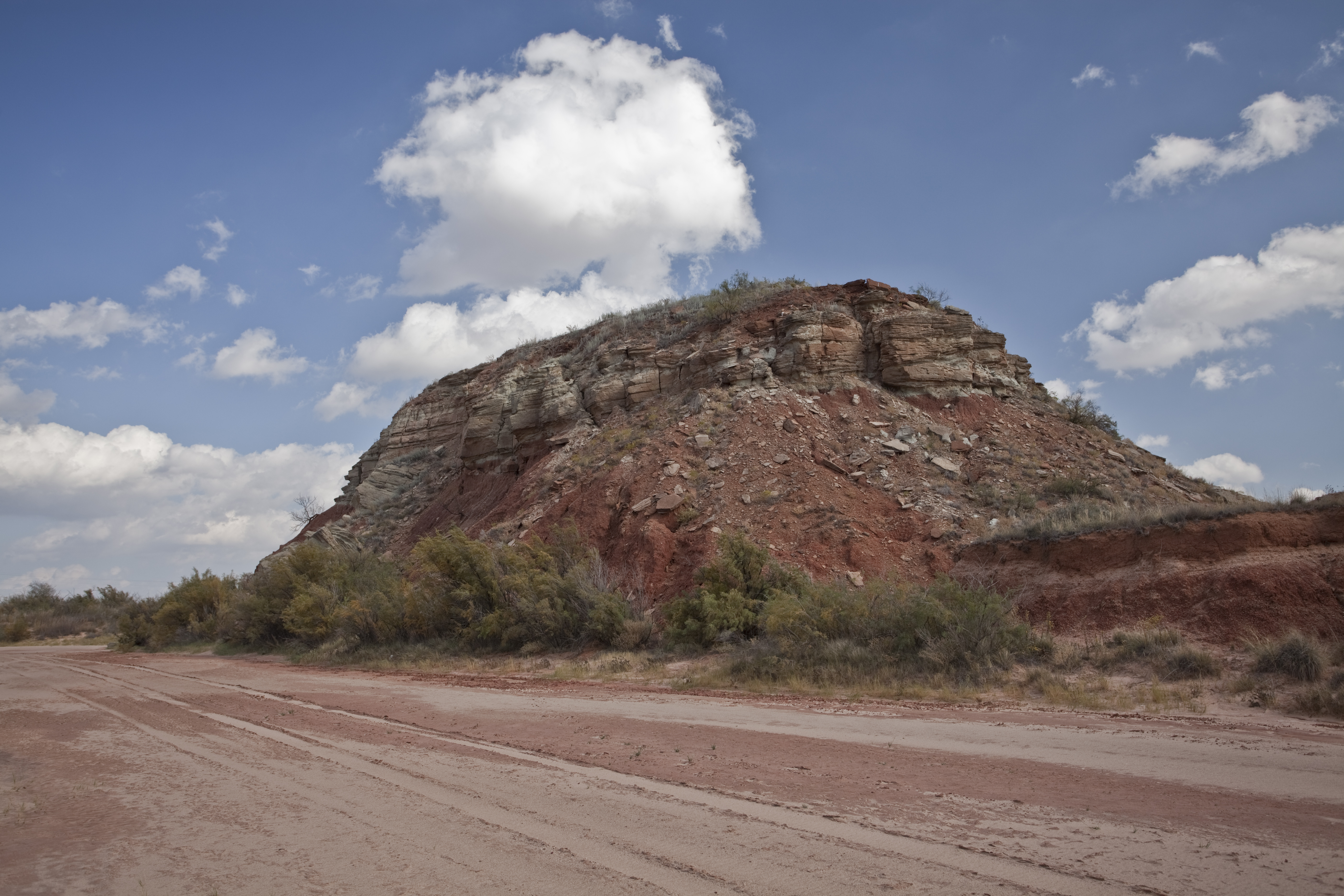
- Duffy's Peak viewed from the Salt Fork.

Highest point
- Elevation: 2,503 ft (763 m)
- Prominence: 58 ft (18 m)
- Coordinates: 33°21′29″N 101°20′32″W

Geography
- Location within Texas
- Location: Location in West Texas
- Topo map: Cap Rock SE

Geology
- Rock age(s): Cretaceous, Triassic
- Mountain type: Butte

Duffy's Peak is a small hill or butte near the Salt Fork Brazos River in Garza County, Texas. Duffy's Peak extends less than 50 ft (15 m) above the river, yet despite its small size, it served as an important landmark for early surveyors of the region and is said to be named for a member of the original survey team who died and was buried nearby in the late 1870s.

Duffy's Peak is located in the rolling plains to the south and east of the Caprock Escarpment of the Llano Estacado. The soils of the area are moderately deep silt loams that support mesquite, yucca, cacti, and grasses. The local terrain is eroded, cut by highly intermittent streams such as the Salt Fork Brazos River, and its tributaries, such as McDonald Creek and Lake Creek. These streams typically flow only during periods of heavy rainfall, when flash floods sweep through the area. The erosionally resistant sandstones of the peak's cap have protected underlying soils that have remained intact, while surrounding sediments have eroded away. As a result of this process, Duffy's Peak now stands out as a small but relatively prominent landmark that can be seen from a significant distance.

In 1969, the Texas Historical Commission erected a historical marker for Duffy's Peak along Texas State Highway 207.

== See also ==
- Double Mountain Fork Brazos River
- Mount Blanco
- Mushaway Peak
- Kiowa Peak
