= Caprock Escarpment =

Geographical transition in Texas and New Mexico

- Escarpment
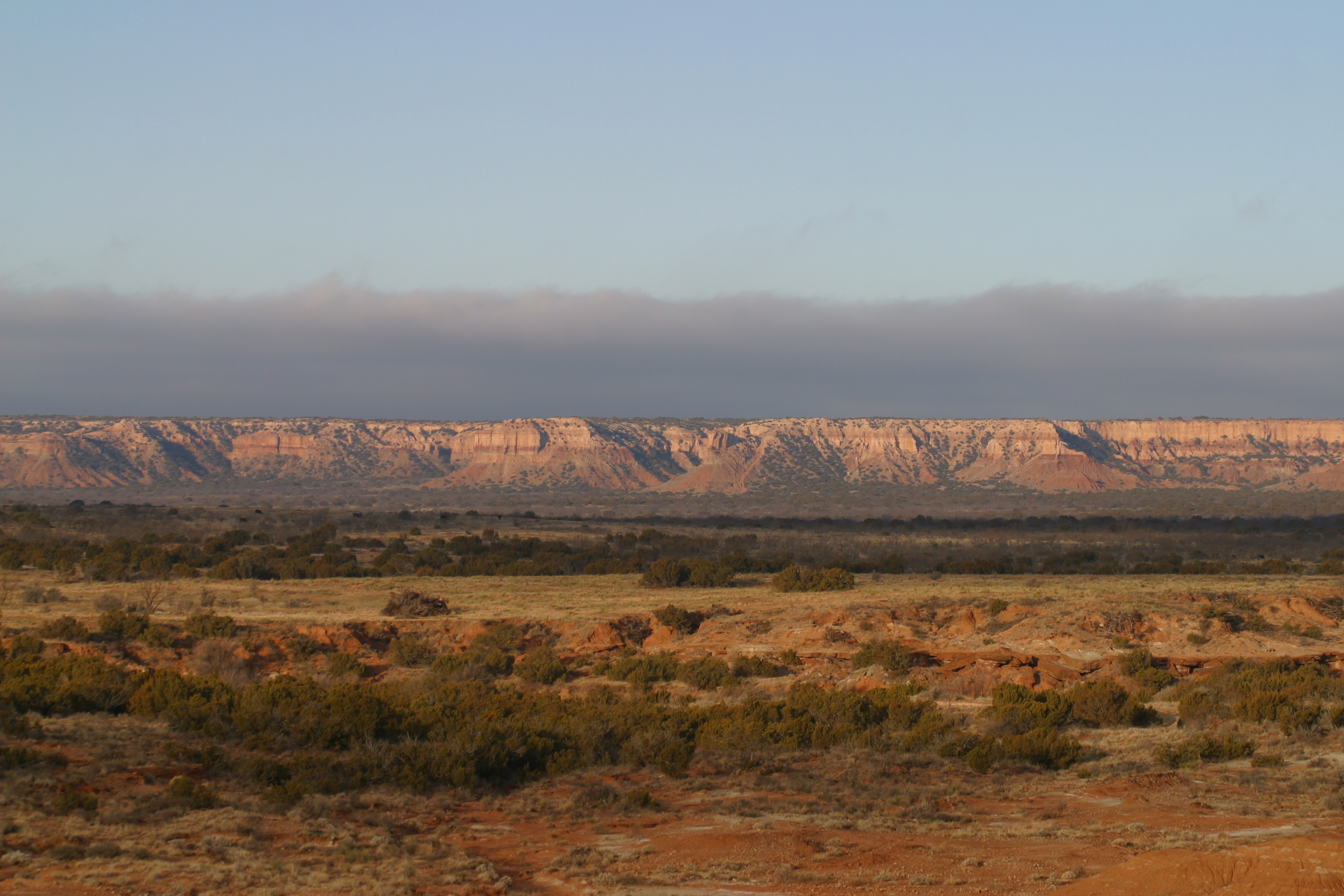
- Caprock Escarpment, Garza County, Texas

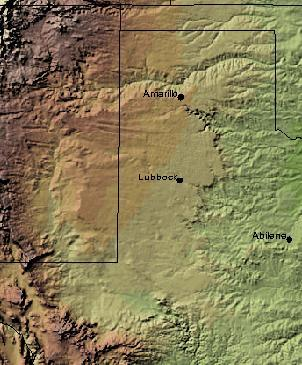
- The Caprock Escarpment marking the edge of the Llano Estacado is clearly visible in this shaded relief image. The escarpment can be seen on the eastern edge of the Llano, running roughly in a north–south line through the middle of the Panhandle of Texas.
- Coordinates: 34°54′35″N 104°04′08″W
- Location: New Mexico and Texas, United States
- Age: Quaternary
- Geology: Caliche
- Elevation: 502 m (1,647 ft)

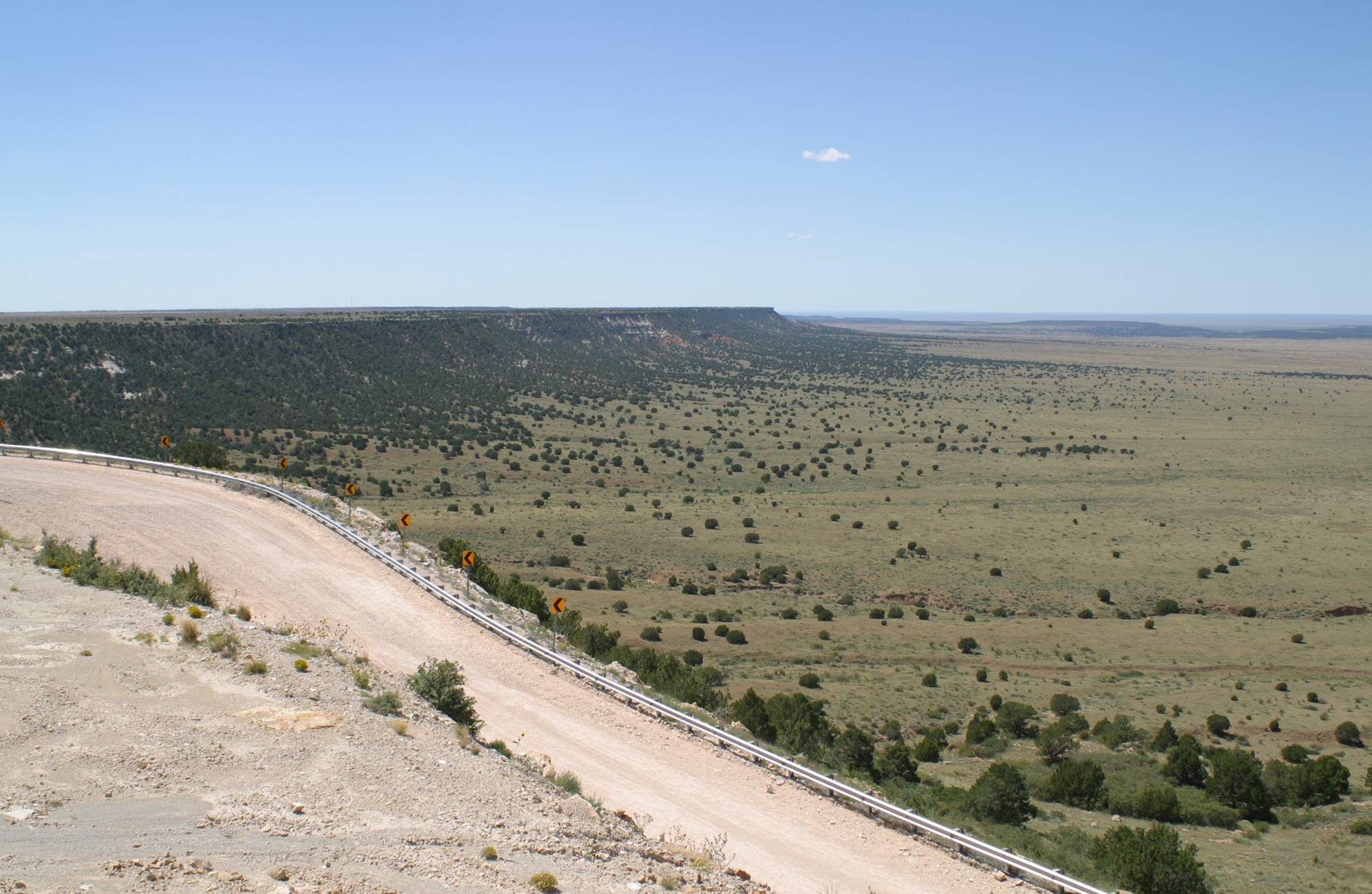
Northwest escarpment of the Llano Estacado overlooking Alamogordo Valley of Quay and Guadalupe Counties, New Mexico.

The Caprock Escarpment is a term used in West Texas and Eastern New Mexico to describe the geographical transition point between the level High Plains of the Llano Estacado and the surrounding rolling terrain.

In Texas, the escarpment stretches around 200 mi (320 km) south-southwest from the northeast corner of the Texas Panhandle near the Oklahoma border. The escarpment is especially notable, from north to south, in Briscoe, Floyd, Motley, Crosby, Dickens, Garza, and Borden Counties.

In New Mexico, a prominent escarpment exists along the northernmost extension of the Llano Estacado, especially to the south of San Jon and Tucumcari, both in Quay County, New Mexico. Along the western edge of the Llano Estacado, the portion of the escarpment that stretches from Caprock to Maljamar, New Mexico is called the Mescalero Ridge.

== Description ==
The escarpment is made of caliche—a layer of calcium carbonate that resists erosion. In some places, the escarpment rises around 1,000 ft (300 m) above the plains to the east. The escarpment's features formed by erosion from rivers and streams, creating arroyos and highly diverse terrain, including the large Palo Duro Canyon southeast of Amarillo, Texas. One will notice the change in elevation of several hundred feet while crossing the Caprock Escarpment on Interstate 40 between Adrian, Texas and San Jon, New Mexico.

The overall slight upslope, and in some areas, convergent, terrain of the Caprock is implicated in altering local weather and climate, such as enhancing precipitation and promoting thunderstorm initiation and organization.

== Parks ==
Caprock Canyons State Park and Trailway, located near Quitaque, Texas, opened in 1982. A 65-mi (105-km) trail was developed within the park in 1992. Along the trail is Clarity Tunnel, home to a large colony of Mexican free-tailed bats.

== See also ==
- Blanco Canyon
- Canyon Valley
- Caprock Chief
- Double Mountain Fork
- Duffy's Peak
- Eastern New Mexico
- List of escarpments
- Geographical regions in Texas
- Little Red River
- Mount Blanco
- Mushaway Peak
- Palmer Divide
- Palo Duro Canyon
- Prairie Dog Town Fork Red River
- Ransom Canyon
- Salt Fork Brazos River
- Yellow House Canyon
- West Texas
