= Double Mountains (Texas) =

Mountains in Texas, United States

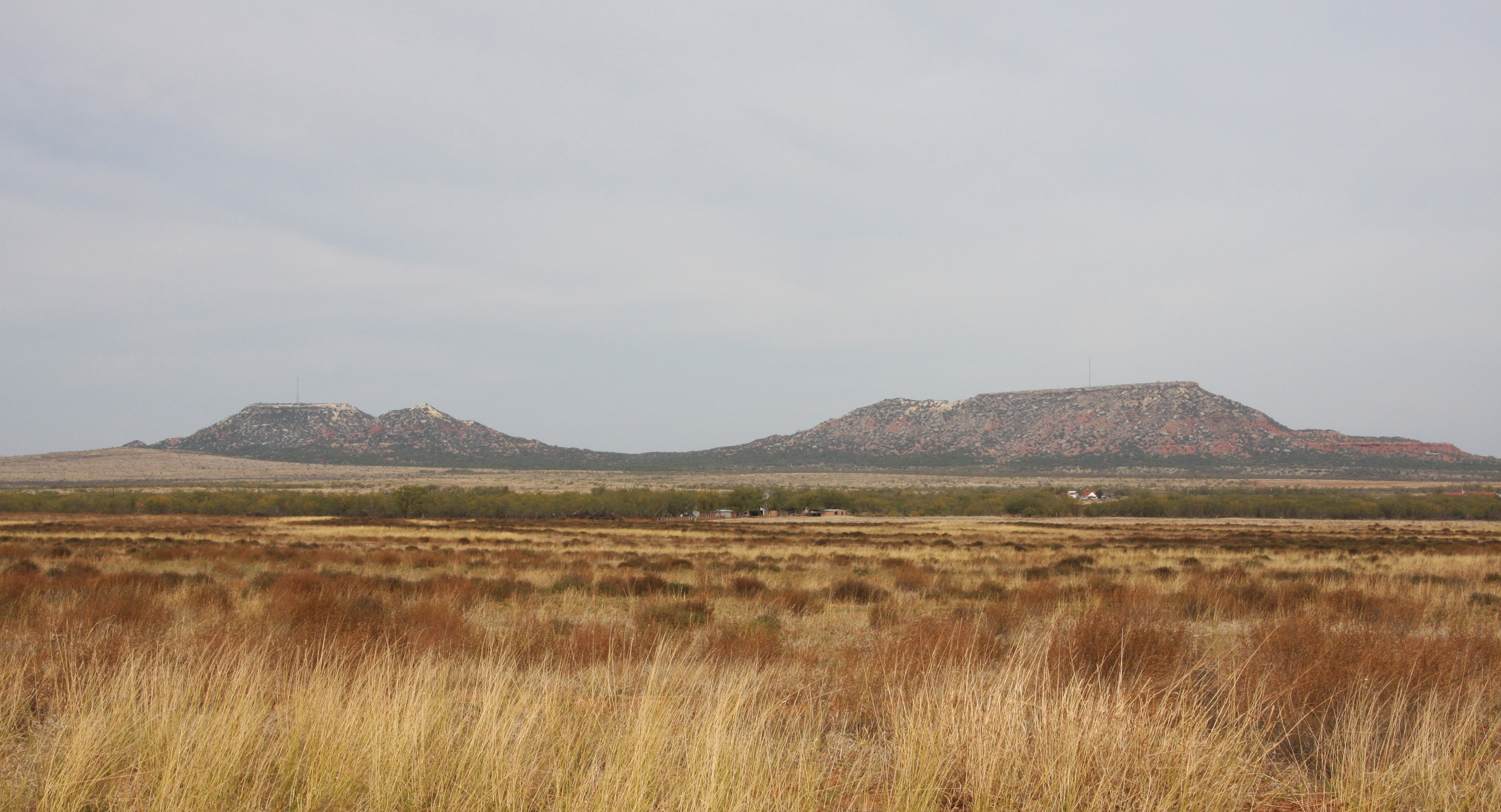
- Double Mountains, viewed from the south

Highest point
- Elevation: 2580+ feet (786+ m)
- Prominence: 540 ft (160 m)
- Coordinates: 33°03′44″N 100°27′15″W

Geography
- Location within Texas
- Location: Stonewall County, Texas, U.S.
- Parent range: Plains of Central Texas
- Topo map: USGS Double Mountains

Geology
- Rock age: Cretaceous (Comanche Series)
- Mountain type: Erosional remnant

Climbing
- Easiest route: Drive/hike

Double Mountains is the name of a pair of flat-topped buttes located 13 miles (21 km) southwest of Aspermont in Stonewall County, Texas. While the Handbook of Texas gives their elevation as either 2,000 ft (610 m) or 2,400 ft (732 m), United States Geological Survey maps give the elevation of the western mountain as 2,523 ft (769 m) and that of the eastern mountain as between 2,580 and 2,600 ft (786 and 792 m). Together, the mountains form part of the high ground dividing the watersheds of the Salt Fork and Double Mountain Fork Brazos River.

Rising some 500–800 feet (150–250 m) above the surrounding plains, the higher eastern mountain is the highest point in Stonewall County and the most topographically prominent point for almost 160 miles (257 km), the nearest more prominent peak being Mount Scott in Oklahoma. As such an isolated geographical feature, the mountains are visible from a great distance, and feature commanding views from their tops.

Their prominence has long made them important regional landmarks, dating back at least to 1788, when Jose Mares opened a trail from San Antonio to Santa Fe; thereafter, the mountains were waymarkers "for every westward expedition and a rendezvous for buffalo hunters." They were also cited by the surveying party of Randolph B. Marcy in 1849.

Although paved roads do not lead directly to the mountains, they are accessible via paved Farm to Market Roads 2211 and 610 and dirt county roads; a steep dirt road leads up to the summit of each of the pair of mountains. A prominent radio tower stands on the eastern summit.

At one time, Comanche leader Quanah Parker and his band lived on or near the mountains, and according to one source, the mountains were once a sacred place to the Comanches.

== Town of Double Mountain ==
A town of Double Mountain once existed a few miles north of the hills. Established in 1886, the community featured a post office, sheriff, schoolhouse, and Methodist and Baptist churches for several years in the late 19th and early 20th centuries, but had become a ghost town by the 1980s.

== See also ==
- Blanco Canyon
- Brazos River
- Double Mountain Fork Brazos River
- Duffy's Peak
- Kiowa Peak
- Geology of Texas
- Mushaway Peak
- North Fork Double Mountain Fork Brazos River
- Rath City, Texas
- Salt Fork Brazos River
- West Texas
- Yellow House Canyon
