= Salt Fork Brazos River =

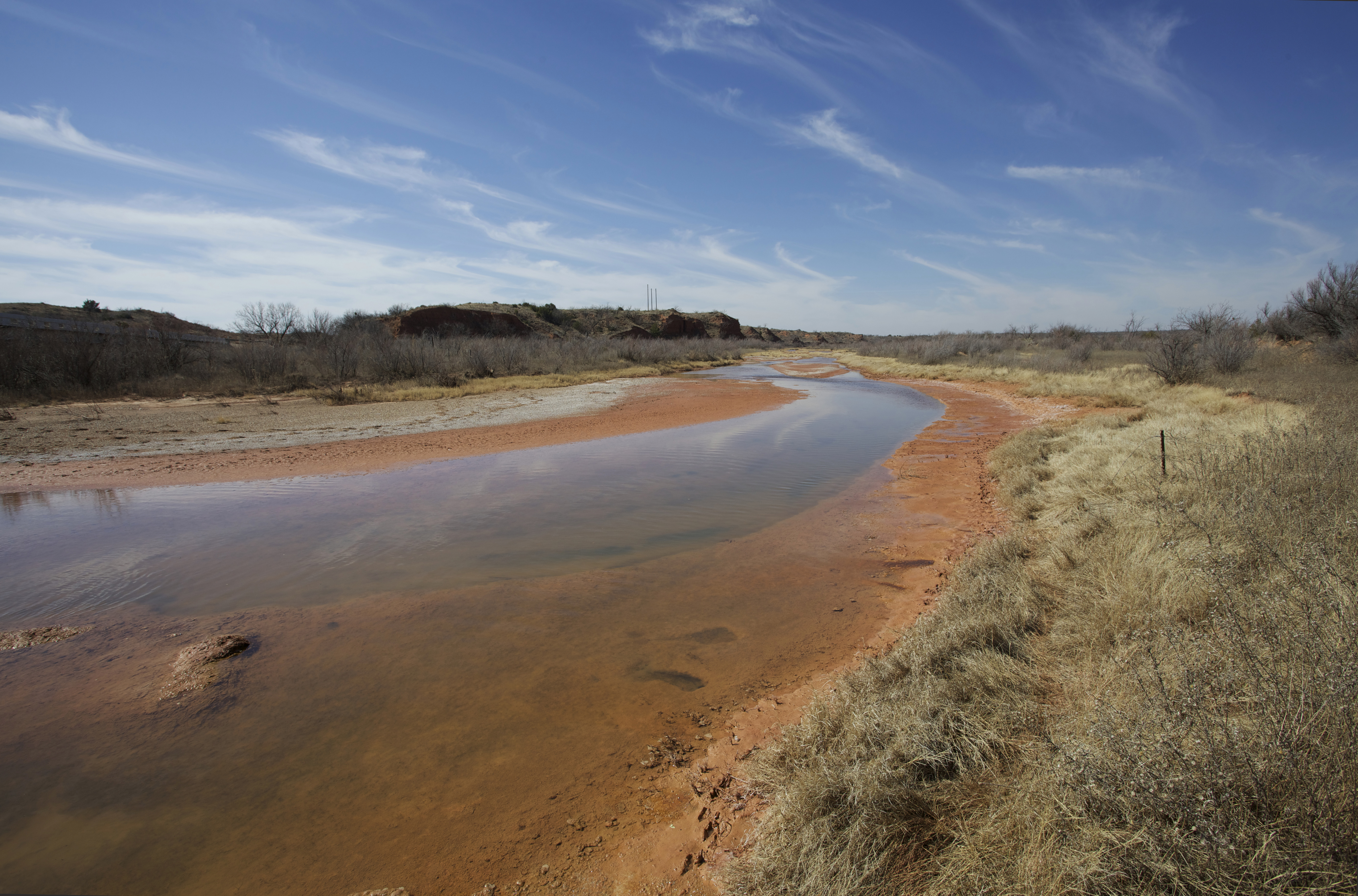
- Salt Fork in Kent County, Texas

Physical characteristics
- Source
  - location: Crosby County, Texas
  - coordinates: 33.477133°N 101.422361°W
  - elevation: 3,027 ft (923 m)
- Mouth
  - location: Stonewall County, Texas
  - coordinates: 33.2675°N 100.010556°W
  - elevation: 1,483 ft (452 m)
- Length: 150 mi (240 km)
- Basin size: 2,150 sq mi (5,600 km^{2})

Basin features
- River system: Brazos

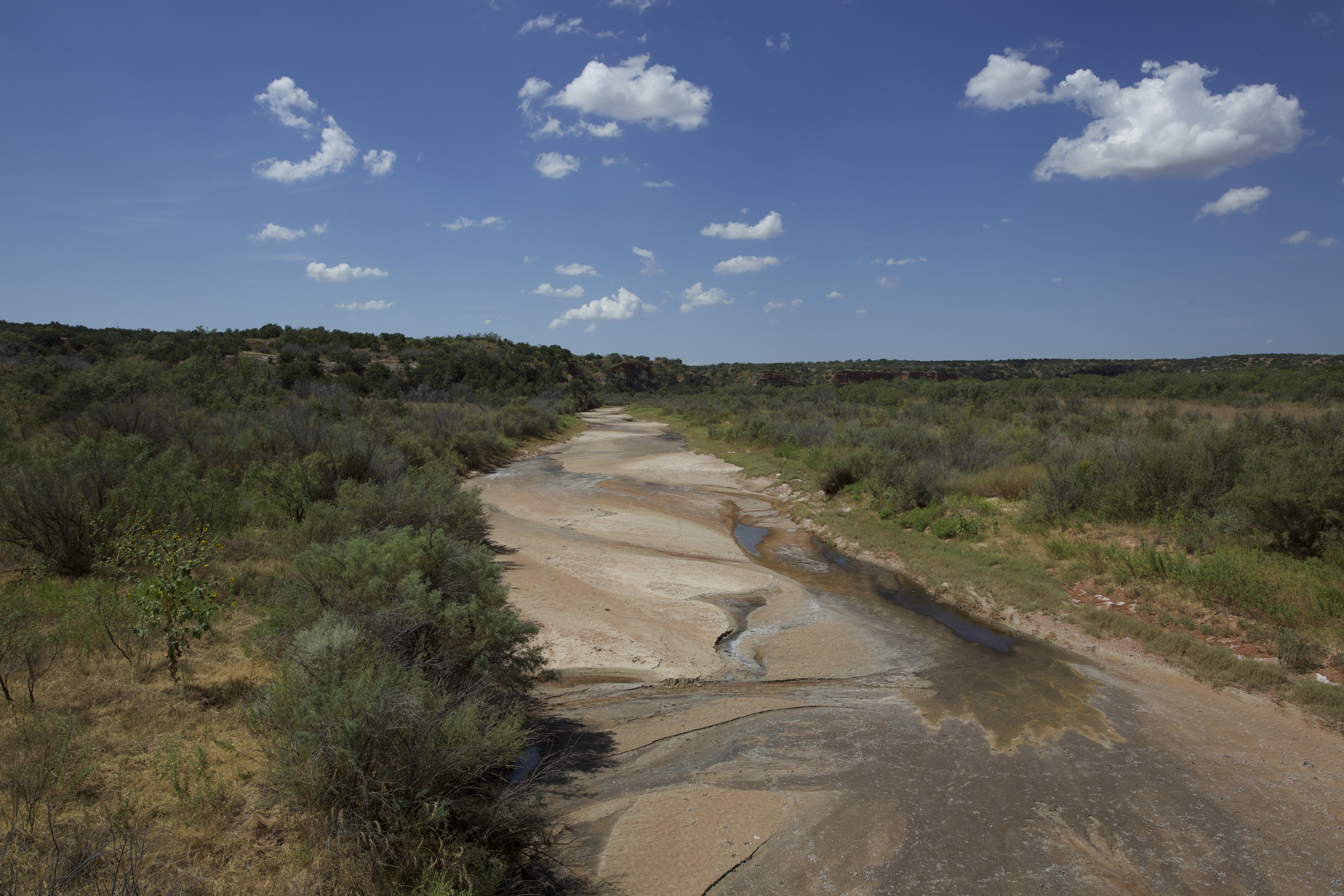
Salty bed of an often dry Salt Fork.

The Salt Fork Brazos River is a braided, highly intermittent stream about 150 mi (240 km) long, heading along the edge of the Llano Estacado about 26 mi (42 km) east-southeast of Lubbock, Texas. From its source, it flows generally east-southeastward to join the Double Mountain Fork to form the Brazos River about 18 mi (29 km) west-northwest of Haskell, Texas. The Salt Fork stretches across portions of Crosby, Garza, Kent, and Stonewall counties of West Texas.

== Geography ==
The Salt Fork Brazos River begins as a dry channel (draw) near the edge of the Llano Estacado in Crosby County, about 1.8 mi (2.9 km) southwest of the cotton gin in the small farming community of Cap Rock, Texas. From the edge of the Caprock Escarpment, the stream channel generally runs southeastward across southern Crosby County, passing to the east of Courthouse Mountain and crossing Texas State Highway 207. It passes to the west of the mostly abandoned community of Canyon Valley and then crosses into the thinly populated ranch country of northern Garza County. After passing Duffy's Peak and then crossing Farm to Market Road 651, the Salt Fork merges with McDonald Creek, a few miles north of Verbena, Texas. The stream then begins tending in a more easterly direction as it meanders wildly, eventually crossing from Garza into Kent County, where it merges with the White River just before it passes beneath Farm to Market Road 1081. The stream continues to meander as it crosses Texas State Highway 208 north of Clairemont and U.S. Highway 380 to the southwest of Jayton. After passing into Stonewall County, the Salt Fork turns sharply to the north, where it again crosses Highway 380 and passes to the north of Peacock and Swenson. The stream is directed north by the high ground that surrounds Double Mountains, a pair of flat-topped hills located 13 mi (21 km) southwest of Aspermont, Texas. Double Mountain divides the watersheds of the Salt Fork to the north and the Double Mountain Fork to the south. Finally, at the eastern edge of Stonewall County, about 3 miles (4.8 km) west of the ghost town of Jud or about 15 mi (24 km) to the northeast of Aspermont, the Salt Fork merges with the Double Mountain Fork to form the Brazos River.

Overall, the Salt Fork descends 1,544 ft (471 m) from its headwaters to its confluence with the Double Mountain Fork, passing through flat to moderately steep terrain along its course.

== Proper name ==
According to a 1964 decision by the United States Board on Geographical Names, this tributary of the Brazos is properly called the Salt Fork Brazos River, and should not be called the Salt Fork of the Brazos River.

== See also ==
- Blanco Canyon
- Caprock Escarpment
- List of rivers of Texas
