= Braination =

Public charter school operator in Texas

Braination is a non-profit educational organization headquartered in San Antonio, Texas.

It was established in 1998 as the Educational Resource Center dba John H. Wood Jr. Public Charter District (JHW) and originally only operated disciplinary schools for youth who were being accused by the court system of juvenile delinquency. It also operates an open-enrollment public charter school (Anne Frank Inspire Academy) and a private school (The Global Village - An International Academy) in San Antonio.

By 2013 the organization had the name Educational Resource Center.

== Operations ==
Its headquarters were previously at 3201 Cherry Ridge. They are now located at 10325 Bandera Road, San Antonio, TX 78250.

== Schools ==
Braination operates one private school, seven closed enrollment residential public charter schools, one open-enrollment public charter school and two partnership schools.

Private schools

- The Global Village, An International Academy of San Antonio

Open-enrollment public charter schools

- Anne Frank Inspire Academy (San Antonio)

Boarding schools which include facilities in juvenile correctional facilities and foster care facilities.

- Afton Oaks / Hector Garza Residential Treatment Center in San Antonio
- Bell County
- Hays County
  - At Hays County Juvenile Detention Center in San Marcos
- Legacy Ranch
- Meridell
- Rockdale
  - At Rockdale Regional Juvenile Detention Center
- Williams House

Former campuses

- Granbury Campus - At Granbury Regional Juvenile Detention Center
- Huebner Campus - At Texas Adolescent Treatment Center (TATC) in San Antonio

As of 2013 Braination receives more taxpayer funds for its residential schools compared to regular charter schools, and its lack of need to pay facility costs such as rent allowed the district to, by 2013, amass $4.5 million in savings that allowed it to open other types of schools.

It has a partnership with Brewer Academy, which Braination operates but is owned by the San Antonio Independent School District (SAISD); and another with Karnes County Newcomers School, the latter serving people interned in the Karnes City, Texas Immigration and Customs Enforcement (ICE) facility. The Karnes contract is with GEO Group. The Karnes City facility serves family groups seeking asylum on an as-needed basis.

The district previously operated a residential school at the Garza County Juvenile Detention Center in Post, Texas, but announced plans to close it in 2013 as the State of Texas at the time limited the number of schools that the district may operate to six, and Braination had plans to open the Anne Frank non-residential charter school in San Antonio. Therefore, the Post Independent School District became the new education provider for that detention facility. The state identification number of the former Post school was given to Frank.

The John H. Wood, Jr. Charter School System reopened the former St. Francis Academy as a charter school in 2003. It closed at a later point.

=== International Academy of San Antonio ===
International Academy of San Antonio is a private school, initially with elementary grades only, that opened in 2019. Braination decided to make it a private school instead of a charter school so that it can use the Common Ground Collaborative program without having a conflict with Texas standardized testing practices used in district public and charter schools. The preliminary enrollment for fall 2019 was around 100. Its facility was previously used by the Eleanor Kolitz Hebrew Language Academy, and is on the property of the San Antonio Jewish Community Harry and Jeanette Weinberg Campus. The first principal is Raul Hinojosa. Bruce Rockstroh, the CEO and superintendent of Braination, stated that the funds for this school are separate from the charter school finances. In 2019 the school planned to charge $12,000 per year per student.
