= Justiceburg, Texas =

- Unincorporated community
- Location within the state of Texas Justiceburg (the United States)
- Coordinates: 33°2′31″N 101°12′11″W
- Country: United States
- State: Texas
- County: Garza
- Time zone: UTC-6 (Central (CST))
  - Summer (DST): UTC-5 (CDT)

Justiceburg is an unincorporated community in Garza County, Texas, United States. It is located along the Double Mountain Fork Brazos River, 15 miles (24 km) southeast of the county seat, Post.

== Geography ==
Justiceburg is located at 33°02′29″N 101°12′12″W (33.042072, -101.202992), in southeastern Garza County. It is approximately 55 miles (89 km) to the southeast of central Lubbock and 110 miles (180 km) northwest of Abilene.

== History ==
Justiceburg is located around the site of a town originally known as LeForrest (variously spelled Le Forest) and had a post office of that name from 1902 until 1905.

In 1910, a rancher named Jefferson Davis Justice then bought the land, and granted the Atchison, Topeka and Santa Fe Railroad right of way. LeForrest became Justiceburg in honor of this development; the railroad was then completed in 1911.

Justiceburg has remained a small village throughout its history, with the population fluctuating between 25 and 76; in the 1980s, many of these residents were reportedly descendants of Jefferson Davis Justice. At one time, many thought the town of Justiceburg would become a regional hub for commerce. While this never materialized, some still maintain this vision that someday Justiceburg will become the next boomtown, including local folk-hero meteorologist John Robison from Lubbock TV station KCBD.

The town once had a functioning schoolhouse and railroad depot; these have since been abandoned, as have several homes. The area of town to the east of U.S. Route 84 contains the town's church; the area to the west has most of the buildings, inhabited or otherwise.

Justiceburg has been featured in the book "More Ghost Towns of Texas" by T. Lindsay Baker. The dereliction of many of the buildings gives Justiceburg a ghost town feel, even though some still live there.

== Notable person ==
Former Major League Baseball player Norm Cash was born in Justiceburg.

== Demographics ==
The population of the ZIP code area (79330) around Justiceburg in the 2000 census was 60.

== Economy ==
As of 1997, there was one retail operation and no manufacturing concerns in the area bound by the local zip code.

The railroad, now part of the BNSF network, still runs through Justiceburg.

== Gallery ==
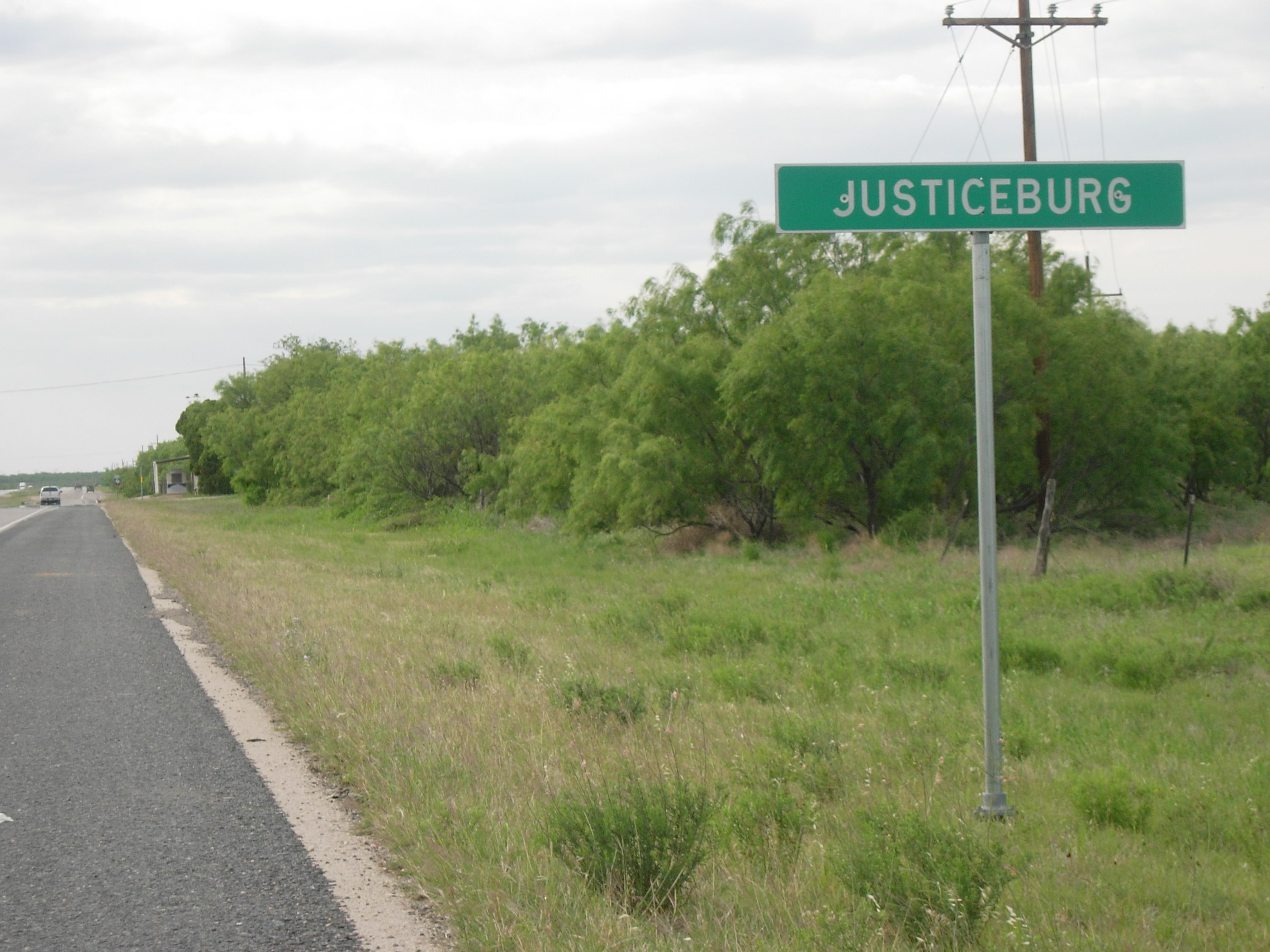
Roadsign welcoming travelers to Justiceburg.

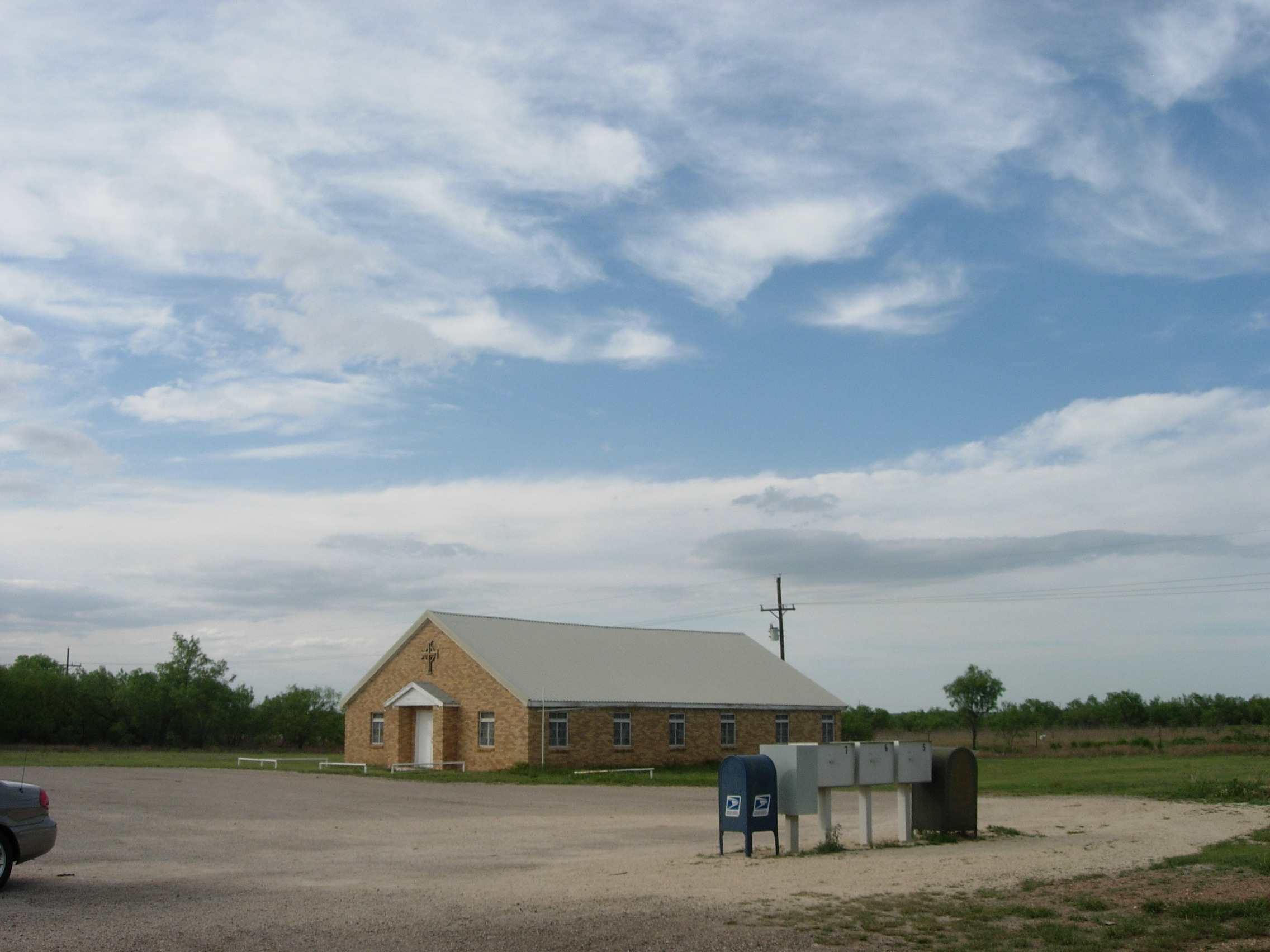
The church by the westbound side of US Highway 84.

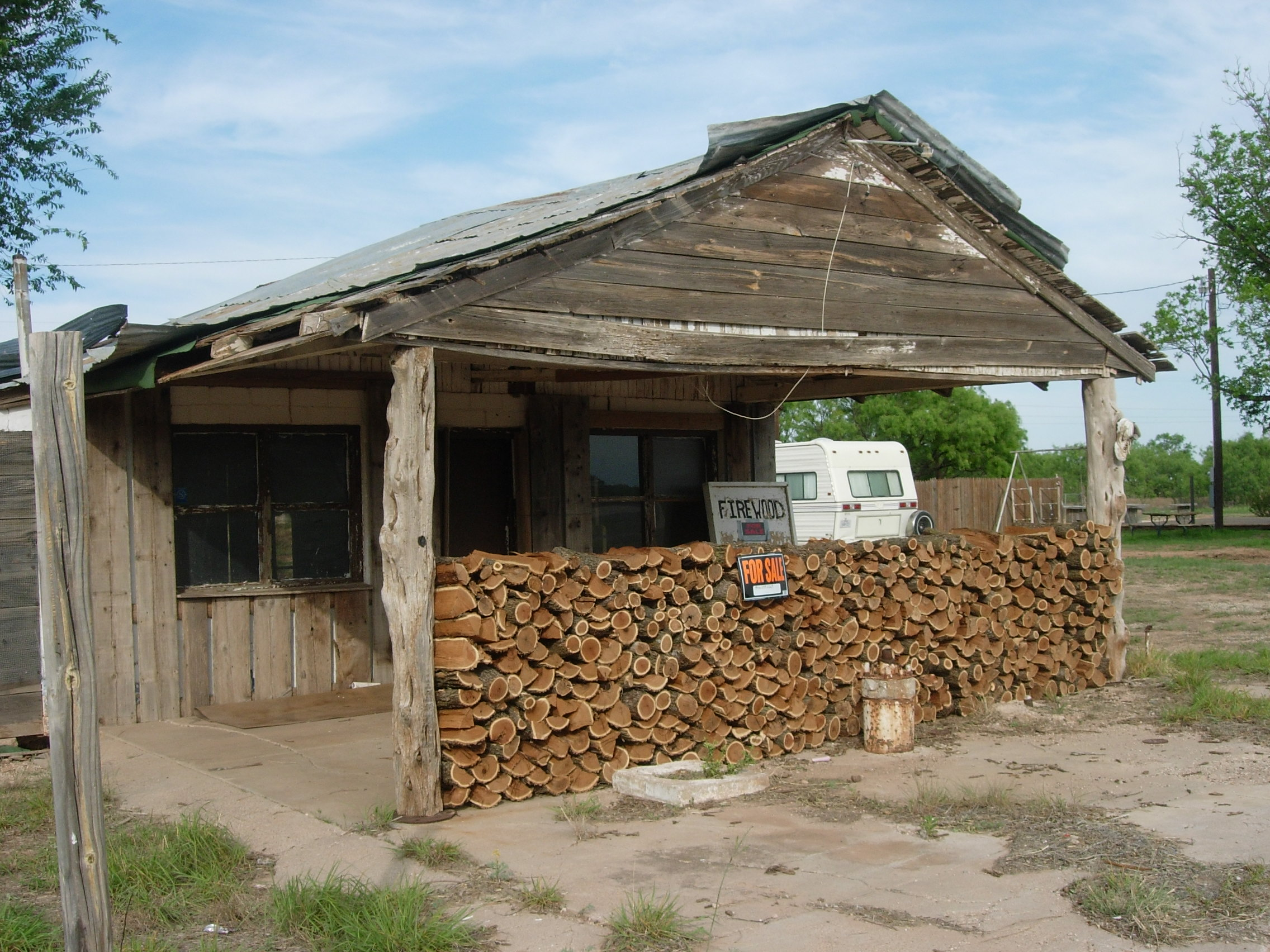
Firewood for sale at Justiceburg, Texas.

== See also ==
- Caprock Escarpment
- Close City, Texas
- Llano Estacado
- Southland, Texas
- West Texas
