= Giles W. Dalby Correctional Institution =

Prison in Post, Texas, United States

Coordinates: 33°12′04″N 101°22′24″W

Giles W. Dalby Unit
- Interactive map of Giles W. Dalby Unit
- Location: 805 N Avenue F Post, Texas, U.S.
- Status: open
- Capacity: 1921
- Opened: 1999
- Managed by: Texas Department of Criminal Justice

The Giles W. Dalby Unit is a prison unit located in Post, Garza County, Texas. Originally a privately operated jail operated by the Management and Training Corporation under contract with the state of Texas The facility from 1999 to 2024 was called Giles W. Dalby Correctional Institution.

== Opening ==
It opened in 1999, housed state detainees, and had a working capacity of 1776. The facility was named after Garza County Judge Giles Dalby who helped establish the prison in the area.

== Foreclosure ==
In August 2016, Justice Department officials announced that the FBOP would be phasing out its use of contracted facilities, on the grounds that private prisons provided less safe and less effective services with no substantial cost savings. The agency expects to allow current contracts on its thirteen remaining private facilities to expire. The facility closed on September 30, 2024.

== Reopening ==
The Giles W. Dalby Correctional Facility was purchased the Texas Department of Criminal Justice, thanks to $110 million allocated by the 89th Legislature. Garza County Judge Lee Norman mentioned that the sale is being finalized by attorneys. The facility, previously leased to various operators, used to be the county's biggest source of income and employment until its closure in September 2024, which resulted in over 100 job losses. Judge Norman noted that about 110 former employees have expressed interest in when the facility reopens, as of August 2025 the Texas Department of Criminal Justice (TDCJ) is actively hiring from that list. The unit reopened February 24th 2026 under the Texas Department of Criminal Justice.The unit is focusing on rehabilitation, addiction recovery, and workforce skills training.
