= National Register of Historic Places listings in Garza County, Texas =

Location of Garza County in Texas

This is a list of the National Register of Historic Places listings in Garza County, Texas.

This is intended to be a complete list of properties listed on the National Register of Historic Places in Garza County, Texas. There are six properties listed on the National Register in the county, and one former listing. Two properties are Recorded Texas Historic Landmarks while the former property is a State Antiquities Landmark.

The publicly disclosed locations of National Register properties may be seen in a mapping service provided.

This National Park Service list is complete through NPS recent listings posted March 21, 2025.

== Current listings ==
	Name on the Register	Image	Date listed	Location	City or town	Description
1	Cooper's Canyon Site 41 GR 25	Cooper's Canyon Site 41 GR 25	November 7, 1978 (#78002933)	Address restricted	Post	
2	Garza County Courthouse	Garza County Courthouse	November 21, 2001 (#01001266)	300 W. Main St. 33°11′27″N 101°22′53″W	Post	Recorded Texas Historic Landmark
3	O.S. Ranch Petroglyphs 41 GR 57	O.S. Ranch Petroglyphs 41 GR 57	January 31, 1978 (#78002934)	Address restricted	Post	
4	Old Post Sanitarium	Old Post Sanitarium	May 21, 1975 (#75001984)	117 North Ave. N 33°11′31″N 101°23′01″W	Post	Recorded Texas Historic Landmark
5	Post West Dugout	Post West Dugout	May 22, 1978 (#78002935)	Address restricted	Post	
6	Post-Montgomery Site 41 GR 188	Post-Montgomery Site 41 GR 188	November 7, 1978 (#78002936)	Address restricted	Post	

== Former listing ==
	Name on the Register	Image	Date listed	Date removed	Location	City or town	Description
1	Old Algerita Hotel	Old Algerita Hotel	April 23, 1975 (#75001983)	February 23, 2015	S corner of Main and Ave. I 33°11′27″N 101°22′37″W	Post	State Antiquities Landmark. Demolished in November, 2014.

== See also ==
- National Register of Historic Places listings in Texas
- Recorded Texas Historic Landmarks in Garza County
