= Anne Frank Inspire Academy =

Public K-12 charter school in Texas

Coordinates: 29.54722°N 98.65984°W

Location
- 10325 Bandera Road; San Antonio, Texas 78250; United States

Information
- Established: 2014; 12 years ago
- Locale: Urban
- NCES District ID: 4800053
- Educational authority: Texas Education Agency
- CEEB code: 440418
- NCES School ID: 480005313163
- Director: Sedrick Keyes (6-12)
- Teaching staff: 27.96 (FTE)
- Grades: K-12
- Enrollment: 608 (2024-2025)
  - Kindergarten: 59
  - Grade 1: 54
  - Grade 2: 49
  - Grade 3: 56
  - Grade 4: 54
  - Grade 5: 45
  - Grade 6: 50
  - Grade 7: 42
  - Grade 8: 53
  - Grade 9: 42
  - Grade 10: 34
  - Grade 11: 42
  - Grade 12: 28
- Student to teacher ratio: 21.75
- Colors: Silver and Blue
- Mascot: Seagull
- Website: annefrankia.com

Anne Frank Inspire Academy (AFIA) is a public K-12 charter school in San Antonio, operated by Braination (formerly John H. Wood Jr. Public Charter District).

The original campus, Bandera Road, has grades K-12. It is in proximity to Helotes and was named after Anne Frank. The school also has a K-8 campus, NW Military.

== History ==
AFIA opened in 2014 with 150 middle school students. 220 applications for admission were submitted to the school by April 2013. It was the first non-residential charter school operated by the district. The school had a cost of $5.5 million; funds used to establish the school originated in savings amassed from government funds for the disciplinary schools, and the establishment used almost all of the district's savings. Braination closed one of its existing schools, located in a detention center in Post, Texas, and gave its state campus identification number to Frank because its charter limited it to operating six schools. In 2014 the school had seven teachers, what are called "facilitators", with all but one having prior significant teaching experience.

Its Bandera Road elementary school facility and 9th grade were scheduled to open in fall 2015.

Due to Bandera Road becoming at capacity, the second campus, NW military, opened in 2021 with grades K-4, with each new grade opening each subsequent year until it has K-8. The previous entity in that building was another charter school that moved elsewhere.

== Student body ==
Admission is by lottery; As of 2014 the majority of the students resided in the Northside Independent School District (NISD), as the school is within the district's territory. As of 2019 the school had 400 students.

== Campuses ==
The Bandera Road facility, designed by Fielding Nair, Intl. Architects and built by RVK Architects, has 17,310 square feet (1,608 m^{2}) of space. The school was designed to have extracurricular activities and includes a plaza, a nature trail, a pond, and a treehouse. Pete Nelson, a treehouse builder from Portland, Oregon, built the treehouse.

== Curriculum and operations ==
Teachers are known as "facilitators" at this school. Learning is self-directed, with students meeting advisors and attending teacher-directed seminars each morning before starting work. Students may engage in tutoring, work in small groups, or work by themselves. Therefore, the school lacks a bell schedule, as well as desks and hallways seen in traditional middle schools. Students described the movement throughout the school as "controlled chaos". As of mid-2025, the school has taken to referring to the former High School and Middle School buildings as the "Steam building" and "Humanities building" respectively. Following this change, students in grades 6th-12th grade now traverse between these two buildings several times per school day, with the STEAM building dedicated to Science, Technology, Engineering, and Mathematical subjects, while the Humanities building is dedicated to subjects such as history and English. School hours span from 8:00 AM to 4:00 PM, with lunch beginning at around 12:00 depending on grade level (high school & middle school), requiring students to sign in at the front desk of either the elementary building or Humanities building for grades 6th-12th if arriving later than 7:45. Typically, students do not have mandatory fridays, as the school implements a "focus friday", in which students are only required to attend school if they are not caught up academically. Occasionally, a Friday will be mandatory, typically if a holiday that would have dismissed school falls earlier that same week.

== Athletics ==
The school planned to have art, computer, and robotics elective courses. In 2014 the school had no plans to have athletics. The school does have informal athletic programs operated as clubs.

== See also ==
- Education in San Antonio
