= Southland, Texas =

- Unincorporated community
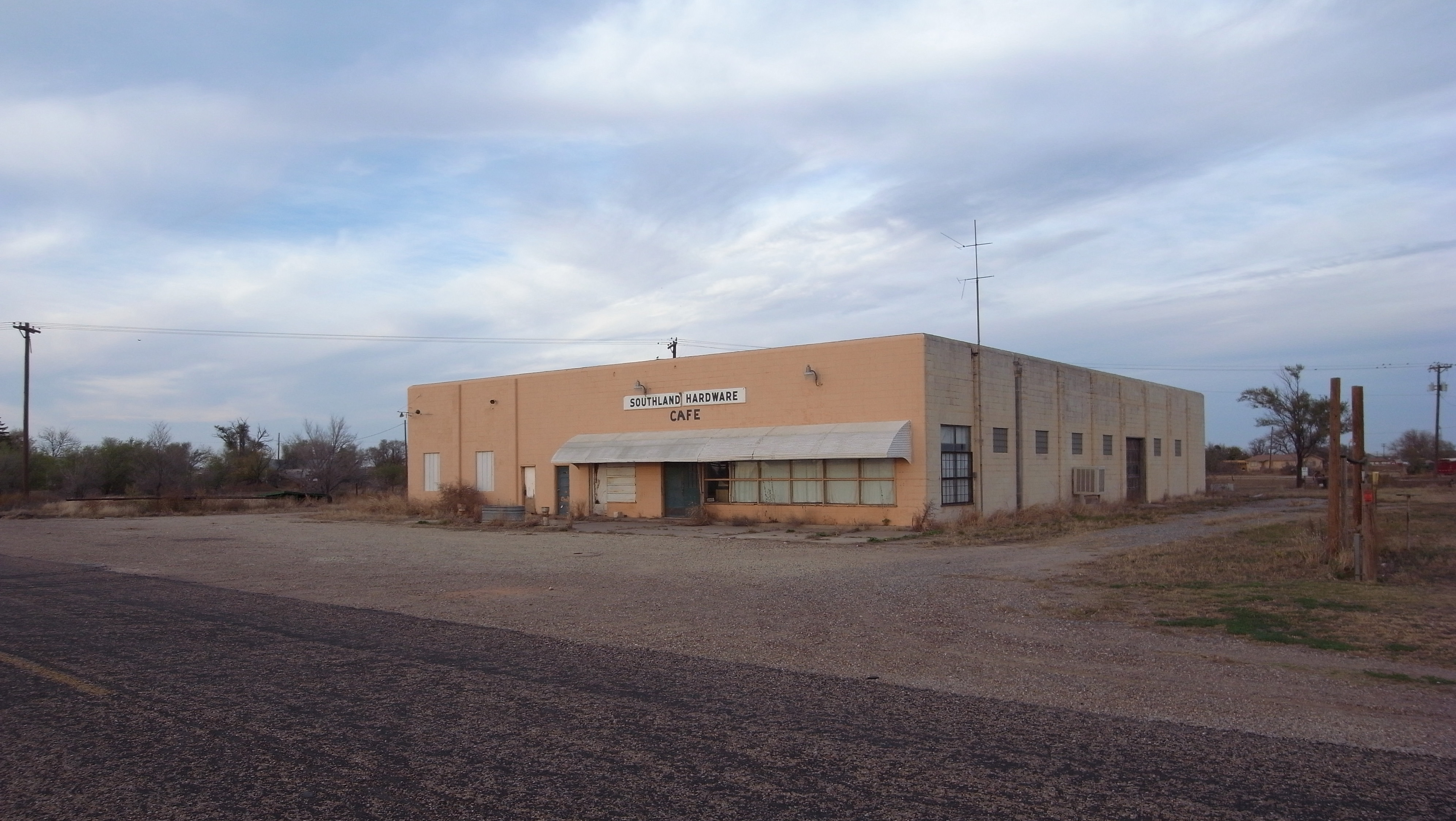
- Southland Hardware

- Location within Texas Location within the United States
- Coordinates: 33°21′43″N 101°33′01″W
- Country: United States
- State: Texas
- County: Garza
- Region: Llano Estacado
- Established: 1907
- Elevation: 3,022 ft (921 m)

Population (2000)
  - Total: 160
- Time zone: UTC-6 (CST)
- ZIP code: 79364
- Area code: 806
- Website: Handbook of Texas

Southland is an unincorporated community in Garza County, Texas, United States. It lies along the eastern edge of the Llano Estacado on U.S. Route 84, twenty miles northwest of Post.

== History ==
Named for its location on the southern end of the V Ranch, Southland became a trade center between several area ranches with the organization of Garza County in 1907. When the Pecos and Northern Texas Railway was extended north from Sweetwater through to Lubbock in 1910, railroad authorities chose to build through Southland rather than establish a new railroad town (which had tended to be a common occurrence). As a result, the community entered a period of limited prosperity and by 1911 had been granted a post office. Southland also saw benefit from C.W. Post's colonization of the area, providing a shipping point for his utopian project community and namesake town 20 miles to the southeast, Post.

As with many small towns, however, the Great Depression had a dire effect on Southland and by 1940, the town's only bank had closed, and its population stood at 280 residents. By 1960, however, this had dropped to under 200 and half of its eleven businesses had closed their doors, as the demand for agricultural work had slowed and shifted elsewhere, forcing many Southlanders to follow. Today, Southland remains a rural farming community with an estimated 2000 population of just under 160 residents.

== Education ==
Southland is served by the Southland Independent School District.

== Gallery ==
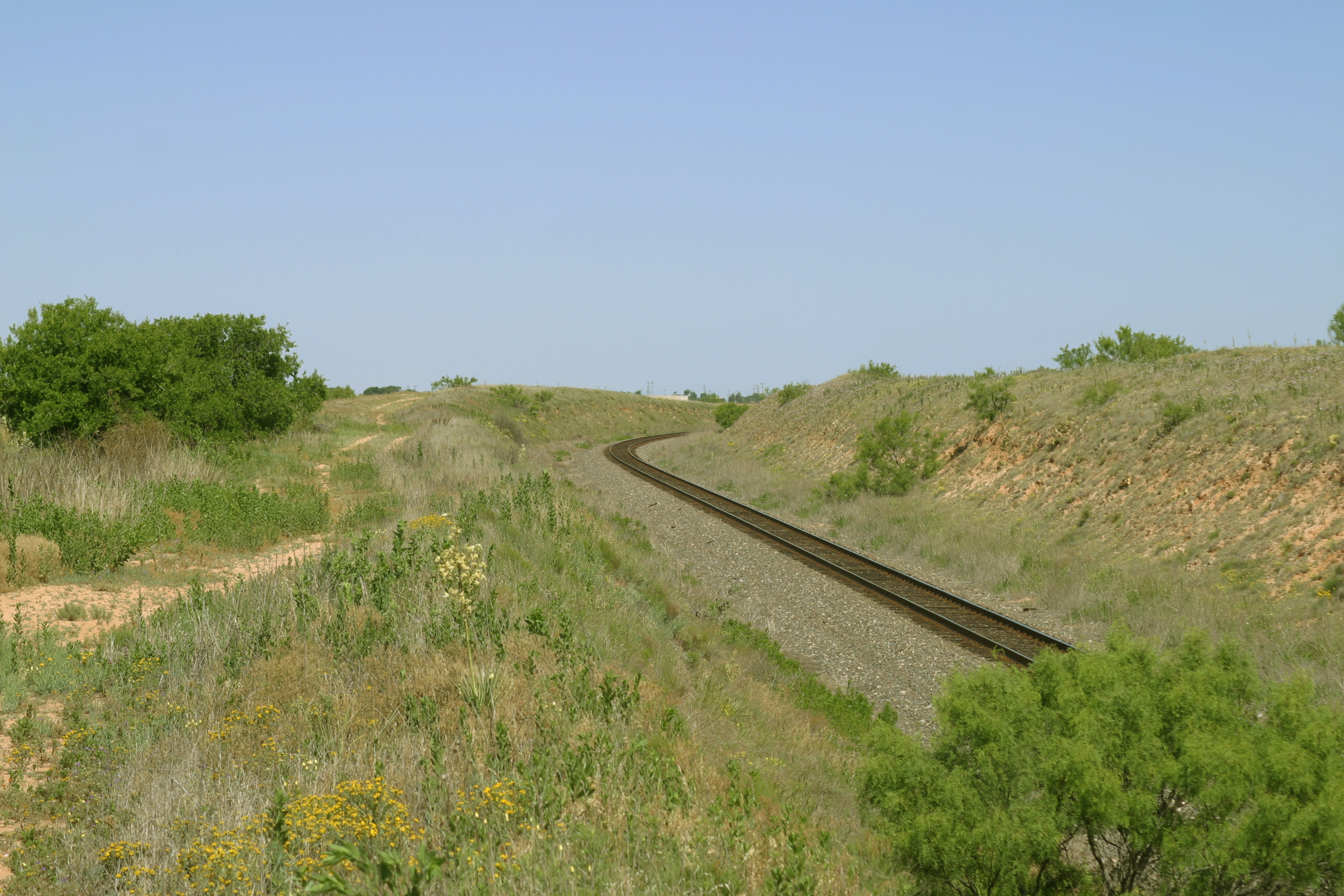
After a long climb, the BNSF railroad crosses the top of the Caprock Escarpment and extends onto the level plains of the Llano Estacado at Southland.

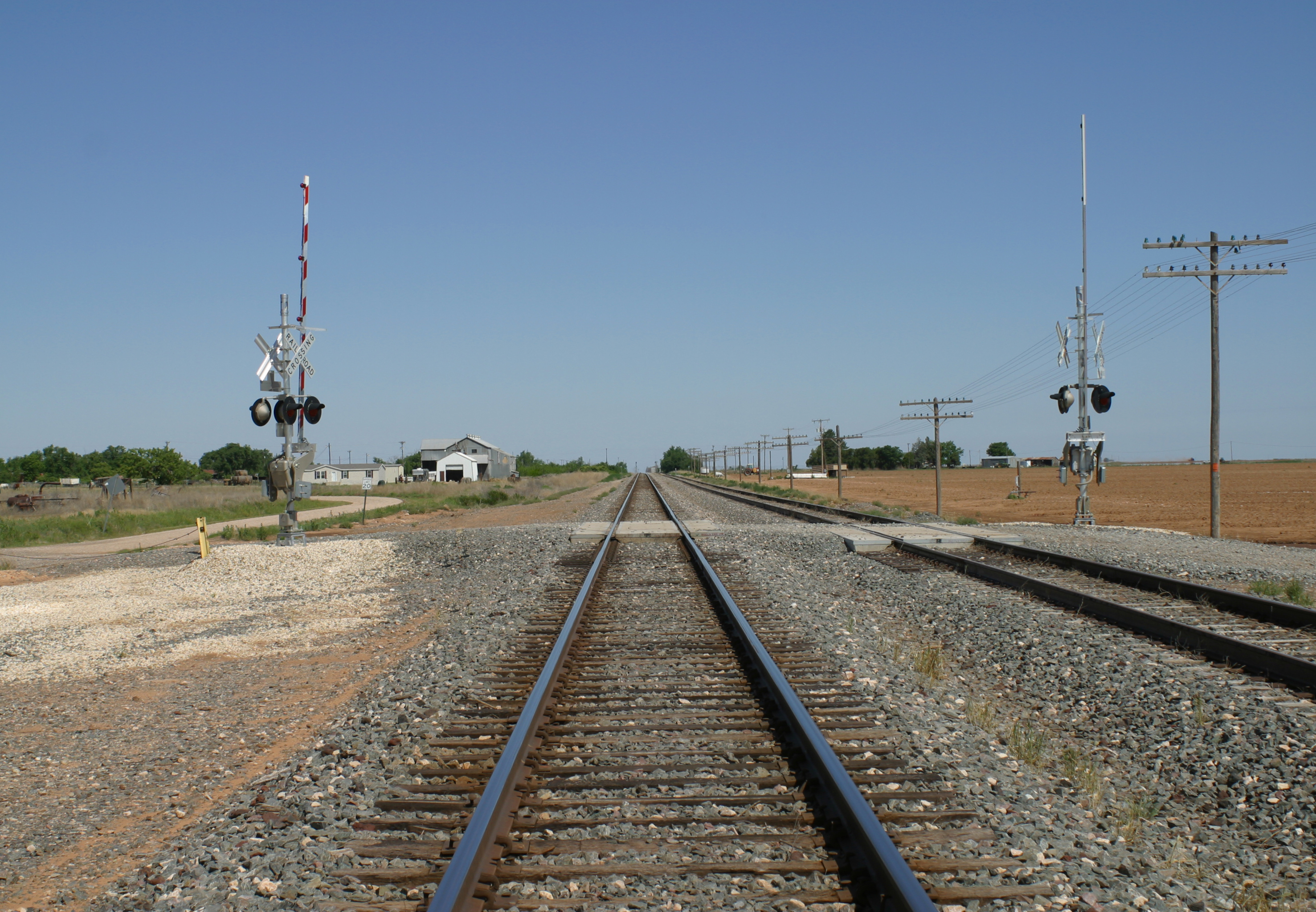
BNSF railroad tracks running across the level plains of the Llano Estacado on the east side of Southland.

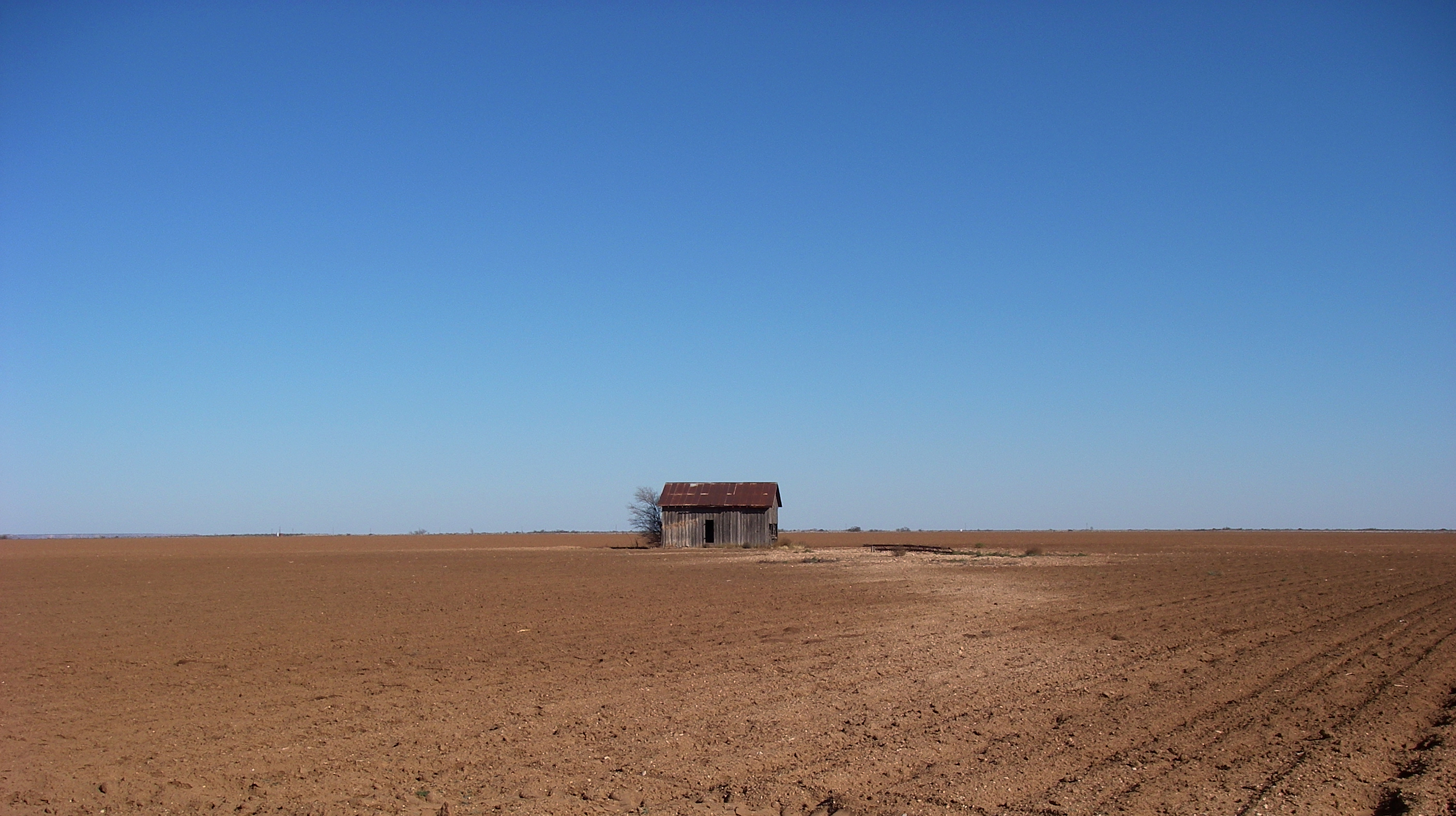
Abandoned farm building on the northeast side of Southland.

== See also ==
- Close City, Texas
- Yellow House Canyon
- Llano Estacado
- Caprock Escarpment
- Duffy's Peak
- BNSF Railway
