= St. Francis Academy (San Antonio) =

American high school in Texas (1960–2002)

Coordinates: 29.3773°N 98.5376°W

St. Francis Academy was an all-girls' Catholic senior high school in southern San Antonio, Texas.

The Sisters of Saint Francis opened the school in 1960. The school closed in 2002, due to financial issues. It was the fifth Catholic school to be scheduled to close from 1992 to January 2002. After Saint Francis shut down, there were two all-girls' Catholic high schools remaining in San Antonio, though neither was in southern or western San Antonio.

The John H. Wood Jr. Charter School System reopened the campus as a charter school in 2003.

In the 2009–2010 school year Holy Cross of San Antonio, a previously all-boys' secondary Catholic school serving the same areas that St. Francis did, opened its enrollment to girls.
