= Southland Independent School District =

School district in Texas

Coordinates: 33°21′41.2″N 101°33′12.5″W

Southland Independent School District is a public school district based in the community of Southland, Texas (USA).

Located in Garza County, portions of the district extend into Lynn and Lubbock counties.

== Academic achievement ==
In 2009, the school district was rated "academically acceptable" by the Texas Education Agency.

== Special programs ==
=== Athletics ===
Southland High School plays six-man football.

== See also ==
- List of school districts in Texas
