= Post Independent School District =

School district in Texas

Post Independent School District is a public school district based in Post, Texas (USA).

Located in Garza County, small portions of the district extend into Lynn and Kent counties.

In 2009, the school district was rated "academically acceptable" by the Texas Education Agency. In 2013 it had 818 students.

Circa 2013 the district was to begin educating students at the Garza County Juvenile Detention Center in Post. Previously the John H. Wood Jr. Public Charter District (now Braination) operated a school at the detention facility, but in 2013 announced plans to close it as the State of Texas at the time limited the number of schools that the district may operate to six, and Braination had plans to open the Anne Frank non-residential charter school in San Antonio.

== Schools ==
- Post High School (Grades 9-12)
- Post Middle School (Grades 6-8)
- Post Elementary School (Grades PK-5)
