= Post High School (Texas) =

Location
- 307 West 4th Street; Post, Texas 79356-3808; United States; 33.186466°N 101.380164°W

Information
- Type: Public high school
- School district: Post Independent School District
- NCES School ID: 483549004026
- Principal: Sol DeLeon
- Teaching staff: 21.17 (on an FTE basis)
- Grades: 9–12
- Enrollment: 247 (2023-2024)
- Student to teacher ratio: 11.67
- Colors: Black and gold
- Athletics conference: University Interscholastic League
- Mascot: Antelope
- Website: phs.postisd.net

Post High School is a public high school in Post, Texas, United States. It is part of the Post Independent School District and classified as a 2A school by the University Interscholastic League. In 2015, the school was rated "Met Standard" by the Texas Education Agency.

== Athletics ==
The Post Antelopes compete in these sports -

- Baseball
- Basketball
- Cross Country
- Football
- Golf
- Powerlifting
- Softball
- Tennis
- Track and Field
- Volleyball

=== State Titles ===
- Girls Golf -
  - 1996 (2A)
