= Close City, Texas =

- Unincorporated community
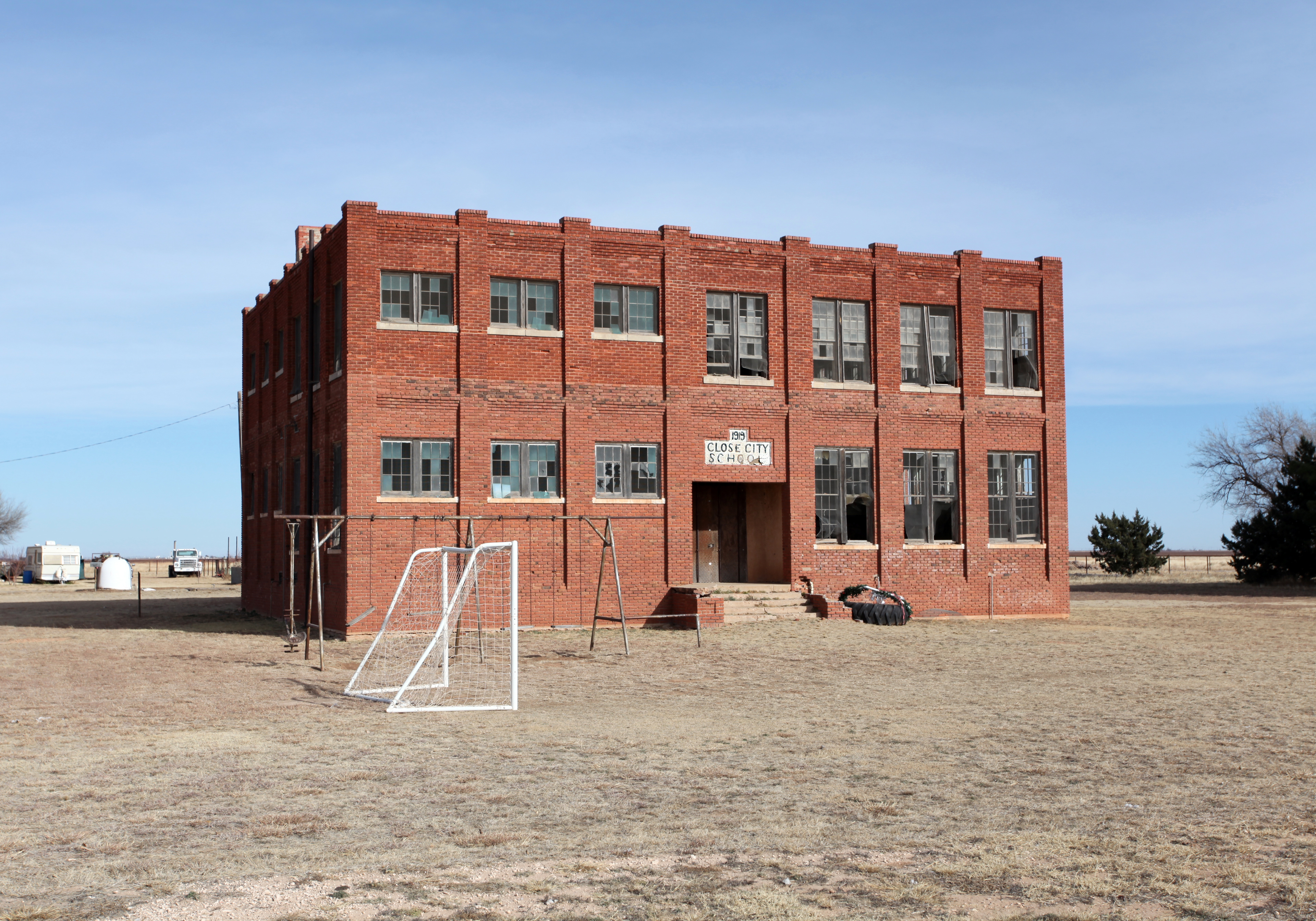
- Close City school built 1919, abandoned 1965

- Location within Texas Location within the United States
- Coordinates: 33°12′39″N 101°29′14″W
- Country: United States
- State: Texas
- County: Garza
- Region: Llano Estacado
- Established: 1906
- Founder: C. W. Post
- Elevation: 2,933 ft (894 m)
- Time zone: UTC-6 (CST)
- ZIP code: 79343
- Area code: 806
- Website: Handbook of Texas

Close City is an unincorporated community in western Garza County, about 6.5 mi (10.5 km) west-northwest of Post. The small rural community lies on the High Plains of the Llano Estacado in West Texas.

The town site was chosen as the original location of Post City, a model community and social experiment conceived by C. W. Post, an American breakfast cereal and foods manufacturer. In the early 1890s, Post developed a popular caffeine-free coffee substitute called Postum, and later made a fortune on breakfast cereals such as Grape Nuts and Post Toasties. As Post's wealth grew, his interests began to expand into other areas. One project that had always intrigued him was the creation of a planned community of model homes and industry. His success in the prepared-foods industry provided the financial resources to begin this project.

C. W. Post initially chose a site on the Llano Estacado for his projected settlement. Construction of Post City began at the original site until surveyors discovered that the town was 11 mi (18 km) from the geographical center of Garza County. State law required a county seat to be located no more than 5 mi (8.0 km) from the center of a county, thus the chosen site could not serve as county seat. Post ordered work to stop and he shifted resources to a site located nearer the center of the county. The new site, located below the Caprock, is the present-day location of Post.

The original town site, called Ragtown, was renamed Close City, named after Edward Bennett "E.B." Close, who married Post's daughter, Marjorie Merriweather Post, in 1905. Although some residents stayed, the town developed slowly and consequently remained a small rural community. Today, Close City is primarily a farming community. The primary crop is cotton, but lesser amounts of grain sorghum and winter wheat are also grown in the area. Crops are grown on a mixture of irrigated and dryland farms. Water for irrigation is pumped from the underlying Ogallala Aquifer, and is usually applied using center-pivot irrigation systems.

In 1909, Close City students attended school in a one-room wooden schoolhouse. In 1919, George Samson and Jimmie Napier built a new brick schoolhouse, which served the community well until 1965, when Close City School was consolidated with Post schools.

The only paved road that passes through Close City is Farm to Market Road 399. Close City is 2 mi (3.2 km) north of U.S. Highway 380 and 3 mi (4.8 km) west of U.S. Highway 84. The BNSF Railway, which extends from Post to Lubbock, passes 5 mi (8.0 km) to the east.

== See also ==
- Post Cereals
- Estacado, Texas
- Canyon Valley, Texas
- South Plains
- West Texas
- Glenn Close (descendant of Edward Bennett Close, first husband of Marjorie Merriweather Post)
