= Garza County, Texas =

County in Texas, United States

- County
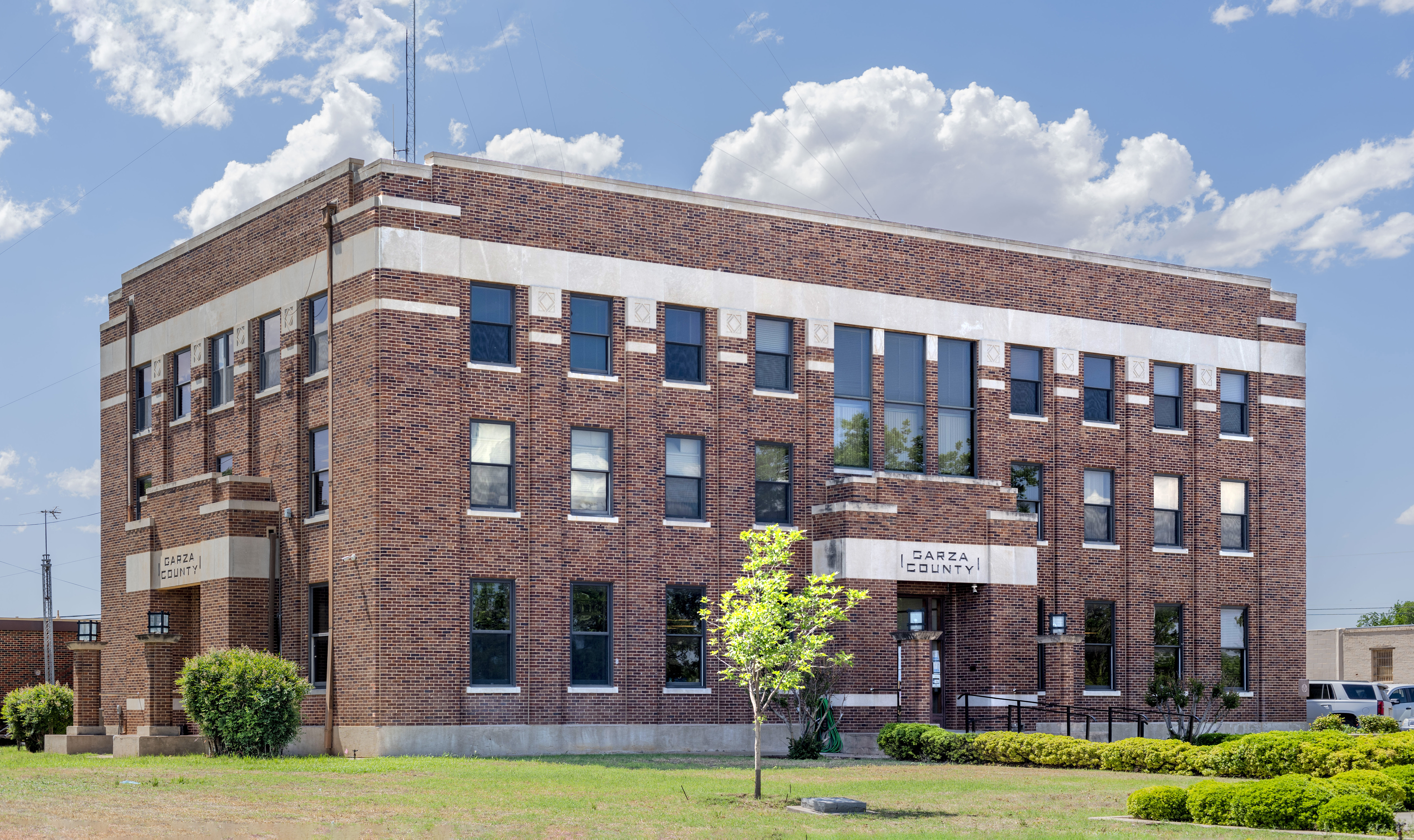
- Garza County Courthouse in Post

- Location within the U.S. state of Texas
- Coordinates: 33°11′N 101°18′W
- Country: United States
- State: Texas
- Founded: 1907
- Seat: Post
- Largest city: Post

Area
  - Total: 896 sq mi (2,320 km^{2})
  - Land: 893 sq mi (2,310 km^{2})
  - Water: 2.8 sq mi (7.3 km^{2}) 0.3%

Population (2020)
  - Total: 5,816
  - Estimate (2025): 4,510 ▼
  - Density: 6.51/sq mi (2.51/km^{2})
- Time zone: UTC−6 (Central)
  - Summer (DST): UTC−5 (CDT)
- Congressional district: 19th
- Website: www.garzacounty.gov

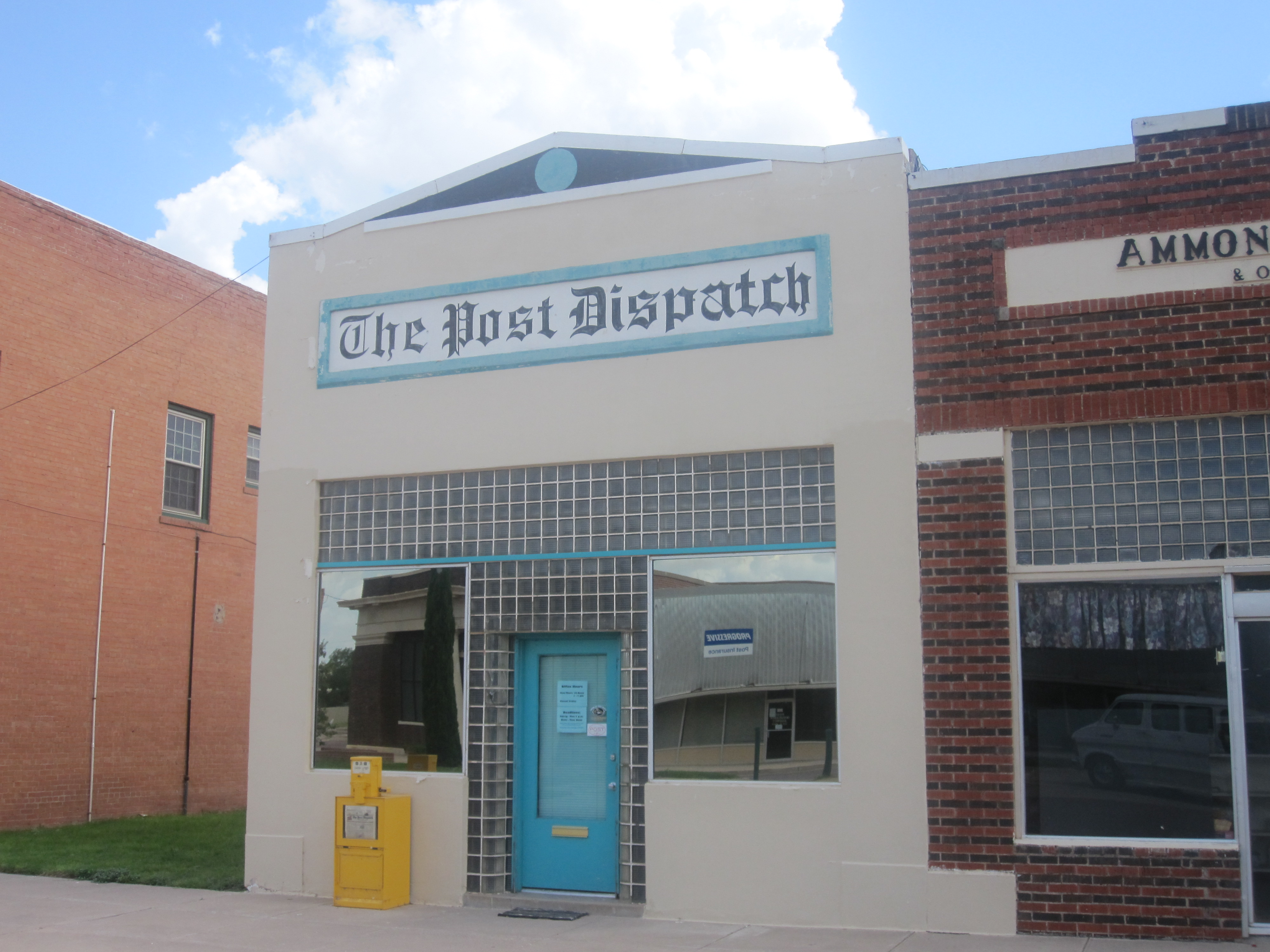
Post Dispatch newspaper covers local events of Garza County.

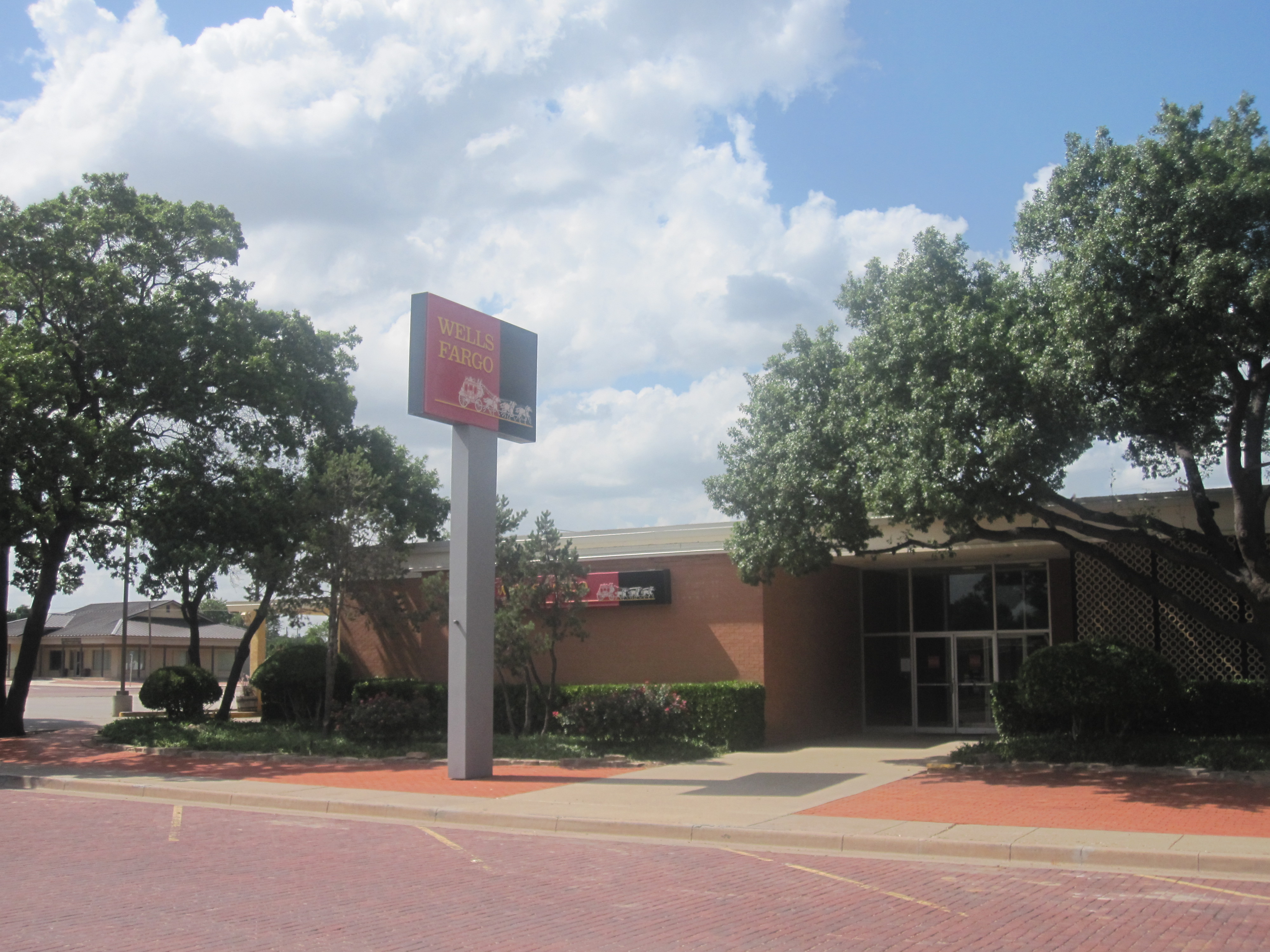
Wells Fargo Bank serves Garza County through its outlet in Post.

Garza County is a county located in the U.S. state of Texas. As of the 2020 census, its population was 5,816, of which most of the population were residing in its county seat, and only incorporated municipality, Post. The county was created in 1876 and later organized in 1907. Garza is named for a pioneer Bexar County family, as it was once a part of that county.

== History ==
Indigenous peoples of the Americas were the first inhabitants of the area, with evidence from around 2000 BC. Later inhabitants were the Kiowa and Comanche.

In 1875, W. C. Young of Fort Worth and Irishman Ben Galbraith of Illinois established the beginnings of the Curry Comb Ranch in the northwestern part of Garza County.

Garza County was formed in 1876 from Bexar County, and named for Lieutenant Joseph de la Garza and his family who were prominent in Bexar County and decedened from José Antonio de la Garza.

By 1880, the county census count was 36 people. The Square and Compass Ranch was started 2 years later by the Nave and McCord Cattle Company. They put up the first barbed-wire fence in 1884. That same year, OS Ranch was founded by brothers Andrew J. and Frank M. Long of Lexington, Kentucky. The county's population reached 185 persons by the last year of the 19th century. Post was founded in 1907 as a utopian venture by, and named for, cereal king C.W. Post. From 1909 to 1913, C.W. Post built a cotton gin and a cotton mill, and attempted to improve agriculture production through rainmaking, involving the heavy use of explosives fired from kites and towers along the rim of the Caprock Escarpment.

In 1926, oil was discovered in the county. Quanah and Bryan Maxey discovered a 16-foot-long tusk of a prehistoric imperial mammoth in 1934. This tusk is currently located in the American Museum of Natural History, New York City.

In 1957, a prehistoric Indian site was recorded at Cowhead Mesa by Emmet Shedd of Post. In 1960–1965, South Plains Archaeological Society excavations of Cowhead Mesa found artifacts to date inhabitation back to 2000 BC.

The most important businesses in the county by 1980 were agribusiness, oil and gas extraction, and textile mills.

== Geography ==
According to the U.S. Census Bureau, the county has a total area of 896 sq mi (2,320 km^{2}), of which 893 sq mi (2,310 km^{2}) are land and 2.8 sq mi (7.3 km^{2}) (0.3%) are covered by water. It is located southeast of Lubbock in the Canyonlands of the Llano Estacado Escarpment.

=== Major roads and highways ===
- U.S. Highway 84
- U.S. Highway 380
- State Highway 207
- Spur 45
- Loop 46
- Spur 575
- Farm to Market Road 669

=== Adjacent counties ===
- Crosby County (north)
- Dickens County (northeast)
- Kent County (east)
- Scurry County (southeast)
- Borden County (south)
- Lynn County (west)
- Lubbock County (northwest)

== Demographics ==
Historical population
Census	Pop.	Note	%±
1880	36		—
1890	14		−61.1%
1900	185		1,221.4%
1910	1,995		978.4%
1920	4,253		113.2%
1930	5,586		31.3%
1940	5,678		1.6%
1950	6,281		10.6%
1960	6,611		5.3%
1970	5,289		−20.0%
1980	5,336		0.9%
1990	5,143		−3.6%
2000	4,872		−5.3%
2010	6,461		32.6%
2020	5,816		−10.0%
2025 (est.)	4,510	▼	−22.5%
U.S. Decennial Census; 1850–2010 2010 2020

=== Racial and ethnic composition ===
Garza County, Texas – Racial and ethnic composition Note: the US Census treats Hispanic/Latino as an ethnic category. This table excludes Latinos from the racial categories and assigns them to a separate category. Hispanics/Latinos may be of any race.
Race / Ethnicity (NH = Non-Hispanic)	Pop 2000	Pop 2010	Pop 2020	% 2000	% 2010	% 2020
White alone (NH)	2,760	2,962	2,162	56.65%	45.84%	37.17%
Black or African American alone (NH)	221	392	230	4.54%	6.07%	3.95%
Native American or Alaska Native alone (NH)	7	25	28	0.14%	0.39%	0.48%
Asian alone (NH)	4	8	25	0.08%	0.12%	0.43%
Pacific Islander alone (NH)	0	3	0	0.00%	0.05%	0.00%
Other race alone (NH)	0	1	10	0.00%	0.02%	0.17%
Mixed race or Multiracial (NH)	70	24	89	1.44%	0.37%	1.53%
Hispanic or Latino (any race)	1,810	3,046	3,272	37.15%	47.14%	56.26%
Total	4,872	6,461	5,816	100.00%	100.00%	100.00%

=== 2020 census ===
As of the 2020 census, the county had a population of 5,816. The median age was 40.4 years. 17.7% of residents were under the age of 18 and 14.6% of residents were 65 years of age or older. For every 100 females there were 182.9 males, and for every 100 females age 18 and over there were 204.3 males age 18 and over.

The racial makeup of the county was 74.4% White, 5.1% Black or African American, 0.6% American Indian and Alaska Native, 0.5% Asian, <0.1% Native Hawaiian and Pacific Islander, 11.7% from some other race, and 7.8% from two or more races. Hispanic or Latino residents of any race comprised 56.3% of the population.

<0.1% of residents lived in urban areas, while 100.0% lived in rural areas.

There were 1,636 households in the county, of which 30.9% had children under the age of 18 living in them. Of all households, 50.5% were married-couple households, 19.6% were households with a male householder and no spouse or partner present, and 24.9% were households with a female householder and no spouse or partner present. About 27.5% of all households were made up of individuals and 13.9% had someone living alone who was 65 years of age or older.

There were 2,126 housing units, of which 23.0% were vacant. Among occupied housing units, 72.2% were owner-occupied and 27.8% were renter-occupied. The homeowner vacancy rate was 2.4% and the rental vacancy rate was 12.1%.

=== 2000 census ===
As of the 2000 census, 4,872 people, 1,663 households, and 1,217 families resided in the county. The population density was 5 people/mi^{2} (1.9 people/km^{2}). The 1,928 housing units averaged 2 per square mile (0.77/km^{2}). The racial makeup of the county was 56.7% White, 4.8 African American, 0.2% Native American, 0.1% Asian, 17.1% from other races, and 3.00% from two or more races. Hispanics or Latinos of any race were 37.2% of the population.

Of the 1,663 households, 36.0% had children under the age of 18 living with them, 58.5% were married couples living together, 11.2% had a female householder with no husband present, and 26.8% were not families. About 23.8% of all households were made up of individuals, and 12.0% had someone living alone who was 65 or older. The average household size was 2.65 and the average family size was 3.15.

In the county, the population was distributed as 28.00% under the age of 18, 7.90% from 18 to 24, 28.60% from 25 to 44, 21.30% from 45 to 64, and 14.10% who were 65 years of age or older. The median age was 35 years. For every 100 females, there were 112.30 males. For every 100 females age 18 and over, there were 111.30 males.

The median income for a household in the county was $27,206, and for a family was $31,173. Males had a median income of $26,604 versus $18,105 for females. The per capita income for the county was $12,704. About 17.50% of families and 22.30% of the population were below the poverty line, including 29.6% of those under age 18 and 18.6% of those age 65 or over.

== Communities ==
=== City ===
- Post (county seat)

=== Unincorporated communities ===
- Close City
- Justiceburg
- Southland

== Politics ==
Republican Drew Springer, Jr., a businessman from Muenster in Cooke County, has since January 2013 represented Garza County in the Texas House of Representatives.

Garza County is located within District 83 of the Texas House of Representatives. Garza County is located within District 28 of the Texas Senate.

United States presidential election results for Garza County, Texas
Year	Republican		Democratic		Third party(ies)	
Year	No.	%	No.	%	No.	%
1912	7	4.27%	144	87.80%	13	7.93%
1916	14	3.91%	330	92.18%	14	3.91%
1920	28	5.92%	392	82.88%	53	11.21%
1924	331	35.06%	588	62.29%	25	2.65%
1928	794	73.59%	285	26.41%	0	0.00%
1932	87	9.62%	812	89.82%	5	0.55%
1936	132	14.01%	807	85.67%	3	0.32%
1940	198	15.49%	1,073	83.96%	7	0.55%
1944	144	12.42%	842	72.65%	173	14.93%
1948	176	15.86%	861	77.57%	73	6.58%
1952	742	48.15%	797	51.72%	2	0.13%
1956	628	44.38%	786	55.55%	1	0.07%
1960	737	46.76%	829	52.60%	10	0.63%
1964	567	31.03%	1,254	68.64%	6	0.33%
1968	615	37.05%	662	39.88%	383	23.07%
1972	1,153	72.11%	446	27.89%	0	0.00%
1976	755	43.77%	957	55.48%	13	0.75%
1980	1,188	62.63%	677	35.69%	32	1.69%
1984	1,219	69.66%	521	29.77%	10	0.57%
1988	1,183	54.02%	989	45.16%	18	0.82%
1992	982	52.01%	558	29.56%	348	18.43%
1996	946	53.93%	703	40.08%	105	5.99%
2000	1,302	73.56%	454	25.65%	14	0.79%
2004	1,480	81.68%	326	17.99%	6	0.33%
2008	1,356	77.49%	375	21.43%	19	1.09%
2012	1,263	80.96%	279	17.88%	18	1.15%
2016	1,225	82.55%	230	15.50%	29	1.95%
2020	1,413	85.48%	231	13.97%	9	0.54%
2024	1,374	85.93%	213	13.32%	12	0.75%

United States Senate election results for Garza County, Texas1
Year	Republican		Democratic		Third party(ies)	
Year	No.	%	No.	%	No.	%
2024	1,318	84.00%	223	14.21%	28	1.78%

United States Senate election results for Garza County, Texas2
Year	Republican		Democratic		Third party(ies)	
Year	No.	%	No.	%	No.	%
2020	1,374	84.97%	225	13.91%	18	1.11%

Texas Gubernatorial election results for Garza County
Year	Republican		Democratic		Third party(ies)	
Year	No.	%	No.	%	No.	%
2022	1,056	88.00%	135	11.25%	9	0.75%

== Education ==
School districts serving the county include:

- Crosbyton Consolidated Independent School District
- Post Independent School District
- Southland Independent School District

The county is in the service area of South Plains College.

== See also ==
- C.W. Post Memorial Camp
- Double Mountain Fork Brazos River
- Duffy's Peak
- Farm to Market Road 669
- Garza County Historical Museum
- National Register of Historic Places listings in Garza County, Texas
- Recorded Texas Historic Landmarks in Garza County
- Mushaway Peak
- Salt Fork Brazos River
