= Post, Texas =

- City
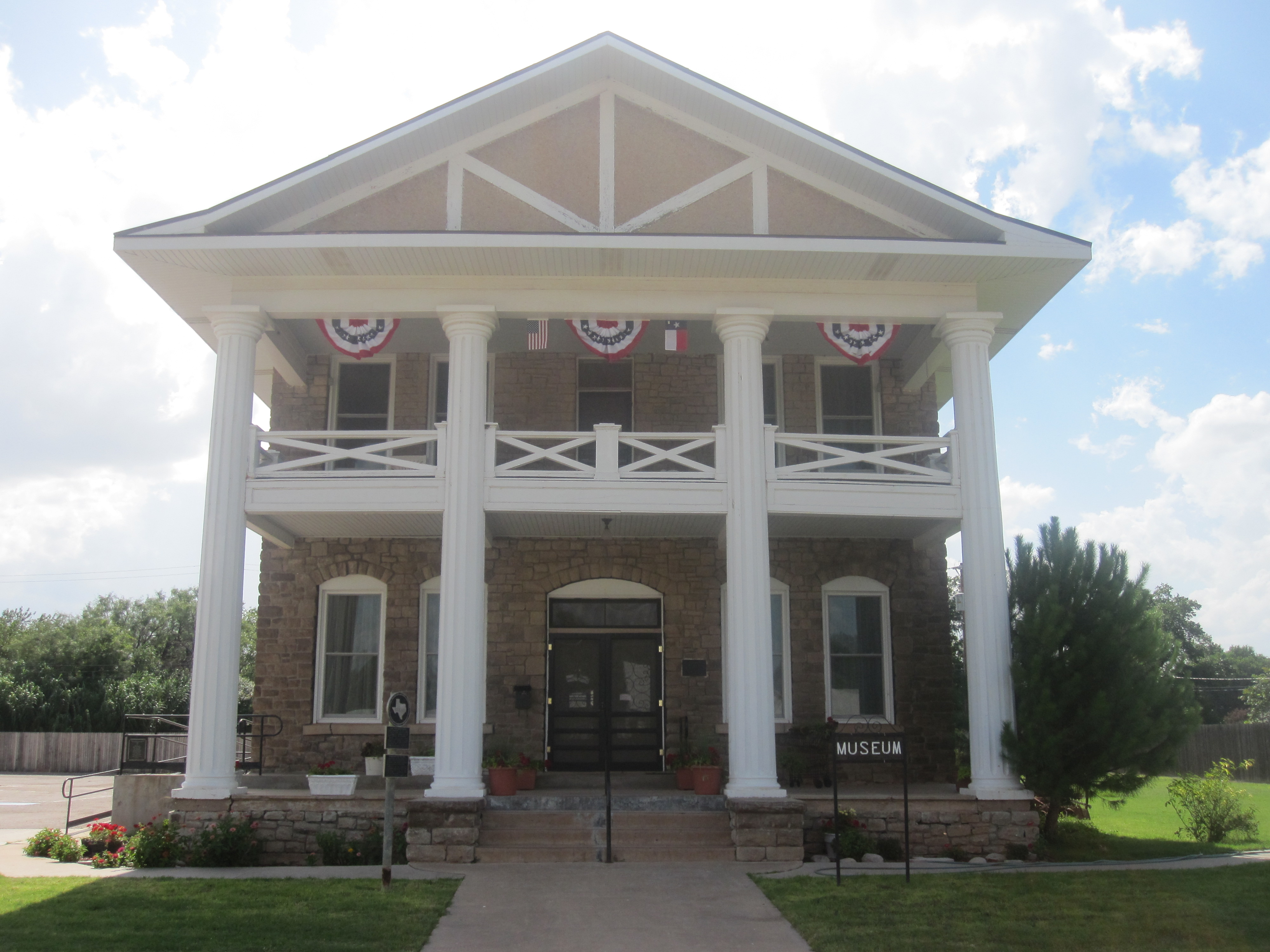
- Garza County Historical Museum in Post is a restored sanitarium

- Location of Post in Garza County, Texas
- Coordinates: 33°11′30″N 101°22′50″W
- Country: United States
- State: Texas
- County: Garza
- Founded: 1907
- Incorporated: 1914

Government
  - Type: Council-Manager
  - Mayor: Marvin Self
  - Mayor Pro Tem: Pixie Grisham
  - Councilmember: Evonne Sapp; Pixie Grisham; Jeff Hood; Diane James; Jimmy Valdez

Area
  - Total: 3.774 sq mi (9.775 km^{2})
  - Land: 3.745 sq mi (9.699 km^{2})
  - Water: 0.029 sq mi (0.075 km^{2})
- Elevation: 2,605 ft (794 m)

Population (2020)
  - Total: 4,790
  - Estimate (2023): 3,486
  - Density: 930/sq mi (359/km^{2})
- Time zone: UTC–6 (Central (CST))
  - Summer (DST): UTC–5 (CDT)
- ZIP Code: 79356
- Area code: 806
- FIPS code: 48-59012
- GNIS feature ID: 1365627
- Sales tax: 8.25%
- Website: cityofposttexas.com

Post is a city in and the county seat of Garza County, Texas, United States. Its population was 4,790 at the 2020 census. According to 2023 census estimates, the city is estimated to have a population of 3,486. The Triassic reptile Postosuchus is named after the city.

== History ==
Post is located on the edge of the caprock escarpment of the Llano Estacado, the southeastern edge of the Great Plains. It is at the crossroads of U.S. Routes 84 and 380.

The land had been on John Bunyan Slaughter's U Lazy S Ranch. In 1906 Slaughter sold it to C. W. Post, the breakfast cereal manufacturer, who founded "Post City" as a utopian colonizing venture in 1907. Post devised the community as a model town. He purchased 200,000 acres (810 km^{2}) of ranchland and established the Double U Company to manage the town's construction. The company built trim houses and numerous structures including the Algerita Hotel, a gin, and a textile plant. They planted trees along every street and prohibited alcoholic beverages and brothels. The Double U Company rented and sold farms and houses to settlers. A post office began in a tent during the year of Post City's founding, being established (with the name Post) July 18, 1907, with Frank L. Curtis as the first postmaster. Two years later, the town had a school, a bank, and a newspaper, the Post City Post, the same name as the daily in St. Louis, Missouri. The Garza County paper today is called the Post Dispatch—by coincidence, also the same as the current daily in St. Louis. The Santa Fe Railway reached the town in 1910. The town changed its name to "Post" when it was incorporated in 1914, the year of C. W. Post's death. By then, Post had a population of 1000, 10 retail businesses, a dentist, a physician, a sanitarium, and Baptist, Methodist, and Presbyterian churches.

From 1910 to 1913, Post experimented with attempts at rainmaking. Explosives were detonated in the atmosphere at timed intervals. Precipitation records, however, showed that the efforts failed.

The C. W. Post estate pledged $75,000, and the town raised $35,000 in 1916 to bid unsuccessfully to become the site of the proposed West Texas Agricultural and Mechanical College.

Postex Cotton Mills began production in 1913 with 250 employees. When the Post interests sold the business in 1945 to Ely and Walker Dry Goods Company of St. Louis, the plant was producing six million yards of cloth a year and employed 375 workers, who manufactured Postex cotton sheets and Garza pillow cases. Ely and Walker sold Postex in 1955 to Burlington Industries, the world's largest textile manufacturer at that time. By 1973, the company employed 450 persons. The mill has since closed.

Oilfield service companies have been important to the economy, as have farming and ranching. In 1989, Post had two libraries, a hospital, a nursing home, an airport, the Post Dispatch (founded 1926), and 90 businesses. The population reached 3,400 in 1928, declined to 2,000 in 1940, but increased to 3,100 during the 1950s. With the development of the local oil industry, the town's population attained its highest level of 4,800 in 1964. The 1980 census showed a population of 3,864, but by 1988 the Texas Almanac reported 4,162. In 1990, the population was 3,768.

Many ranchers and civic boosters live in Garza County, among them Giles McCrary, a former mayor, who until his death in 2011 operated the OS Museum, a hybrid of exhibits from both the American West and Asia, which are changed three times per year. Two baseball fields in Post are named for former resident Norm Cash.

== Geography ==
Post is located on the rolling plains at the foot of the Llano Estacado at 33°11′30″N 101°22′50″W (33.191789, –101.380432).

According to the United States Census Bureau, the city has a total area of 9.775 square miles (25.32 km^{2}), of which, 9.699 square miles (25.12 km^{2}) is land and 0.029 square miles (0.08 km^{2}) is water.

=== Climate ===
According to the Köppen climate classification, Post has a semiarid climate. According to other climatic maps, it falls in a subtropical climate (Köppen: Cfa). Beyond the 100° meridian, it is the city most to the west in the USA with such categorization. The city feels influence from both sides, being in the subtropics at the transition from a humid to dry environment.

Climate data for Post, Texas (1991–2020 normals, extremes 1962–present)
Month	Jan	Feb	Mar	Apr	May	Jun	Jul	Aug	Sep	Oct	Nov	Dec	Year
Record high °F (°C)	84 (29)	93 (34)	99 (37)	105 (41)	110 (43)	115 (46)	112 (44)	111 (44)	107 (42)	103 (39)	92 (33)	84 (29)	115 (46)
Mean maximum °F (°C)	77.3 (25.2)	81.0 (27.2)	88.7 (31.5)	93.7 (34.3)	100.2 (37.9)	103.3 (39.6)	103.6 (39.8)	102.5 (39.2)	98.4 (36.9)	93.0 (33.9)	83.8 (28.8)	77.0 (25.0)	106.5 (41.4)
Mean daily maximum °F (°C)	55.9 (13.3)	60.5 (15.8)	68.6 (20.3)	77.4 (25.2)	85.1 (29.5)	92.5 (33.6)	95.2 (35.1)	94.2 (34.6)	86.4 (30.2)	77.5 (25.3)	65.5 (18.6)	56.5 (13.6)	76.3 (24.6)
Daily mean °F (°C)	42.3 (5.7)	46.0 (7.8)	53.8 (12.1)	62.1 (16.7)	71.1 (21.7)	79.2 (26.2)	82.5 (28.1)	81.4 (27.4)	73.8 (23.2)	63.8 (17.7)	51.9 (11.1)	43.5 (6.4)	62.6 (17.0)
Mean daily minimum °F (°C)	28.8 (−1.8)	31.5 (−0.3)	39.0 (3.9)	46.9 (8.3)	57.2 (14.0)	66.0 (18.9)	69.8 (21.0)	68.7 (20.4)	61.1 (16.2)	50.0 (10.0)	38.2 (3.4)	30.5 (−0.8)	49.0 (9.4)
Mean minimum °F (°C)	15.5 (−9.2)	18.5 (−7.5)	24.4 (−4.2)	33.4 (0.8)	44.0 (6.7)	56.7 (13.7)	63.8 (17.7)	61.9 (16.6)	50.2 (10.1)	35.5 (1.9)	24.2 (−4.3)	17.2 (−8.2)	11.7 (−11.3)
Record low °F (°C)	0 (−18)	−1 (−18)	5 (−15)	22 (−6)	34 (1)	45 (7)	56 (13)	51 (11)	37 (3)	19 (−7)	8 (−13)	−1 (−18)	−1 (−18)
Average precipitation inches (mm)	0.79 (20)	0.97 (25)	1.00 (25)	1.66 (42)	2.72 (69)	3.28 (83)	2.36 (60)	2.46 (62)	2.83 (72)	1.73 (44)	1.31 (33)	0.98 (25)	22.09 (561)
Average snowfall inches (cm)	0.9 (2.3)	1.5 (3.8)	0.0 (0.0)	0.0 (0.0)	0.0 (0.0)	0.0 (0.0)	0.0 (0.0)	0.0 (0.0)	0.0 (0.0)	0.0 (0.0)	0.5 (1.3)	1.2 (3.0)	4.1 (10)
Average precipitation days (≥ 0.01 in)	2.2	2.9	3.4	3.4	5.3	5.5	3.5	4.8	4.7	3.7	2.6	2.4	44.4
Average snowy days (≥ 0.1 in)	0.5	0.5	0.0	0.0	0.0	0.0	0.0	0.0	0.0	0.1	0.2	0.5	1.8
Source: NOAA

== Major roads and highways ==
- U.S. Highway 84
- U.S. Highway 380
- State Highway 207
- Farm to Market Road 669
- Farm to Market Road 651

== Demographics ==
Historical population
Census	Pop.	Note	%±
1920	1,436		—
1930	1,668		16.2%
1940	2,046		22.7%
1950	3,141		53.5%
1960	4,663		48.5%
1970	3,854		−17.3%
1980	3,961		2.8%
1990	3,768		−4.9%
2000	3,708		−1.6%
2010	5,376		45.0%
2020	4,790		−10.9%
2023 (est.)	3,486		−27.2%
U.S. Decennial Census; Texas Almanac: 1850-2000; 2020 Census

=== 2020 census ===
As of the 2020 census, Post had a population of 4,790, with 1,188 households and 787 families residing in the city. The median age was 39.1 years; 17.5% of residents were under the age of 18 and 12.4% of residents were 65 years of age or older. For every 100 females there were 206.1 males, and for every 100 females age 18 and over there were 235.7 males age 18 and over.

Of the 1,188 households, 32.4% had children under the age of 18 living in them. Of all households, 45.7% were married-couple households, 19.9% were households with a male householder and no spouse or partner present, and 28.7% were households with a female householder and no spouse or partner present. About 28.9% of all households were made up of individuals and 14.5% had someone living alone who was 65 years of age or older. There were 1,422 housing units in the city, of which 16.5% were vacant. The homeowner vacancy rate was 1.5% and the rental vacancy rate was 12.9%.

0.0% of residents lived in urban areas, while 100.0% lived in rural areas.

Racial composition as of the 2020 census
Race	Number	Percent
White	3,460	72.2%
Black or African American	294	6.1%
American Indian and Alaska Native	27	0.6%
Asian	26	0.5%
Native Hawaiian and Other Pacific Islander	0	0.0%
Some other race	589	12.3%
Two or more races	394	8.2%
Hispanic or Latino (of any race)	3,045	63.6%

=== 2000 census ===
As of the 2000 census, there were 3,708 people, 1,243 households, and 873 families residing in the city. The population density was 989 people/sq mi (382/km^{2}). The 1,419 housing units averaged 378/sq mi (146.1/km^{2}). The racial makeup of the city was 51.54% White, 5.47% African American, 0.24% Native American, 0.11% Asian, 18.69% from other races, and 2.91% from two or more races. About 42.64% of the population was Hispanic or Latino of any race.

Of the 1,243 households, 34.8% had children under the age of 18 living with them, 53.5% were married couples living together, 13.0% had a female householder with no husband present, and 29.7% were not families. About 26.6% of all households were made up of individuals, and 13.9% had someone living alone who was 65 or older. The average household size was 2.62 and the average family size was 3.17.

In the city, the age distribution was as 27.5% under 18, 8.8% from 18 to 24, 29.4% from 25 to 44, 20.0% from 45 to 64, and 14.4% who were 65 or older. The median age was 34 years. For every 100 females, there were 114.5 males. For every 100 females age 18 and over, there were 115.8 males.

The median income for a household in the city was $25,034, and for a family was $29,135. Males had a median income of $26,318 versus $17,266 for females. The per capita income for the city was $11,113. About 23.0% of families and 27.8% of the population were below the poverty line, including 34.2% of those under age 18 and 25.9% of those age 65 or over.

Post is served by two weekly newspapers, nearby (Lamesa) stations KJJT (FM) and KPET (AM), and the various Lubbock radio and TV stations. KPOS(AM) was licensed to Post, but was slated (license returned to FCC) for cancellation in 1998 when the sister FM was upgraded to cover Slaton and the Lubbock area. KSSL (FM) is licensed to Post, but operates primarily from offices and studios in Slaton.

== Education ==
The City of Post is served by the Post Independent School District and home to the Post High School Antelopes.

== Gallery ==
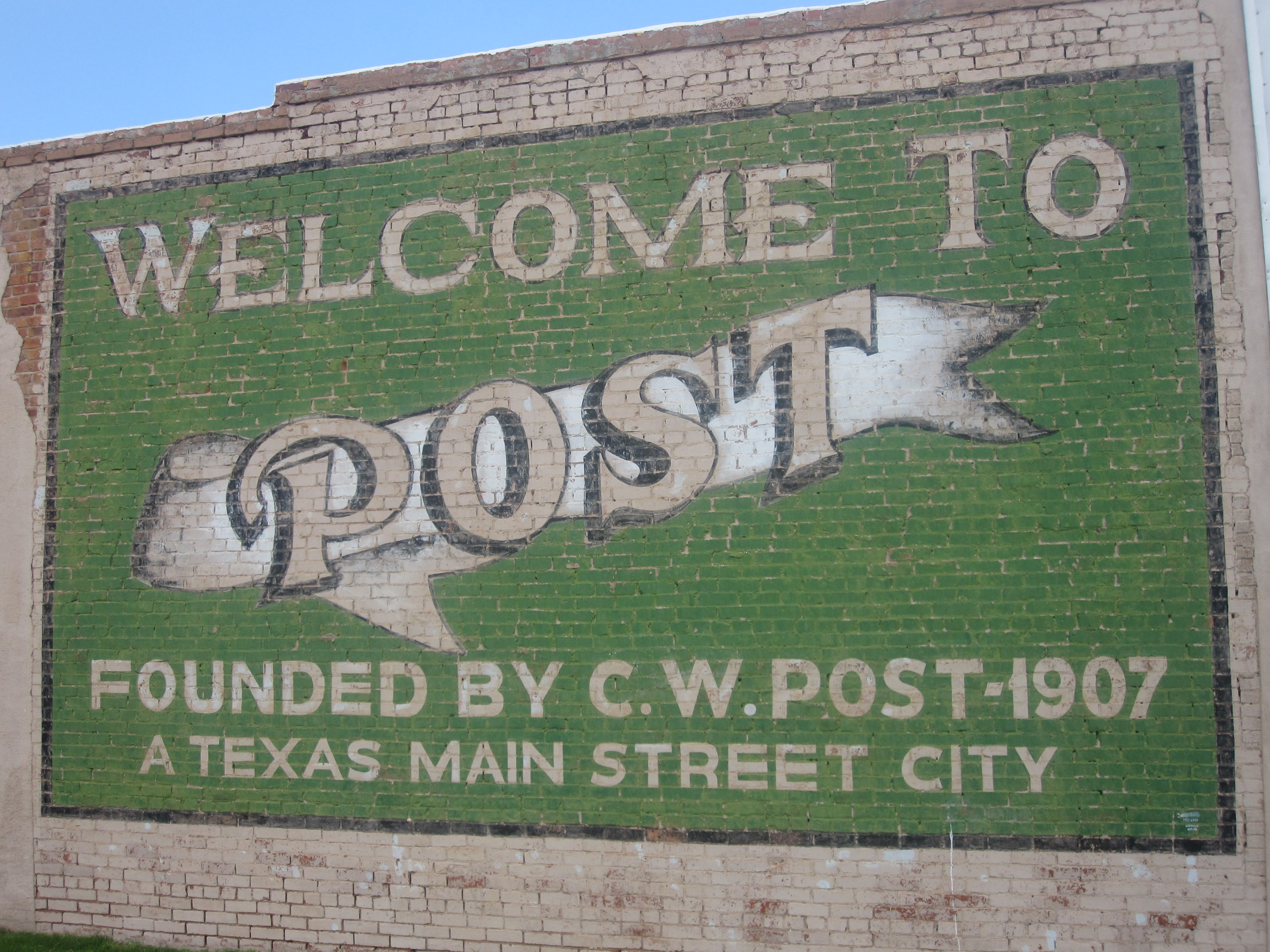
City welcome sign

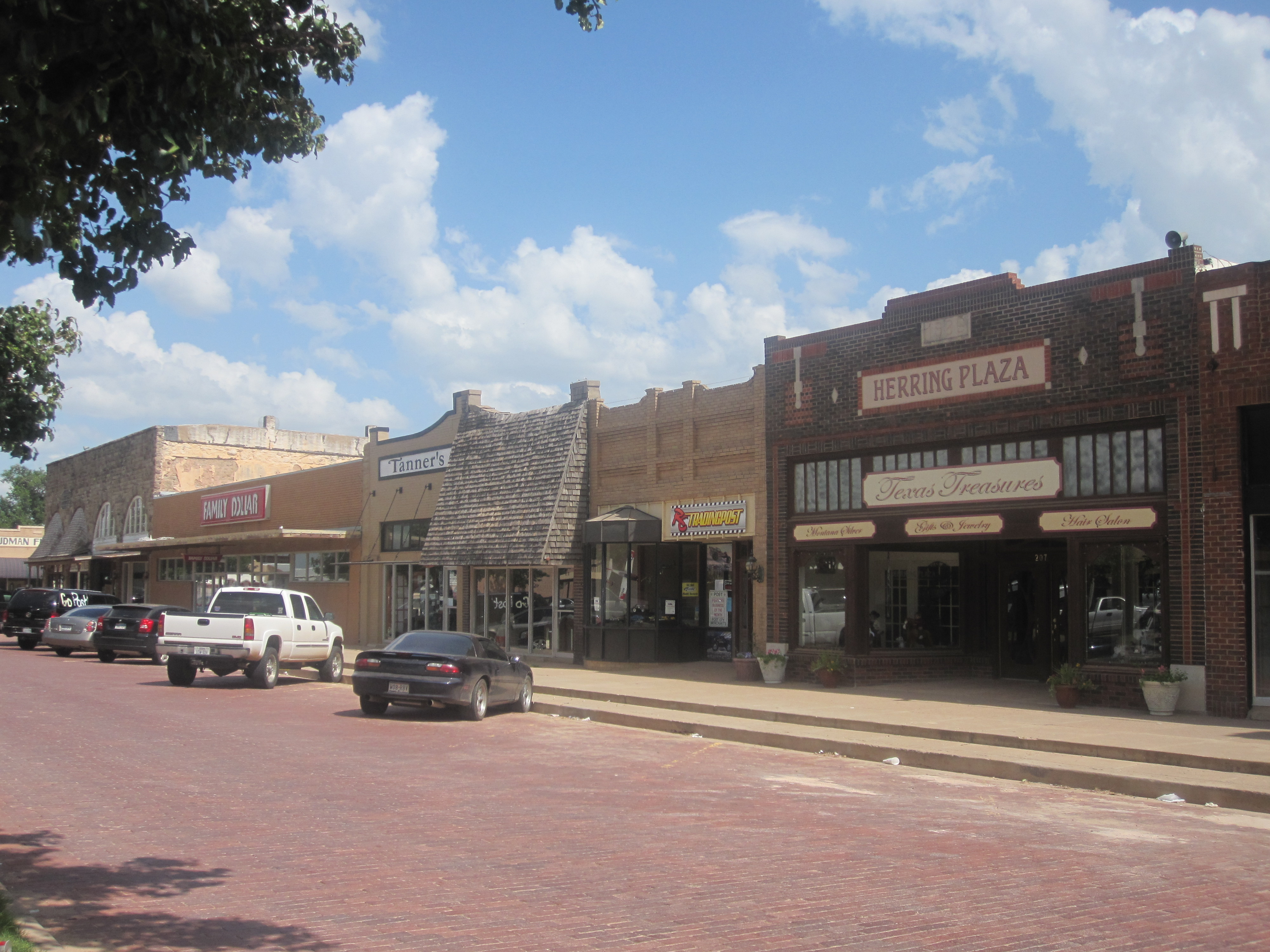
Downtown historic district

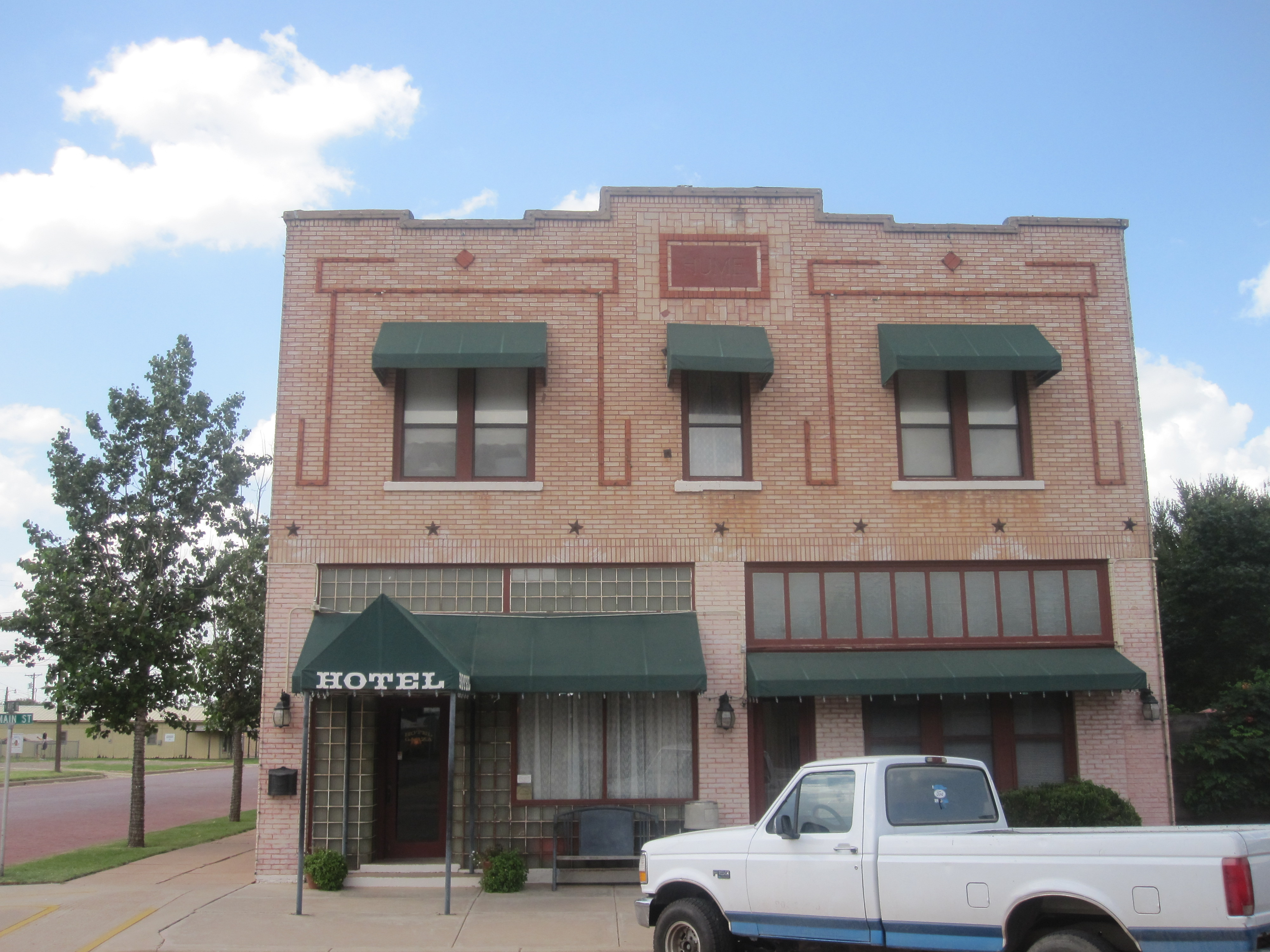
Hotel Garza Bed and Breakfast

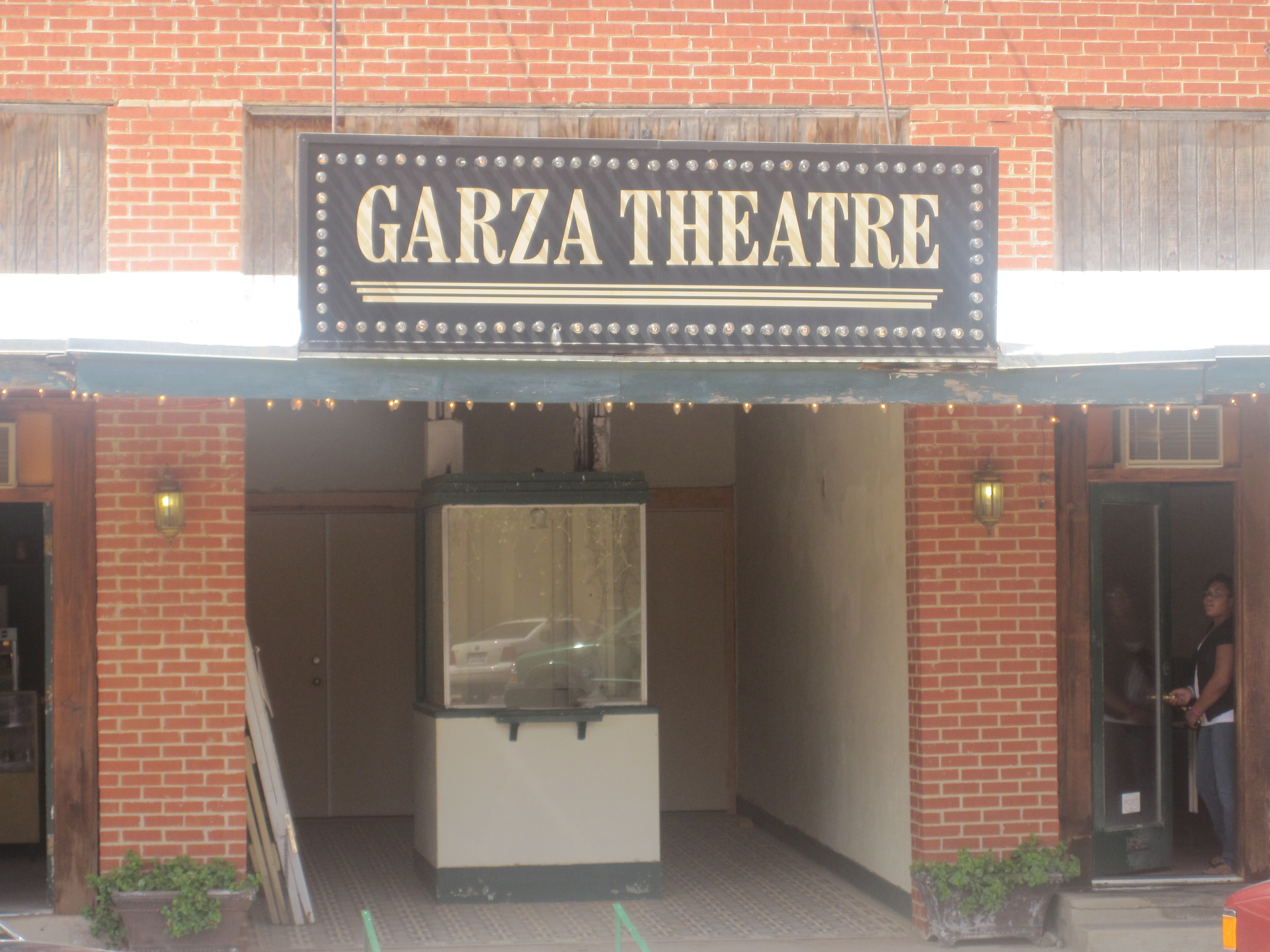
Garza Theatre hosts community events

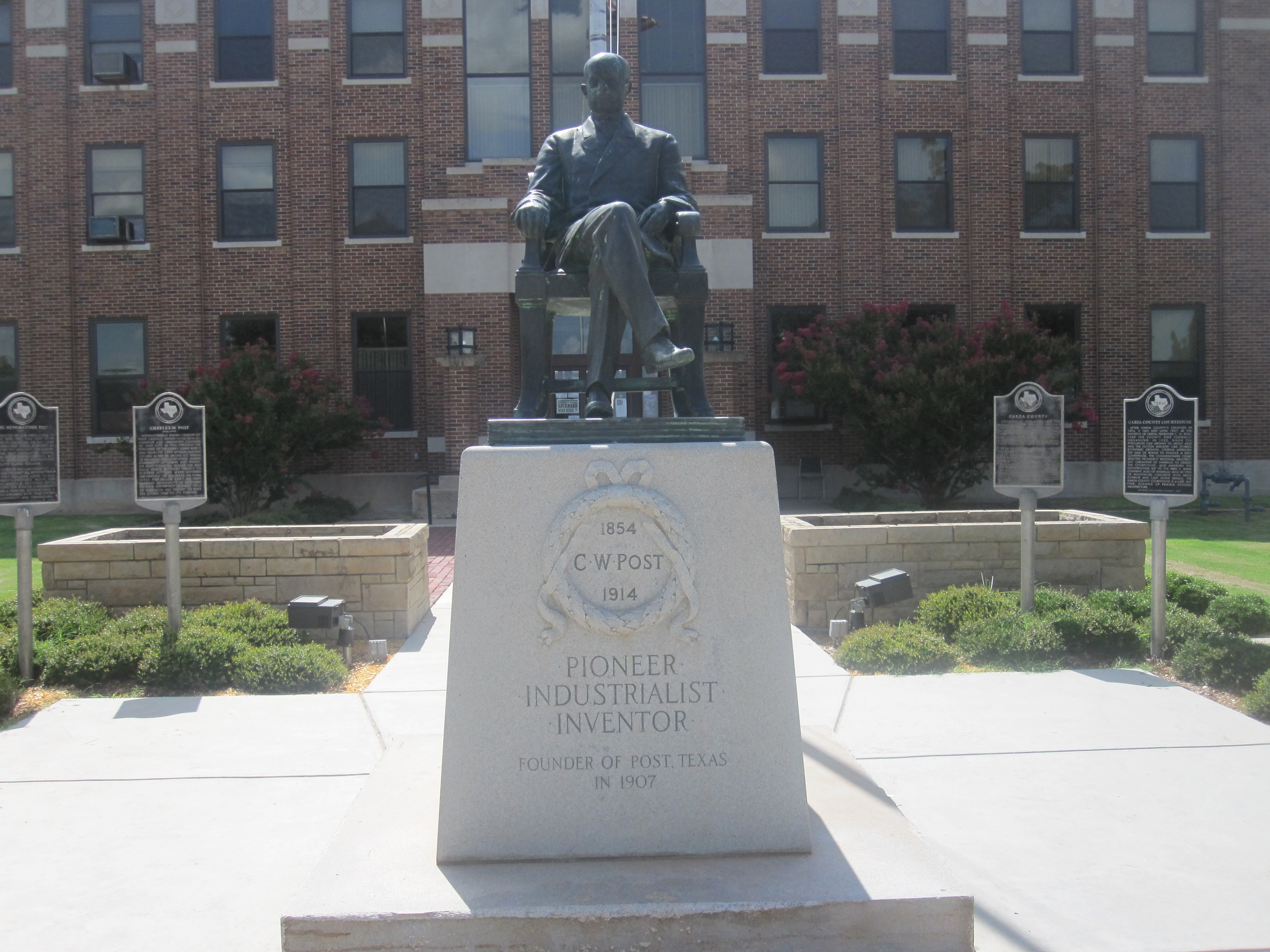
C.W. Post statue in front of the Garza County Courthouse

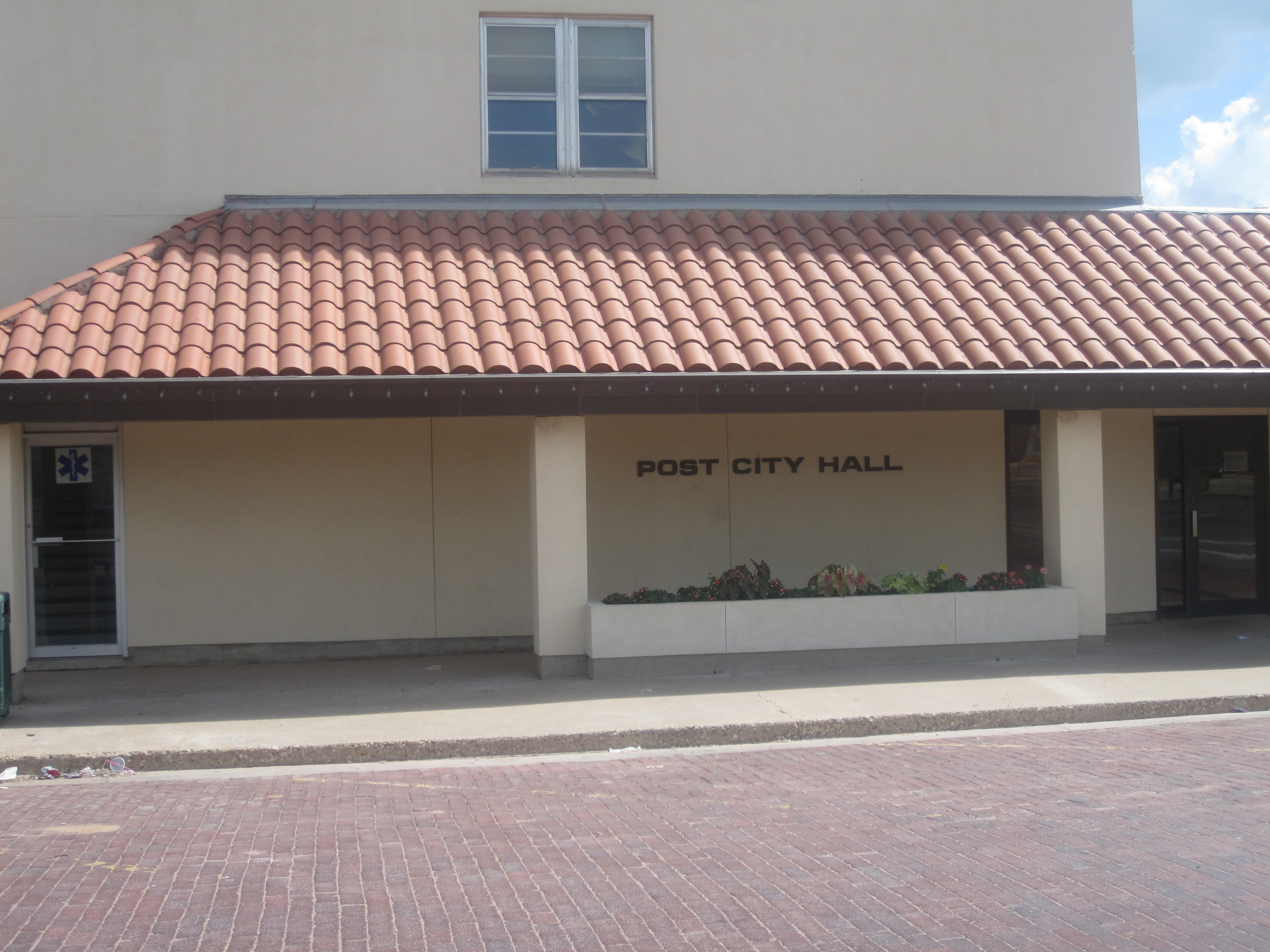
City Hall

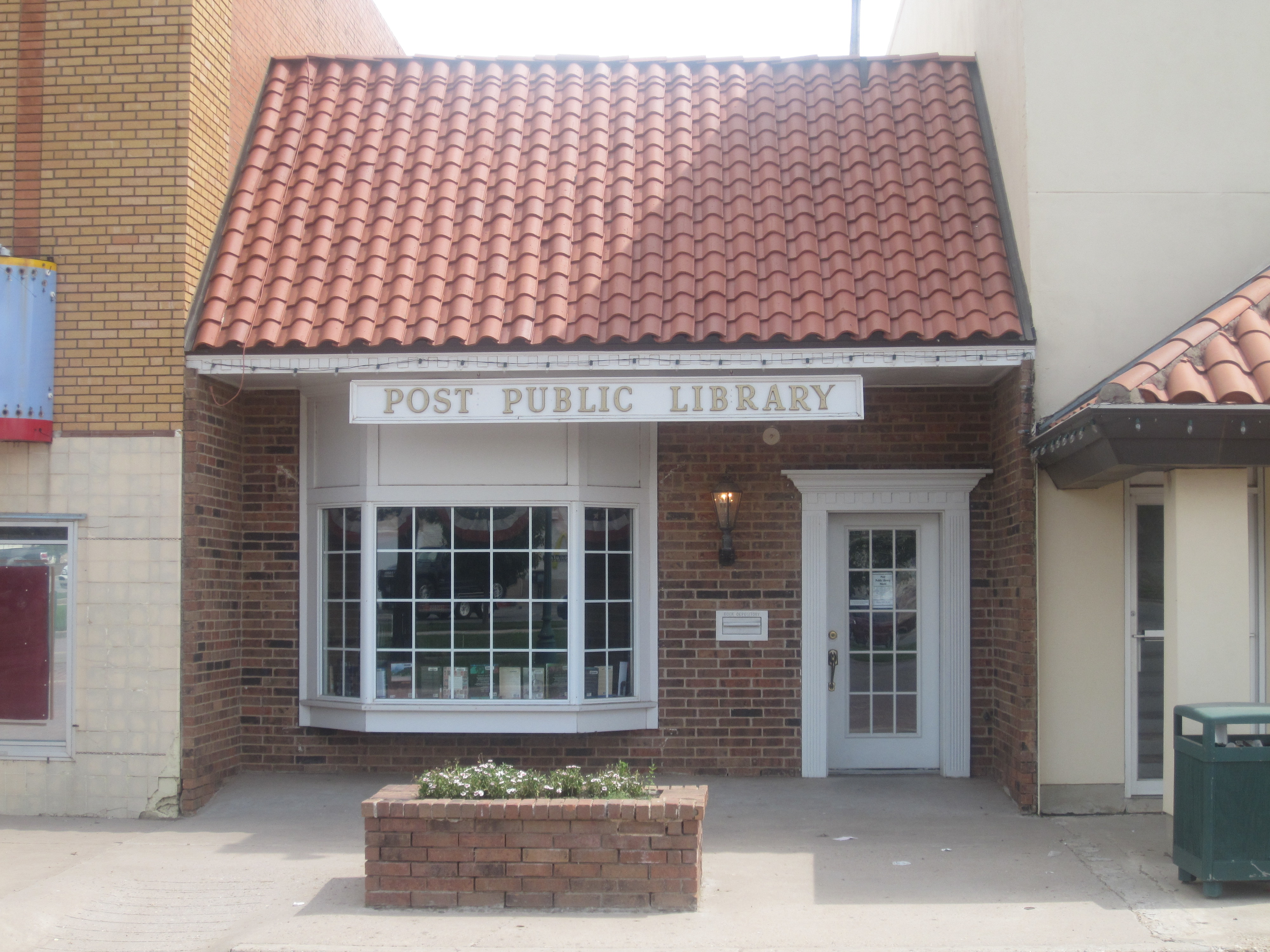
Post Public Library

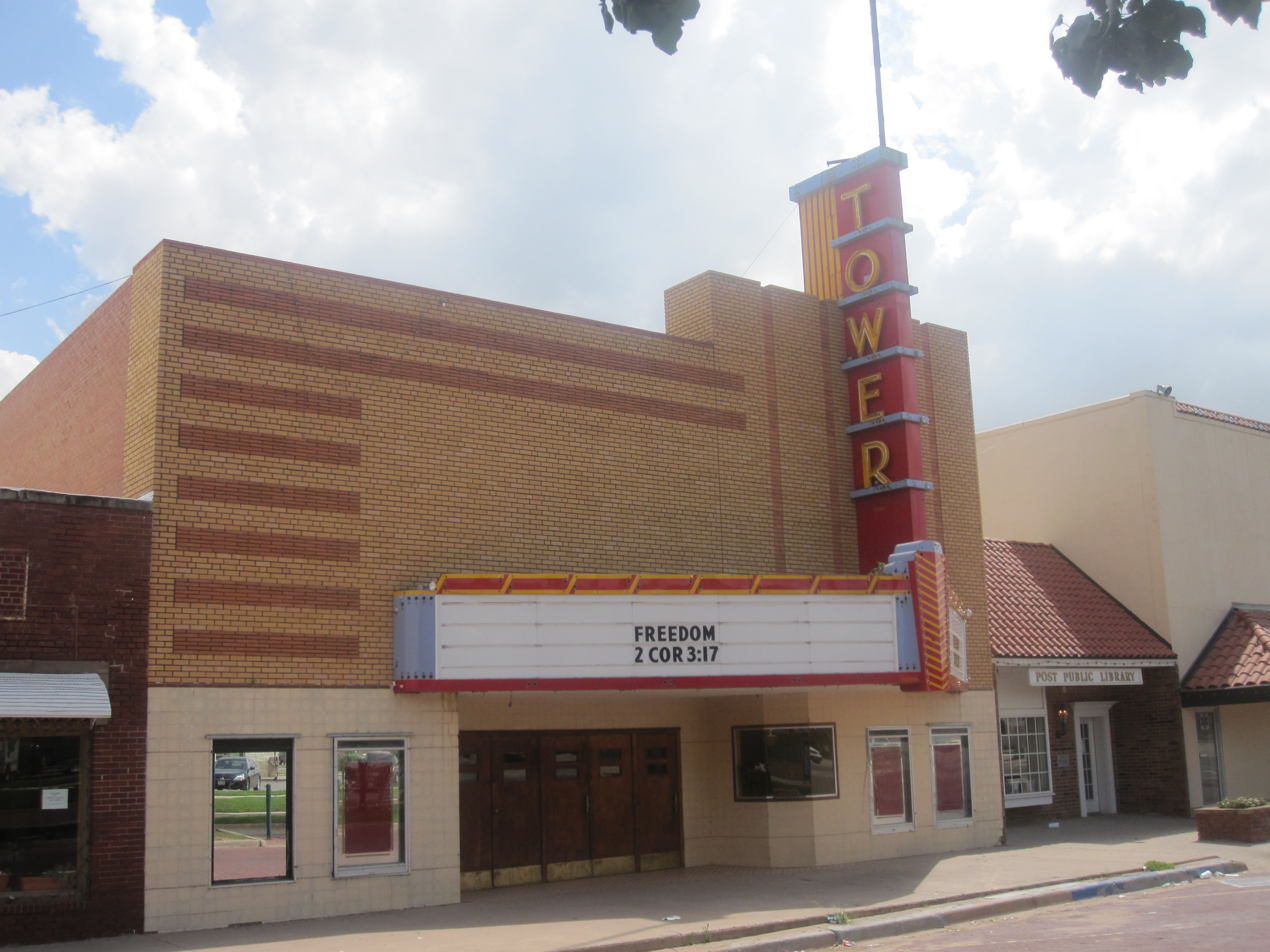
Tower Theater is adjacent to the library

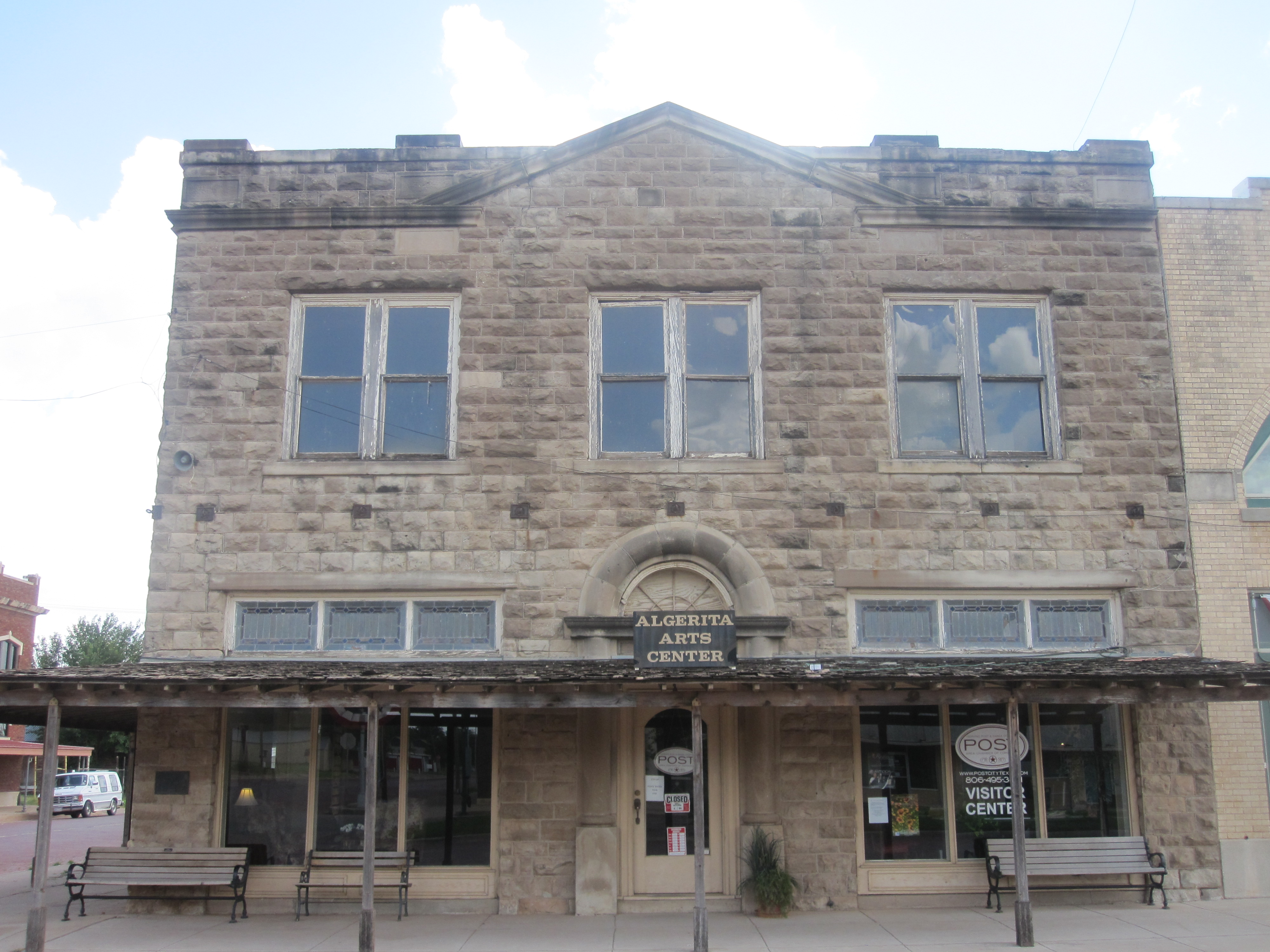
Algerita Arts Center is housed in a former hotel in the Post Historic District.

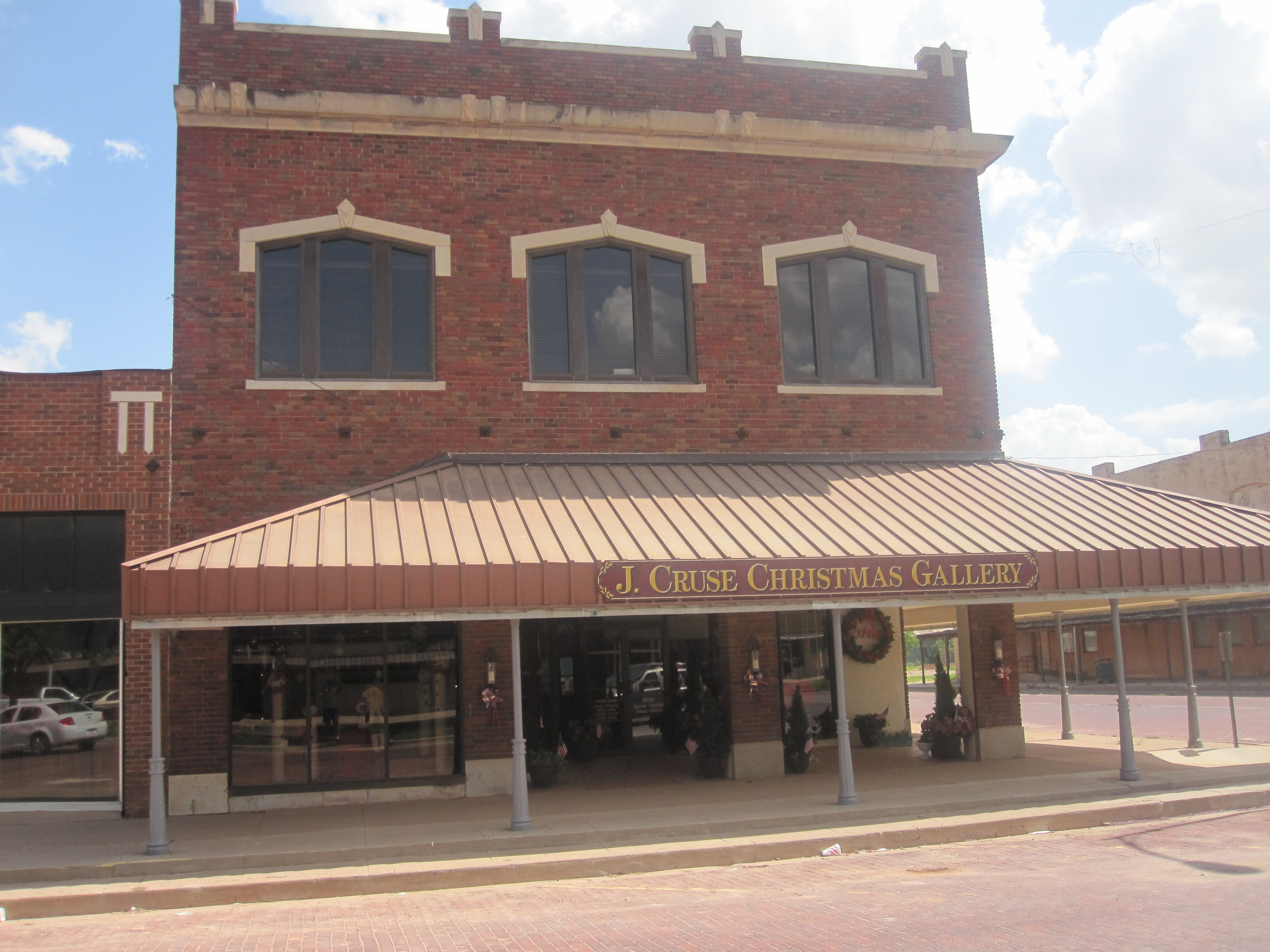
J. Cruse Christmas Gallery downtown; behind the gallery is the OS Museum, developed by Giles McCrary.

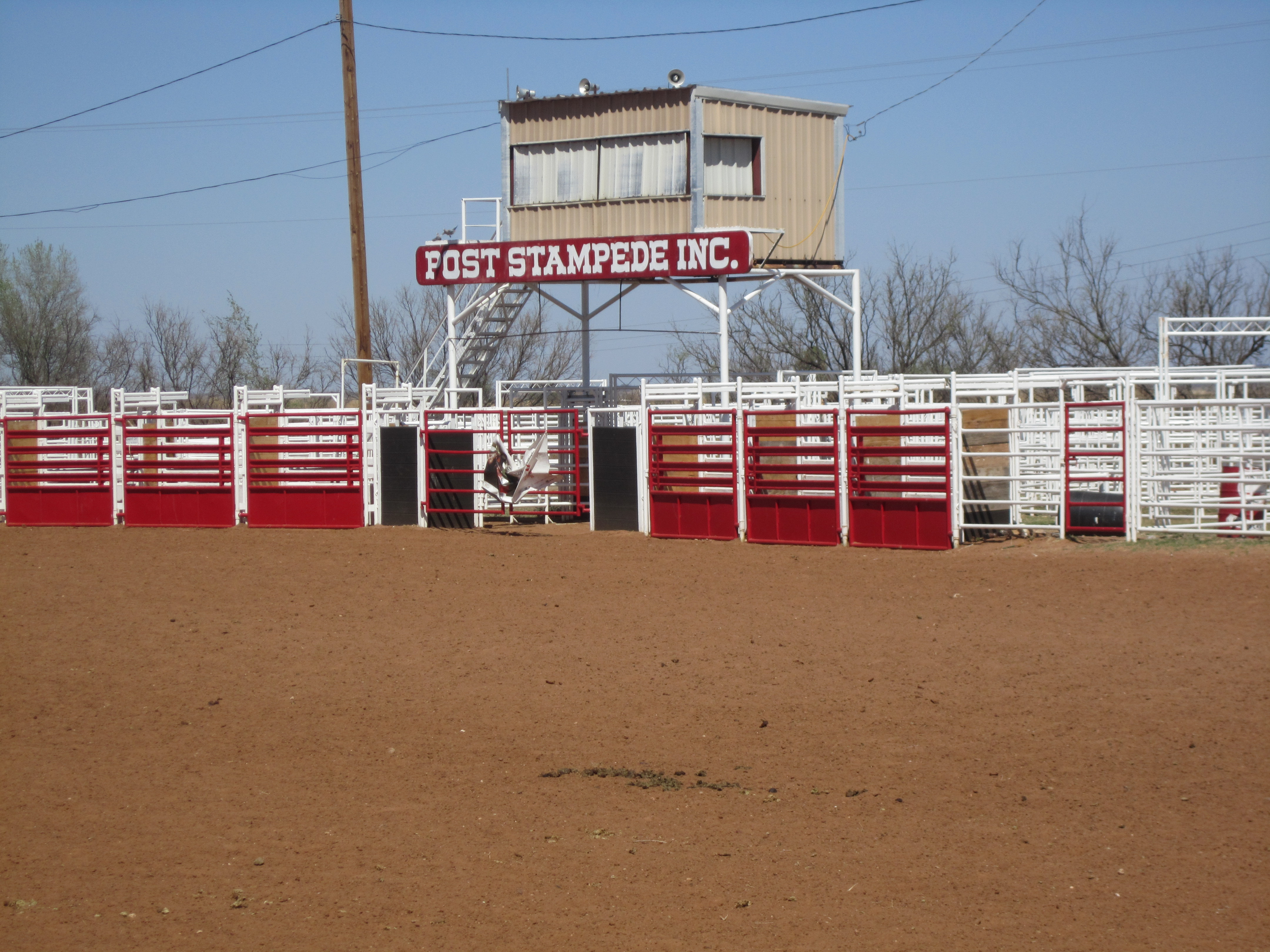
Post Stampede Rodeo stadium

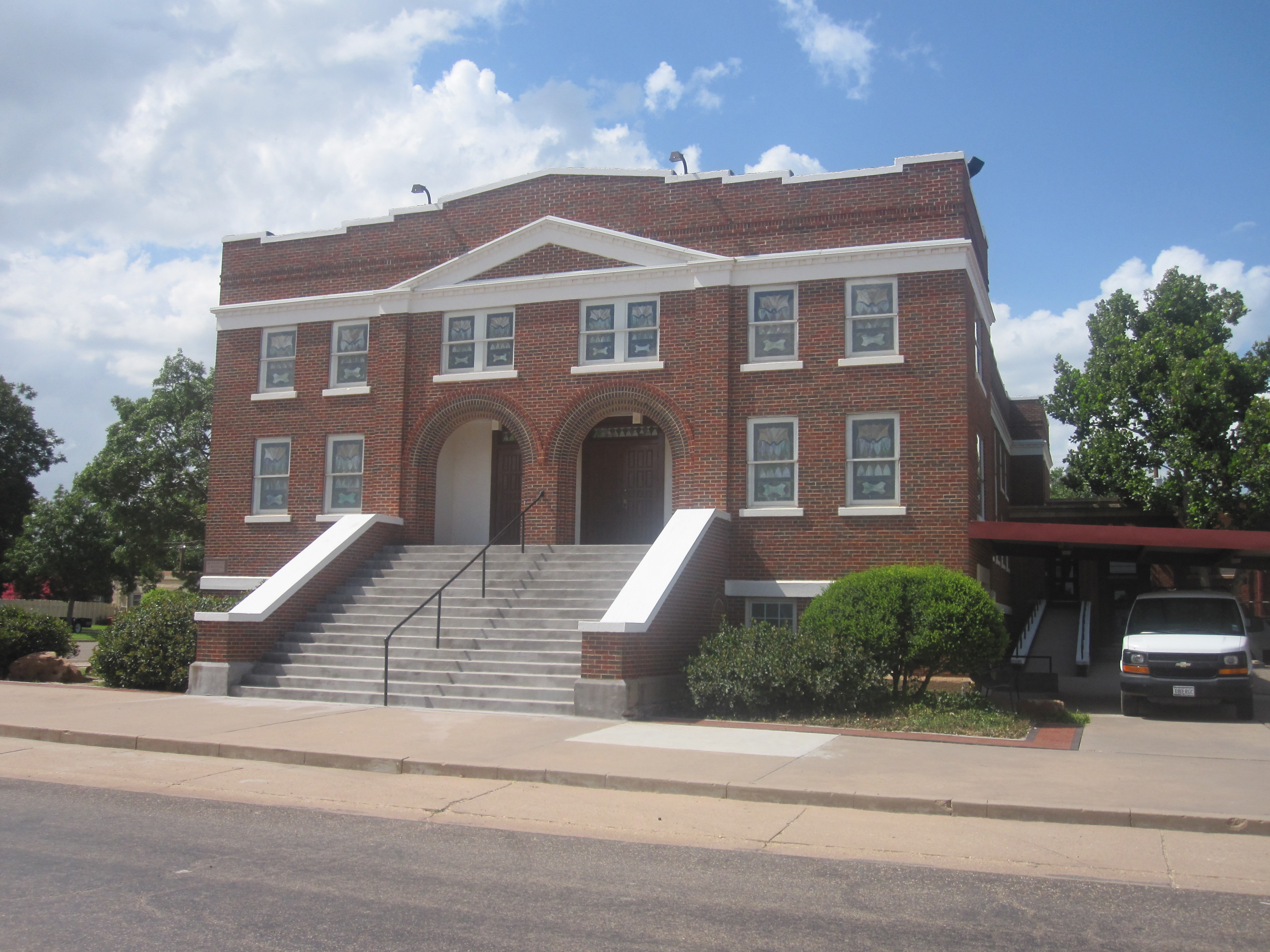
First United Methodist Church at 216 West Tenth Street

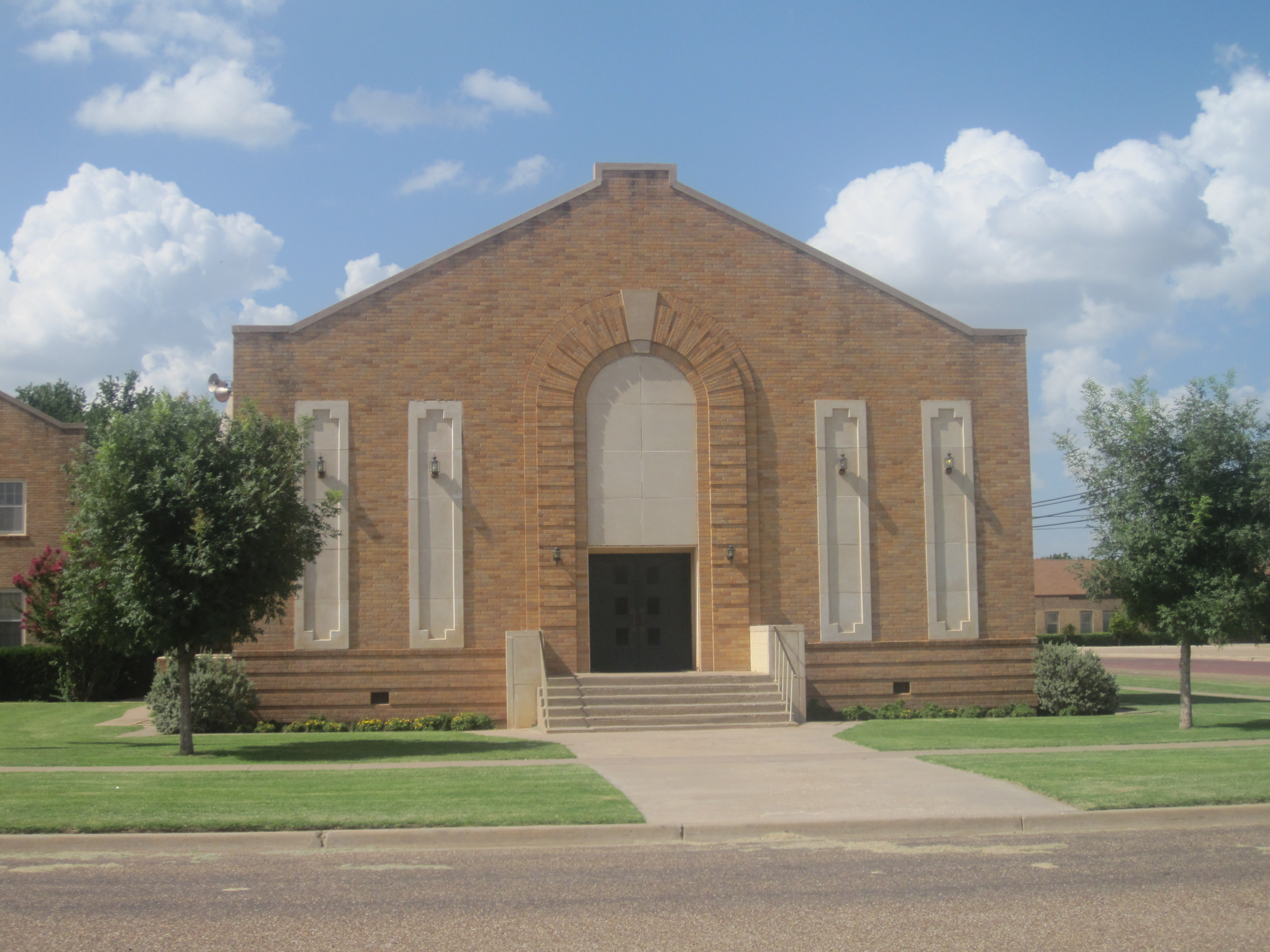
First Baptist Church at 402 West Main Street observed its centennial in 2008.

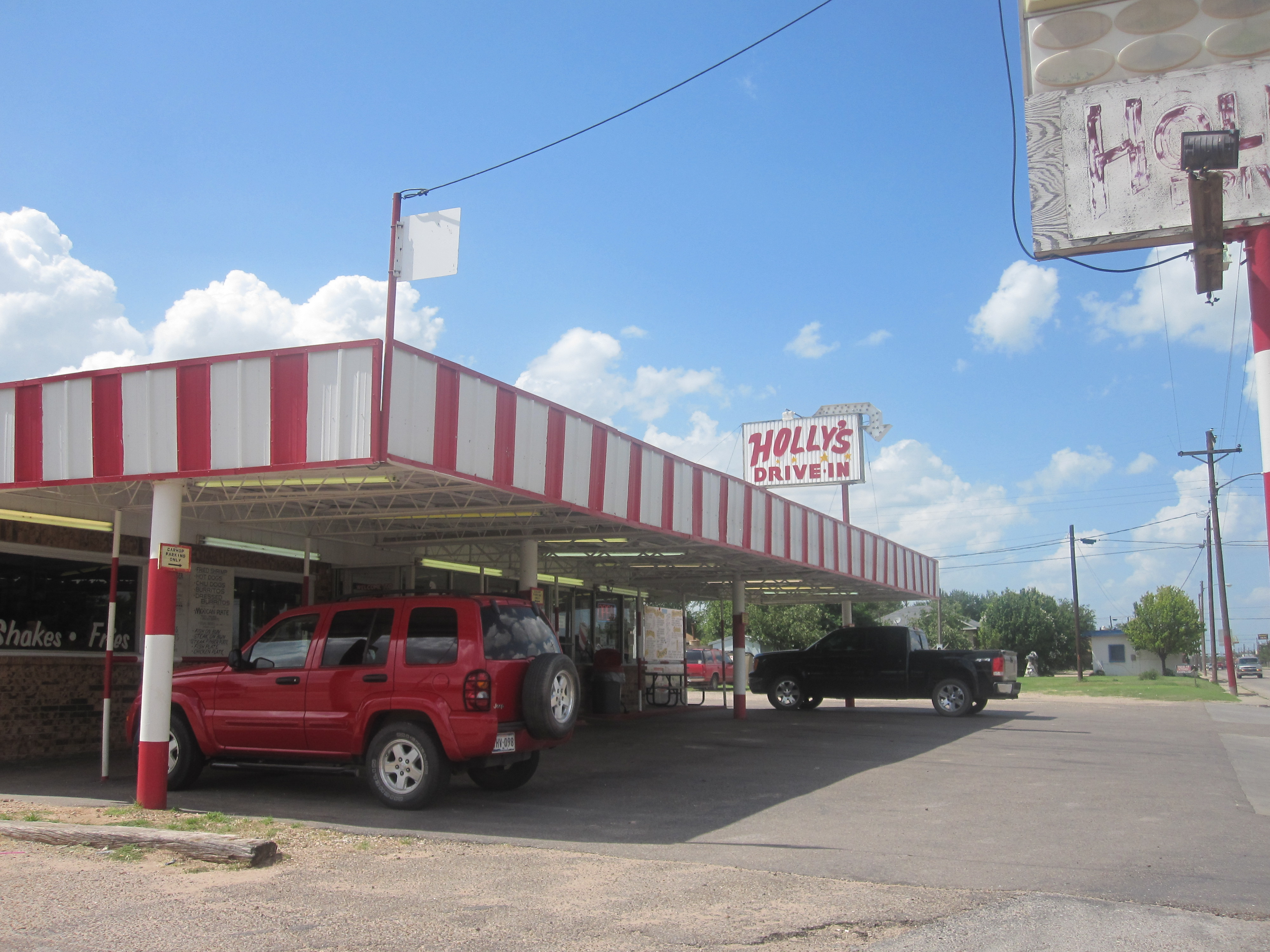
Holly's Drive-In on U.S. Highway 84 in south Post

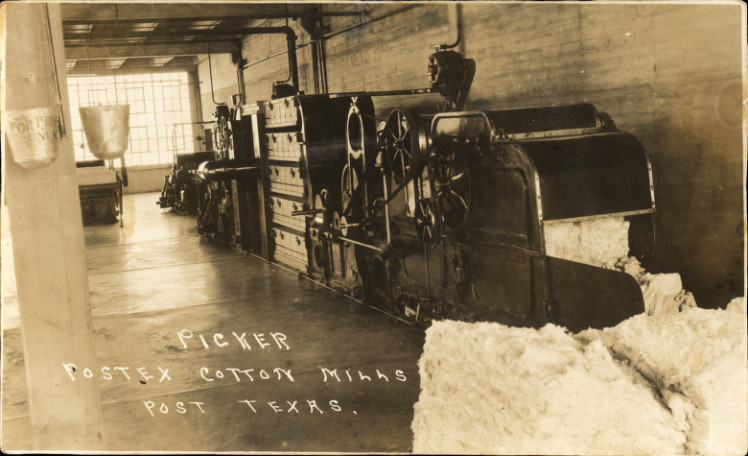
Picker at Postex Cotton Mills, Post, Texas (postcard, c. 1913–1918)

== See also ==
- Close City, Texas, the original site of Post City, Texas
- Double Mountain Fork Brazos River
- Justiceburg, Texas
- Llano Estacado
- West Texas
