= Buffalo Hunters' War =

1877 war between buffalo hunters and the Comanche

Buffalo Hunter's War
- Part of the Texas–Indian wars, Apache Wars
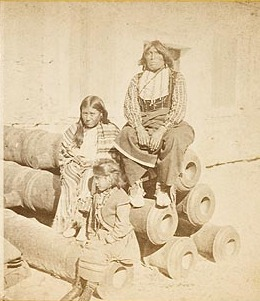
- Black Horse with his wife and child at Fort Marion, Florida.
Date	1876 – 1877
Location	Texas, Oklahoma
Result	Buffalo hunters victory

Commanders and leaders
Hank Campbell - Buffalo hunters	Black Horse - Comanche

The Buffalo Hunters' War, or the Staked Plains War, occurred in 1877. Approximately 170 Comanche warriors and their families led by Quohadi chief Black Horse or Tu-ukumah (died c. 1900) left the Indian Territory in December 1876 for the Llano Estacado of Texas. In February 1877 they, and their Apache allies, began attacking buffalo hunters' camps in the Red River country of the Texas Panhandle, killing or wounding several. They also stole horses from the camp of Pat Garrett.

Forty-five hunters, led by Hank Campbell, Jim Smith, and Joe Freed, and guided by Jose Tafoya, left Rath City, a trading post on the Double Mountain Fork Brazos River. Smoky Hill Thompson remained behind to lead the defense of the trading post.

The party trailed the natives to their camp in Thompson's Canyon, now known as Yellow House Canyon in present-day Lubbock, Texas, where they attacked on March 18. The hunters were repulsed and the natives escaped, including white captive Herman Lehmann, who was wounded in the battle.

The hunters' casualties were four wounded and one later dying from wounds. It was later reported by the military that the natives suffered 35 dead and 22 wounded.

== See also ==
- Buffalo Soldier tragedy of 1877
