= Rath City, Texas =

- Ghost Town
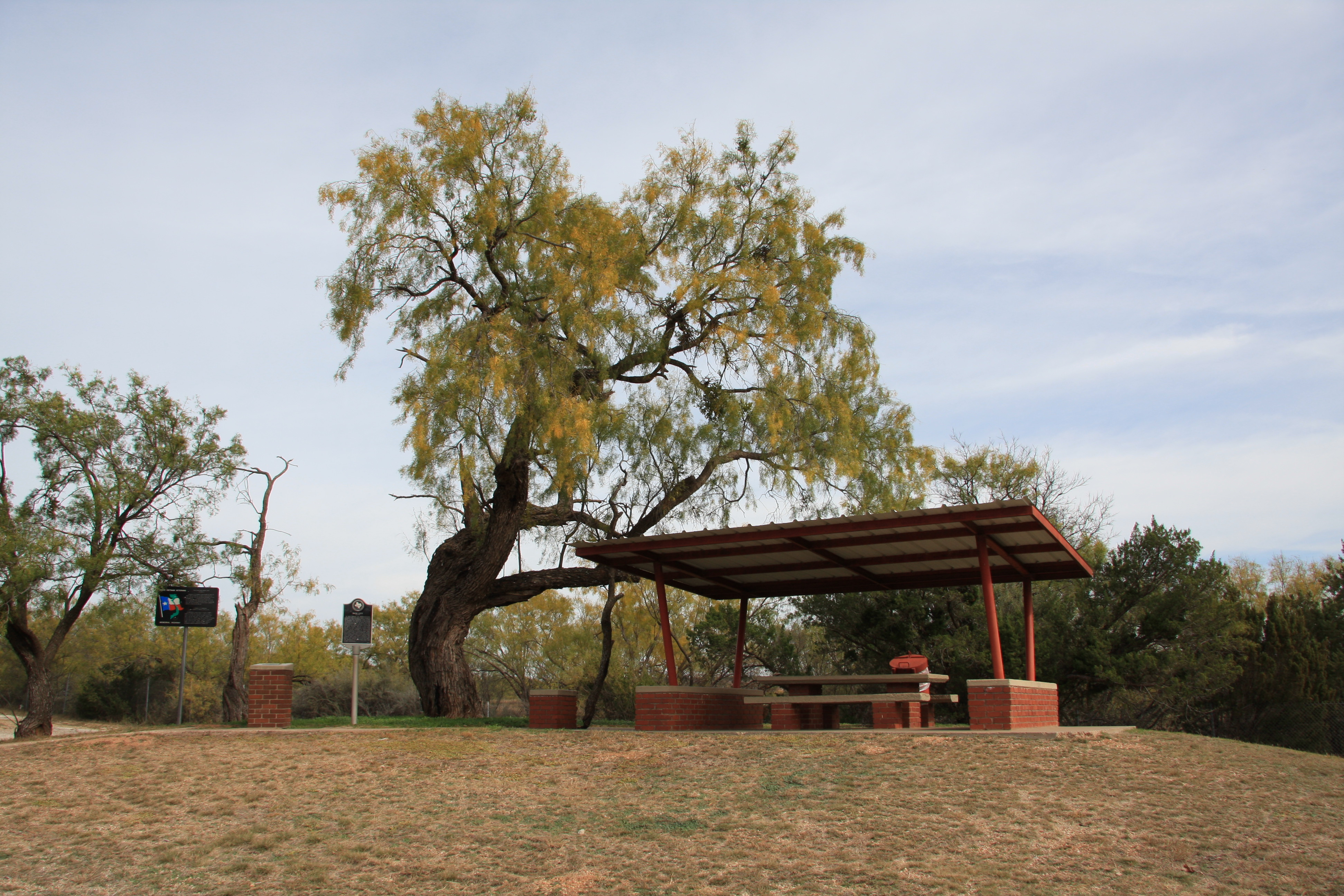
- Historical marker and rest stop at site of former Rath City

- Location within Texas Location within the United States
- Coordinates: 33°00′35″N 100°10′54″W
- Country: United States
- State: Texas
- County: Stonewall County, Texas
- River: Double Mountain Fork
- Established: 1876
- Founder: Charles Rath
- Elevation: 1,660 ft (510 m)
- Time zone: UTC-6 (CST)

Rath City was a frontier town that existed for fewer than five years, and is now a ghost town. The town was located on the Double Mountain Fork Brazos River, 14 miles northwest of Hamlin in southern Stonewall County, Texas, United States.

== History ==
The town was founded in 1876. Its original establishment was meant to capitalize on the buffalo trade, and it was Stonewall County's first settlement. In 1877, the town housed a store, two saloons, a dance hall, and a few tents and dugouts. The town's namesake was Charles Rath, whose store, built in 1875, was the structure around which the village grew. A declining buffalo population ended the settlement, and it was abandoned in 1880.

== Rath City and Native Americans ==
In February 1877, after buffalo hunter Marshall Sewell was killed by Native Americans, Rath City became a rallying point for over 500 frontiersmen. A group of 46 men left Rath City in pursuit of a Comanche war party led by Black Horse, in a campaign known as the Buffalo Hunters' War or Staked Plains War. The men pursued the Comanche to a site in present-day Lubbock. A battle ensued on March 18, 1877, at Yellow House Canyon; its results were inconclusive. The hunters returned to Rath City, thus ending one of the last Indian campaigns on the southern plains.

== See also ==
- Canyon Valley, Texas
- Double Mountains (Texas)
- List of ghost towns in Texas
- Llano Estacado
- Salt Fork Brazos River
