= Mary Jemison =

Scots-Irish American captured and adopted by Seneca natives (1743–1833)

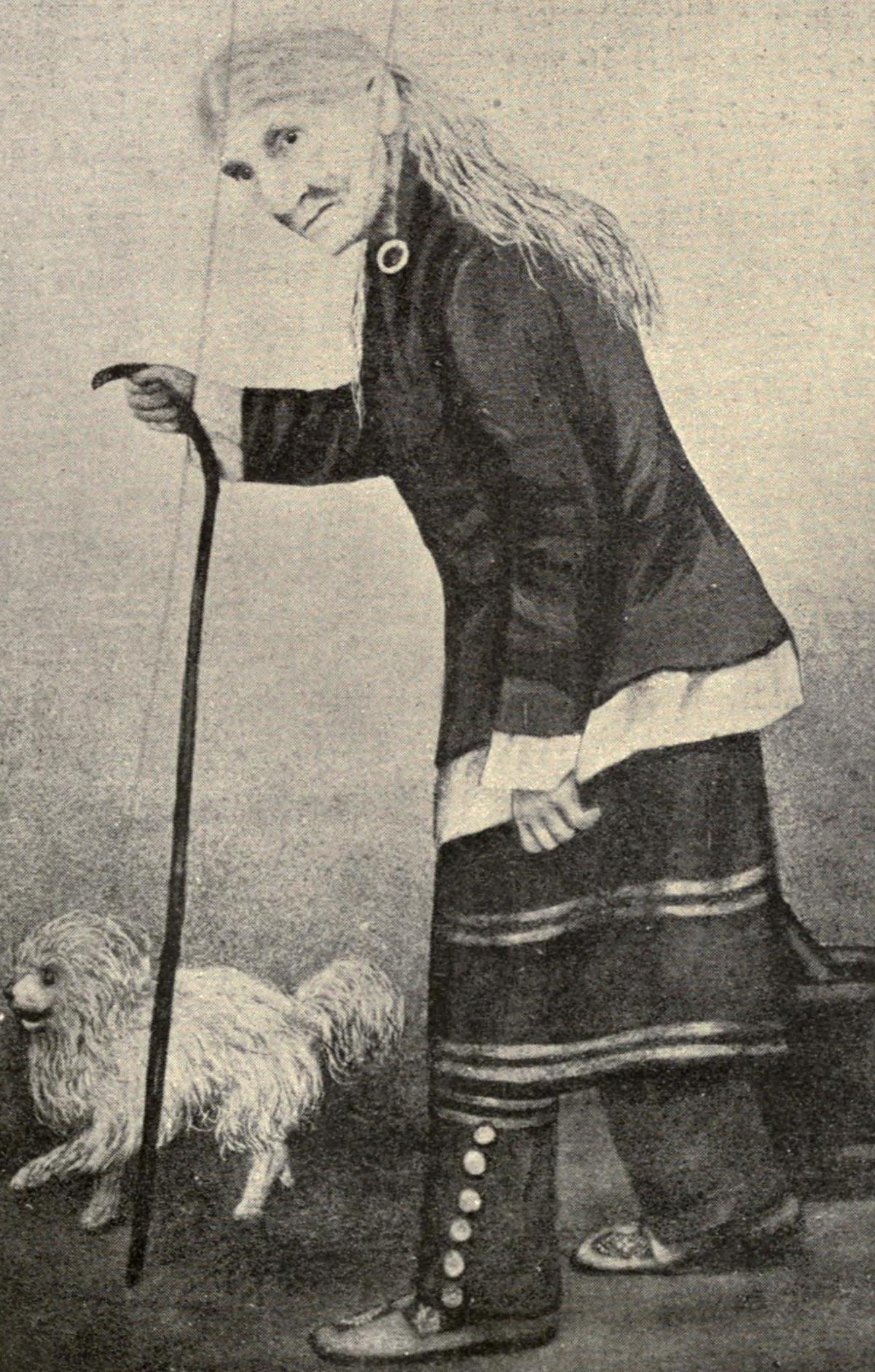
- Illustration, from an 1892 account of missionary activity in upstate New York
- Born: Mary Jemison; 1743; At sea on the Atlantic Ocean
- Died: September 19, 1833 (aged 89–90); Buffalo Creek Reservation
- Other name: Dehgewänis
- Known for: adopted Seneca and for her memoir

Mary Jemison (Deh-he-wä-nis) (1743 – September 19, 1833) was a Scots-Irish colonial frontierswoman in Pennsylvania and New York, who became known as the "White Woman of the Genesee." As a young girl, she was kidnapped by a group of Shawnee and French men, and was later adopted into a family of the Seneca, assimilating to their culture, marrying twice to Native American men and having children with both. In 1824, she published a memoir of her life.

During the French and Indian War, in spring 1755, twelve year-old Jemison was captured with most of her family in a Shawnee raid in what is now Adams County, Pennsylvania. The rest of her family was murdered. She and an unrelated young boy were adopted by Seneca families. She became fully assimilated, marrying a Delaware (Lenape), and, after his death, a Seneca man. She chose to remain a Seneca rather than return to American colonial culture.

Jemison told her story late in life to an American minister, who wrote it for her. He published it, a form of captivity narrative, as Narrative of the Life of Mrs. Mary Jemison (1824). It was reprinted in the late 20th century. In 1874 her remains were reinterred near a historic Seneca council house on a private estate, in what is now Letchworth State Park.

== Biography ==
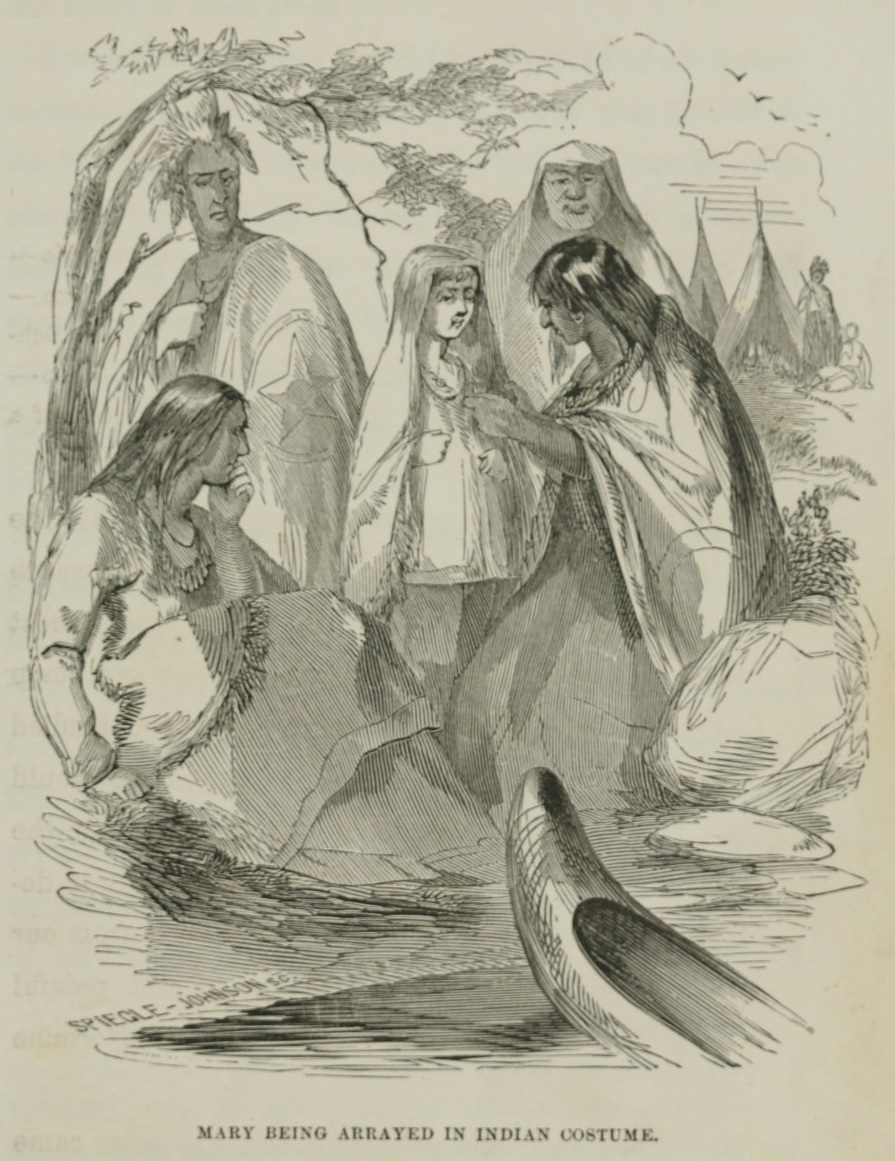
"Mary being arrayed in Indian costume", illustration published in an 1856 biography of Jemison

Jemison was born to Thomas and Jane Jemison aboard the ship William and Mary in the fall of 1743, while en route from British Ireland (in today's Northern Ireland) to America. They landed in Philadelphia, Pennsylvania, and joined other Protestant Scots-Irish immigrants in heading west to settle on cheaper lands in the backcountry, what was then the western frontier (now central Pennsylvania). They "squatted" on territory that had been purchased by the Penn family in 1736 from chiefs of the Iroquois Confederacy, six nations that were based in central and western New York.

The Jemisons had cleared land to develop their farm, and the couple had several children. By 1755, conflicts had started in the French and Indian War, the North American front of the Seven Years' War between France and Britain. Both sides made use of Native American allies, especially in the frontier areas where they had few regular forces. One morning in early 1755, a raiding party consisting of six Shawnee Indians and four Frenchmen captured Mary, the rest of her family (except two older brothers), and a young boy from another family. En route to French-controlled Fort Duquesne (present-day Pittsburgh), the Shawnee killed Mary's mother, father, and siblings, and ritually scalped them.

Mary later learned that it was a Seneca custom, when one of their own was killed or taken prisoner in battle, to take an enemy as prisoner or to take their scalp in a mourning ritual. Two Seneca women had lost a brother in the French and Indian War a year before Mary's capture, and in this mourning raid, the Shawnee intended to capture a prisoner or obtain an enemy's scalp to compensate them. The 12-year-old Mary and the young boy were spared, likely because they were of suitable age for forced adoption. Once the party reached Fort Duquesne, Mary was given to the two Seneca women, who took her downriver to their settlement. After a short ceremony, a Seneca family adopted Mary, renaming her as Deh-he-wä-nis (other romanization variants include: Dehgewanus, Dehgewanus and Degiwanus, Dickewamis). She learned this meant "a pretty girl, a handsome girl, or a pleasant, good thing."

When she came of age, Mary married a Delaware man named Sheninjee, who was living with the band. They had a son whom she named Thomas after her father. Sheninjee took her on a long journey to the Sehgahunda Valley along the Genesee River in present-day Western New York state. Although Jemison and their son reached this destination, her husband did not. While hunting one day on their journey, he was taken ill and died.

As a widow, Mary and her child were taken in by Sheninjee's clan relatives; she made her home at Little Beard's Town (where present-day Cuylerville, New York later developed). She married again, to a Seneca named Hiokatoo, and together they had seven children: Nancy, Polly, Betsey, Jane, John, Thomas, and Jesse. John had a troubled life. He killed his brother Thomas in 1811, then killed his brother Jesse in 1812, and was later also killed.

During the American Revolutionary War, the Seneca allied with the British, hoping that a British victory would enable them to expel the encroaching colonists. Jemison's account of her life includes observations of this time. She and others in the Seneca town helped supply Joseph Brant (Mohawk) and his Iroquois warriors from various nations, who fought the rebel colonists.

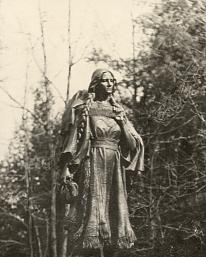
Statue of Jemison in upstate New York. 1910 photo

After the war, the British ceded their holdings east of the Mississippi River to the United States, without consulting their Native American allies. The Seneca were forced to give up their lands to the United States. In 1797, the Seneca sold much of their land at Little Beard's Town to Americans. At that time, during negotiations with the Holland Land Company held at Geneseo, New York, Mary Jemison proved to be an able negotiator for the Seneca tribe. She helped win more favorable terms for surrendering their rights to the land at the Treaty of Big Tree (1797).

Late in life, Jemison told her story to the minister James E. Seaver, who published it as Narrative of the Life of Mrs. Mary Jemison (1824; latest edition published 1967). It is considered a classic captivity narrative. Although some early readers thought that Seaver must have imposed his own beliefs, since the late 20th century, many history scholars have thought the memoir is a reasonably accurate account of Jemison's life story and attitude. When she was given her liberty, she decided to stay with the Senecas, because her eldest warrior son was not allowed to go with her and, mostly, she feared her relatives "... would despise [my Indian children] if not myself; and treat us as enemies; or, at least with a degree of cold indifference, which I thought I could not endure."

In 1823, the Seneca sold most of their remaining land in that area, except for a 2-acre (8,100 m^{2}) tract of land reserved for Jemison's use. Known by local European-American residents as the "White Woman of the Genesee", Jemison lived on the tract for several years. In 1831 she sold it and moved to the Buffalo Creek Reservation, where some Seneca lived (others had gone to Ontario, Canada). Jemison died on September 19, 1833, aged 90. She was initially buried on the Buffalo Creek Reservation. Jemison's heirs later changed their surname to "Jimerson" and established the community of Jimersontown on the Allegany Indian Reservation.

=== Mary's account of her capture ===
Mary Jemison recounted that she was taken captive by a party of six Native Americans and four Frenchmen, who plundered her family’s home for bread, meat, and meal before fleeing into the woods. During their forced march, the captors used a whip to keep the children moving and denied them food and water, sometimes forcing them to drink urine when they cried from thirst. They were made to sleep without shelter or fire, and closely guarded throughout the night.

At sunrise, the captors halted to share food taken from her family’s home. All the prisoners ate, except for Mary’s father, who was overcome with despair and refused nourishment. As they resumed their march, they passed Fort Canagojigge, where Mary heard her father speak for the last time.

That evening, the group stopped near a swamp to encamp again. Though given bread and meat, the captives found little comfort due to the fear and uncertainty they faced. An Indian placed moccasins on Mary’s feet, which her mother interpreted as a sign that Mary’s life might be spared. Her mother then gave her a tearful farewell, urging her to remember her name, her prayers, and not to attempt escape if she ever had the chance, for fear of being killed.

Shortly afterwards, Mary and a young boy were led away from the others. As they settled in for the night, the boy begged her to escape with him, but Mary refused, recalling her mother’s warnings. That night, her worst fears were confirmed: her parents, siblings, and fellow captives were tomahawked, scalped, and mutilated.

After another day’s march, they camped in a thicket. The captors built a fire and dried their captives’ limbs. That night, Mary witnessed the Indians preparing the scalps of her murdered family. They stretched them on hoops, dried and scraped them by the fire, then combed and painted the hair. Mary recognised her family members by the colour and texture of their hair. Though horrified, she endured the sight in silence. The Indians told her they would not have killed the family if the whites had not pursued them.

== Legacy and honors ==
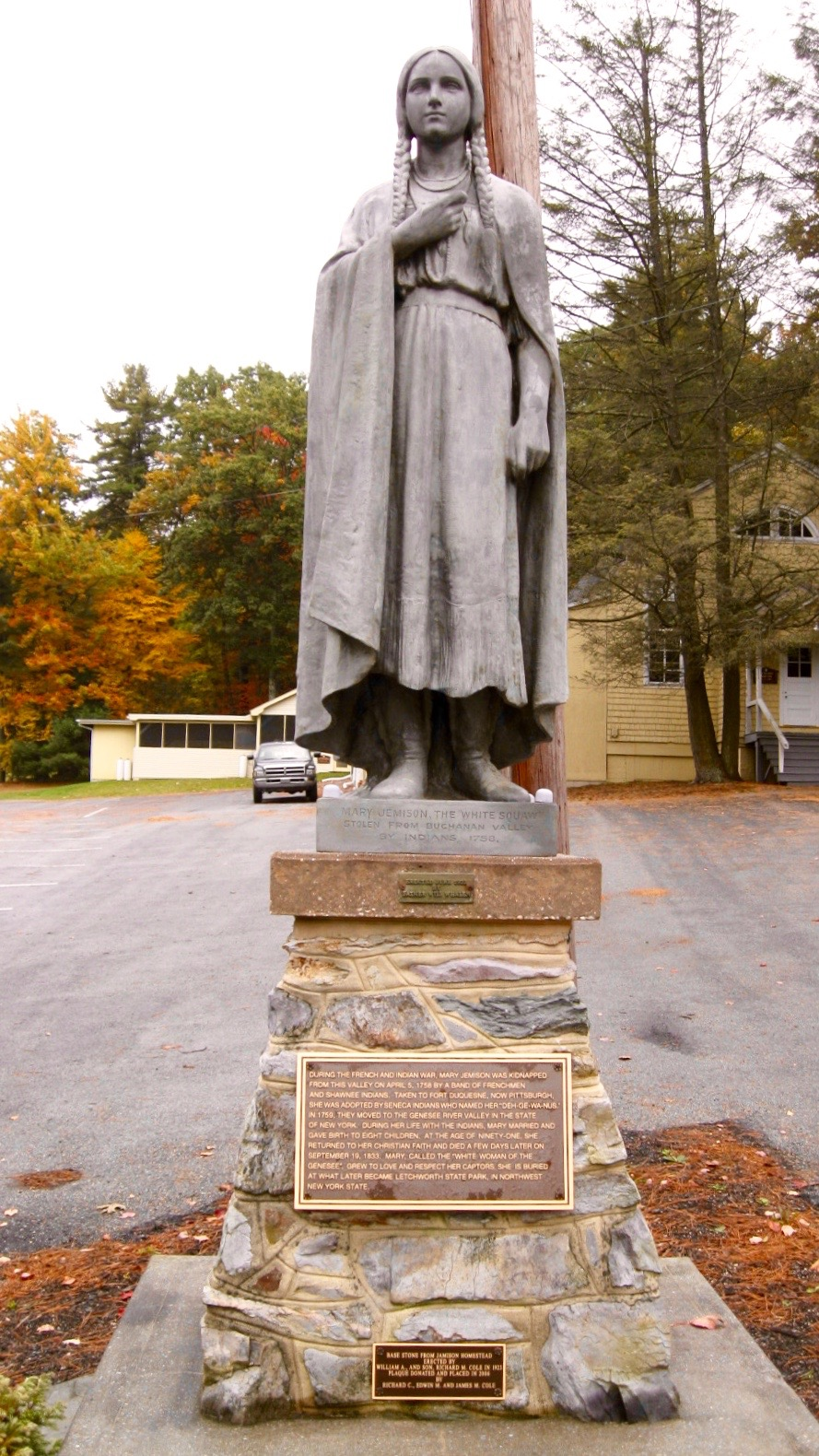
Statue of Jemison, near her home in Adams County, Pennsylvania, erected in 1921

- In 1874, at the request of her descendants, Jemison's remains were transferred and reinterred near the 1765 Seneca Council House, which had been moved from the former Caneadea Reservation. The building had been purchased by William Pryor Letchworth and relocated to his Glen Iris Estate near the present-day town of Castile. He had the structure restored in 1872 by John Shanks, a Seneca grandson of Jemison. Letchworth invited Seneca and state officials that year for a rededication of the Council House. In 1881, Letchworth acquired a cabin formerly belonging to Mary's daughter, Nancy Jemison. He had it moved from Gardeau Flats to near the Council House and Mary's gravesite. In 1906 he bequeathed his entire estate to New York, which today lies within the grounds of Letchworth State Park.
- A bronze statue of Mary Jemison, created in 1910 by Henry Kirke Bush-Brown, marks her grave. Following state restoration of the grounds to Letchworth's time, in 2006 the memorial was reinstalled between the council house and cabin. Dr. George Frederick Kunz helped pay for and commission the 1910 memorial to Jemison.

== In popular culture ==
- Indian Captive: The Story of Mary Jemison (1941) is a fictional version of Jemison's story for all readers, written and illustrated by Lois Lenski. In this novel, Jemison is given the name: "Little Woman of Great Courage." by her willingness to give up the life of a white woman to become an Indian woman at the end of the book. Before, her name in the novel was Corn Tassel because her hair was the color of the tassels on ripe corn.
- Rayna M. Gangi's novel, Mary Jemison: White Woman of the Seneca (1996), is a fictional version of Jemison's story.
- Deborah Larsen's novel, The White (2002), is a fictional version of Jemison's life. It imagines her process of assimilation to the Seneca culture in which she lived.
- Jeanne LeMonnier Gardner's book, "Mary Jemison: Indian Captive" (Original title: "Mary Jemison: Seneca Captive") 1966, is a fictionalized account for children.
- Jack Watson's 2015 novel, Two Voices Falling, is based on Jemison's account of her life as told to Dr. James Seaver, as well as written narratives of people who knew her.

== See also ==
- Herman Lehmann
- Olive Oatman
- Mary Ann Oatman
- Cynthia Ann Parker
- Frances Slocum
