= Oatman Flat =

Landform in Maricopa County, Arizona

Oatman Flat, is a flat, south of Oatman Mountain, on the south bank of the Gila River and north of the mouth of Wild Horse Canyon in Maricopa County, Arizona. The flat was named for the Oatman family that was massacred in their camp on the bluff overlooking the flat in 1851. They were later buried there along the Southern Emigrant Trail overlooking the flat that bears their name. What became known as Oatman Grave 33°00′15″N 113°09′23″W, on the flat below is a memorial and not the grave site.

Oatman Flat was the location of the Oatman Flat Station a stagecoach station of the Butterfield Overland Mail from 1858 to 1861. Following the American Civil War a traveller's guide to the American West published in 1866 reported that it was 343 miles from San Diego Barracks to Oatman Flat via the wagon roads and footpaths of the day.

When stagecoach traffic returned in 1866, the Oatman Flat Station reopened, from 1868 to 1877 a new station was built near the old one and was run by William I. Fourr, who improved the route between his station and the stations to the east and west of his and charged a toll for its use. Fourr and his wife lost children that were buried nearby in the Fourr Cemetery. Following the advent of the railroad in Arizona in 1878 the station closed and fell into ruin.

The flat is now farmland that covers the sites of the old stations, but the Oatman Grave and Fourr Cemetery are still to be found.

== See also ==
- Maricopa Wells
- Sacate, Arizona
- Pima Villages
