= Frances Slocum =

Adopted member of the Miami people

Frances Slocum (Maconaquah)
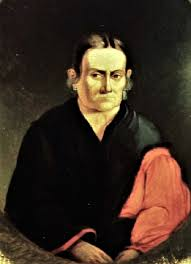
- Frances Slocum (age 66), portrait by George Winter, 1839
- Born: March 4, 1773; Warwick, Rhode Island, U.S.
- Died: March 9, 1847 (aged 74); Miami County, Indiana, U.S.
- Spouse: Shepoconah (Deaf Man)
- Children: two sons, died at a young age two daughters, Kekenakushwa (Cut Finger) (1800–1847) and Ozahshinquah (Yellow Leaf) (ca. 1809–1877)
- Parent(s): Jonathan Slocum (1733–1778); Ruth Tripp Slocum (1736–1807)

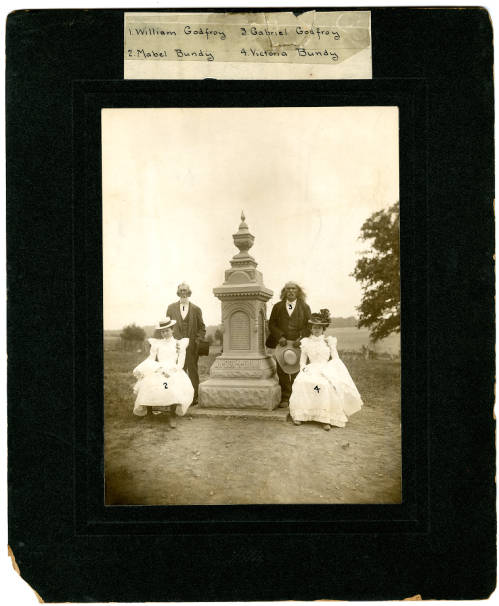
Group at Frances Slocum tomb

Frances Slocum (March 4, 1773 – March 9, 1847) (Ma-con-na-quah, "Young Bear" or "Little Bear") was an adopted member of the Miami people. Slocum was born into a Quaker family that migrated from Warwick, Rhode Island, in 1777 to the Wyoming Valley in Luzerne County, Pennsylvania. On November 2, 1778, when Slocum was five years old, she was captured by three Delaware warriors at the Slocum family farm in Wilkes-Barre, Pennsylvania. Slocum was raised among the Delaware in what is now Ohio and Indiana. With her marriage to Shepoconah (Deaf Man), who later became a Miami chief, Slocum joined the Miami and took the name Maconaquah. She settled with her Miami family at Deaf Man's village along the Mississinewa River near Peru, Indiana.

In 1835 Slocum revealed to a visitor that she was a white woman who had been kidnapped as a child, and two years later, in September 1837, three of Slocum's siblings came to see her. They confirmed that she was their sister, but Slocum chose to stay with her Miami family in Indiana. Slocum fully assimilated into the Native American culture and was accepted as one of its members. On March 3, 1845, the United States Congress passed the joint resolution that exempted Slocum and twenty-one of her Miami relatives from removal to Kansas Territory. Her Miami relations in Indiana were among the 148 individuals who formed the nucleus of the present-day Miami Nation of Indiana. She is buried at Slocum Cemetery in Wabash County, Indiana. Tributes named in her honor include Indiana's Frances Slocum Trail; the Frances Slocum State Recreation Area on the banks of the Mississinewa Lake near Peru, Indiana; Maconaquah High School in Indiana; Frances Slocum Elementary School in Marion, Indiana; Frances Slocum Elementary School, Fort Wayne Indiana; and Frances Slocum State Park in Luzerne County, Pennsylvania and Mocanaqua, Pennsylvania.

== Early life ==
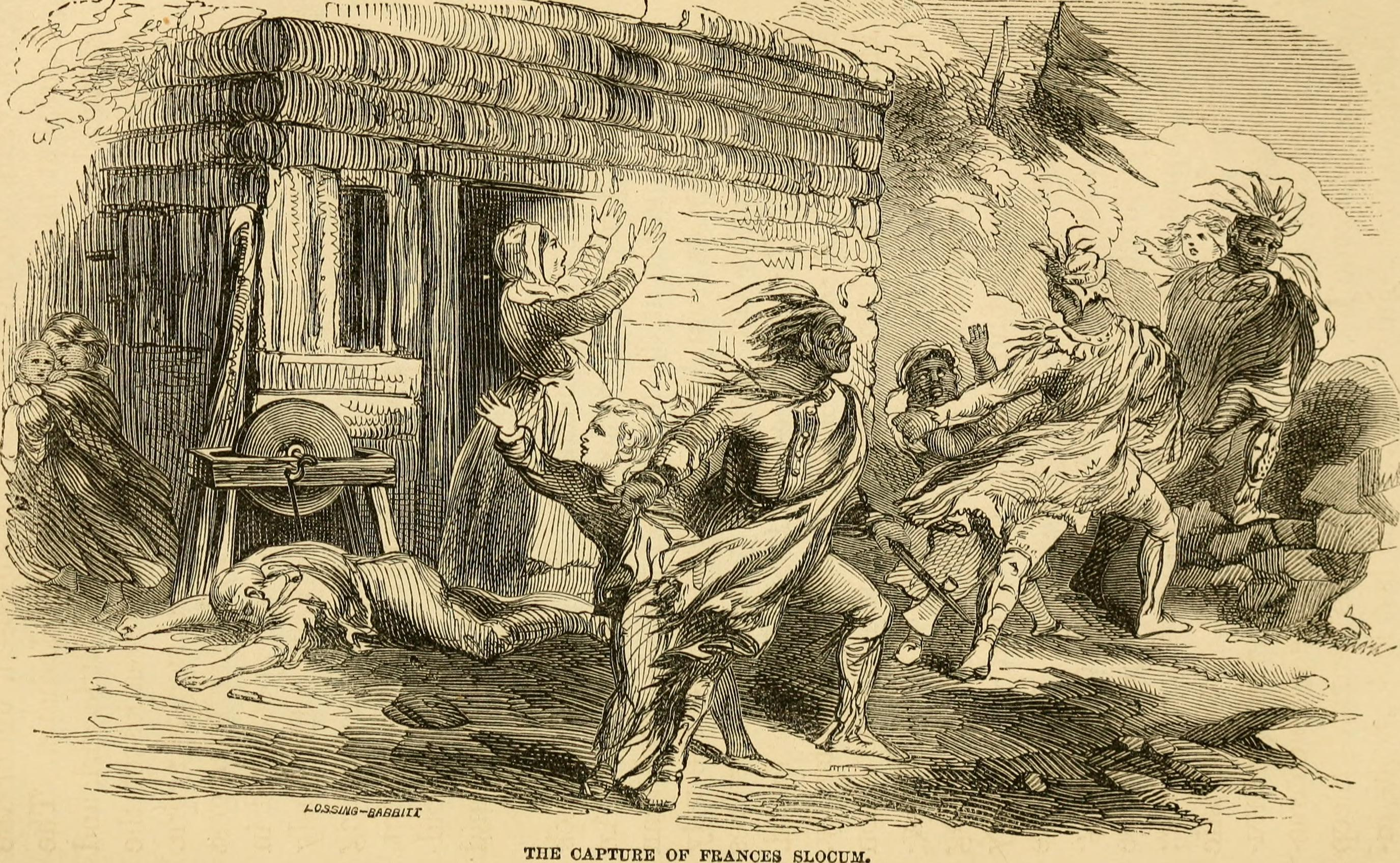
The capture of Frances Slocum

Frances Slocum was one of ten children born to Jonathan and Ruth (Tripp) Slocum. The exact date of Frances's birth is uncertain, but it is believed to have been March 4, 1773. The Slocum family, who were Quakers and pacifists, emigrated from Warwick, Rhode Island, to the Wyoming Valley in Luzerne County, Pennsylvania, in 1777.

Soon after their arrival, violence erupted in eastern Pennsylvania's Susquehanna River valley. Although the Slocum family remained in the settlement, many others fled during the Battle of Wyoming in July 1778, when British forces and Seneca warriors destroyed Forty Fort near Wilkes-Barre, killing more than three hundred American settlers. The Slocum family survived the battle, and felt their Quaker beliefs and friendly relations with the natives would protect them. However, on November 2, 1778, while Jonathan was away, three Delaware warriors attacked the Slocum family farm near Wilkes-Barre. Ruth and all but two of her children escaped into the nearby woods, but the Delaware captured five-year-old Frances, her disabled brother, Ebenezer, and Wareham Kingsley, a young boy whose family was living with the Slocums. Ebenezer was released at the farm, but Frances and the Kingsley boy were taken captive. Slocum never saw her parents again. Natives killed her father and grandfather on December 16, 1778. Slocum's mother, who died on May 6, 1807, never gave up hope that her daughter would be found.

The Delaware gave Slocum to a childless Delaware chief and his wife. They named her Weletasash, after their youngest daughter who had died, and raised her as their own. Not much is known about Slocum's early life among the Delaware. She later recalled that they migrated west through Niagara Falls and Detroit, before settling near Kekionga (the site of present-day Fort Wayne, Indiana).

== Marriage and family ==
Slocum was briefly married to a Delaware sometime around 1791 or 1792. The tradition among the Miami is that he did not treat her well, and due to domestic violence, she returned to her Delaware parents. Her first husband is said to have migrated west with the Delaware tribe.

Slocum's second marriage, sometime after 1794, was to Shepoconah, known as Deaf Man to the white men because of his deafness. Shepoconah was a Miami warrior who later became a Miami chief. She first encountered him while traveling through the forest, finding him badly-wounded. With the assistance of her Delaware parents, she brought him to their village, where he stayed at their home and regained his health. Frances eventually married him. The couple had four children: two sons, who died at a young age, and two daughters, Kekenakushwa (Cut Finger) and Ozahshinquah (Yellow Leaf), who both survived to adulthood. When Frances joined the Miami she took the name Maconaquah (Little Bear).

Sometime after the War of 1812 the Miami tribe, which included Shepoconah and Maconaquah (Slocum), moved to the Mississinewa River valley in north central Indiana. Little more is known about Slocum's life among the natives. Most of the available information focuses on her later years after she was reunited with her white relatives near Peru, Indiana, in 1837.

== Later years ==
=== Discovery ===
Since her capture Slocum's white relatives continued to search for her without success. They did not see her for fifty-nine years. In 1835 Colonel George Ewing, an Indian trader who did business with the Miami and spoke their language fluently, stopped for the night at a log cabin in a small Indiana settlement known as Deaf Man's village along the Mississinewa River, near Peru, Indiana. During his stay he spoke with an elderly Miami woman who revealed that she was by birth a white woman and explained how she had been kidnapped as a child. She spoke no English, but remembered her white family's name was Slocum and they had been Quakers who lived along the Susquehanna River.

Ewing believed that Slocum wanted to reveal her identity, a secret she had kept for more than fifty years, because she was in poor health and thought she might die soon. Although some have suggested that Slocum feared she would be forcibly removed from the Miami if her past was known, others have argued it is more likely that she decided to reveal her white identity to save her Miami village from forced removal to the Kansas Territory. Or, she simply may have wanted to remain with her daughters in Indiana during her final years.

When Ewing met Slocum she was a widow living with her extended family at Deaf Man's village. The small enclave consisted of a double log cabin with two or three cabins attached to it, a corn crib, a stable, and outbuildings for livestock. Living with her were her two daughters, Ozahshinquah (Yellow Leaf), a young widow, and Kekenakushwa (Cut Finger), Slocum's elder daughter; Kekenakushwa's husband, Tanquakeh, a métis named Jean Baptiste Brouillette; three grandchildren; and an elderly relative.

Deaf Man's village was a cross-cultural meeting place and Slocum's diverse family was not unique. An African-American laborer who had assimilated and married into the Miami tribe lived in a nearby cabin. Although the village was a mix of European and Indian culture because of the influential fur trade, Slocum was thoroughly assimilated into the Miami culture and was a member of the Miami tribe. The inhabitants of the village, including Slocum, did not speak English and were not Christian. They practiced pluralism, and continued traditions and ceremonies that remained unchanged from the previous century.

=== Reunion with white relatives ===
After Ewing found Slocum he tried to locate her white relatives. In 1835 he sent a letter to the postmaster at Lancaster, Pennsylvania, asking if the Slocum family had a relative that was captured by natives about the time of the American Revolutionary War, but the letter was misplaced. It was discovered two years later and a notice was published in an extra edition of the Lancaster Intelligencer, where it caught the attention of a minister in the Wyoming Valley. He was aware of the Slocum family's search for their sister, and forwarded the newspaper notice to her brother, Joseph Slocum. Ewing received word from Joseph, and in September 1837 two of Slocum's brothers, Isaac and Joseph, and her older sister, Mary Slocum Towne, journeyed with interpreters to Deaf Man's village in the Mississinewa River valley to find out if she was their lost sister. By that time Slocum was an elderly widow who had lived among the natives for nearly 60 years. Frances, her two daughters, and a son-in-law also visited the Slocums while they were staying in Peru.

Slocum's siblings were thrilled to see their sister, but they were shocked by her transformation. She spoke no English and did not remember her Christian name was Frances. Slocum communicated through an interpreter and only responded to direct questions. Some researchers have suggested that this could be a cultural trait the white visitors did not understand, or Slocum may have been afraid she would be forced to leave her Miami family and go live with the Slocums. During their visits the Slocum family confirmed that she was their lost sister from the information she provided, and especially after recognizing the disfigured forefinger on her left hand, which was the result of a childhood accident prior to her capture. The Slocum siblings tried to convince her to return with them to Pennsylvania, but she refused to leave her native family. Slocum explained that she preferred to remain with the Miami, and if she returned to her birthplace she would be "like a fish out of water." In September 1839 Joseph Slocum and two of his daughters, Hannah and Harriet, paid another visit to Deaf Man's Village. Slocum still refused to leave her Miami family, but she did agree to the Slocum family's request to have her portrait painted.

=== Avoiding removal to Indian territory ===
Treaties signed with the Miami in 1838 and 1840 forced Slocum's Miami community to consider removal from Indiana to Kansas Territory. In these treaties the Miami ceded all but a small portion of their remaining tribal lands in Indiana to the federal government, and in 1840 they also agreed to move west of the Mississippi River within five years.

A treaty made in November 1838, three years after Slocum revealed her identity, provided some Miami families with individual land grants that would allow them to remain in Indiana. Among the recipients were Ozahshinquah and Kekenakushwa (Shepoconah's and Slocum's two daughters), who jointly received 640 acres of land. This land allotment exempted them from removal to Kansas Territory. Slocum, who was living with her daughters and was recognized as the head of the family, was not named as a land grant recipient.

After it became public knowledge that Slocum was white, her presence encouraged the community at Deaf Man's village to construct itself as white and mask their Indian identity. This strategy, combined with political maneuvering, helped tribal leaders (namely Miami chief Francis Godfroy) gain enough support to delay the removal process for several years, and in some situations exempting some members of the community from removal to reservation lands west of the Mississippi River.

Slocum appealed to her white brothers, Joseph and Isaac Slocum, for help with her petition to United States Congress for exemption from removal. To gain sympathy from members of Congress, Slocum's lawyer, Alphonzo Cole, of Peru, Indiana, portrayed her as an old woman who had endured years of hardship and captivity and only wished to remain near her family—both white and Indian. U.S. Congressman Benjamin Bidlack of Pennsylvania, who introduced the House resolution was sympathetic to her cause and stressed the importance of Slocum staying close to her white relatives, although she had met only a few of them. On March 3, 1845, Congress passed a joint resolution that exempted Slocum and 21 members of her Miami village from removal to reservation lands in the Kansas Territory. Slocum received a land grant of 620 acres (one section) of land in Indiana. With congressional approval of her petition, Slocum and the members of her Miami village were able to continue living on their land in Indiana. They were among the 148 individuals who formed the nucleus of the present-day Miami Nation of Indiana.

The Miami's remaining reservation land in Indiana was ceded to the federal government in 1846. On October 6, 1846, less than six months before Slocum's death, a major removal of more than 300 Miami began at Peru, and a smaller group removed in 1847. In all, less than one half the Miami tribe were removed, and more than one half either returned to Indiana or were never required to leave under the terms of the treaties.

== George Winter's influence ==
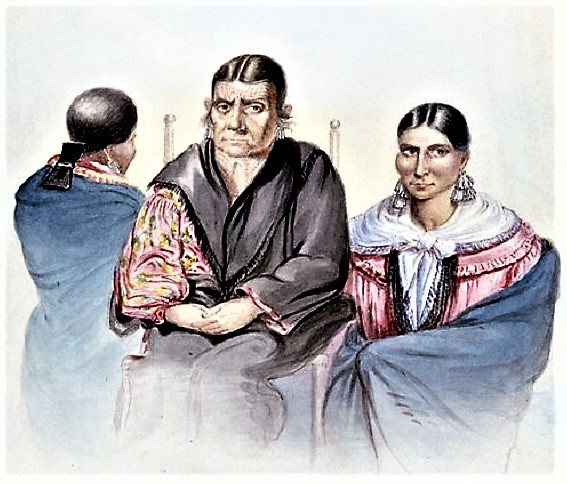
Frances Slocum and her daughters

The Slocum family commissioned English artist George Winter to paint a portrait of their sister. Winter, who was among the first professional artists to live and work in Indiana, came to Logansport, in 1837 to document the Indian removals in Indiana. In antebellum America, when most Americans viewed Indians as uncivilized, the ethnographic content of Winter's drawings "with few exceptions", provided an honest and reliable record of specific aspects of the Miami and Potawatomi culture from one of the few Euro-American artists working in northern Indiana. Winter sketched and wrote many descriptions of Potawatomi and the Miami people in his journals, which also included drawings and details of Deaf Man's village, Slocum, and her Miami family. The extensive number of his surviving works and his detailed documentation are noted as reliable primary sources for historical studies of the Native American tribes of Indiana's Wabash Valley.

According to Winter's journal, his pencil sketch of Slocum in her cabin at Deaf Man's Village in 1839 is the only one of her executed from life. "The Captive Sister" portrait of Slocum, also known as the "Lost Sister of Wyoming", became his best-known work, especially after the news spread that she had been found and her story became famous. He charged $75 for the commissioned painting. The description of Slocum that Winter wrote in his journal closely fits his original sketch:

Though bearing some resemblance to her family (white), yet her cheekbones seemed to have the Indian characteristics—face broad, nose bulby, mouth indicating some degree of severity, her eyes pleasant and kind.

He estimated her height at about five feet tall. He also noted the deep lines on her face and her hair, "originally of a dark brown, was now frosted." Winter's journal also provides a description of her attire, which included a red calico shirt with yellow and green figures, a black cloth petticoat bordered with red ribbon, faded red leggings with green ribbons, and a black silk shawl. She was barefoot and wore little jewelry, with the exception of earrings.

During the sitting for her portrait Winter communicated with her through the African American interpreter who was living at Deaf Man's village. Winter described his presence in the village: "I could but feel as by intuition, that my absence would be hailed as a joyous relief to the family." Winter showed her Miami family his sketch and later noted that Slocum "looked upon her likeness with complacency," Kekenakushwa, her elder daughter, "eyed it approvingly, yet suspiciously," and her younger daughter, Ozahshinquah, refused to look, "as though something evil surrounded it."

In addition to the portrait for the Slocum family, Winter sketched another version. The two are significantly different. In the formal oil portrait for the Slocum family, she is somber, her skin appears lighter, and her clothes are not as vibrant or detailed. In the other version, which included Slocum and her two daughters, her deeply lined face appears darker skinned and her clothing is more colorful and detailed. Her daughter Ozahshinquah, who refused to look at Winter's original sketch, appears on the left with her back to the artist, a common native practice.

== Death and legacy ==
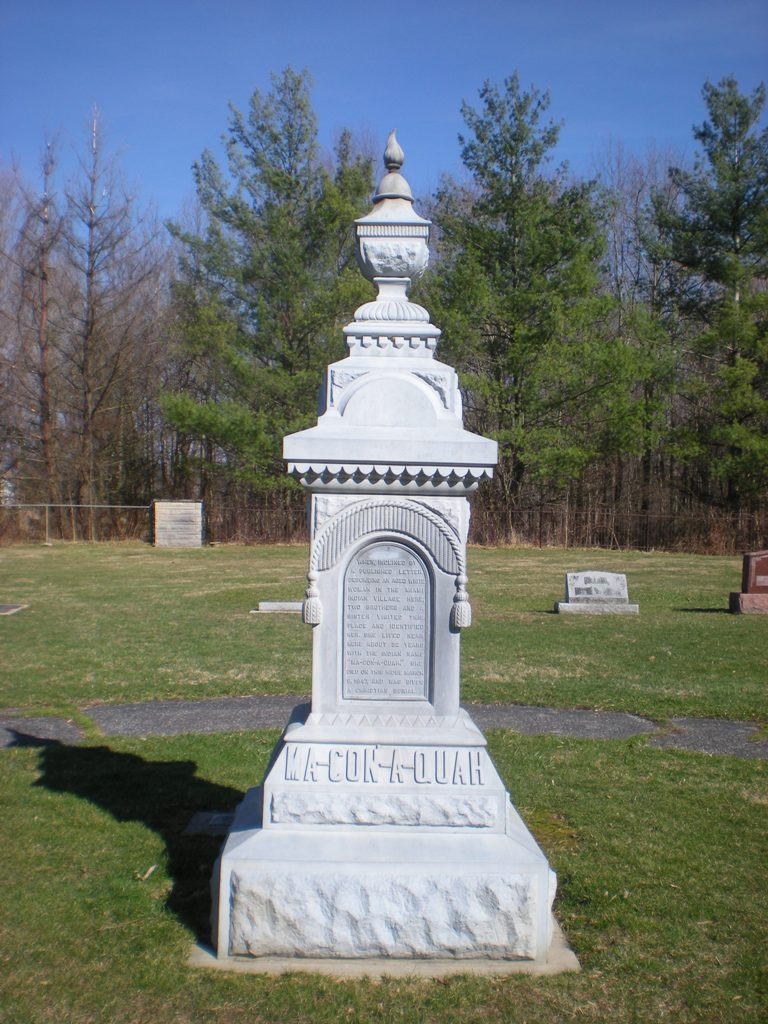
Frances Slocum's Grave, Wabash, Indiana

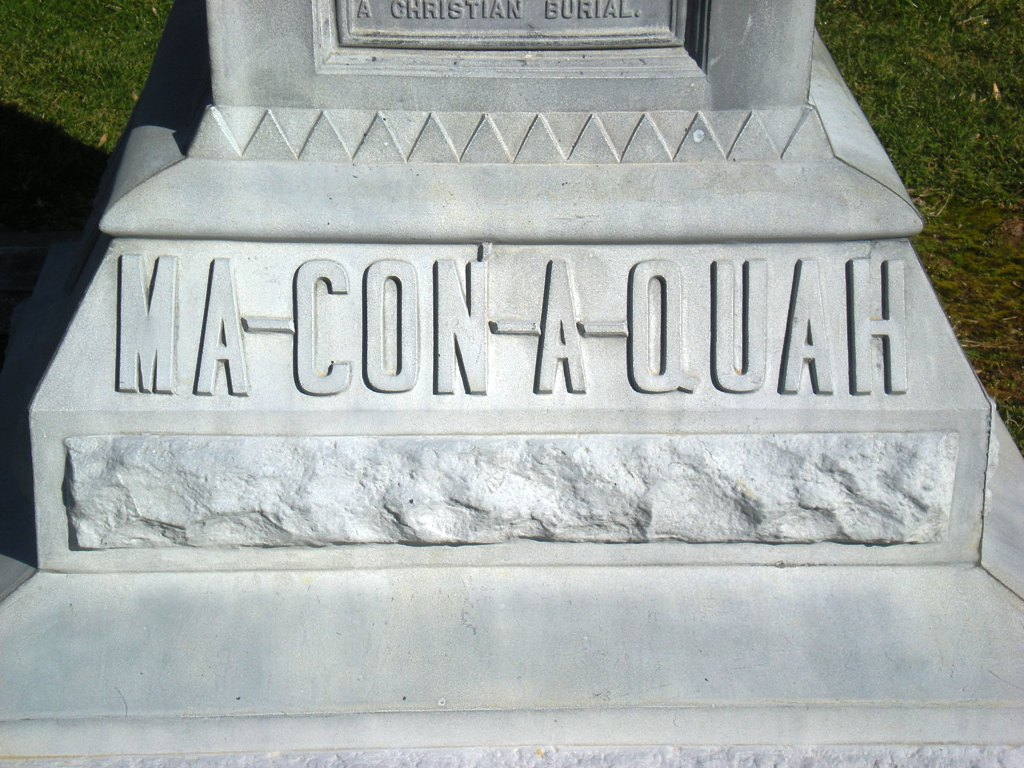
Frances Slocum's Grave

On March 9, 1847, Frances Slocum died of pneumonia at Deaf Man's village along the Mississinewa River in Indiana. She was 74 years old. Slocum was initially buried near her cabin at Deaf Man's village, beside her second husband, She-pan-can-ah (Deaf Man) and two sons. In 1965 the graves were moved to Slocum Cemetery, near Mississinewa Lake in Wabash County, Indiana, when construction of the Mississinewa River dam would flood the site of Deaf Man's village.

Slocum's story is one of an individual who was forcibly kidnapped and made to fully assimilate into the Native American culture that surrounded her, and was accepted as one of its members. Few details beyond her life in Pennsylvania with the Slocum family and her later years after reuniting with her white relatives have been recorded. Little is known of her life among the Miami. Perhaps this is because she told so little of her life to whites. As a result, Slocum and the other inhabitants of Deaf Man's village are largely absent from the historical sources. Most glimpses of Slocum's Miami community come from outsiders such as George Winter, whose paintings and journals helped to further document aspects of their lives and the Miami culture in general. An oral history of the Miami, written down in the 1960s as told by Miami chief Clarence Godfroy, Slocum's great-great-grandson, describes a woman revered by the Miami community, especially after her second husband's death. Members of the community often went to her for counsel. She also enjoyed breaking ponies and playing games right alongside the men. While this behavior would have been shocking to American pioneers, it was not uncommon for women to have these roles within the Miami tribe.

== Honors and tributes ==
On May 6, 1900, Slocum's descendants, both white and native, raised a monument at her gravesite in Wabash County, Indiana. The zinc marker with an extensive epitaph is a tribute to her life as Maconaquah and Frances Slocum, as well as to her second husband, She-pan-can-ah (Deaf Man), who is commemorated on one side of the monument. In 1967 a state historical marker was erected at the entrance to the Slocum Cemetery in Wabash County, Indiana.

Other tributes named after her include a 30-mile long Frances Slocum Trail from Peru to Marion, Indiana; the Frances Slocum State Forest, a recreational area near Peru, Indiana; and Frances Slocum State Park in Luzerne County, Pennsylvania.

A George Winter watercolor study of Frances Slocum and her two daughters and an oil portrait of Frances Slocum are part of the Tippecanoe County Historical Association's collections.

== See also ==
- Indian removals in Indiana
- Mary Jemison
- Herman Lehmann
- Olive Oatman
- Mary Ann Oatman
