= Olive Oatman =

American woman once enslaved (1837–1903)

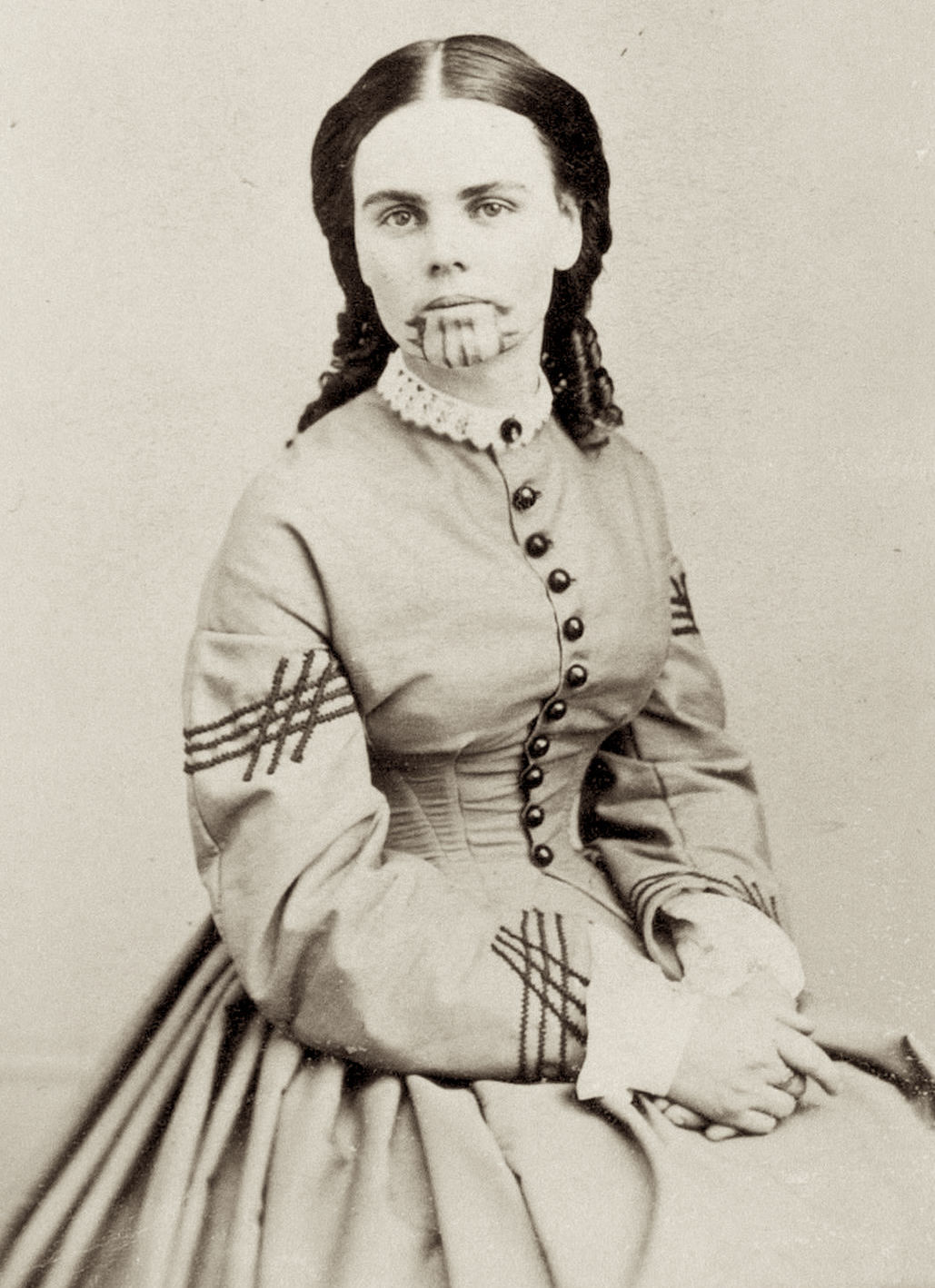
- Olive Oatman c. 1863
- Born: Olive Ann Oatman; September 7, 1837; La Harpe, Illinois, U.S.
- Died: March 21, 1903 (aged 65); Sherman, Texas, U.S.
- Resting place: West Hill Cemetery
- Other names: Olive Oatman Fairchild, Oach
- Education: University of the Pacific
- Spouse: John Brant Fairchild (m. 1865)
- Children: Mary Elizabeth Fairchild (adopted)
- Relatives: Mary Ann Oatman (sister)

Olive Ann Oatman (September 7, 1837 – March 21, 1903) was a white American woman who was enslaved and later released by Indians in the Mojave Desert region when she was a teenager. She later lectured about her experiences.

On February 18, 1851, at dusk with a full moon rising, while emigrating from Illinois to the confluence of the Colorado River and the Gila River (in modern-day Yuma, Arizona), her family was attacked by a small group from an Indian tribe. Though she identified them as Apache, they were most likely Tolkepayas (Western Yavapai). They killed her parents and four siblings, left her older brother Lorenzo Dow Oatman (1836–1901) for dead, and enslaved Olive and her younger sister Mary Ann, holding them as slaves for one year before they traded them to the Mohave people. While Lorenzo exhaustively attempted to recruit governmental help in searching for them, Mary Ann died from starvation and Olive spent four years with the Mohave.

Five years after the attack, she was returned into American society. The story of the Oatman Massacre began to be retold with dramatic license in the press, as well as in her own memoir and speeches. Novels, plays, movies, and poetry were inspired, which resonated in the media of the time and long afterward. She had become an oddity in 1860s America, partly because of the prominent blue tattooing of her chin by the Mohave, making her the first known white woman with Indian tattoos. Much of what actually occurred during her time with the Indians remains unknown.

== Early life ==
Olive was born the third of seven children to Royce Boise Oatman (1809–1851) and Mary Ann Sperry Oatman (1813–1851) in La Harpe, Hancock County, Illinois. In 1839, her parents left the Methodist church and joined The Church of Jesus Christ of Latter-day Saints (Mormons) under the leadership of Joseph Smith. After Smith was killed in June 1844, the Oatmans chose to affiliate with the Mormon splinter group called the Brewsterites (which was founded in 1848 by James C. Brewster) instead of staying with the main body of Mormons under the leadership of Brigham Young.

On August 5, 1850, the Brewsterites (including the Oatmans) left their encampment near Independence, Missouri as a wagon train with 93 people and 24 wagons headed to the confluence of the Colorado River and the Gila River in modern-day Yuma, Arizona. There, Brewster claimed was the "intended place of gathering" for The Church of Christ followers. Dissension caused the group to split near Santa Fe in New Mexico Territory with Brewster following the northern route. Royce Oatman and several other families chose the southern route via Socorro and Tucson. Near Socorro, Royce Oatman assumed command of the party. They reached New Mexico Territory early in 1851 only to find the country and climate wholly unsuited to their purpose. The other wagons gradually abandoned the goal of reaching the Colorado River.

When the party reached Maricopa Wells (20 miles south of modern-day Phoenix, Arizona), they were told that the Gila Trail (Southern Emigration Route) to the west was barren, dangerous, and frequented by hostile Native Americans. They were warned that they would risk their lives if they proceeded further. While the other families resolved to stay in Maricopa Wells, the Oatmans chose to continue their westward journey.

== The Oatman Massacre ==
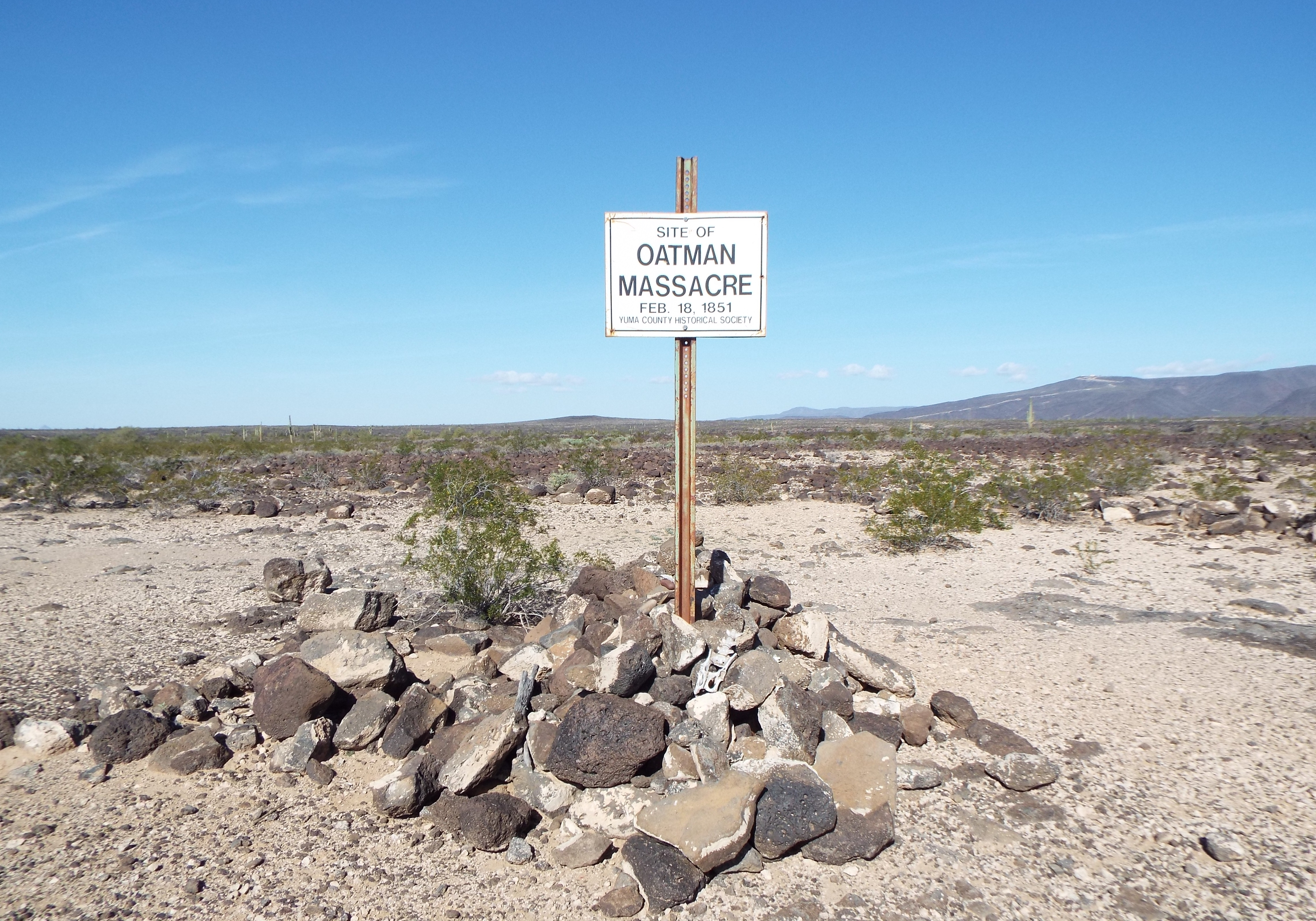
The Oatman Family Massacre site.

The Oatman family, traveling alone, was nearly annihilated in what became known as the "Oatman Massacre" on the banks of the Gila River 84 miles east of modern-day Yuma, Arizona. The seven Oatman children ranged in age from one to 17 years old, the eldest being Lucy Oatman. Mary Ann was 8 months pregnant with their eighth child. On the Oatmans' fourth day out from Maricopa Wells, they were approached by a group of nineteen Native Americans who were asking for tobacco and food. Due to the lack of supplies, Royce Oatman was hesitant to share too much with the small party of Yavapais. They became irate at his stinginess. During the encounter, the Yavapais attacked the Oatman family. The Yavapais clubbed the family to death. All were killed except for three of the children: 15-year-old Lorenzo, who was left for dead, while 14-year-old Olive and 7-year-old Mary Ann were taken to be slaves for the Yavapais.

After the attack, Lorenzo regained consciousness to find his parents and siblings dead, but he saw no sign of little Mary Ann or Olive. Lorenzo attempted the hazardous trek to find help. He eventually reached a settlement, where his wounds were treated. Lorenzo rejoined the emigrant train, and three days later returned to the bodies of his slain family. In a detailed retelling which was reprinted in newspapers over the decades, he said, "We buried the bodies of father, mother and babe in one common grave." The men had no way of digging proper graves in the volcanic rocky soil, so they gathered the bodies together and formed a cairn over them. It has been said the remains were reburied several times and finally moved to the river for re-interment by early Arizona pioneer Charles Poston. Lorenzo Oatman became determined to never give up the search for his only surviving siblings.

== Captivity and conversion ==
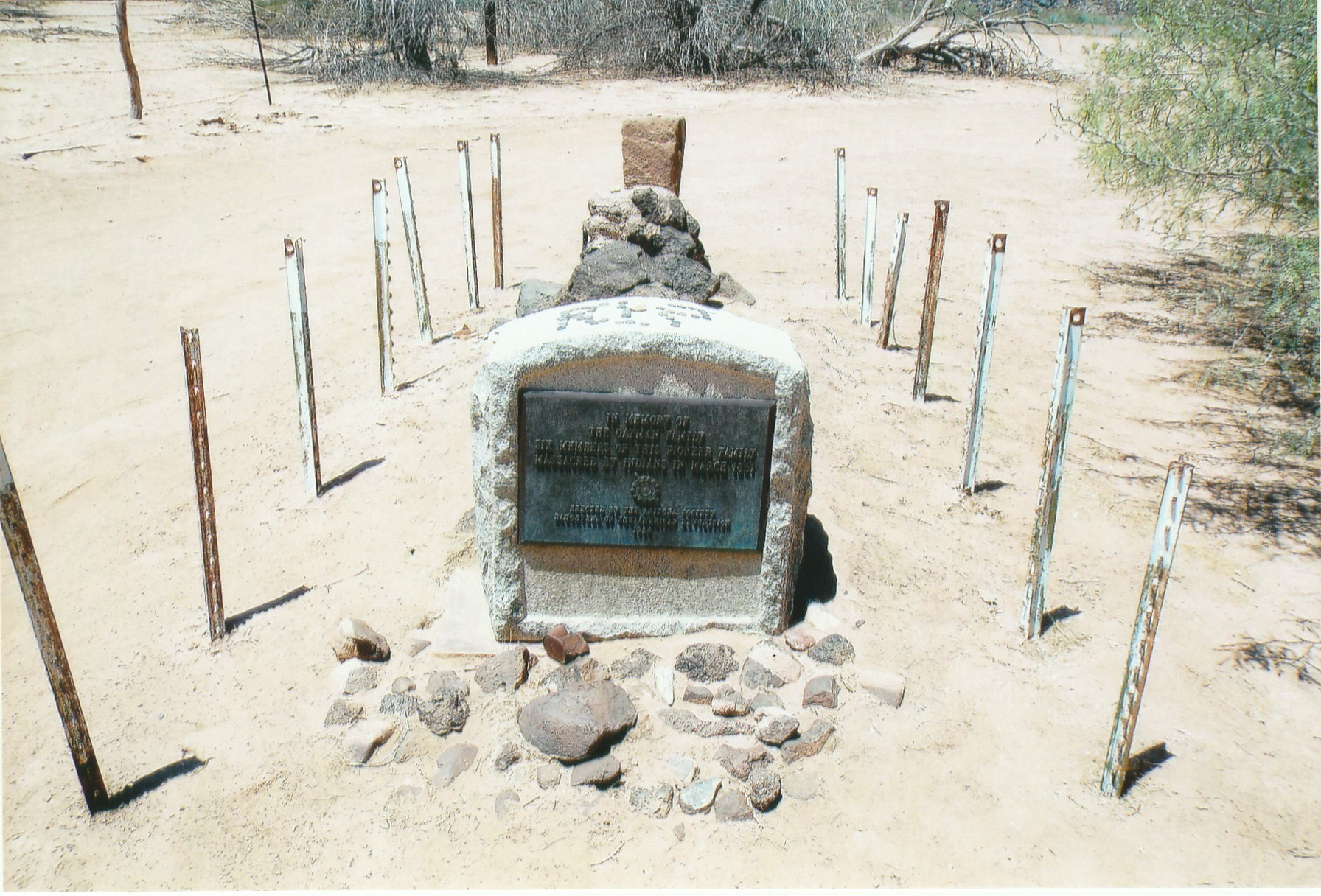
The Oatman Family grave.

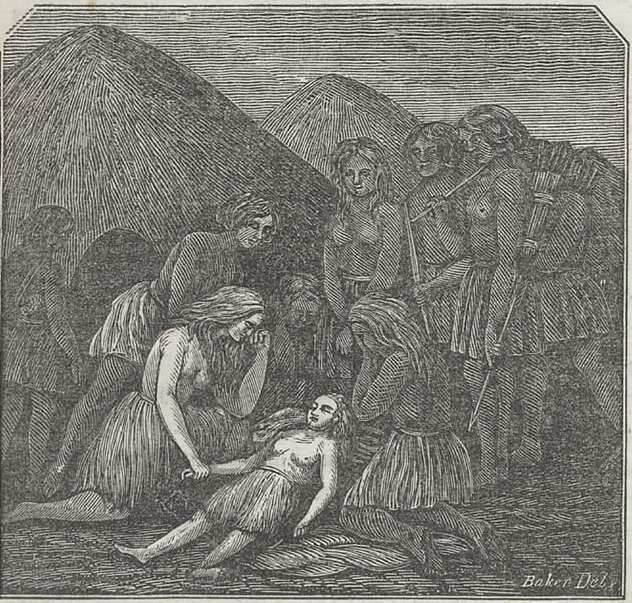
Death of Mary Ann Oatman

After the attack, the Native Americans took some of the Oatman family's belongings, along with Olive and Mary Ann. Although Olive Oatman later identified her captors as members of the Tonto Apache tribe, they were probably of the Tolkepaya tribe (Western Yavapais) living in a village eight miles (13 km) southwest of Aguila, Arizona, in the Harquahala Mountains. After arriving at the village, the girls were initially treated in a way that appeared threatening, and Oatman later said she thought they would be killed. However, the girls were used as slaves to forage for food, to lug water and firewood, and for other menial tasks.

During the girls' captivity with the Yavapais, another group of Native Americans came to trade with the tribe. This group was made up of Mohave Native Americans. The daughter of the Mohave Chief Espaniole saw the girls and their poor treatment during a trading expedition. She tried to make a trade for the girls. The Yavapais refused, but the chief's daughter, Topeka, was persistent and returned once more offering a trade for the girls. Eventually the Yavapais gave in and traded the girls for two horses, some vegetables, blankets, and beads. After being taken into Mohave custody, the girls walked for days to a Mohave village along the Colorado River (in the center of what today is Needles, California). They were immediately taken in by the family of a tribal leader (kohot) whose non-Mohave name was Espaniole. The Mohave tribe was more prosperous than the group that had held the girls captive, and both Espaniole's wife, Aespaneo, and daughter, Topeka, took an interest in the Oatman girls' welfare. Oatman expressed her deep affection for these two women numerous times over the years after her captivity.

Aespaneo arranged for the Oatman girls to be given plots of land to farm. A Mohave tribesman, Llewelyn Barrackman, said in an interview that Olive was most likely fully adopted into the tribe because she was given a Mohave nickname, something only presented to those who have fully assimilated into the tribe. Olive herself would later claim that she and Mary Ann were held captive by the Mohave and that she feared to leave, but this statement could have been colored by the Reverend Royal Byron Stratton, who sponsored the publication of Olive's captivity narrative shortly after her return to White society. For example, Olive did not attempt to contact a large group of whites that visited the Mohaves during her period with them, and years later she went to meet with a Mohave leader, Irataba, in New York City and spoke with him of old times.

Anthropologist Alfred L. Kroeber wrote in an article about the Oatman captivity: "The Mohaves always told her she could go to the white settlements when she pleased but they dared not go with her, fearing they might be punished for having kept a white woman so long among them, nor did they dare to let it be known that she was among them".

Another thing that suggests Olive and Mary Ann were not held in forced captivity by the Mohave is that both girls were tattooed on their chins and arms, in keeping with the tribal custom. Oatman later claimed (in Stratton's book and in her lectures) that she was tattooed to mark her as a slave, but this is not consistent with the Mohave tradition, where such marks were given only to their own people to ensure that they would enter the land of the dead and be recognized there by their ancestors as members of the Mohave tribe. The tribe did not care if their slaves could reach the land of the dead, however, so they did not tattoo them. It has also been suggested that the evenness of Olive's facial markings may indicate her compliance with the procedure.

Olive Oatman's 1860s lecture notes tell of her younger sister often yearning to join that better "world" where their "Father and Mother" had gone. Mary Ann died of starvation while the girls were living with the Mohave. This happened in about 1855–56, when Mary Ann was ten or eleven. It has been claimed that there was a drought in the region, and that the tribe experienced a dire shortage of food supplies, and Olive herself would have died had not Aespaneo, the matriarch of the tribe, saved her life by making a gruel to sustain her.

Olive later spoke with fondness of the Mohaves, who she said treated her better than her first captors. She most likely considered herself assimilated. She was given a clan name, Oach, and a nickname, Spantsa, a Mohave word having to do with unquenchable lust or thirst. She chose not to reveal herself to white railroad surveyors who spent nearly a week in the Mohave Valley trading and socializing with the tribe in February 1854. Because she did not know that Lorenzo had survived the massacre, she believed she had no immediate family, and the Mohave treated her as one of their own.

== Release ==
When Oatman was 19 years old, Francisco, a Yuma Indian messenger, arrived at the village with a message from the authorities at Fort Yuma. Rumors suggested that a white girl was living with the Mohaves, and the post commander requested her return, or to know the reason why she did not choose to return. The Mohaves initially sequestered Oatman and resisted the request. At first they denied that Oatman was even white. Over the course of negotiations, some expressed their affection for Oatman, others their fear of reprisal from whites. Francisco, meanwhile, withdrew to the homes of other nearby Mohaves; shortly thereafter, he made a second attempt to persuade the Mohaves to part with Oatman. Trade items were included this time, including blankets and a white horse, and he passed on threats that the whites would destroy the Mohaves if they did not release Oatman.

After some discussion, in which Oatman was this time included, the Mohaves decided to accept these terms, and Oatman was escorted to Fort Yuma in a 20-day journey. Topeka (the daughter of Espianola/Espanesay and Aespaneo) went on the journey with her. Before entering the fort, Oatman was given Western clothing lent by the wife of an army officer, as she was clad in a traditional Mohave skirt with no covering above her waist. Inside the fort, Oatman was surrounded by cheering people.

Oatman's childhood friend Susan Thompson, whom she befriended again at this time, stated many years later that she believed Oatman was "grieving" upon her forced return because she had been married to a Mohave man and had given birth to two boys. Oatman, however, denied rumors during her lifetime that she either had been married to a Mohave or had been sexually mistreated by the Yavapai or Mohave. In Stratton's book, she declared that "to the honor of these savages, let it be said, they never offered the least unchaste abuse to me." However, her nickname, Spantsa, may have meant "rotten womb" and implied that she was sexually active, although historians have argued that the name could have different meanings.

Within a few days of her arrival at the fort, Oatman discovered that her brother Lorenzo was alive and had been looking for her and Mary Ann. Their meeting made headline news across the West.

== Gallery ==
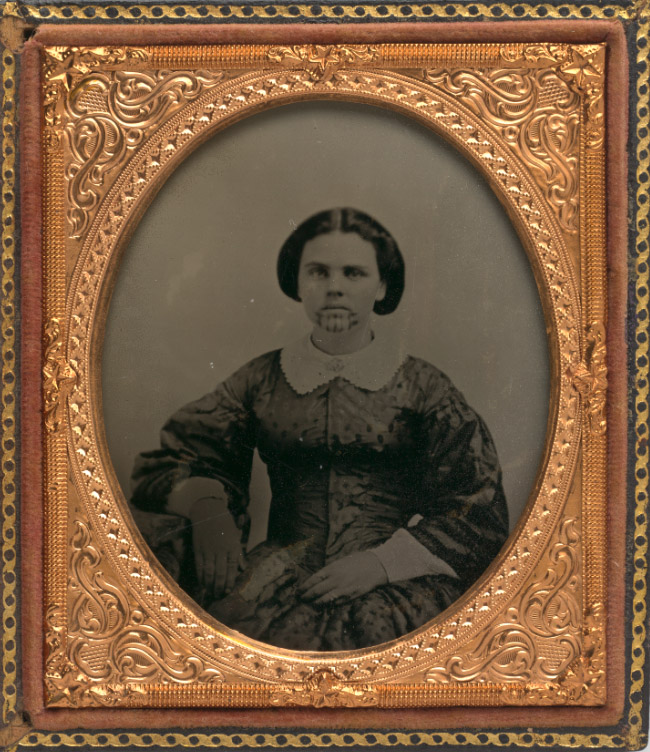
Olive Oatman, ambrotype, c. 1856

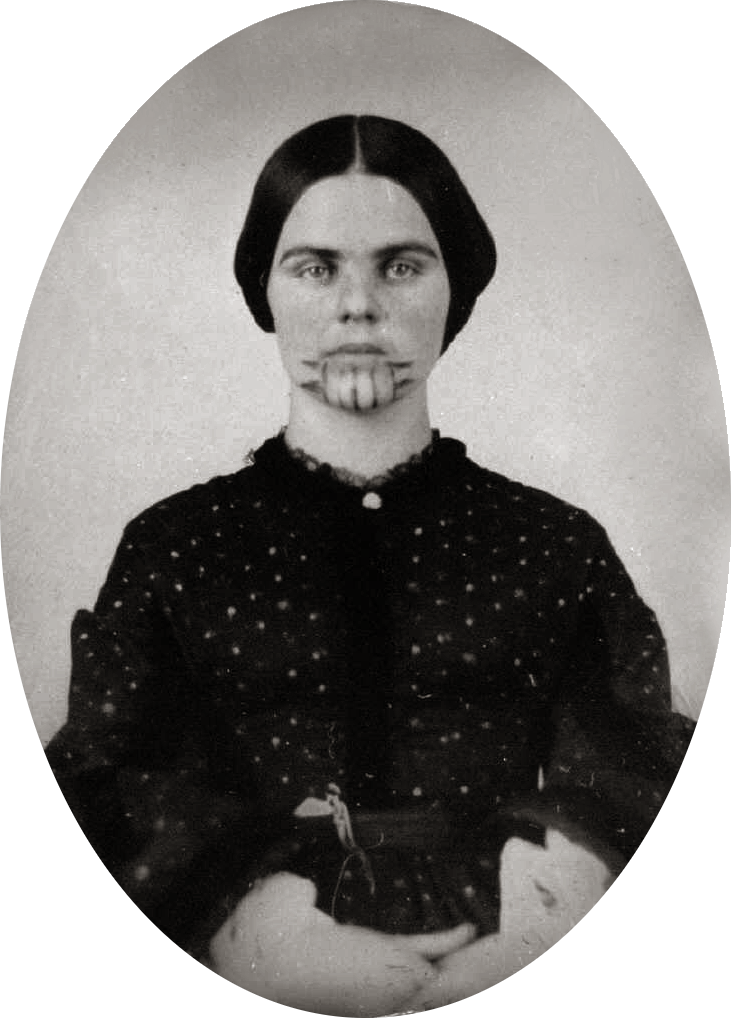
Olive Oatman, tintype, 1857

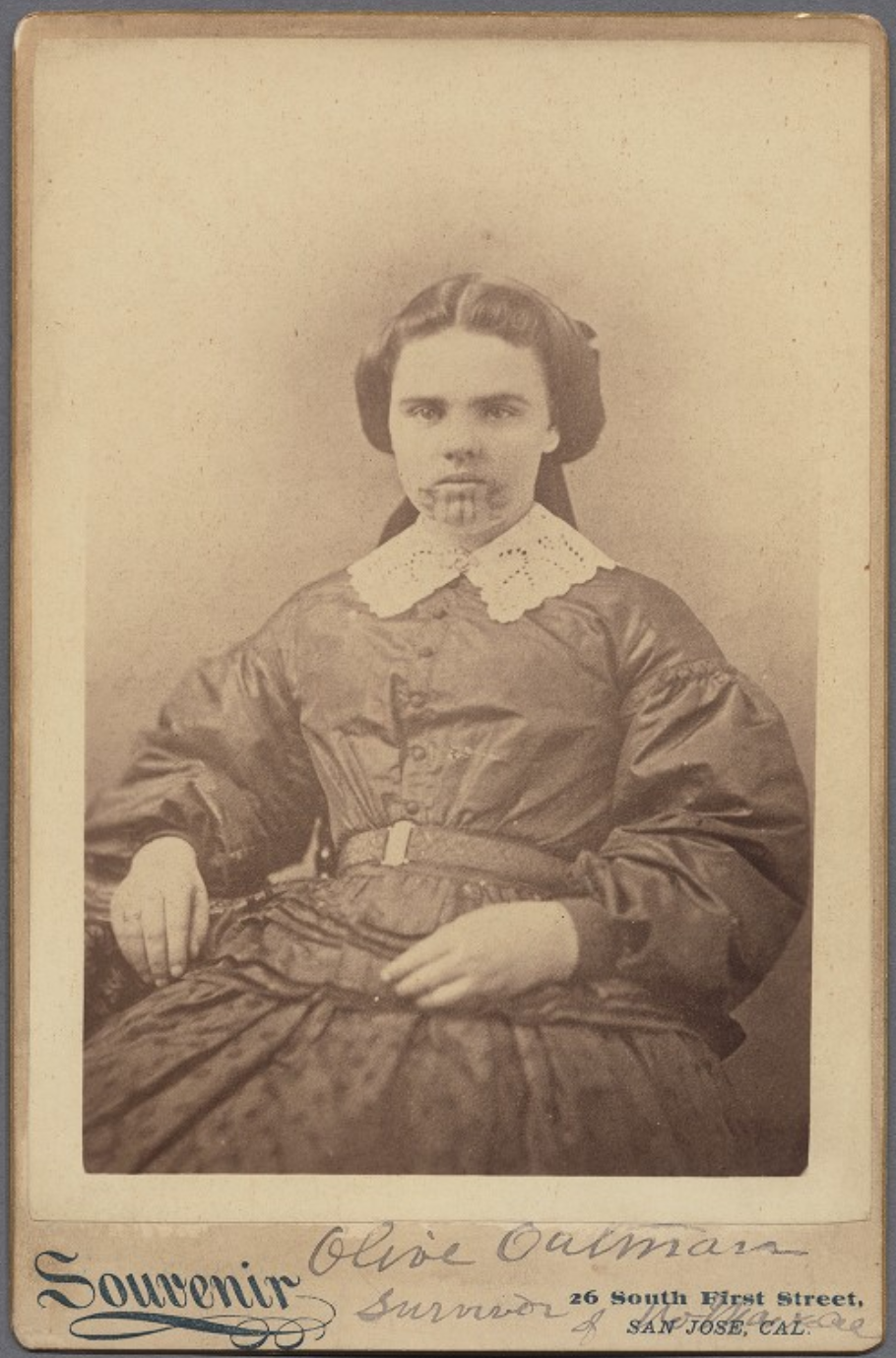
Olive Oatman, Souvenir, San Jose, California c. 1860

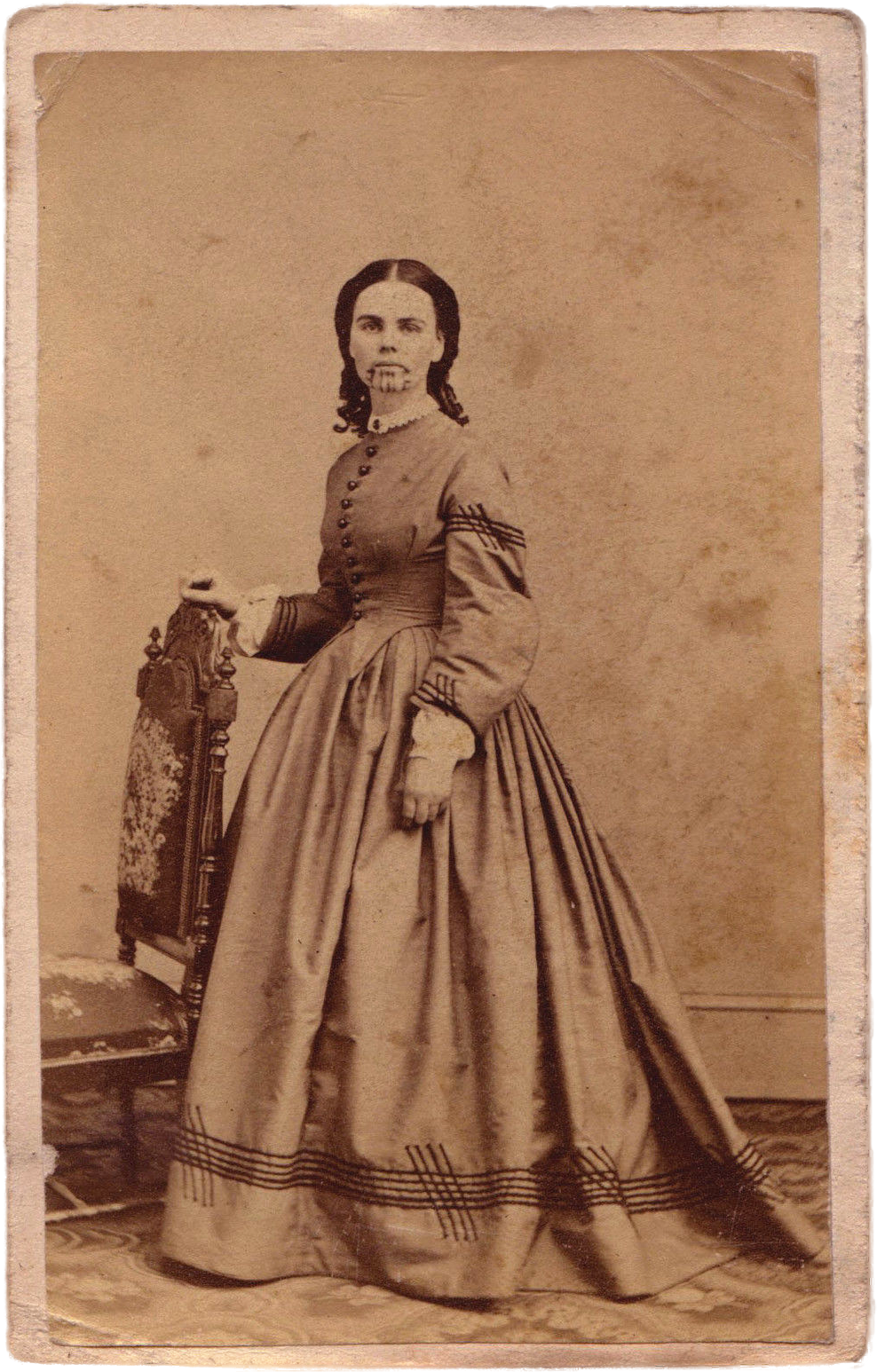
Olive Oatman, carte de visite, Rochester, NY c. 1863

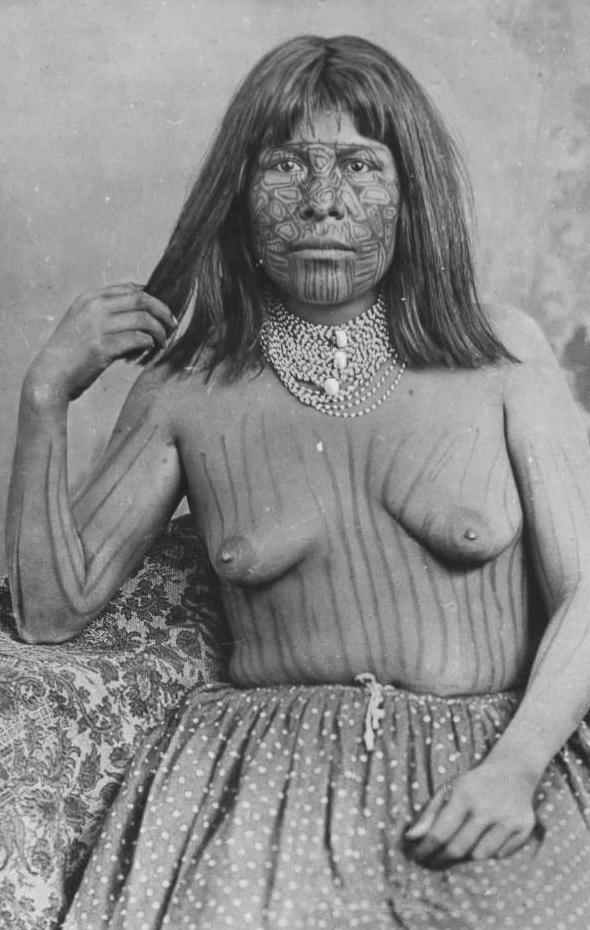
Mohave woman with tattoos, 1883

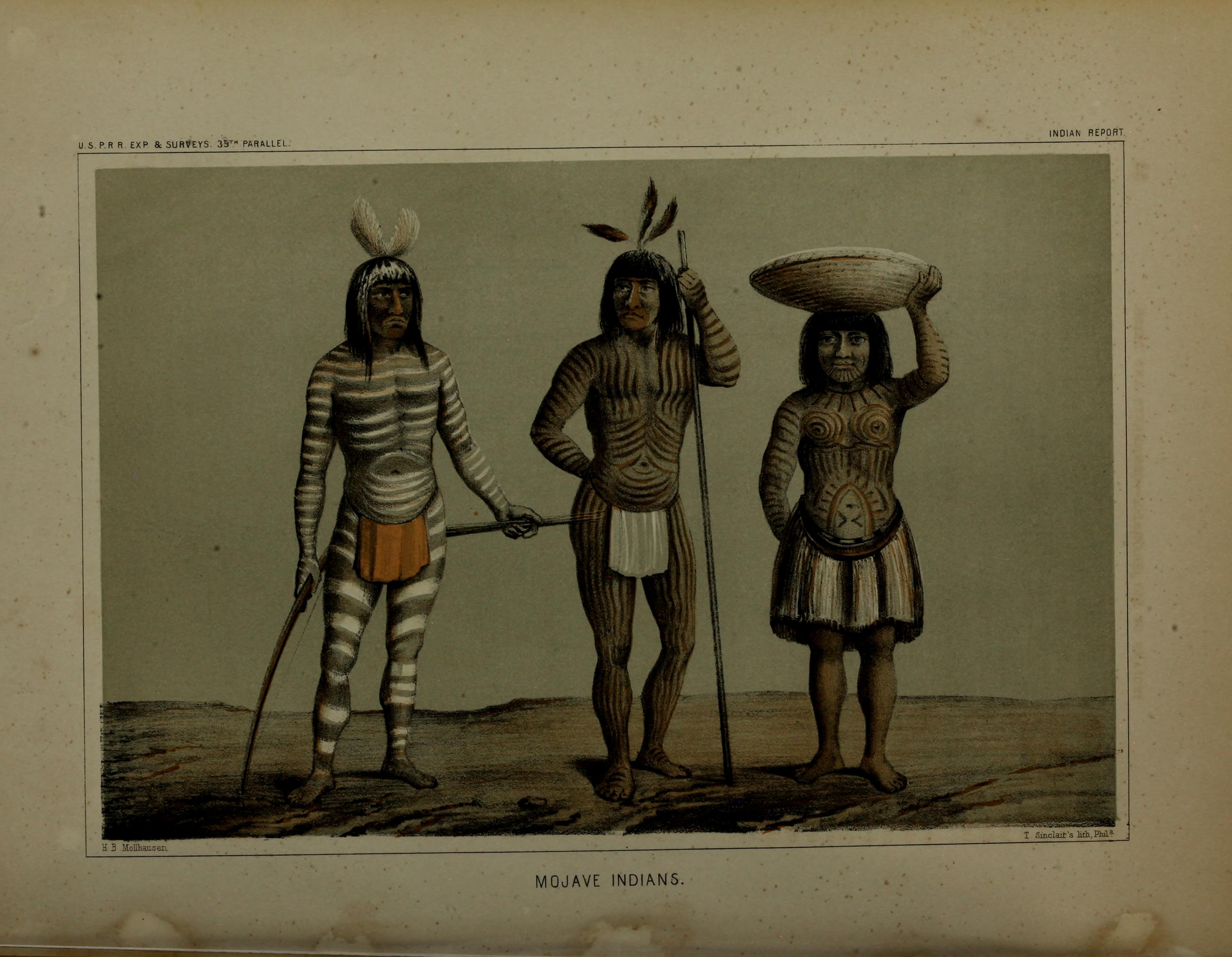
Mojave Indians, 1855. Mollhausen, H. B., artist; Sinclair, Thomas S., lithographer;

== Later life ==
In 1857, a pastor named Royal Byron Stratton sought out Olive and Lorenzo Oatman. He co-wrote a book about the Oatman Massacre and the girls' captivity titled Life among the Indians: or, The Captivity of the Oatman Girls Among the Apache & Mohave Indians. It was a bestseller for that era, at 30,000 copies. Stratton used the royalties from the book to pay for Olive and her brother Lorenzo to attend the University of the Pacific (1857). Olive and Lorenzo accompanied Stratton across the country on a book tour, promoting the book and lecturing in book circuits. Olive was a curiosity. Her boldly tattooed chin was on display and people came to hear her story and witness the blue tattoo for themselves. She was the first known tattooed White American woman as well as one of the first female public speakers. Olive entered the lecture circuit as feminism was developing. Though she herself never claimed to be part of the movement, her story entered the American consciousness shortly after the Seneca Falls Convention.

Both Oatman and Mary Brown, Sallie Fox's mother and Rose–Baley Party survivor, lived in San Jose, California, at the same time. Mary Brown refused a meeting.

Oatman married John Brant Fairchild (1830–1907) on November 9, 1865, in Rochester, New York. They met at a lecture she was giving alongside Stratton in Michigan. Fairchild was a wealthy rancher who had lost his brother to an attack by Native Americans during a cattle drive in Arizona in 1854, the same time Oatman was living among the Mohave. Stratton did not receive an invitation to the wedding, and Olive never reached out to him again. Stratton became institutionalized after the development of hereditary insanity and died in 1875.

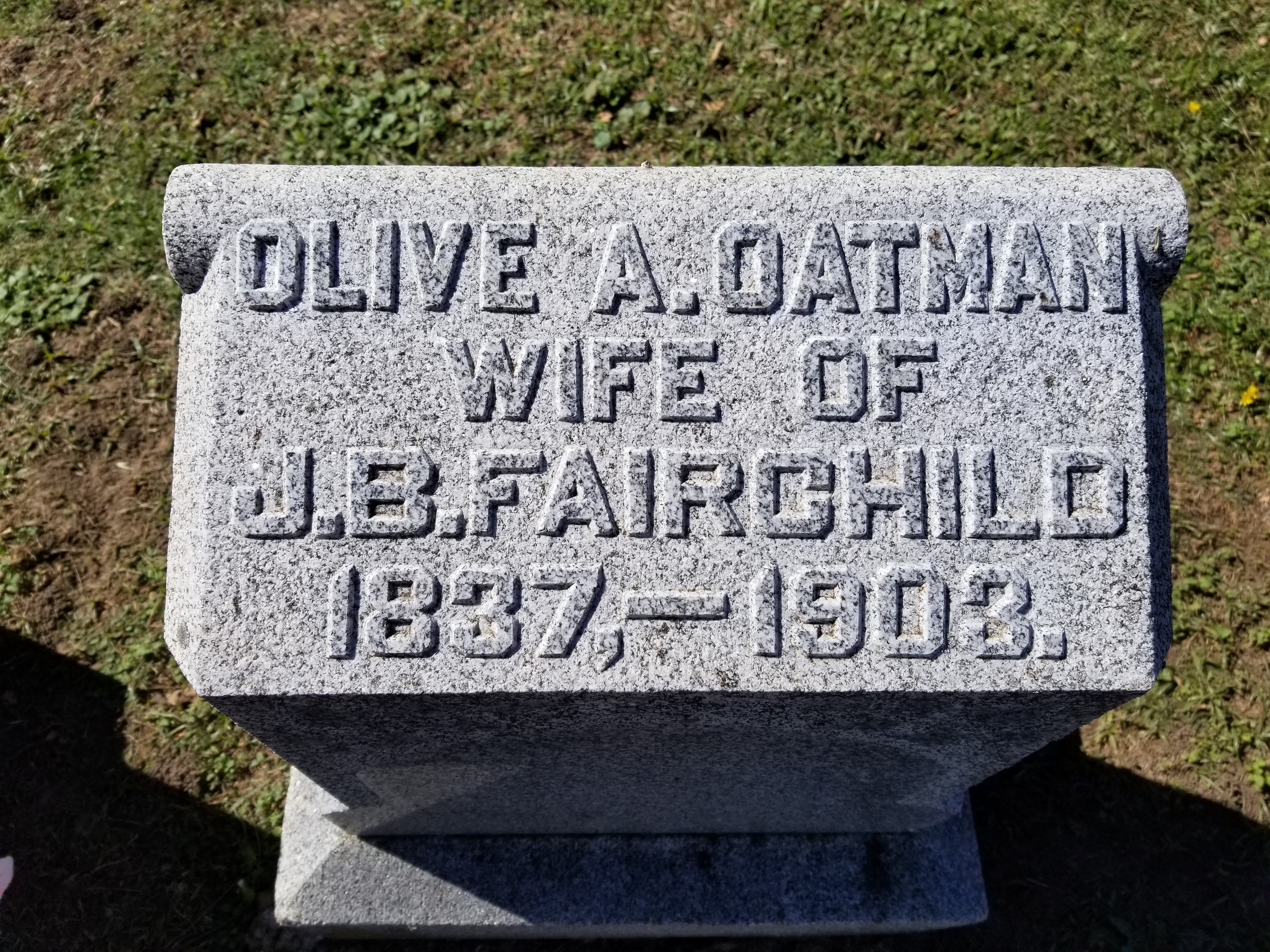
Grave marker at West Hill Cemetery in Sherman, Texas

Olive and John Fairchild moved to Sherman, Texas, a boom town ripe for a businessman like Fairchild to start a new and prosperous life. Fairchild founded the City Bank of Sherman and together they lived quietly in a large Victorian mansion. Olive began wearing a veil to cover her famous tattoo and became involved in charity work. She was particularly interested in helping a local orphanage. She and Fairchild never had their own children, but they did adopt a little girl and named her Mary Elizabeth after their mothers, nicknaming her Mamie. Her husband went on to track down copies of Stratton's book and burn them.

Her brother Lorenzo died on October 8, 1901. She outlived him by fewer than two years. Olive Oatman Fairchild died of a heart attack on March 20, 1903, at the age of 65. She is buried at the West Hill Cemetery in Sherman, Texas.

== Legacy ==
The town of Oatman, Arizona, located near her release site, was named in her honor in 1915. It was part of the Oatman Gold District. The once thriving gold rush town is now a tourist stop.

Named in her honor, the historic town of Olive City, Arizona, near the present town of Ehrenberg, was a steamboat stop on the Colorado River during the gold rush days. Other namesakes in Arizona are Oatman Mountain and the adjacent Oatman Flat. Oatman Flat Station was a stage stop for the Butterfield Overland Mail from 1858 to 1861.

== In popular culture ==
=== Television and film ===
- The character of Eva Oates, portrayed by Robin McLeavy in the AMC television series Hell on Wheels, is very loosely based on Oatman. Outside of being captured by a group of Native Americans, bearing the distinctive blue chin tattoo, and having been raised Mormon, there are very few similarities between the character of Eva Oates and the actual life of Oatman.
- In an episode of the series The Ghost Inside My Child: The Wild West and Tribal Quest, a southern American Baptist family claims that their daughter Olivia says she is the reincarnation of Olive Oatman.
- A 1965 episode of the TV series Death Valley Days titled "The Lawless Have Laws" recounts the story of Olive Oatman and features her brother Lorenzo's search for her. In this episode he finds her with the Mojave, with whom she wishes to stay.

=== Fiction inspired by Olive Oatman ===
- De Burton, Maria Ruiz. Who Would Have Thought It? J. B. Lippincott & Co., 1872.
- Grayson, Elizabeth. So Wide the Sky. Avon, 1997. ISBN 978-0380778461
- Leonard, Elmore. The Tonto Woman and Other Western Stories. Delacorte Press, 1998. ISBN 978-0385323864
- Lawton, Wendy. Ransom's Mark: A Story Based on the Life of the Young Pioneer Olive Oatman. Moody Publishers, 2003. ISBN 978-0802436382

== See also ==
- List of solved missing person cases
- Mary Jemison
- Frances Slocum
- Herman Lehmann
