= Oatman Flat Station =

Butterfield Overland Mail stagecoach stop in Arizona

- populated place
- Oatman Flat Station
- Location within Arizona
- Coordinates: 33°00′09″N 113°09′18″W
- Country: United States
- State: Arizona
- County: Maricopa
- Elevation: 502 ft (153 m)
- Time zone: UTC-7 (MST (no DST))

Oatman Flat Station, later Fourr's Stage Station, was a stagecoach station of the Butterfield Overland Mail located along the Gila River in Maricopa County, Arizona. The site was located 20 miles (32 km) east of Flap-Jack Ranch and 20 miles (32 km) west of Murderer's Grave Station, near the Gila River at Oatman Flat. It is to the east of the Oatman Grave (33°00′16″N 113°09′21″W), where the family of Olive Oatman was buried following their massacre on the Southern Emigrant Trail by Yavapai in 1851.
