= Mary Ann Oatman =

Kidnapped American child

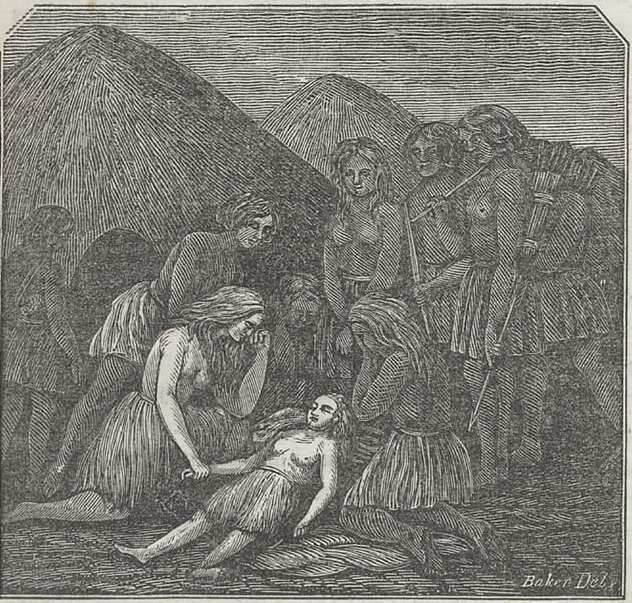
- Olive (left) and Mary Oatman, Captivity of the Oatman Girls, 1857
- Born: 1843; La Harpe, Illinois
- Died: 1855 (aged 11–12); Arizona
- Cause of death: Starvation
- Other name: Mary Ann Owich
- Known for: The Oatman Massacre
- Parent(s): Roys Oatman, Mary Ann Oatman
- Relatives: Olive Oatman Lorenzo Oatman

Mary Ann Oatman (1843 – c. 1855) was the sister of Olive Oatman. She is notable for surviving an attack on her family – the "Oatman Massacre" – by south-western Native Americans who, according to historian Brian McGinty, were likely Tolkepaya, of the Yavapai, in what is now Arizona. Mary Ann and her sister Olive were both abducted. Following their abduction, the sisters were traded to the Mohave tribe. The date of her death is uncertain. According to Olive Oatman, Mary Ann died of starvation as a result of a severe drought.

== Early life and the journey from La Harpe to Bashan ==
Mary Ann Oatman was the fourth of seven children born to Roys and Mary Ann Oatman, for whom she was named. She was born in 1843 in La Harpe, Illinois. The Oatmans were early converts to the Latter Day Saint movement, more commonly referred to as Mormonism, founded by Joseph Smith in the 1820s. After Smith's death in 1844, Brigham Young became the new leader of the movement. As the result of the succession crisis over this change in leadership, several new sects of the Latter Day Saints Movement splintered from the main organization. The Oatmans joined one of these sects, known as the Brewsterites.

The Brewsterites were founded in 1848 by James Colin Brewster and differed from the original movement in several ways. At age eleven, Brewster claimed to have had visions given by an ancient Hebrew prophet named Esdras. In these visions, he was told that Joseph Smith was a liar, and that the church must be reorganized with him as the leader. Unlike Smith's teachings, Brewster's sect forbade the practice of polygamy. Further, Brewster also claimed his visions allowed him to know "directions to the Mormons' true 'gathering place'." The Saints "would build their 'Zion' at the confluence of the Gila and Colorado rivers, at a place Esdras referred to as the "Land of Bashan".

Believing that they were immigrating to a divine country, the Oatmans set off from Illinois to Arizona on August 9, 1850. The trip began with James Brewster and fifty Brewsterites. After some tensions on the trail, the group split. Brewster and 32 members headed over the Sangre de Cristos toward Santa Fe. The other 18 members of the Oatman, Thompson, Wilder, Meteer, and Kelly families headed toward the Rio Grande Valley. .

== The Oatman Massacre ==
By 1851, the Oatmans' circumstances had become dire. As the family continued to make their way towards Bashan, they faced multiple run-ins with local Native nations and dwindling supplies, and were now alone because they had decided to separate from the group who had joined them in leaving Brewster.

On March 18, 1851, a group of Native Americans approached the family near Maricopa wells. Apache is a non-specific name that Olive used to describe the Yavapai. After a short bargaining interaction between Roys and the "Apache", the Native American party decided they were unable to come to a proper trade agreement with Roys. They clubbed to death nearly the entire family. The only survivors of the Oatman Family Massacre were Mary Ann, her sister Olive, and her brother Lorenzo, who had been injured and left for dead. He is known to have survived after finding a nearby settlement and receiving medical treatment.

Olive only referred to the tribe that massacred their family and abducted them as "Tonto Apaches" in all her interviews and in the book she compiled with Methodist minister Royal B. Stratton entitled Captivity of the Oatman Girls: Being an Interesting Narrative of Life among the Apache and Mohave Indians. Historian Timothy Braatz argues that referring to them as Apaches was most likely a "catch-all term for any mountain dwellers at odds with the Pima, and Maricopa..." Braatz and Brian McGinty further argue that the attackers were most likely members of the Yavapai tribe, not the Apache.

McGinty suggests the attackers were of the Tolkepaya, a band of the Yavapai tribe. McGinty argues that this band of the Yavapai most accurately fit the description of the attackers given the location of the attack, Olive's description of their village, testimony by a Dr. LeConte, an individual the family passed on the trail, and interviews from members of the Mohave tribe taken by anthropologist A.L Kroeber in the early 20th century. According to English professor Margot Mifflin, "The Oatman massacre was evidently inspired by the Yavapais' typical late winter hardship, exacerbated by the previous year's bone-cracking drought." Another possible reason for the attack was that because of the harsh climate Southwestern natives faced, many tribes practiced kidnapping as a form of family replacement.

== The abduction and the "adoption" by the Mohave ==
In The Captivity of the Oatman girls, Olive describes their life among the tribe as harsh. As with most of Olive's testimony, it is influenced by the brutal realities of life with Indians of her time, making it impossible to know if the girls did become integrated into their captors' society. The girls' uncertain treatment is also highlighted in Olive's own description of being traded to the Mohave tribe. Olive claims that she and Mary Ann refused to state which tribe they preferred to reside with, and that the children in the village wept when the girls departed to live with the Mohave. Olive claims that the trade occurred in 1851, and that she and her sister were traded to the Mohave tribe for a couple of horses and bags of beans. Once the sisters arrived in the Mohave village, they were taken in by Espaniola, his wife Aespaneo, and their daughter Topeka, who belonged to the Owich clan. Although Olive later identified Espaniola as the chief, he was most likely the Kohot, a religious leader.

During their time with the Mohave, according to Olive, the girls were given a plot of their own land and seeds to plant. Mohaves who were later interviewed about the girls shared that the sisters were also paid to sing hymns. Both girls also received facial tattoos codifying their place in the Mohave afterlife.

In Olive Oatman's narrative of her and Mary Ann's experiences, co-written with Methodist minister Royal Stratton, she highlights her unhappiness as well as a deep desire to escape. Historian Brian McGinty suggests that Olive's complaints and negative reflections need to be read within the context of the tales of horror inflicted on other settlers common to similar literature of the time. Her desire to escape proved difficult given that the sisters apparently were unable to reach safety or contact others even when seen from a distance. According to military commander Amiel Weeks Whipple, he and a group of his men had been in the area in February and March 1854 to survey a railroad route, and the sisters had not communicated with them.

It is unknown exactly how long Mary Ann resided with the Mohave before her death, but historian Brian McGinty argues that she died after three to four years from starvation during a famine resulting from a drought. Olive gave many different dates for the death of her sister, but McGinty claims that the first interview Olive gave of her experiences is the most trustworthy. In the first interview, in 1856, she states that her sister died one year ago, making her death date 1855. Olive states later in her book that she died in 1854, and in still later interviews 1853.

== Death and legacy ==
Historian Stephanie Wampler writes, "When Mary Ann was sick, the chief's wife made sure that Olive was allowed to sit with her sister. Then, after Mary Ann died, the chief's wife made sure that Olive was allowed to bury her sister according to her own customs and was given time to mourn for her afterward."

Olive states the girls were given as much food as possible by Topeka, but that Mary Ann and many other Mohave could simply not survive on such little portions.

== See also ==
- Mary Jemison
- Herman Lehmann
- Olive Oatman
- Frances Slocum
