= General Orders for Sentries =

Rules governing sentry (guard or watch) duty in the US Armed Forces

Orders to Sentry is the official title of a set of rules governing sentry (guard or watch) duty in the United States Armed Forces. While any guard posting has rules that may go without saying ("Stay awake", for instance), these orders are carefully detailed and particularly stressed in the U.S. Navy, U.S. Marine Corps, and U.S. Coast Guard. Also known as the 11 General Orders, the list is meant to cover any possible scenario a sentry might encounter on duty.

All recruits learn these orders verbatim while at recruit training and are expected to retain the knowledge to use for the remainder of their military careers. It is very common for a drill instructor or (after boot camp) an inspecting officer to ask a question concerning the orders and expect an immediate, correct reply.

== US Navy, Marine Corps, and Coast Guard ==
The General Orders for Sentries are quite similar between the U.S. Navy and U.S. Marine Corps, the main differences being the titles of positions referenced in the orders. The Naval Reserve Officer Training Corps (NROTC) also use the following General Orders to the Sentry.

The U.S. Department of the Navy gives the General Orders for the U.S. Marine Corps as follows:

1. To take charge of this post and all government property in view.
2. To walk my post in a military manner, keeping always on the alert and observing everything that takes place within sight or hearing.
3. To report all violations of orders I am instructed to enforce.
4. To repeat all calls from any post more distant from the guardhouse or quarterdeck than my own.
5. To quit my post only when properly relieved.
6. To receive, obey, and pass on to the sentry who relieves me all orders from the commanding officer, officer of the day, officers, and noncommissioned officers of the guard only.
7. To talk to no one except in the line of duty.
8. To give the alarm in case of fire or disorder.
9. To call the officer of the deck in any case not covered by instructions.
10. To salute all officers and all colors and standards not cased.
11. To be especially watchful at night and during the time for challenging, to challenge all persons on or near my post, and to allow no one to pass without proper authority.

== U.S. Army ==
The U.S. Army now uses a condensed form of orders, with three basic instructions. Previously it used the same eleven general orders as the U.S. Navy and U.S. Marines.

1. I will guard everything within the limits of my post and quit my post only when properly relieved.
2. I will obey my special orders and perform all my duties in a military manner.
3. I will report violations of my special orders, emergencies, and anything not covered in my instructions to the commander of the relief.

== U.S. Air Force Security Forces ==
The U.S. Air Force Security Forces also uses a condensed form, with three basics:

1. I will take charge of my post and protect personnel and property for which I am responsible, until properly relieved.
2. I will report all violations of orders that I am entrusted to enforce and call my superior in any case not covered by instructions.
3. I will sound the alarm in any case of disorder or emergency.
