= Herman Lehmann =

White captive, adopted son of Quanah Parker

- Born: Herman Lehmann; June 5, 1859; Loyal Valley, Texas
- Died: February 2, 1932 (aged 72); Mason County, Texas
- Resting place: Loyal Valley Cemetery
- Other names: Montechena, Montechema
- Citizenship: American
- Known for: Captured by Apaches; Joined Comanches; Adopted son of Quanah Parker
- Spouse(s): 1885 N.E. Burke (div.); 1896 Fannie Light
- Children: Five by Fannie Light

Herman Lehmann (June 5, 1859 – February 2, 1932) was captured as a child by Native Americans. He lived first among the Apache and then the Comanche but returned to his Euro-American birth family later in life. He published his autobiography, Nine Years Among the Indians, in 1927.

== Early life ==
Herman Lehmann was born near Mason, Texas, on June 5, 1859, to German immigrants Ernst Moritz Lehmann and Augusta Johanna Adams Lehmann. He was a third child, following a brother Gustave Adolph, born in 1855, and a sister Wilhelmina, born in 1857. The Lehmanns had another son, William F., born in 1861. Augusta had three more daughters, Emeliyn, Caroline Wilhelmina and Mathilde, but their birth order is unclear, as is their patrilineage. Moritz Lehmann died in 1862, and Augusta married local stonemason Philip Buchmeier in 1863.

== Kidnapping as a child ==
On May 16, 1870, a raiding party of eight to ten Apaches (probably Lipans) captured Herman Lehmann, who was almost eleven, and his eight-year-old brother, Willie, while they were in the fields at their mother's request scaring birds from the wheat. Their two sisters escaped without injury. Four days later, the Apache raiding party encountered a patrol of ten African-American cavalrymen led by Sgt. Emanuel Stance, who had been sent from Fort McKavett to recover the two Lehmann boys. In the short battle that followed, Willie Lehmann escaped, but the Apaches fled with young Herman. (Sergeant Stance became the first black regular to receive a Medal of Honor for his bravery on this mission.) The kidnapping site was designated a Recorded Texas Historic Landmark in 1991, Marker number 11283.

== Life with the Apaches ==
A few months after Lehmann's capture, the Apaches told Lehmann they had killed his entire family, depriving him of any incentive to attempt escape. The Apaches took Herman Lehmann to their village in eastern New Mexico. He was adopted by a man named Carnoviste and his wife, Laughing Eyes. A year after his capture, General William T. Sherman passed through Loyal Valley on an inspection tour. Augusta Lehmann Buchmeier was granted a private audience with Sherman to plead for his assistance in finding her son.

The Apaches called Lehmann "En Da" (Pale Boy). He spent about six years with them and became assimilated into their culture, rising to the position of petty chief. As a young warrior, one of his most memorable battles was a running fight with the Texas Rangers on August 24, 1875, which took place near Fort Concho, about 65 miles west of the site of San Angelo, Texas. Ranger James Gillett nearly shot Lehmann before he realized he was a white captive. When the Rangers tried to find Lehmann later, he escaped by crawling through the grass.

== Asylum with the Comanches ==
Around the spring of 1876, Herman Lehmann killed an Apache medicine man, avenging the killing of Carnoviste, his adoptive father. Fearing revenge, he fled from the Apaches and spent a year alone in hiding. He became lonely and decided to search for a Comanche tribe that he might join. He observed a tribe all day long then entered the camp just after dark. At first they were going to kill him, however, a young warrior approached him that spoke the Apache tongue. Lehmann then explained his situation—that he was born White adopted by the Indians and that he left the Apaches after killing the medicine man. Another brave came forward verifying his story and he was welcomed to stay. He joined the Comanches who gave him a new name, Montechema (meaning unknown).

In the spring of 1877, Lehmann and the Comanches attacked buffalo hunters on the high plains of Texas. Lehmann was wounded by hunters in a surprise attack on the Indian camp at Yellow House Canyon (present-day Lubbock, Texas) on March 18, 1877, the last major fight between Indians and non-Indians in Texas.

In July 1877, Comanche chief Quanah Parker, who had successfully negotiated the surrender of the last fighting Comanches in 1875, was sent in search of the renegades. Herman Lehmann was among the group that Quanah found camped on the Pecos River in eastern New Mexico. Quanah persuaded them to quit fighting and come to the Indian reservation near Fort Sill, Indian Territory (in present-day Oklahoma). While Lehmann initially refused to go, he later followed at Quanah's request.

== Return and adjustment ==
Herman Lehmann lived with Quanah Parker's family on the Kiowa-Comanche reservation in 1877–78. Several people took notice of the White boy living among the Native Americans. Lehmann's mother still searched for her son. She questioned Colonel Mackenzie, the commanding officer of Fort Sill, whether there were any blue eyed boys on the reservation. He said yes; however, the description led them to believe that this was not her boy. Nevertheless, she requested that the boy be brought to her.

In April 1878, Lt. Col. John W. Davidson ordered that Lehmann be sent under guard to his family in Texas. Five soldiers and a driver escorted Lehmann on a four-mule-drawn ambulance to Loyal Valley in Mason County, Texas. Lehmann arrived in Loyal Valley with an escort of soldiers on May 12, 1878, almost nine years after his capture. The people of Loyal Valley gathered to see the captive boy brought home. Upon his arrival, neither he nor his mother recognized one another. Lehmann had long believed his family dead, for the Apache had shown him proof during his time of transition to their way of life. It was his sister who found a scar on his arm, which had been caused by her when they were playing with a hatchet. His family surrounded him welcoming him home and the distant memories began to come back. Hearing someone repeat "Herman", he thought that sounded familiar and then realized it was his own name.

At first, he was sullen and wanted nothing to do with his mother and siblings. As he put it, "I was an Indian, and I did not like them because they were palefaces." Lehmann's readjustment to his original culture was slow and painful. He rejected food offered, and was unaccustomed to sleeping in a bed.

Herman Lehmann's first memoir, written with the assistance of Jonathan H. Jones, was published in 1899 under the title A Condensed History of the Apache and Comanche Indian Tribes for Amusement and General Knowledge (also known as Indianology). Lehmann hated this book for he felt Jones had taken liberty to fluff it up a bit.

Throughout his life, Herman Lehmann drifted between two very different cultures. Lehmann was a very popular figure in southwestern Oklahoma and the Texas Hill Country, appearing at county fairs and rodeos. To thrill audiences, such as he did in 1925 at the Old Settlers Reunion in Mason County, he would chase a calf around an arena, kill it with arrows, jump off his horse, cut out the calf's liver, and eat it raw.

His second autobiography, Nine Years Among the Indians (1927, edited by J. Marvin Hunter) was at the request of Lehmann. He requested that this time the book be written just as he told it. It is one of the finest captivity narratives in American literature, according to J. Frank Dobie.

Herman Lehmann's story also inspired Mason County native Fred Gipson's novel Savage Sam, a sequel to Old Yeller.

== Personal life and death ==
- July 16, 1885 – Herman Lehmann married N.E. Burke. The marriage ended in divorce, with conflicting accounts of the cause.
- March 4, 1896 – Lehmann married Fannie Light. The couple had two sons (Henry and John) and three daughters (Amelia, May, and Caroline). Although Lehmann deserted his second wife in Oklahoma in 1926, a divorce was never filed. Upon Lehmann's death, Fannie Light was his legal widow.

They left Texas and moved back to Indian Territory in 1900 to be close to his Apache and Comanche friends.

On August 26, 1901, Quanah Parker provided a legal affidavit verifying Lehmann's life as his adopted son 1877–1878. On May 29, 1908, the United States Congress authorized the United States Secretary of the Interior to allot Lehmann, as an adopted member of the Comanche nation, one hundred and sixty acres of Oklahoma land. Lehmann chose a site near Grandfield and moved there in 1910. He later deeded some of the property over for a school.

Lehmann died on February 2, 1932, in Loyal Valley, where he is buried next to his mother and stepfather in the cemetery next to the old Loyal Valley one-room school house.

== See also ==
- Mary Jemison
- Olive Oatman
- Mary Ann Oatman
- Frances Slocum

== Source material ==
- Greene, A. C. (1972) The Last Captive. Austin: The Encinco Press.
- Lehmann, Herman (1993) [1927]. Hunter, J. Marvin (ed.). Nine Years Among the Indians, 1870-1879. University of New Mexico Press. ISBN 0-8263-1417-1.
- Pioneers in God's Hills. Gillespie County Historical Society. 1960.
- Albertarelli, Rino (& Sergio Toppi). (1975) Herman Lehmann - L'indiano blanco. (Coll. I Protagonisti, 10.) Milano: Daim Press; reprints: Cinisello Balsamo: Hobby & Work, 1994 (880715093X); Milano: Sergio Bonelli, 1994; Milano: Sergio Bonelli, le Storie CULT, 2024. - Comic version.
- Zesch, Scott (2004). The Captured: A True Story of Abduction by Indians on the Texas Frontier. St. Martin's Press.
- La Vere, David (2005). Life among the Texas Indians: The WPA Narratives. TAMU Press. ISBN 978-1-58544-528-8.
- Chebahtah, William; Minor, Nancy McGown (2007). Chevato: The Story of the Apache Warrior Who Captured Herman Lehmann. Univ. of Nebraska Press. ISBN 978-0-8032-1097-4.
- Michno, Susan and Gregory (2007). A Fate Worse Than Death: Indian Captivities in the West 1830-1885. Caxton Press. ISBN 978-0-87004-451-9.
- "Immigration Database". Galveston Historical Foundation.
- Tiling, Moritz: The German Element in Texas from 1820 to 1850 and historical sketches of the German Texas Singers' League and Houston Turnverein from 1853 to 1913, Houston 1913, 1st ed.
