= Black Horse (Comanche) =

Comanche war chief (died c. 1900)

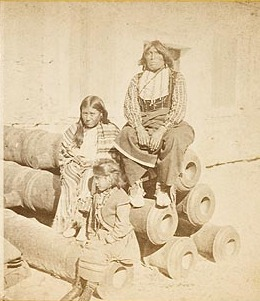
Black Horse, his wife, and daughter Akhah at Fort Marion Prison, St. Augustine, Florida, c. 1878

Black Horse or Tu-ukumah (died c. 1900), was a Comanche war chief. After Bull Bear died in 1874, Black Horse was promoted to second chief in the Quahadi band of Comanche.

He surrendered to the United States Army at Fort Sill, Indian Territory, at the end of the Red River War in early 1875. He was then sent along with ten other Comanche to Fort Marion in St. Augustine, Florida. His wife and daughter Akhah were allowed to join him, although they were not considered prisoners. He was released from captivity and returned to the Comanche reservation in Indian Territory in 1878. Quanah Parker was only made Chief by the United States Army, because the Comanches did not want a Chief after captivity.

== Death ==
Black Horse died around 1900 in Cache, Oklahoma Territory.
