= Farm to Market Road 179 =

Road in Texas, United States

Farm to Market Road 179

Route information
- Maintained by TxDOT
- Length: 106.931 mi (172.089 km)
- Existed: 1945–present

Major junctions
- South end: US 87 in Lamesa
- US 380; US 62 / US 82 in Wolfforth; US 84 in Shallowater; US 70
- North end: SH 194 northwest of Plainview

Location
- Country: United States
- State: Texas
- Counties: Dawson, Lynn, Lubbock, Hale

Highway system
- Highways in Texas; Interstate; US; State; Former; Toll; Loops; Spurs; FM/RM; Park; Rec
← FM 178	→ FM 180

Farm to Market Road 179 (FM 179) is a farm to market road in the U.S. state of Texas. The highway runs from U.S. Highway 87 (US 87) in Lamesa to State Highway 194 (SH 194) approximately 15 miles (24 km) northwest of Plainview.

== History ==
FM 179 was first designated on June 11, 1945 along a county road in Dawson County from Lamesa north 5.0 miles (8.0 km). On September 29, 1948, another section of FM 179 from SH 137 at Welch southeast 7.8 miles (12.6 km) to 1 mile north of Grandview school was created, creating a gap. On December 16, 1948, the 8-mile gap was closed. On March 24, 1953, FM 179 was rerouted north to FM 213, replacing part of FM 2053, with the old route west to Welch becoming part of FM 2053 instead. On January 8, 1960, FM 179 gained 17.8 miles (28.6 km) when it was combined with FM 2081, extending the road to FM 1317. On August 20, 1964, the highway gained another 28.8 miles (46.3 km) from FM 1073, 11.2 miles (18.0 km) from FM 401, and 21.6 miles (34.8 km) from FM 594, extending the road to US 70. Previously, part of FM 594 was FM 1069 and part of FM 1073 was FM 1316. FM 179 reached its current length on September 19, 1968 when most of FM 1070 was combined with the highway.

== Route description ==
FM 179 begins at an intersection with US 87 in northeastern Lamesa. The highway intersects with FM 2592 (North 22nd Street) before leaving the town and traveling through rural Dawson County. FM 179 runs through rural Lynn County and southern Lubbock County before entering the town of Wolfforth, intersecting with US 62/US 82. The highway leaves Wolfforth and runs through unincorporated Lubbock County before entering the city of Lubbock in the Hurlwood neighborhood. FM 179 leaves Lubbock and runs through an unincorporated area of the county before entering the town of Shallowater. The highway runs concurrently with US 84 before returning to a separate routing. FM 179 runs through rural western Hale County before ending at an intersection with SH 194 northwest of Plainview.

== Junction list ==
County	Location	mi	km	Destinations	Notes
Dawson	Lamesa	0.0	0.0	US 87 (Lynn Avenue) – Big Spring, Tahoka	
Dawson	Lamesa	0.1	0.16	FM 2592 (North 22nd Street)	
Dawson		3.1	5.0	FM 2411 east	
Dawson		10.2	16.4	FM 1066	
Dawson		14.2	22.9	FM 2053 west – Welch	South end of FM 2053 overlap
Lynn		15.3	24.6	FM 2053 east – O'Donnell	North end of FM 2053 overlap
Lynn		20.3	32.7	FM 213 east	South end of FM 213 overlap
Lynn		21.3	34.3	FM 213 west	North end of FM 213 overlap
Lynn		31.1	50.1	US 380 – Brownfield, Tahoka	
Lynn		41.1	66.1	FM 1317 east	
Lynn		44.1	71.0	FM 211 – Meadow, New Home	
Lubbock		50.2	80.8	FM 41 (194th Street) – Ropesville, Slide	
Lubbock		54.7	88.0	FM 1585 (130th Street)	Future Loop 88
Lubbock	Wolfforth	56.5	90.9	US 62 / US 82 – Brownfield, Lubbock	
Lubbock	Wolfforth	57.1	91.9	Loop 193 (Main Street)	
Lubbock	Lubbock	61.7	99.3	SH 114 (19th Street) – Levelland, Lubbock	
Lubbock	Lubbock	62.7	100.9	FM 2255 (4th Street) – Reese Center	
Lubbock	Shallowater	69.4	111.7	US 84 – Littlefield, Lubbock	
Lubbock	Shallowater	69.9	112.5	Loop 388 east	South end of Loop 388 overlap
Lubbock	Shallowater	70.1	112.8	FM 1294	
Lubbock		70.7	113.8	US 84 east – Lubbock	North end of Loop 388 overlap; south end of US 84 overlap
Lubbock		72.2	116.2	US 84 west – Littlefield	North end of US 84 overlap
Lubbock		79.8	128.4	FM 597 – Anton, Abernathy	
Hale		83.3	134.1	FM 54 west – Littlefield	South end of FM 54 overlap
Hale		85.3	137.3	FM 54 east – Petersburg	North end of FM 54 overlap
Hale	Cotton Center	93.3	150.2	FM 37 west – Amherst	South end of FM 37 overlap
Hale	Cotton Center	93.4	150.3	FM 37 east	North end of FM 37 overlap
Hale		98.4	158.4	FM 1914 east – Hale Center	
Hale		102.0	164.2	FM 1071 west	South end of FM 1071 overlap
Hale		103.0	165.8	FM 1071 east	North end of FM 1071 overlap
Hale		107.0	172.2	US 70 west – Olton	South end of US 70 overlap
Hale		109.0	175.4	US 70 east – Plainview	North end of US 70 overlap
Hale		117.2	188.6	SH 194 – Hart, Plainview	
1.000 mi = 1.609 km; 1.000 km = 0.621 mi: Concurrency terminus
