= Shallowater =

Shallowater may refer to:

- Shallowater, Texas, a community in the United States
- Shallowater Independent School District, a public school district in Shallowater
- Shallowater (band), a slowcore musical group originally from Lubbock, Texas

== See also ==
- Shallow water
