= Farm to Market Road 1730 =

Road in Texas, United States

Farm to Market Road 1730

Route information
- Maintained by TxDOT
- Length: 14.540 mi (23.400 km)
- Existed: 1951–present

Major junctions
- South end: FM 1317 south of New Home
- North end: Loop 88 / FM 1585 in Lubbock

Location
- Country: United States
- State: Texas
- Counties: Lynn, Lubbock

Highway system
- Highways in Texas; Interstate; US; State; Former; Toll; Loops; Spurs; FM/RM; Park; Rec
| ← FM 1729 | → FM 1731 |

Farm to Market Road 1730 (FM 1730) is a farm to market road located in the South Plains region of Texas. FM 1730 is known locally in Lubbock as Slide Road.

== Route description ==
FM 1730 begins at an intersection with FM 1317 in rural Lynn County. The highway enters the small community of New Home before running in unincorporated Lynn County again. Just north of New Home, FM 1730 crosses into Lubbock County and serves the town of Slide a few miles north of here. the highway enters the city limits of Lubbock for a short time before ending at FM 1585.

== History ==
FM 1730 was first designated on May 23, 1951 along Slide Road and Lubbock County Road 1900 between Slide and US 62 (34th Street). The highway was later extended further south to New Home on January 18, 1952, absorbing approximately 3 miles of FM 1317. On November 28, 1955, the northern terminus of the highway was shortened by a mile to Loop 289. On June 27, 1995, the mileage of FM 1730 between FM 1585 and Loop 289 was transferred to UR 1730, but this section became part of FM 1730 again on November 15, 2018. On December 10, 2020, the section from FM 1585 (proposed Loop 88) to Loop 289 was cancelled and given to the city of Lubbock.

== Junction list ==
| County | Location | mi | km | Destinations | Notes |
|---|---|---|---|---|---|
| Lynn | | 0.0 | 0.0 | FM 1317 | |
| Lynn | New Home | 3.0 | 4.8 | FM 211 – Meadow, Wilson | |
| Lubbock | | 9.8 | 15.8 | FM 41 – Ropesville, Slaton | |
| Lubbock | Lubbock | 14.3 | 23.0 | Loop 88 / FM 1585 / Slide Road | Interchange; northern terminus, road continues north as Slide Road; future US 84 |
1.000 mi = 1.609 km; 1.000 km = 0.621 mi
