= Texas State Highway Loop 88 =

State highway in Texas

State Highway Loop 88
- Lubbock Outer Route
- Loop 88 highlighted in red

Route information
- Maintained by TxDOT
- Length: 36.0 mi (57.9 km)
- History: Designated on July 27, 2017; Opened to traffic April 16, 2026

Major junctions
- CCW end: US 84 near Shallowater
- US 62 / US 82 near Wolfforth; I-27 / US 87 in Lubbock
- CW end: US 84 near Slaton

Location
- Country: United States
- State: Texas
- Counties: Lubbock

Highway system
- Highways in Texas; Interstate; US; State; Former; Toll; Loops; Spurs; FM/RM; Park; Rec
← Loop 87	→ Loop 90

State Highway Loop 88 (Loop 88) is a partially completed state highway loop in Lubbock County, Texas, that will form a bypass around the city of Lubbock. The Loop 88 designation has been approved by local governments such as Lubbock, Texas while the Texas Department of Transportation (TxDOT) builds the project, currently known as the Lubbock Outer Route.

The route will start at the intersection of U.S. Highway 84 (US 84) northwest of Lubbock near Shallowater and head south and intersect State Highway 114 (SH 114) near Reese Center and continue towards Wolfforth where it will intersect US 62 and US 82 then head east toward US 87 and Slaton, where it will end at US 84. The southern stretch from Wolfforth to Slaton will overlap Farm to Market Road 1585. The highway will serve as a bypass for US 84 around Lubbock; the current route of US 84 through the city will be re-designated as U.S. Route 84 Business upon the completion of Loop 88. I-27 was extended south 4.2 miles (6.8 km) from Loop 289 to County Road 7500 in September 2024.

TxDOT began construction in late 2021. The loop will be built in 4 segments: Segments 1 and 2 will be from US 84 near Shallowater to US 62/82 near Wolfforth; Segment 3 will be from US 62/82 to US 87 in south Lubbock; and Segment 4 will be from US 87 to US 84 near Slaton. Construction is expected to last 12 to 15 years.

== History ==
An earlier route, also designated as Loop 88 was designated on December 18, 1939 from U.S. Highway 83 through San Ygnacio to another point on US 83. On June 21, 1990, this route was cancelled, as it was transferred to Business US 83-N. The current route was proposed to be Loop 88 in 2016, but was not officially designated as Loop 88 until July 27, 2017.

=== Construction ===
The project was partially stalled in late 2017 when TxDOT found what it thought to be either mammoth or bison bones near the intersection of FM 179 and 130th Street during an environmental impact study. Groundbreaking was held on November 3, 2021 near the intersection of FM 1585 (future Loop 88) and Indiana Avenue. Construction of Segment 3 between Chicago Avenue and Avenue U is expected to be complete in 2026 at a cost of $154.8 million.

The first section of the freeway, running between Chicago Avenue and University Avenue, opened to traffic on April 16, 2026.

== Exit list ==
The entire route is in Lubbock County. All exits are unnumbered.

Location	mi	km	Destinations	Notes
	0.00	0.00	US 84 / FM 2641	Counterclockwise end of Segment 1; Future counterclockwise terminus
			County Road 1600	
			FM 179 (County Road 1400)	
			Urusline Street (County Road 6400)	
			County Road 2255 (4th Street)	
Lubbock			SH 114 (19th Street)	Clockwise end of Segment 1; Counterclockwise end of Segment 2
Lubbock			County Road 6800 (34th Street)	Clockwise exit and counterclockwise entrance
Lubbock			50th Street (County Road 6900)	
			County Road 7100	
			FM 1585	
			US 62 / US 82	Clockwise end of Segment 2; Counterclockwise end of Segment 3
			FM 1585 west / Quitsna Avenue	
			FM 179 (Inler Avenue)	
Lubbock			Alcove Avenue	
Lubbock			Upland Avenue	
Lubbock			Milwaukee Avenue	
Lubbock			Frankford Avenue	
Lubbock			Chicago Avenue	Current counter-clockwise end; westbound exit and eastbound entrance
Lubbock			FM 1730 / Slide Road	Westbound exit and eastbound entrance
Lubbock			Quaker Avenue	
Lubbock			Indiana Avenue	
Lubbock			University Avenue	
			Avenue P	
			I-27 / US 87 – Lubbock, Tahoka	Clockwise end of Segment 3; Counterclockwise end of Segment 4; future stack interchange; I-27 exit 527
Lubbock			FM 1585 east / Martin Luther King Jr Blvd	
Lubbock			County Road 2700	
Lubbock			County Road 2900	
Lubbock			County Road 3100	
Lubbock	36.00	57.94	US 84	Clockwise end of segment 4; Future clockwise terminus
1.000 mi = 1.609 km; 1.000 km = 0.621 mi
