= O'Donnell High School =

Location
- 400 Small St. O'Donnell, Texas 79351-0487; United States; 32.9687°N 101.8291°W

Information
- School type: Public high school
- School district: O'Donnell Independent School District
- Principal: Michael Bagley
- Teaching staff: 33.99 (FTE)
- Grades: PK-12
- Enrollment: 271 (2023–2024)
- Student to teacher ratio: 7.97
- Colors: Black & Gold
- Athletics conference: UIL Class A
- Mascot: Eagle/Lady Eagle
- Website: O'Donnell High School website

O'Donnell High School is a 1A high school located in O'Donnell, Texas (USA). It is part of the O'Donnell Independent School District located in southeast Lynn County. In 2011, the school was rated "Academically Acceptable" by the Texas Education Agency.

== Athletics ==
The O'Donnell Eagles compete in the following sports:

Cross Country, 6-Man Football, Basketball, Track & Baseball

== Notable alumnus ==
Dan Blocker - Actor/played role of "Hoss" in the NBC television series Bonanza.
