= Grassland, Texas =

- Town
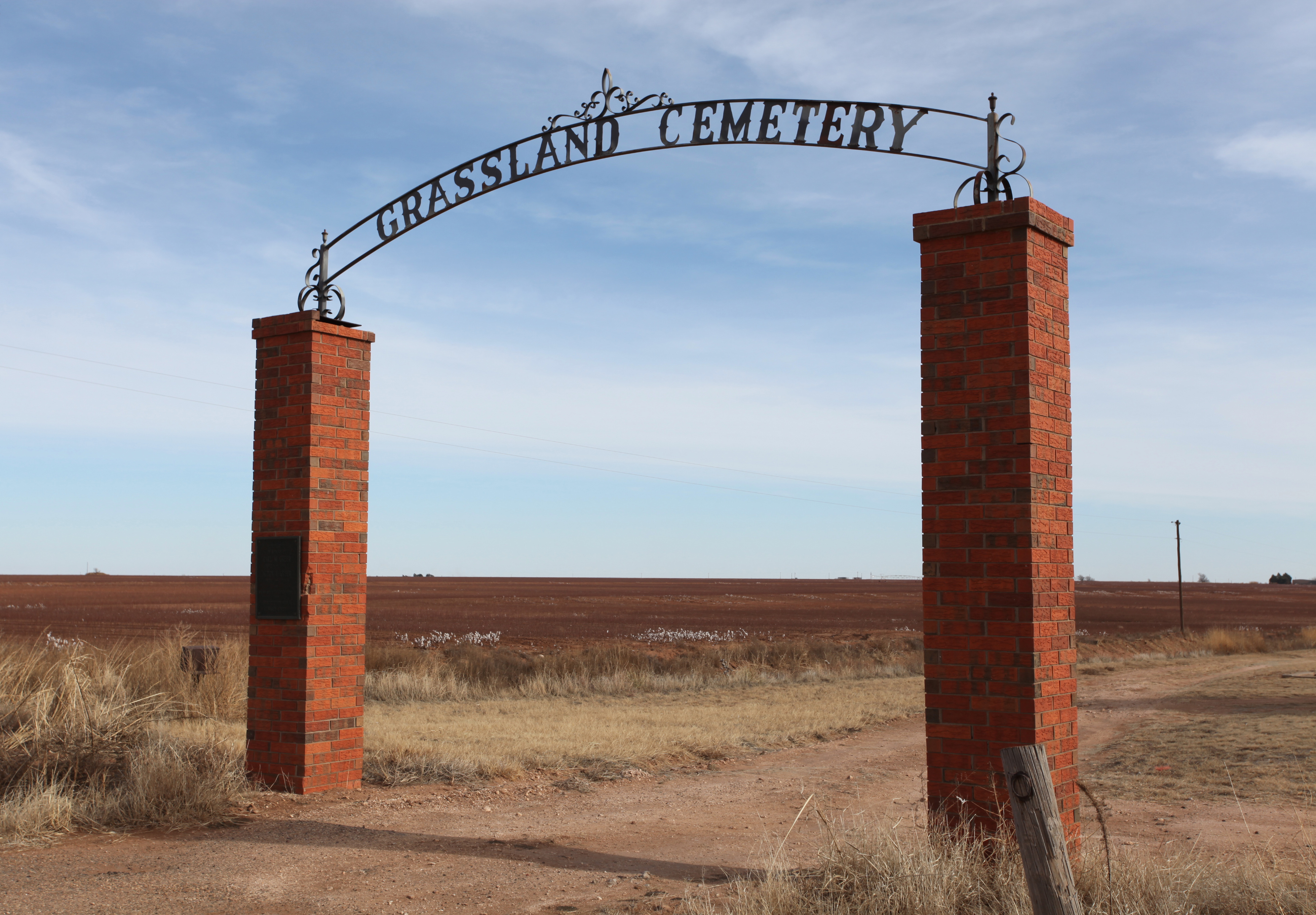
- Grassland Cemetery

- Location of Grassland in Texas
- Coordinates: 33°08′11″N 101°35′50″W
- Country: United States
- State: Texas
- County: Lynn
- Physiographic region: Llano Estacado
- Founded: 1888
- Elevation: 2,956 ft (901 m)

Population (2000)
  - Total: 61
- Time zone: UTC-6 (Central (CST))
  - Summer (DST): UTC-5 (CDT)
- Postal code: 79373
- Area code: 806
- Website: Handbook of Texas

Grassland is an unincorporated community in Lynn County, West Texas, United States. According to the Handbook of Texas, the community had an estimated population of 61 in 2000.

== Geography ==
Grassland lies on the level plains of the Llano Estacado in West Texas. It is situated at the junction of Farm Roads 212 and 1313 in east central Lynn County, approximately two miles south of U.S. Highway 380 and two miles west of the Garza County line.

== History ==
The community was founded in 1888 and grew up around a ranch owned by Enos Seeds and his brother, Thomas. A post office was established at the site on January 12, 1889. It remained operational until May 7, 1900. During the early 1900s, former ranch lands were divided into smaller plots and sold for farming and other agricultural purposes. Grassland School District No. 21 was created in 1916 to serve local students. That same year, Grassland Methodist Church was organized. The community's status as a hub of religious activities was furthered with the organization of two more churches, the Central Baptist Church of Grassland and Grassland Nazarene during the early 1920s. A total of 76 people were living in Grassland by 1930. That number grew to roughly 200 in 1940.

On September 26, 1940, high school students from Grassland and several other rural districts were sent to Tahoka, following the trend of school consolidation found throughout the state at the time. The consolidation process was completed on June 26, 1953, when Grassland's school closed and all students were bussed to nearby Tahoka. The community managed to maintain its peak population of approximately 200 through 1960s, but a marked decline took place during that decade. By 1970, Grassland home to around 60 residents. It remained at that level through 2000.

== Education ==
Public education in the community of Grassland is provided by the Tahoka Independent School District.

== See also ==
- Llano Estacado
- Caprock Escarpment
- Double Mountain Fork Brazos River
- Salt Fork Brazos River
