= KAMZ =

Tahoka, Texas; United States
- Broadcast area: Lubbock metropolitan area
- Frequency: 103.5 MHz (HD Radio)
- Branding: La Ley 103.5

Programming
- Language: Spanish
- Format: Regional Mexican
- Subchannels: HD2: Retro Tejano (Tejano)

Ownership
- Owner: Christina Benavides

History
- First air date: June 27, 1997; 28 years ago
- Former call signs: KAWD (1997–2000)

Technical information
- Licensing authority: FCC
- Facility ID: 77643
- Class: C3
- ERP: 20,000 watts
- HAAT: 100 meters (330 ft)
- Transmitter coordinates: 33°19′26.3″N 101°48′16.6″W

Links
- Public license information: Public file; LMS
- Webcast: Listen live HD2: Listen live
- Website: laley1035fm.com HD2: retrotejano.com

KAMZ (103.5 MHz, "La Ley 103.5") is a radio station broadcasting a Regional Mexican format. Licensed to Tahoka, Texas, United States, the station serves the Lubbock area. The station is currently owned by Rick Benavides.

== History ==
The station went on the air as KAWD on June 27, 1997. On December 4, 2000, the station changed its call sign to the current KAMZ.
