= Shallowater (band) =

American indie rock band

- Origin: Lubbock, Texas, U.S.
- Genres: Slowcore; alternative country
- Years active: 2021–present
- Members: Tristan Kelly; Blake Skipper; Ryan Faulkenberry

Shallowater is an American slowcore band, formed in 2021 in Lubbock, Texas, by Tristan Kelly (bass guitar), Blake Skipper (guitar, vocals), and Ryan Faulkenberry (drums). Now based in Houston, they have released two studio albums, There Is a Well and God's Gonna Give You a Million Dollars, in 2023 and 2025, respectively.

== History ==
Tristan Kelly and Blake Skipper met in 2018, at the Gypsy House venue in Lubbock, Texas. They became friends, and Kelly invited Skipper to go to South by Southwest with him and four other people; at the music festival, many people told them that they looked like they were in a band, leading Skipper to have the idea that they should start a band. Kelly had never played music before, and no one ended up arriving to any practices, but he was able to learn from Skipper for about a year until he moved out of Lubbock—Skipper had to stay behind to finish up school. During the COVID-19 pandemic in 2020, Kelly moved back to Texas and met Ryan Faulkenberry at his friend's house, inviting him to play with Skipper and him once Kelly found out that he played the drums. The trio kept practicing together until 2021, when they officially formed the band and named it. The name Shallowater came from a sign that the band saw when they appeared in the music video for Hayden Pedigo's song "Letting Go," which was filmed in Shallowater, Texas. The band later moved to Houston for better connections and opportunities.

Shallowater released their debut studio album, There Is a Well, on December 30, 2023. In 2024, they toured with Horse Jumper of Love and They Are Gutting a Body of Water. The band was also cosigned by Ethel Cain on Instagram. On July 22, 2025, Shallowater announced that their second album, God's Gonna Give You a Million Dollars, would be released on September 5. The announcement was accompanied with the single "Highway." The album's second single, "Sadie," was released on August 18. Upon the album's release, it received a positive review from BPM and was named Stereogum's album of the week.

== Influences and musical style ==
The band describes their sound as "West Texas dirtgaze." Shallowater's work has been described as a mix of slowcore, post-rock, alternative country, emo, and post-hardcore, with influences such as Neil Young, Sunny Day Real Estate, Acetone, Hum, and Red House Painters. Blake Skipper, the band's vocalist, sings in a soft whisper and only occasionally raises his voice. The band prefers to stretch out their songs to allow for more space between verses and choruses.

== Discography ==
=== Studio albums ===
| Title | Details |
|---|---|
| There Is a Well | Released: December 30, 2023; Label: Self-released; Formats: CD, LP record, digital download |
| God's Gonna Give You a Million Dolllars | Released: September 5, 2025; Label: Self-released; Formats: CD, LP record, digital download |

=== Singles ===
| Title | Year | Album |
|---|---|---|
| "Angels (Acoustic)" | 2025 | Non-album single |
| "Highway" | 2025 | God's Gonna Give You a Million Dollars |
| "Sadie" | 2025 | God's Gonna Give You a Million Dollars |
