= U.S. Route 84 in Texas =

Highway in Texas

U.S. Highway 84
- US 84 highlighted in red

Route information
- Maintained by TxDOT
- Length: 530.369 mi (853.546 km)
- Existed: 1935–present

Major junctions
- West end: US 60 / US 70 / US 84 at New Mexico state line near Farwell
- I-27 in Lubbock; I-20 from Roscoe to Abilene; US 83 / US 277 in Abilene; I-35 in Waco; I-45 in Fairfield Future I-69 / Future I-369 / US 59 / US 96 in Tenaha
- East end: Future I-69 / US 84 at Louisiana state line near Joaquin

Location
- Country: United States
- State: Texas
- Counties: Parmer, Bailey, Lamb, Hockley, Lubbock, Lynn, Garza, Scurry, Mitchell, Nolan, Taylor, Coleman, Brown, Mills, Hamilton, Coryell, McLennan, Limestone, Freestone, Anderson, Cherokee, Rusk, Shelby

Highway system
- United States Numbered Highway System; List; Special; Divided; Highways in Texas; Interstate; US; State; Former; Toll; Loops; Spurs; FM/RM; Park; Rec
← SH 83	→ US 85

U.S. Route 84 (US 84) is a U.S. highway that runs from Pagosa Springs, Colorado, to Midway, Georgia. In Texas, the highway enters the state from New Mexico at Farwell, near the Panhandle region. Major cities along the highway include Lubbock, Abilene, Waco, and Palestine. The highway exits Texas into Louisiana near Joaquin, crossing the Toledo Bend Reservoir.

== Route description ==
US 84 enters into Texas at Farwell, concurrent with US 70 from New Mexico. The US 70 overlap ends in Muleshoe. US 84 bypasses the towns of Littlefield and Shallowater before entering Lubbock. The highway just passes north of the Texas Tech University campus and enters downtown as Avenue Q. As Avenue Q, the highway parallels I-27 before crossing it, just north of that highway's southern terminus. Leaving the city, US 84 serves the towns of Post and Snyder before reaching Roscoe, where it begins its overlap with I-20.

The two highways run through Sweetwater before reaching Abilene. US 84 leaves the interstate on the western side of the city, running with I-20's business loop. US 84 joins US 83/US 277 (Winters Freeway), with US 277 leaving the concurrency after a short distance. US 84 leaves US 83, northeast of Tuscola. US 84 runs southeast to Coleman, overlapping with US 283 in the process and joining US 67. After leaving Brownwood, US 84 leaves US 67 and joins US 183. US 84 becomes a solo route again in Goldthwaite, traveling through Gatesville. In Gatesville, the highway meets SH 36, which coincidentally also runs to Abilene, albeit in a more direct way than US 84.

East of McGregor, US 84 becomes a four-lane divided highway before becoming a freeway in Woodway. At SH 6, US 84 becomes a surface street, running through Waco. The highway crosses the Brazos River and enters Bellmead before leaving the Waco area to the northeast/east. The highway crosses I-45 in Fairfield and the Trinity River just before Palestine, then runs through several smaller communities in East Texas before meeting US 59 (future I-69) in Timpson and follows that highway to Tenaha. It continues due east and crosses over the Toledo Bend Reservoir/Sabine River, into Louisiana, at Logansport, in the area where that river starts to form the Texas/Louisiana state border.

US 84 is part of the El Camino East/West Corridor, which spans five states starting in Texas.

== Future ==
Studies are underway to build a completely new route of US 84 around the city of Lubbock, in an attempt to relieve traffic going into the city. This bypass, tentatively named Loop 88, started construction in late 2021.

In Abilene, Winters Freeway from Canyon Rock Road to FM 707 is beginning upgrades. This includes converting two-way frontage roads to one-way, adding U-turns, removing the crossover of Iberis Road, and building a crossover near Lytle Creek.

An upgrade is in progress along US 84 from Ritchie Road to Harris Creek Road; this includes implementing a divide-interchange with Speegleville Road in south Waco.

US 84 in Tenaha between the US 59/US 96/Future I-69/Future I-369 interchange to the Louisiana state line will become part of I-69. US 96's northern terminus will remain, and this is expected to be the southern terminus of I-369. This would make I-369 the longest auxiliary route in the US, surpassing I-476.

== Major intersections ==
All exits are unnumbered.

County	Location	mi	km	Destinations	Notes
Parmer	Farwell	0.0	0.0	US 70 west / US 84 west – Texico, Clovis	New Mexico state line
Parmer	Farwell	0.6	0.97	FM 292	
Parmer		2.9	4.7	FM 145 east – Hart	
Parmer		8.4	13.5	Loop 403 east – Lariat	
Parmer		9.4	15.1	Loop 403 west – Lariat	
Parmer		10.1	16.3	FM 1731 – Bovina	
Bailey		18.1	29.1	FM 2079 north	
Bailey		19.4	31.2	FM 1760 west	
Bailey	Muleshoe	21.8	35.1	US 70 east / SH 214 (First Street) – Muleshoe National Wildlife Refuge	East end of US 70 overlap; Access to Muleshoe Area Hospital
Bailey		25.7	41.4	FM 3269 north	
Lamb		34.1	54.9	FM 746 west	
Lamb	Sudan	37.7	60.7	FM 298 west / FM 303	
Lamb	Sudan	38.2	61.5	FM 1843 east	
Lamb		45.2	72.7	FM 37 / FM 1055 north – Amherst, Earth	
Lamb	Littlefield	50.3	81.0	Loop 430 east – Littlefield	
Lamb	Littlefield	52.0	83.7	FM 54 – Littlefield	Interchange
Lamb	Littlefield	54.0	86.9	US 385 – Littlefield, Levelland	Interchange
Lamb	Littlefield	56.0	90.1	Loop 430 west – Littlefield	
Lamb		59.8	96.2	Loop 385 east	
Lamb		61.2	98.5	Loop 385 west	
Lamb		61.6	99.1	FM 1072 north	
Hockley	Anton	66.0	106.2	FM 168 south / FM 597 – Smyer, Morton, Anton	
Hockley	Anton	66.9	107.7	FM 168 north	
Hockley	Roundup	70.7	113.8	FM 2130	
Lubbock		72.4	116.5	FM 2378 south	
Lubbock		76.4	123.0	FM 179 north – County Line	West end of FM 179 overlap
Lubbock		77.8	125.2	Loop 388 east	
Lubbock		78.2	125.9	FM 1294 – Shallowater	
Lubbock	Shallowater	78.7	126.7	FM 179 south – Shallowater, Wolfforth	Interchange; east end of FM 179 overlap
Lubbock	Shallowater	80.2	129.1	Loop 388 west / County Road 1540 – Shallowater	
Lubbock		82.9	133.4	FM 2641 – Airport	Future Loop 88 west
Lubbock		83.5	134.4	FM 2528 (Frankford Avenue)	Interchange
Lubbock	Lubbock	86.8	139.7	Loop 289 (North Loop) / Landmark Lane – Lubbock Lake National Historic Landmark	Interchange
Lubbock	Lubbock	88.4	142.3	FM 1264 north (N. University Avenue) – Texas Tech University	
Lubbock	Lubbock	89.5	144.0	Spur 326 north (Avenue Q)	no left turn eastbound
Lubbock	Lubbock	89.6	144.2	US 82 (Marsha Sharp Freeway) – Texas Tech University	
Lubbock	Lubbock	90.7	146.0	US 62 / SH 114 (19th Street) – Texas Tech University	
Lubbock	Lubbock	93.4	150.3	I-27 / US 87 – Amarillo, Tahoka	Interchange; I-27 exit 1B
Lubbock	Lubbock	95.1	153.0	Loop 289 (Southeast Loop) / Martin Luther King, Jr. Boulevard	interchange
Lubbock	Lubbock	97.6	157.1	FM 3431 south / Olive Avenue – Montford Unit	
Lubbock	Lubbock	98.1	157.9	Spur 331 north	Interchange; no eastbound exit
Lubbock		101.2	162.9	FM 835 west – Buffalo Springs Lake, Ransom Canyon	
Lubbock		103.0	165.8	FM 1585 west	Future Loop 88
Lubbock	Slaton	105.2	169.3	Bus. US 84 east / FM 400 – Slaton	interchange; west end of freeway; eastbound exit and westbound entrance
Lubbock	Slaton	105.7	170.1	Woodrow Road	
Lubbock	Slaton	106.8	171.9	FM 41 (Division Street)	
Lubbock	Slaton	108.4	174.5	Bus. US 84 / FM 400 – Slaton, Wilson	interchange; east end of freeway
Lynn		111.7	179.8	FM 212 south	
Garza	Southland	115.1	185.2	Spur 45 east	
Garza	Southland	115.3	185.6	FM 2106 south	
Garza		119.9	193.0	FM 211	
Garza		122.4	197.0	FM 399	
Garza		123.8	199.2	FM 2282 west	
Garza	Post	130.8	210.5	Spur 575 east	
Garza	Post	131.3	211.3	US 380 east to SH 207 / FM 651 – Clairemont	West end of US 380 overlap
Garza	Post	131.4	211.5	US 380 west to FM 669 – Tahoka	East end of US 380 overlap
Garza	Post	132.5	213.2	Loop 46 north to SH 207 / FM 651	
Garza	Justiceburg	145.8	234.6	FM 2458 east – Lake Alan Henry, Sam Wahl Recreational Area	
Garza		150.7	242.5	FM 1269 south – Fluvanna	
Scurry		160.6	258.5	FM 612 west – Fluvanna	
Scurry		167.3	269.2	FM 1142 north – Polar	
Scurry		168.9	271.8	Bus. US 84 east / FM 1611	Interchange
Scurry	Snyder	172.8	278.1	SH 208 to SH 350 / Huffman Avenue – Snyder, Big Spring, Western Texas College	Interchange
Scurry	Snyder	174.6	281.0	FM 1673 (Avenue E)	Interchange
Scurry	Snyder	177.5	285.7	US 180 to SH 208 south – Roby, Lamesa	Interchange
Scurry		178.6	287.4	Bus. US 84 west	Interchange
Scurry		181.9	292.7	FM 1673 north – Price Daniel Unit	
Scurry		184.4	296.8	Bus. US 84 east – Hermleigh	
Scurry		186.9	300.8	FM 644 – Loraine	
Scurry		187.3	301.4	Bus. US 84 west – Hermleigh	
Scurry		189.6	305.1	FM 1606 – Dunn	
Scurry		191.9	308.8	FM 1613 north / County Road 4137 – Pyron	
Mitchell	No major junctions				
Nolan		197.4	317.7	FM 1982 west / County Road 111 – Buford	
Nolan		203.9	328.1	Bus. US 84 east – Roscoe	
Nolan	Roscoe	204.6	329.3	FM 608	
Nolan		205.5	330.7	Bus. US 84 west – Roscoe	Interchange
Nolan		206.6	332.5	I-20 west – El Paso	West end of I-20 overlap; no eastbound entrance; US 84 west follows exit 238A
see I-20
Taylor	Tye–Abilene line	247.1	397.7	I-20 east / I-20 BL – Fort Worth	East end of I-20 overlap; west end of I-20 Bus. overlap; no westbound entrance; US 84 east follows exit 279
Taylor	Abilene	249.3	401.2	FM 3438 – Dyess AFB	Interchange
Taylor	Abilene	250.8	403.6	I-20 BL east (South 1st Street) / US 83 north / US 277 north – Anson	Interchange; east end of I-20 Bus. overlap; west end of US 83 / US 277 overlap
Taylor	see US 83				
Taylor		267.5	430.5	US 83 south – Tuscola, Winters, Ballinger	East end of US 83 overlap
Taylor		269.3	433.4	FM 613 north – Tuscola, Buffalo Gap	
Taylor		271.4	436.8	FM 614 – Ovalo, Rogers	
Taylor	Lawn	274.2	441.3	FM 604 – Bradshaw, Oplin, Clyde	
Coleman	Novice	284.8	458.3	FM 702 east to FM 1770 west – Winters	
Coleman	Novice	288.5	464.3	FM 702 west to FM 1770 west – Winters	
Coleman	Coleman	301.8	485.7	US 283 north / SH 206 north – Baird, Cross Plains, Cisco	West end of US 283 / SH 206 overlap
Coleman	Coleman	302.5	486.8	SH 206 south – Valera, Ballinger	East end of SH 206 overlap
Coleman	Coleman	302.9	487.5	FM 3425 north to SH 206 north – Airport, Cross Plains, Cisco	
Coleman	Coleman	304.5	490.0	SH 153 west – Winters, Wingate	
Coleman		305.5	491.7	FM 568 – Grosvenor	
Coleman	Santa Anna	311.7	501.6	US 67 south – Ballinger, San Angelo	West end of US 67 overlap
see US 67
Brown	Early	334.2	537.8	US 183 north – Rising Star, Cisco, Airport	West end of US 183 overlap
Brown	Early	335.4	539.8	US 67 north / US 377 north – Fort Worth, Stephenville, Comanche	East end of US 67 / US 377 overlap
Brown	Early	337.1	542.5	FM 2126 south to FM 45 south – Camp Bowie Training Center, Richland Springs	
Brown	Zephyr	344.9	555.1	FM 1467 north – Blanket	
Brown	Zephyr	345.4	555.9	FM 590 east – Comanche	
Brown	Zephyr	345.6	556.2	FM 218 east – Priddy, Pottsville, Hamilton	
Mills	Mullin	356.8	574.2	FM 573 south – Ridge	West end of FM 573 overlap
Mills	Mullin	357.0	574.5	FM 573 north – Comanche	East end of FM 573 overlap
Mills	Bozar	361.6	581.9	FM 1029 north	
Mills	Goldthwaite	364.6	586.8	SH 16 north – Priddy, Comanche	West end of SH 16 overlap
Mills	Goldthwaite	365.8	588.7	US 183 south / SH 16 south – San Saba, Lampasas, Austin	East end of US 183 / SH 16 overlap
Mills	Goldthwaite	366.8	590.3	Loop 15 west to SH 16 south / US 183 south – San Saba, Lampasas, Austin	
Mills	Goldthwaite	367.4	591.3	FM 2005 east – Hamilton	
Mills	Star	381.3	613.6	FM 1047 – Historical Museum	
Hamilton		388.2	624.7	FM 2414 north	
Hamilton	Evant	391.1	629.4	US 281 – Hamilton, Lampasas	Interchange
Coryell	Evant	391.6	630.2	FM 183 east to FM 1690 south – South Purmela, Izoro	
Coryell	South Purmela	401.9	646.8	FM 183 west / FM 932 north to FM 1690 south – Hamilton, Evant, Izoro	
Coryell		406.3	653.9	FM 930 north – Levita	
Coryell	Gatesville	413.5	665.5	FM 116 south – Copperas Cove	
Coryell	Gatesville	414.4	666.9	FM 2412 west – Levita	
Coryell	Gatesville	415.8	669.2	Bus. SH 36 west (Lutterloh Avenue) to FM 215 north – Hamilton, Mosheim	West end of Bus. SH 36 overlap
Coryell	Gatesville	416.5	670.3	Bus. SH 36 east to FM 107 east – Temple, Moody, Marlin	East end of Bus. SH 36 overlap
Coryell	Gatesville	417.5	671.9	SH 36 – Hamilton, Temple	interchange
Coryell		424.0	682.4	FM 1829 south to FM 107 – Mound	
Coryell		428.1	689.0	FM 185 north – Osage	
Coryell	Oglesby	429.7	691.5	FM 1996 south – Mother Neff State Park, Moody	
McLennan		432.7	696.4	FM 938 north – Osage	
McLennan	McGregor	435.9	701.5	SH 317 – Crawford, Valley Mills, Moody, Belton	
McLennan	South Bosque	439.9	708.0	FM 2188 south (Cotton Belt Parkway) to FM 2416 east – Spring Valley	
McLennan	South Bosque	443.5	713.7	FM 2837 east (Old Lorena Road) / Speegleville Road – Lorena	
McLennan	South Bosque	444.0	714.5	Frontage Road	interchange
McLennan	Woodway	445.0	716.2	Bush Drive	eastbound access only
McLennan	Woodway	445.7	717.3	Wickson Road	at-grade intersection; west end of freeway; no access across US 84
McLennan	Woodway	446.1	717.9	Ritchie Road	
McLennan	Woodway	447.0	719.4	Poage Drive	No direct eastbound exit (signed at Ritchie Road)
McLennan	Woodway	447.1	719.5	FM 1695 (Hewitt Drive) to Estates Drive / FM 3223 – Hewitt	
McLennan	Woodway	448.2	721.3	Old McGregor Road	Westbound exit and eastbound entrance; no access across US 84
McLennan	Woodway	448.5	721.8	Texas Central Parkway / Santa Fe Drive	
McLennan	Woodway	449.1	722.8	Londonderry Drive	Westbound access only
McLennan	Waco	449.5	723.4	SH 6 / Loop 340 – Robinson, Meridian	access to Ascension Providence
McLennan	Waco	450.2	724.5	Spur 298 (Franklin Avenue)	interchange; east end of freeway; eastbound exit and westbound entrance
McLennan	Waco	451.4	726.5	Loop 396 (North Valley Mills Drive)	
McLennan	Waco	453.4	729.7	Loop 2 south (North 18th Street)	
McLennan	Waco	454.5	731.4	FM 1637 west (North 4th Street) – Cameron Park Zoo	
McLennan	Waco	454.7– 454.8	731.8– 731.9	Waco Drive Bridge over Brazos River	
McLennan	Waco	456.0	733.9	FM 933 north (Clifton Street) – Whitney	
McLennan	Waco	456.1	734.0	Bus. US 77	Interchange
McLennan	Bellmead	456.7	735.0	I-35 / US 77 – Fort Worth, Dallas, Austin	I-35 exit 338A
McLennan	Bellmead	457.1	735.6	Spur 299 west	
McLennan	Bellmead	458.3	737.6	Loop 340 / FM 2418 north	interchange
McLennan		462.5	744.3	SH 31 east – Hubbard, Corsicana	Interchange
McLennan		466.0	750.0	FM 1330 north to SH 31 east – Axtell	
McLennan		470.6	757.4	FM 939 to SH 31 east – Mart	
Limestone	Prairie Hill	476.1	766.2	FM 73 east – Coolidge	
Limestone	Prairie Hill	476.5	766.9	FM 339 south – Kosse	West end of FM 339 overlap
Limestone	Prairie Hill	476.8	767.3	FM 339 north – Mount Calm	East end of FM 339 overlap
Limestone		478.6	770.2	FM 1245 south – Groesbeck	
Limestone		486.8	783.4	FM 2310 north – Coolidge	
Limestone		488.5	786.2	FM 2681 south – Booker T. Washington Park, Lake Mexia	
Limestone		489.2	787.3	FM 2705 south – Confederate Reunion Grounds State Historic Site	
Limestone		490.3	789.1	FM 2838 north – Mexia State Supported Living Center	
Limestone	Mexia	494.2	795.3	SH 14 (Martin Luther King Jr. Highway) – Corsicana, Groesbeck, Wortham	
Limestone	Mexia	494.4	795.7	SH 171 north / Echols Street	
Limestone	Mexia	495.5	797.4	FM 1365 south (Bailey Street) – Point Enterprise	
Freestone	Cotton Gin	502.1	808.1	FM 1366 north	
Freestone		503.0	809.5	FM 2777 south	
Freestone	Teague	505.8	814.0	FM 80 north – Streetman, Kirvin	West end of FM 80 overlap
Freestone	Teague	507.4	816.6	FM 1367	
Freestone	Teague	507.5	816.7	Bus. US 84 east / FM 80 south / FM 1365 south / FM 1367 north – Donie	east end of FM 80 overlap
Freestone	Teague	508.4	818.2	Bus. US 84 west to FM 80 south / FM 1451 south / SH 179 east – Donie, Dew	
Freestone	Teague	508.7	818.7	FM 553 south to SH 179 – Dew	
Freestone	Fairfield	516.1	830.6	I-45 – Dallas, Houston	I-45 exit 197
Freestone	Fairfield	517.1	832.2	FM 27 west – Wortham, Coolidge	Access to Freestone Medical Center
Freestone	Fairfield	517.3	832.5	SH 75 – Streetman, Buffalo, Dew	Former US 75
Freestone	Fairfield	517.8	833.3	FM 488 north to US 287 – Richland Chambers Reservoir	
Freestone	Fairfield	518.8	834.9	FM 1580 south	
Freestone	Turlington	524.2	843.6	FM 1364 north	
Freestone	Red Lake	530.4	853.6	FM 489 – Dew	
Freestone		539.7	868.6	US 79 south – Oakwood, Buffalo, Austin	West end of US 79 overlap
Anderson		541.7	871.8	SH 294 east – Elkhart, Alto	
Anderson	Tucker	544.6	876.4	FM 645 north – Tennessee Colony	interchange under construction
Anderson	Palestine	550.8	886.4	FM 1990 south (Knox Street)	
Anderson	Palestine	551.1	886.9	Loop 256	
Anderson	Palestine	551.6	887.7	US 79 north / FM 2394 west (Court Drive) to US 287 north / SH 19 north – Jacksonville, Tyler, Corsicana, Athens	East end of US 79 overlap
Anderson	Palestine	552.5	889.2	US 287 north (West Spring Street) – Corsicana, Athens	West end of US 287 overlap
Anderson	Palestine	553.0	890.0	Loop 127 east (Avenue A) / FM 322 south (South Sycamore Street)	
Anderson	Palestine	553.3	890.5	SH 19 north (North Church Street) – Athens, Corsicana	West end of SH 19 overlap
Anderson	Palestine	553.6	890.9	US 287 south / SH 19 south (Crockett Road) – Crockett, Huntsville, Corrigan	East end of US 287 / SH 19 overlap
Anderson	Palestine	554.7	892.7	Loop 256 – Jacksonville, Tyler, Crockett	
Anderson		554.8	892.9	FM 323 south – Swanson Hill, Alderbranch	
Anderson		555.9	894.6	FM 1137 north	
Anderson		557.0	896.4	PR 70 – Texas State Railroad State Historical Park, Palestine Depot, Palestine Park	
Anderson		559.2	899.9	FM 3266 north	
Cherokee		570.0	917.3	FM 747 north – Pierces Chapel	
Cherokee	Maydelle	574.0	923.8	FM 2138 north – Jacksonville	
Cherokee	Oakland	578.9	931.6	FM 347 north – Dialville, Jacksonville	
Cherokee	Rusk	580.5	934.2	PR 76 – Texas State Railroad, Rusk Depot, Rusk Park	
Cherokee	Rusk	581.3	935.5	FM 1248 south – Rusk Park	
Cherokee	Rusk	582.2	937.0	FM 343 to US 69	
Cherokee	Rusk	583.3	938.7	Loop 62 / FM 23 south / FM 752 south (Main Street) – Alto	west end of SH 110 overlap
Cherokee	Rusk	583.8	939.5	US 69 – Jacksonville, Tyler, Dallas, Alto, Lufkin	Access to Rusk State Hospital
Cherokee	Rusk	583.9	939.7	FM 768 north – Gallatin	
Cherokee	Rusk	584.8	941.1	SH 110 north – Ponta, New Summerfield, Tyler	east end of SH 110 overlap
Cherokee		592.5	953.5	FM 2962 south	
Rusk	Reklaw	594.6	956.9	SH 204 – Jacksonville, Ponta, Cushing, Nacogdoches	
Rusk	Reklaw	595.3	958.0	FM 839 north – Lake Striker, New Salem	
Rusk		602.4	969.5	FM 2753 north – Glenfawn, Anadarko	
Rusk		604.3	972.5	FM 225 – Laneville, Henderson, Cushing	
Rusk	Mount Enterprise	612.2	985.2	FM 3055 south	
Rusk	Mount Enterprise	613.1	986.7	US 259 – Henderson, Kilgore, Nacogdoches	
Rusk	Concord	618.5	995.4	FM 95 – Minden, Garrison	
Rusk	Caledonia	622.2	1,001.3	FM 1971 to FM 95 – Lake Murvaul, Clayton, Garrison	
Shelby		627.8	1,010.3	FM 1970 south	West end of FM 1970 overlap
Shelby	Timpson	628.3	1,011.2	FM 1970 north	East end of FM 1970 overlap
Shelby	Timpson	629.6	1,013.2	US 59 south – Nacogdoches, Lufkin, Houston	West end of US 59 overlap; future I-69 south
Shelby	see US 59				
Shelby	Tenaha	640.4	1,030.6	Future I-69 south / Future I-369 north / US 59 north / US 96 south – Texarkana, Marshall, Beaumont, Jasper	Interchange; east end of US 59 overlap. West end Of Future I-69 overlap. US 59 To the south will be upgraded to I-69. US 59 North will be I-369.
Shelby		641.2	1,031.9	FM 2669 south	
Shelby	Paxton	644.6	1,037.4	FM 699 – Carthage, Center	
Shelby		647.3	1,041.7	FM 3343 south	
Shelby	Joaquin	651.1	1,047.8	FM 2428 south	
Shelby	Joaquin	652.4	1,049.9	SH 7 west – Center, Nacogdoches	
Shelby	Haslam	653.1	1,051.1	FM 3174 north	
Shelby	Haslam	653.9	1,052.4	FM 2787 south to FM 139 south – Toledo Bend Reservoir, Huxley	
Shelby		654.5	1,053.3	US 84 east (Future I-69 north) – Logansport, Mansfield	Louisiana state line
1.000 mi = 1.609 km; 1.000 km = 0.621 mi: Concurrency terminus; Incomplete access
