= O'Donnell Independent School District =

Public school district in O'Donnell, Texas

Coordinates: 32.9678°N 101.8287°W

O'Donnell Independent School District was a public school district based in O'Donnell, Texas (USA). Located in Lynn County, portions of the district extend into Dawson and Terry counties.

In 2009, the school district was rated "academically acceptable" by the Texas Education Agency.

== Schools ==
- O'Donnell High School
- O'Donnell Elementary School

== Special programs ==
=== Athletics ===
O'Donnell High School plays six-man football.
