= Tahoka Independent School District =

School district in Texas

The Tahoka Independent School District is a public school district based in Tahoka, Texas (United States). Located in Lynn County, the district extends into a small portion of Terry County.

The history of Tahoka ISD dates back to the early 1900s. In 1903, Tahoka School District No. 2 was created to serve the southern part of Lynn County. The district expanded through a series of consolidations with smaller schools. On September 26, 1940, high school students from Edith, Midway, New Lynn, Dixie, Three Lakes, and Grassland were sent to Tahoka. In 1947, the Edith School District consolidated with Tahoka, along with Three Lakes and Westpoint. The final two consolidations were Midway in 1949 and Grassland in 1957.

In 2009, the school district was rated "recognized" by the Texas Education Agency.

== Schools ==
- Tahoka High School
- Tahoka Middle School
- Tahoka Elementary School

== Notable alumni ==
- E L Short (Class of 1943), member of both houses of the Texas State Legislature from Tahoka
