= Shallow water =

Shallow water may refer to:

- Waves and shallow water
  - Shallow water equations
- Shallow water marine environment
- Shallow Water (album)
- Shallow Water, Kansas, unincorporated community in the United States
- Shallow Water (film)
