= O'Donnell, Texas =

City in Lynn and Dawson counties in Texas, United States

- City
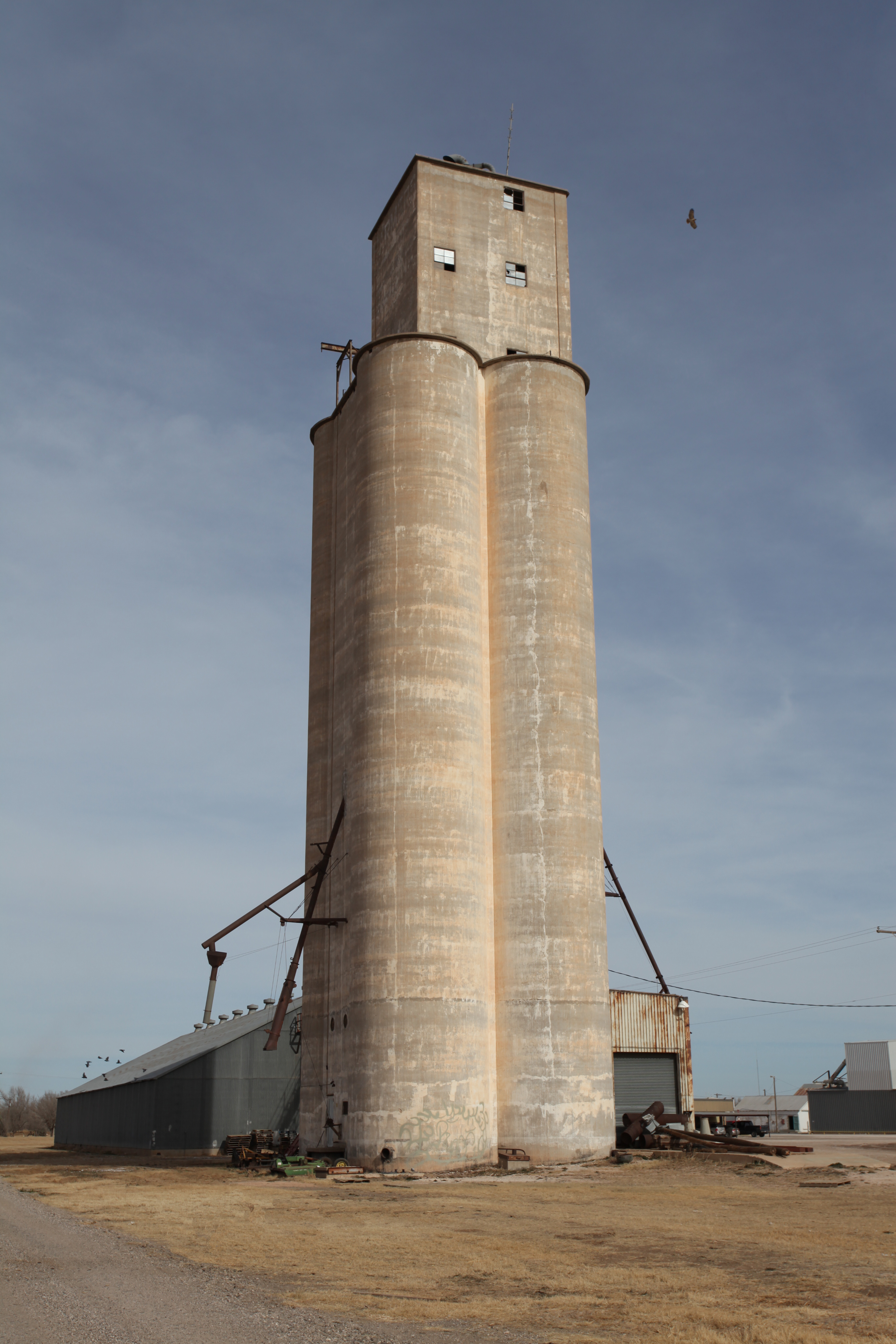
- Grain elevator in O'Donnell

- Location of O'Donnell in Texas
- Coordinates: 32°57′49″N 101°49′58″W
- Country: United States
- State: Texas
- Counties: Lynn, Dawson
- Region: Llano Estacado
- Established: 1910

Area
  - Total: 0.86 sq mi (2.23 km^{2})
  - Land: 0.86 sq mi (2.23 km^{2})
  - Water: 0 sq mi (0.00 km^{2})
- Elevation: 3,045 ft (928 m)

Population (2020)
  - Total: 704
  - Density: 818/sq mi (316/km^{2})
- Time zone: UTC-6 (CST)
- ZIP code: 79351
- Area code: 806
- FIPS code: 48-53436
- Website: odonnell.texas.gov

O'Donnell is a West Texas city that lies primarily in Lynn County, with a small portion extending south into Dawson County, Texas, United States. Its population was 704 at the 2020 census. The Lynn county portion of O'Donnell is part of the Lubbock Metropolitan area.

== History ==
O'Donnell was settled in 1910 and named for Tom J. O'Donnell, a railroad promoter. O'Donnell was a railroad-created town, founded in anticipation that the Pecos and Northern Texas Railway would lay tracks through the area.

A branch of the Pecos and Northern Texas Railway was constructed from Slaton to Lamesa in 1910. The rails were abandoned and removed in 1999. In 2016, a controversy arose when the school was reported for having the ten commandments on its wall; when forced to take it down, the students came together and wrote Bible verses on sticky notes and posted them on the wall.

== Geography ==
O'Donnell is on the High Plains of the Llano Estacado at 32°57′49″N 101°49′58″W (32.9637085 –101.8326542). U.S. Highway 87 passes just northwest of the city limits, leading southwest 17 miles (27 km) to Lamesa and north 45 miles (72 km) to Lubbock.

According to the United States Census Bureau, O'Donnell has an area of 0.85 square miles (2.2 km^{2}), all land.

== Demographics ==
Historical population
Census	Pop.	Note	%±
1930	1,026		—
1940	1,147		11.8%
1950	1,473		28.4%
1960	1,356		−7.9%
1970	1,148		−15.3%
1980	1,200		4.5%
1990	1,102		−8.2%
2000	1,011		−8.3%
2010	831		−17.8%
2020	704		−15.3%
U.S. Decennial Census

=== 2020 census ===
As of the 2020 census, O'Donnell had 704 people, 285 households, and 252 families residing in the city, and the median age was 39.4 years.

26.3% of residents were under the age of 18 and 18.8% of residents were 65 years of age or older. For every 100 females there were 97.8 males, and for every 100 females age 18 and over there were 98.9 males age 18 and over.

0.0% of residents lived in urban areas, while 100.0% lived in rural areas.

Of the 285 households in O'Donnell, 39.6% had children under the age of 18 living in them, 47.0% were married-couple households, 18.9% were households with a male householder and no spouse or partner present, and 25.3% were households with a female householder and no spouse or partner present. About 21.4% of all households were made up of individuals and 11.9% had someone living alone who was 65 years of age or older.

There were 338 housing units, of which 15.7% were vacant. The homeowner vacancy rate was 0.0% and the rental vacancy rate was 8.4%.

Racial composition as of the 2020 census
Race	Number	Percent
White	469	66.6%
Black or African American	5	0.7%
American Indian and Alaska Native	7	1.0%
Asian	0	0.0%
Native Hawaiian and Other Pacific Islander	0	0.0%
Some other race	111	15.8%
Two or more races	112	15.9%
Hispanic or Latino (of any race)	474	67.3%

=== 2010 census ===
As of the 2010 United States census, O'Donnell had 831 people, a 17.8% reduction from the 2000 US Census. The population resided in 315 households, of which 237 were identified as family households. The racial makeup of the city was 73.4% White, 1.2% African American, 0.6% Native American, 0.4% Asian, 20.3% from other races, and 4.1% from two or more races. Hispanics or Latinos of any race were 62.8% of the population.

In the city, the age distribution was 31.2% under 18, 52.0% from 18 to 64, and 16.8% who were 65 or older. The median age was 38.5 years.

The median income for a household in the city was $26,103, and for a family was $30,833. Males had a median income of $26,193 versus $15,917 for females. The per capita income for the city was $12,924. About 24.4% of families and 24.8% of the population were below the poverty line, including 31.1% of those under age 18 and 15.0% of those age 65 or over.

== Education ==
O'Donnell is served by the O'Donnell Independent School District and is home to the O'Donnell High School Eagles.

== Notable people ==
- Dan Blocker, was born in DeKalb, Texas, and moved with his parents to O'Donnell shortly after his birth. He is best known for playing Hoss Cartwright on the NBC television series Bonanza. The O'Donnell Heritage Museum has a room which features Blocker memorabilia
- Phil Hardberger, a former mayor of San Antonio, grew up in O'Donnell. His parents, Homer Reeves Hardberger and the former Bess Scott, are buried in O'Donnell

== Gallery ==
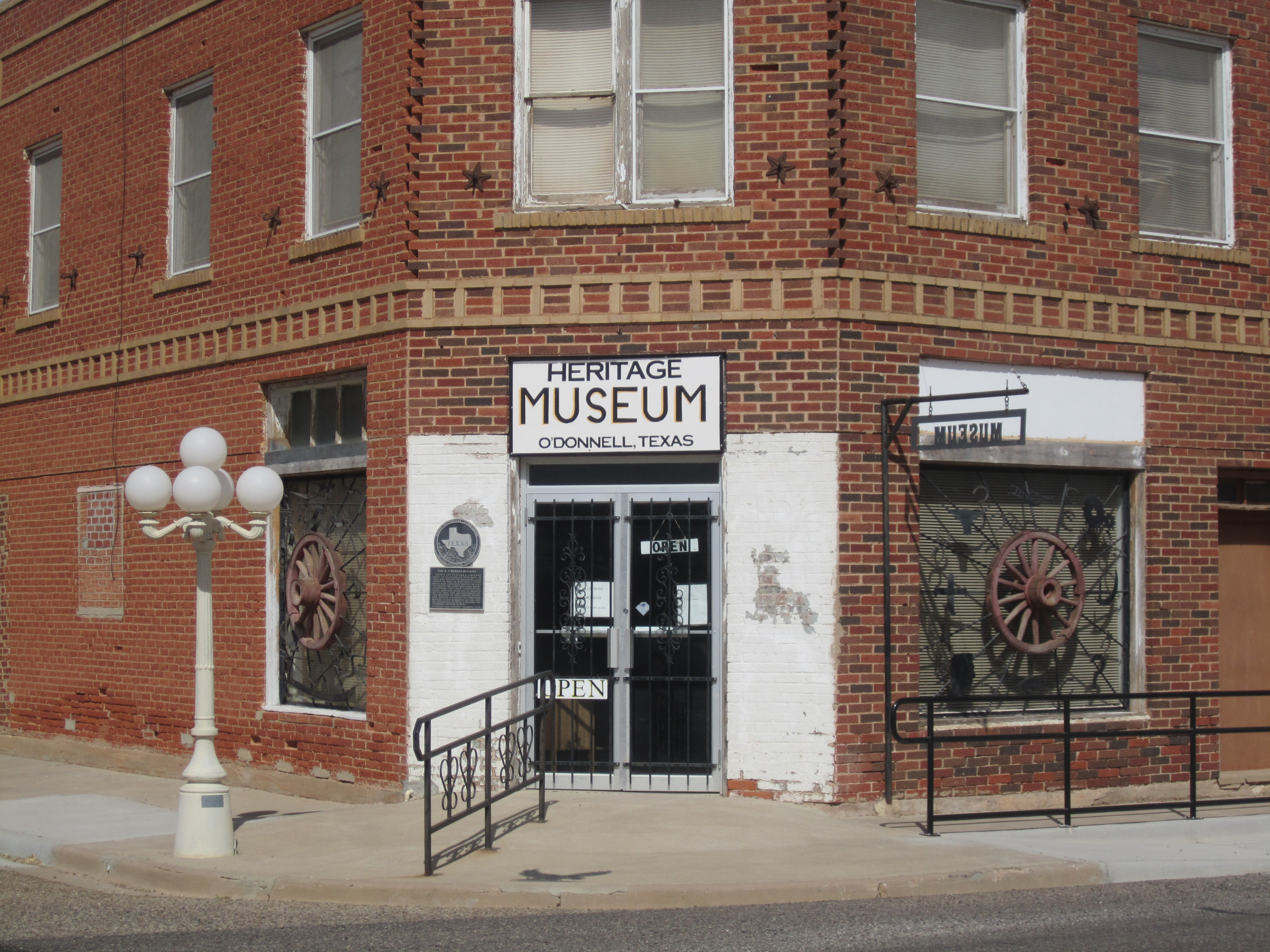
O'Donnell Heritage Museum at the intersection of Doak and Eighth streets

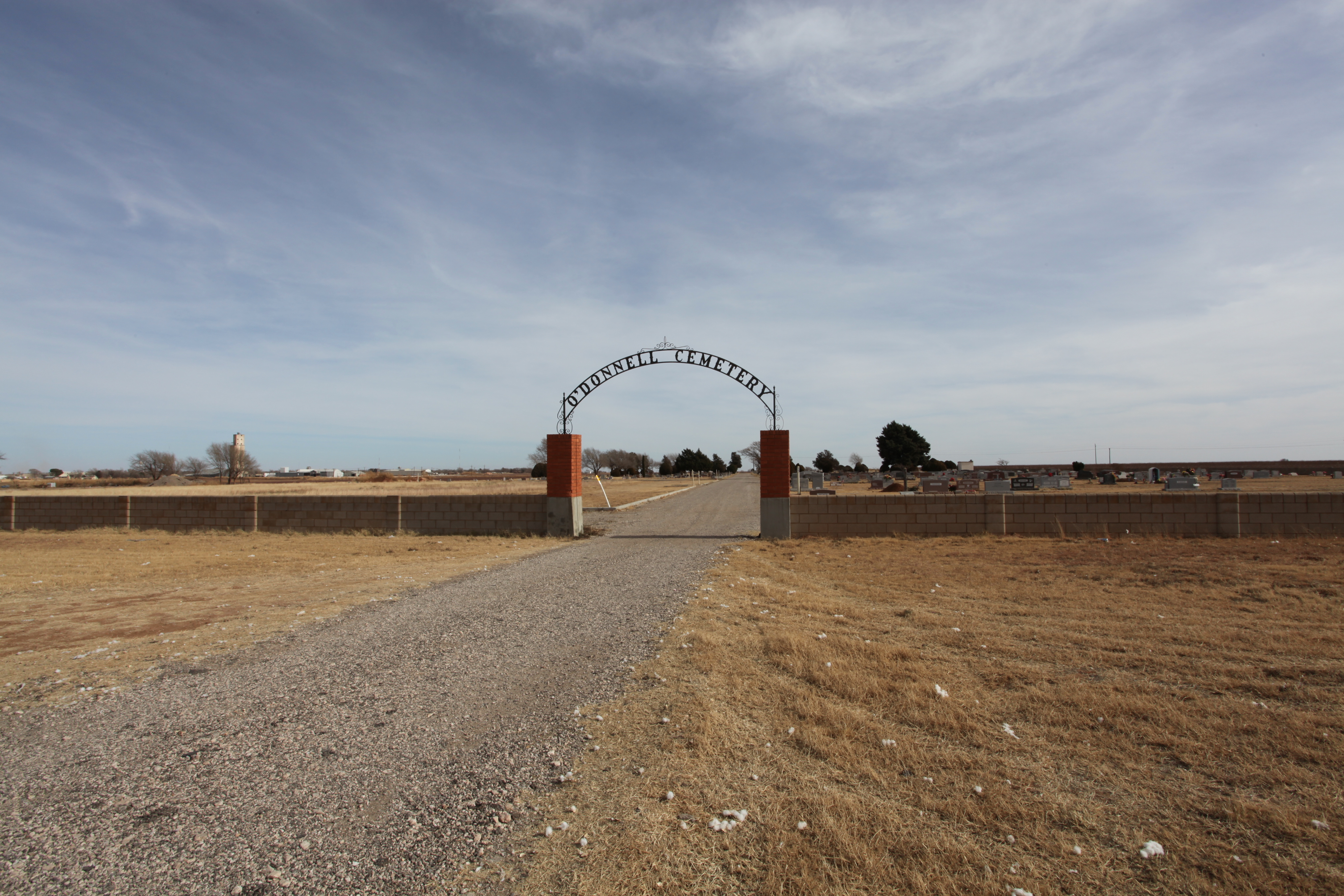
O'Donnell Cemetery

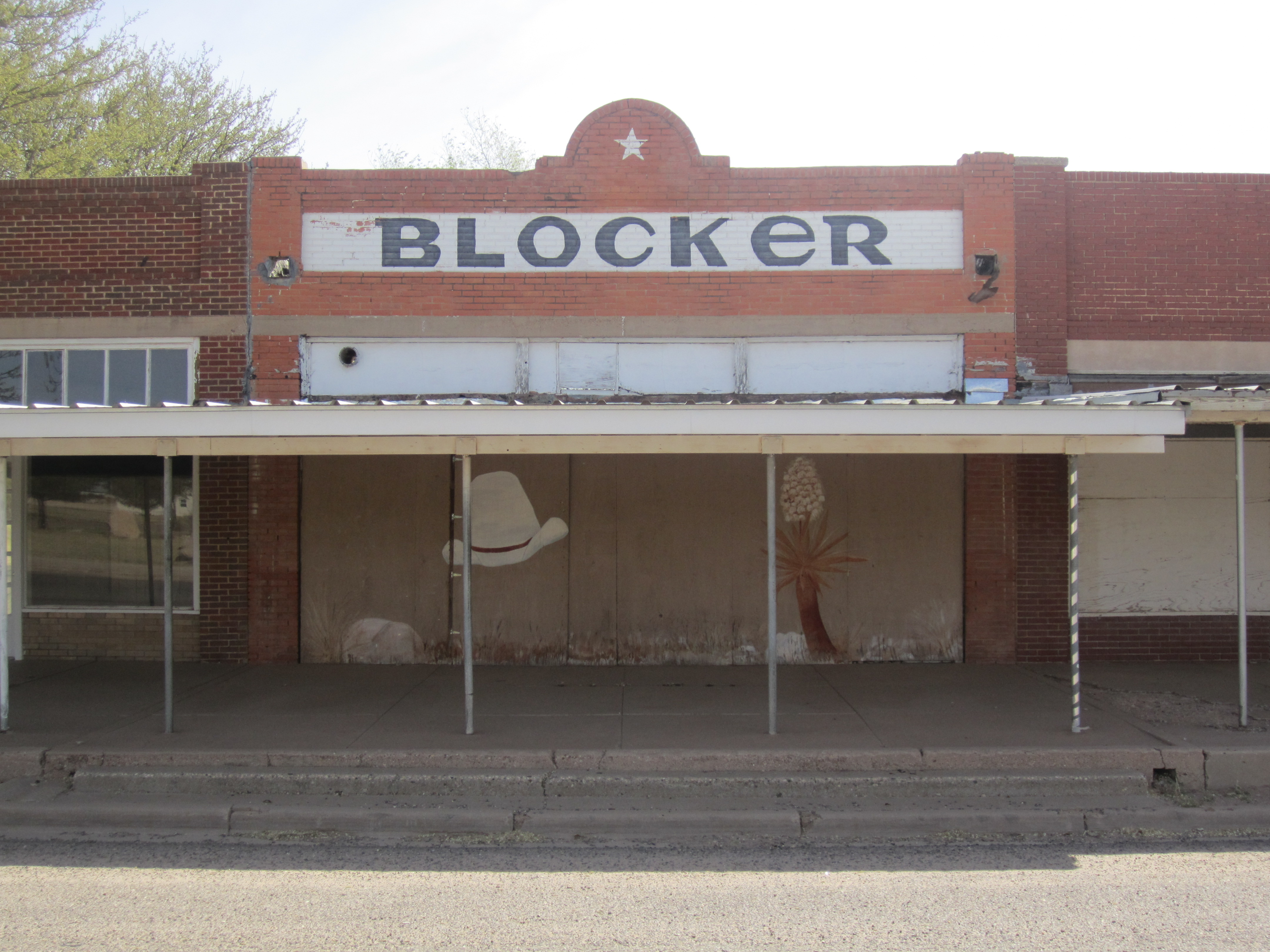
The former Blocker Store in downtown O'Donnell

== See also ==
- List of municipalities in Texas
- Llano Estacado
- West Texas
