= New Home, Texas =

- City
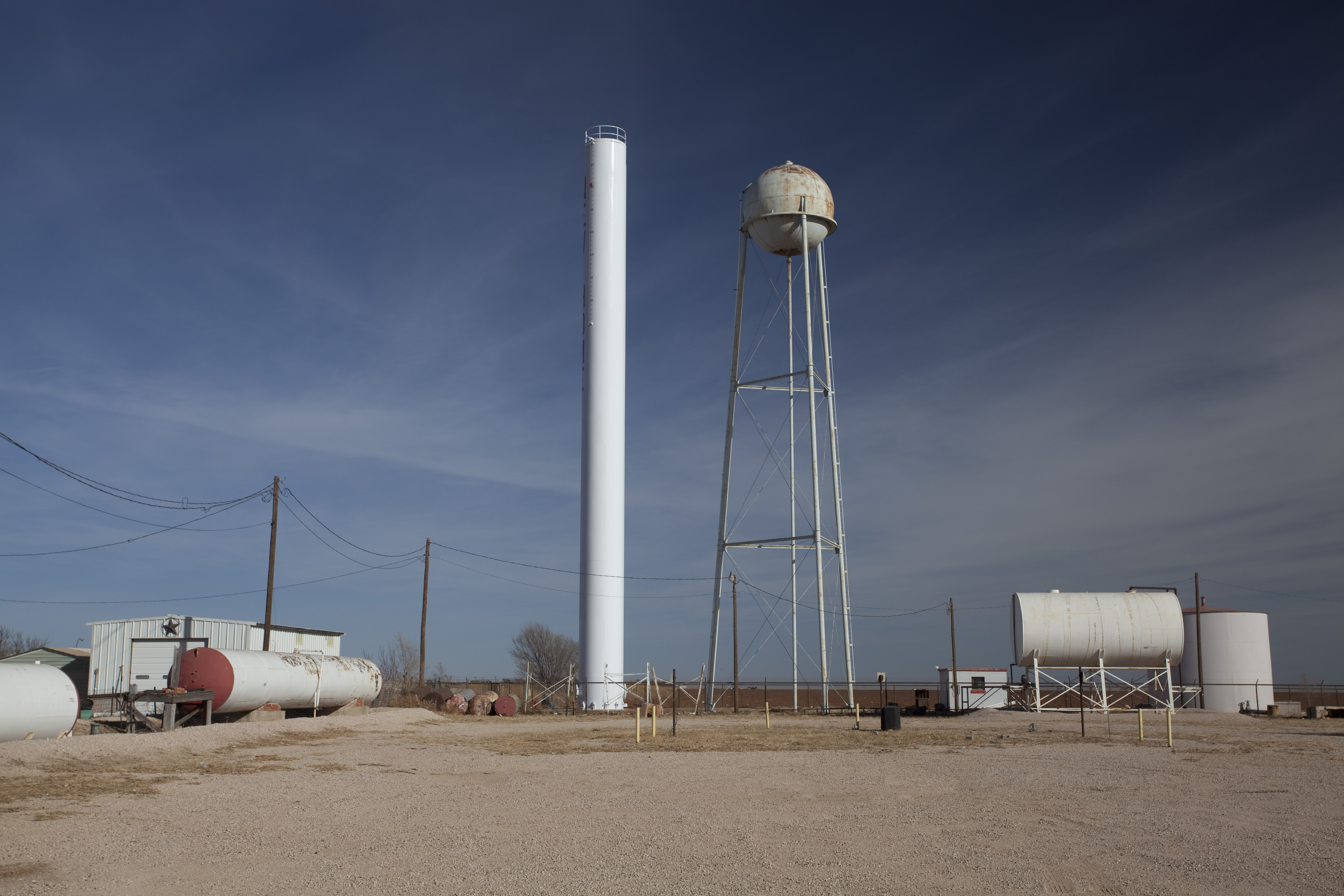
- Water towers and other public works.

- Location of New Home in Texas
- Coordinates: 33°19′35″N 101°54′44″W
- Country: United States
- State: Texas
- County: Lynn
- Region: Llano Estacado
- Established: 1930s

Area
  - Total: 1.00 sq mi (2.59 km^{2})
  - Land: 1.00 sq mi (2.59 km^{2})
  - Water: 0 sq mi (0.00 km^{2})
- Elevation: 3,238 ft (987 m)

Population (2020)
  - Total: 326
  - Density: 326/sq mi (126/km^{2})
- Time zone: UTC-6 (CST)
- ZIP code: 79383
- Area code: 806
- FIPS code: 48-51012
- Website: cityofnewhome.com

New Home is a small city in Lynn County, Texas, United States. The population was 326 at the 2020 census.

== History ==
The agricultural community of New Home was originally part of the Deuce of Hearts Ranch. A portion of the ranch was platted and opened for settlement in the 1890s. The community was initially called Deuce of Hearts but the name was later changed to New Home. Farming began in the area between 1905 and 1910, and an identifiable community had formed there by the 1930s. The economy of New Home has always been closely linked to cotton production and ginning. In 1985, the New Home Co-op Gin processed 12,000 bales of cotton.

== Geography ==
New Home is located on the high plains of the Llano Estacado. According to the United States Census Bureau, the city has a total area of 1.0 square mile (2.6 km^{2}), all of it land.

== Demographics ==
Historical population
Census	Pop.	Note	%±
1970	252		—
1980	274		8.7%
1990	175		−36.1%
2000	320		82.9%
2010	334		4.4%
2020	326		−2.4%
U.S. Decennial Census; 2020 Census

=== 2020 census ===
As of the 2020 census, New Home had a population of 326. The median age was 38.0 years; 23.6% of residents were under the age of 18 and 16.9% of residents were 65 years of age or older. For every 100 females there were 101.2 males, and for every 100 females age 18 and over there were 97.6 males age 18 and over.

0.0% of residents lived in urban areas, while 100.0% lived in rural areas.

There were 121 households in New Home, of which 43.0% had children under the age of 18 living in them. Of all households, 60.3% were married-couple households, 16.5% were households with a male householder and no spouse or partner present, and 18.2% were households with a female householder and no spouse or partner present. About 19.0% of all households were made up of individuals and 9.1% had someone living alone who was 65 years of age or older.

There were 136 housing units, of which 11.0% were vacant. The homeowner vacancy rate was 2.3% and the rental vacancy rate was 0.0%.

Racial composition as of the 2020 census
Race	Number	Percent
White	189	58.0%
Black or African American	3	0.9%
American Indian and Alaska Native	2	0.6%
Asian	0	0.0%
Native Hawaiian and Other Pacific Islander	0	0.0%
Some other race	81	24.8%
Two or more races	51	15.6%
Hispanic or Latino (of any race)	163	50.0%

=== 2000 census ===
As of the 2000 census, there were 320 people, 100 households, and 81 families residing in the city. The population density was 319.2 inhabitants per square mile (123.2/km^{2}). There were 108 housing units at an average density of 107.7 per square mile (41.6/km^{2}).

There were 100 households, out of which 46.0% had children under the age of 18 living with them, 74.0% were married couples living together, 5.0% had a female householder with no husband present, and 19.0% were non-families. 15.0% of all households were made up of individuals, and 8.0% had someone living alone who was 65 years of age or older. The average household size was 3.17 and the average family size was 3.54.

In the city, the population was spread out, with 35.6% under the age of 18, 8.8% from 18 to 24, 29.7% from 25 to 44, 15.0% from 45 to 64, and 10.9% who were 65 years of age or older. The median age was 30 years. For every 100 females, there were 105.1 males. For every 100 females age 18 and over, there were 92.5 males.

The median income for a household in the city was $39,063, and the median income for a family was $42,083. Males had a median income of $26,250 versus $25,417 for females. The per capita income for the city was $15,222. About 5.3% of families and 9.7% of the population were below the poverty line, including 8.7% of those under age 18 and none of those age 65 or over.

== Education ==
The City of New Home is served by the New Home Independent School District.

== See also ==
- Woodrow, Texas
- Slide, Texas
- Close City, Texas
- Llano Estacado
