= New Home Independent School District =

School district in Texas

Coordinates: 33.3295°N 101.9117°W

New Home Independent School District is a public school district based in New Home, Texas (USA).

The district has one school that serves students in grades kindergarten through twelve.

== History ==
By 2018, the district began to receive a population increase as the number of residents in the Lubbock metropolitan area grew.

== Academic achievement ==
In 2009, the school district was rated "academically acceptable" by the Texas Education Agency.

== Special programs ==
=== Athletics ===
Previously the town had a full eleven-man football roster, but switched to six-man football in 1982. New Home still qualified for Class 1A, the smallest bracket of the Texas public high school sports league University Interscholastic League (UIL), in February 2018, when it had 93 students. If a high school reached 104.9 students, it would be required to go to Class 2A and play full eleven-man football. In fall 2018 the district chose to revert to eleven-man football anyway due to a foreseen population increase. As of 2020, New Home is a member of Class 2A across all sports.

== See also ==
- List of school districts in Texas
