= Shallowater Independent School District =

School district in Texas

Coordinates: 33.704°N 102.021°W

Shallowater Independent School District is a public school district based in Shallowater, Texas (USA) that serves students in northwestern Lubbock County.

In addition to Shallowater, the district includes a section of Lubbock.

The district has four schools:

- Shallowater Elementary (grades PK-1)
- Shallowater Intermediate (grades 2-4)
- Shallowater Middle (grades 5-8)
- Shallowater High (grades 9-12)

In 2011, the school district was rated "exemplary" by the Texas Education Agency.

== Chivalry controversy ==
An assignment at Shallowater High School was the subject of controversy in March 2021. "A 'chivalry' assignment given to students at Shallowater High School in Texas instructed girls to 'dress in a feminine manner' to please men, 'walk behind men daintily as if their feet were bound,' and 'not complain or whine.' The public relations director for the high school said the assignment had been given in a historical context, but was removed.
