= Slide, Texas =

- unincorporated community
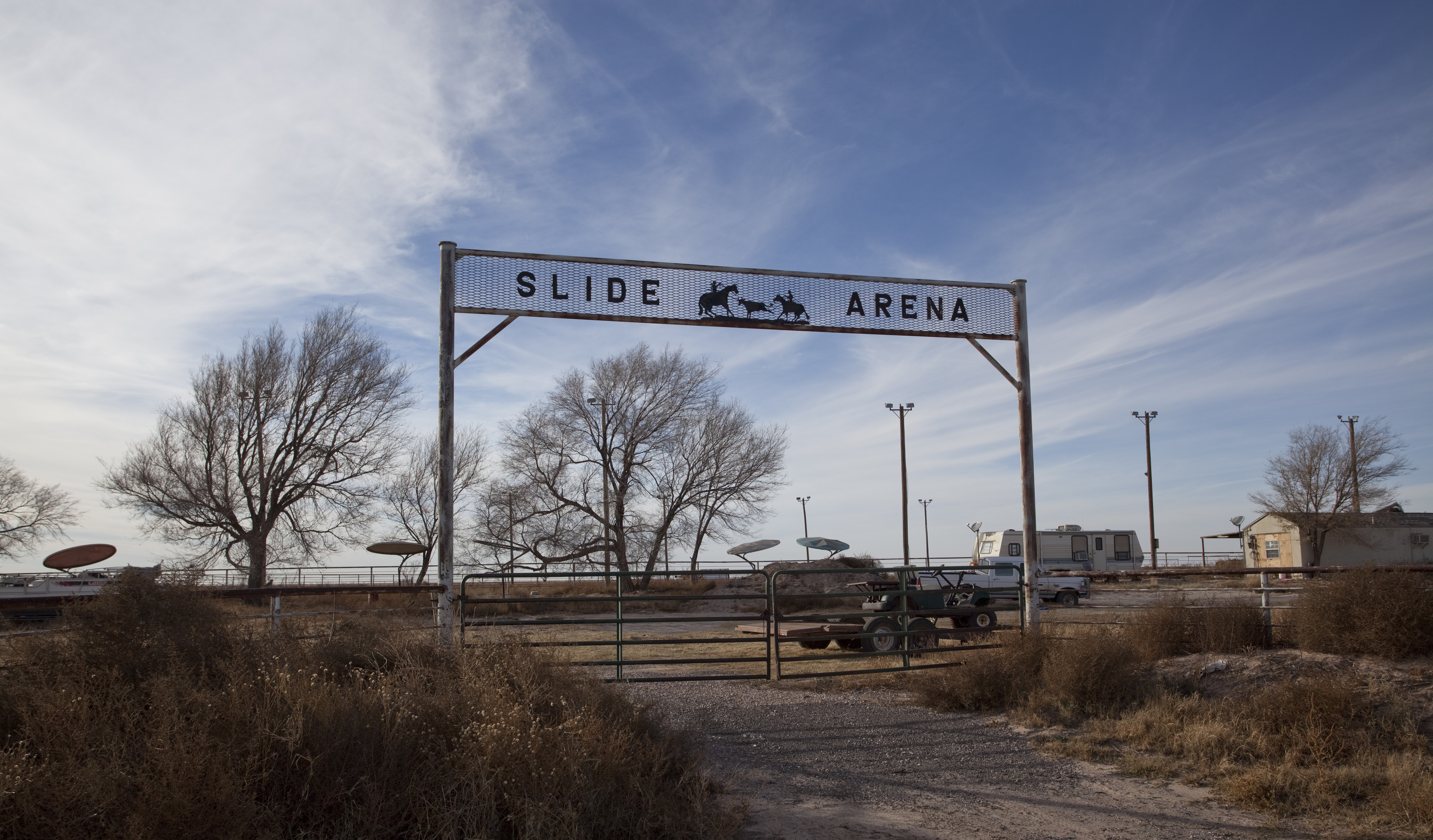
- Slide Arena

- Location within Texas Location within the United States
- Coordinates: 33°24′50″N 101°55′48″W
- Country: United States
- State: Texas
- County: Lubbock
- Physiographic region: Llano Estacado
- Founded: 1890s
- Elevation: 3,255 ft (992 m)

Population (2000)
  - Total: 44
- Time zone: UTC-6 (Central (CST))
  - Summer (DST): UTC-5 (CDT)
- Area code: 806
- Website: Handbook of Texas

Slide is an unincorporated community in Lubbock County, Texas, United States. According to the Handbook of Texas, the community had a population of 44 in 2000. The community is part of the Lubbock metropolitan area.

== Geography ==
Slide is located at the intersection of Farm to Market Roads 1730 and 41, 13 mi (21 km) southwest of Lubbock and 13.5 mi (21.7 km) east of Ropesville in southern Lubbock County.

== Education ==
The original settlers used the lumber from Colorado City to build a school. Today, Slide is served by the Lubbock-Cooper Independent School District.
