= Lynn County, Texas =

County in Texas, United States

- County
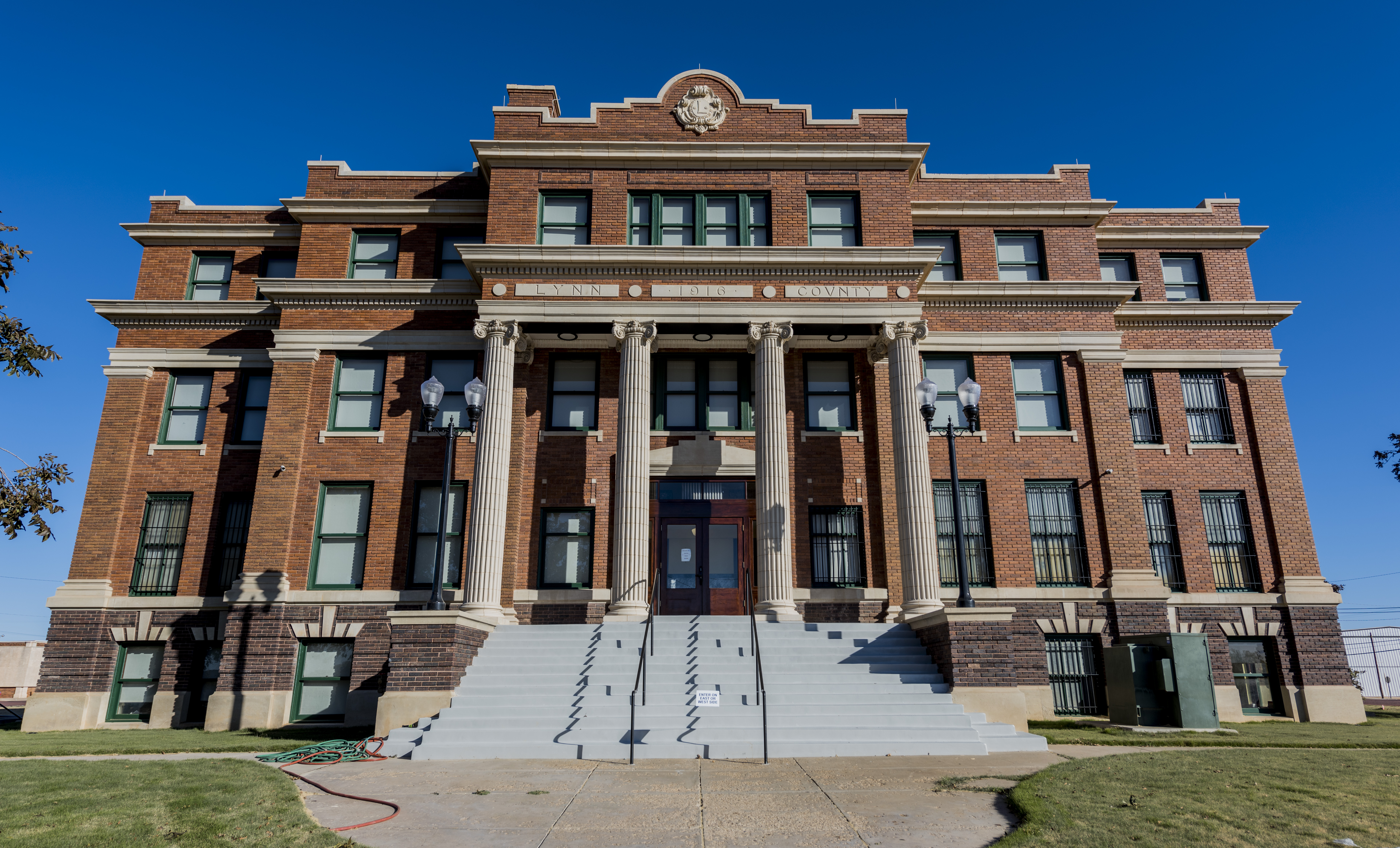
- Lynn County Courthouse in Tahoka

- Location within the U.S. state of Texas
- Coordinates: 33°11′N 101°49′W
- Country: United States
- State: Texas
- Founded: 1903
- Seat: Tahoka
- Largest city: Tahoka

Area
  - Total: 893 sq mi (2,310 km^{2})
  - Land: 892 sq mi (2,310 km^{2})
  - Water: 1.6 sq mi (4.1 km^{2}) 0.2%

Population (2020)
  - Total: 5,596
  - Estimate (2025): 6,017 ▲
  - Density: 6.27/sq mi (2.42/km^{2})
- Time zone: UTC−6 (Central)
  - Summer (DST): UTC−5 (CDT)
- Congressional district: 19th
- Website: www.co.lynn.tx.us

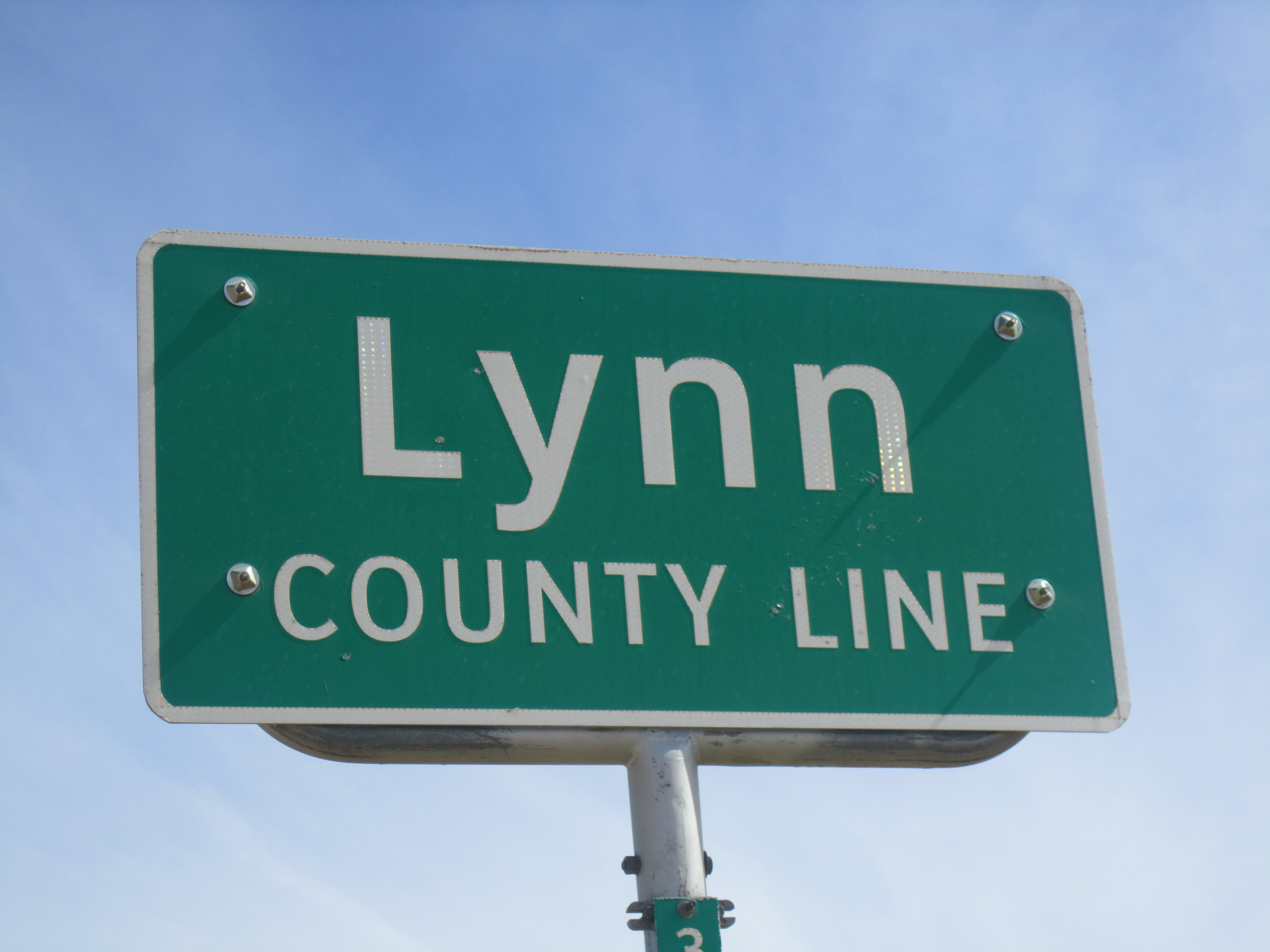

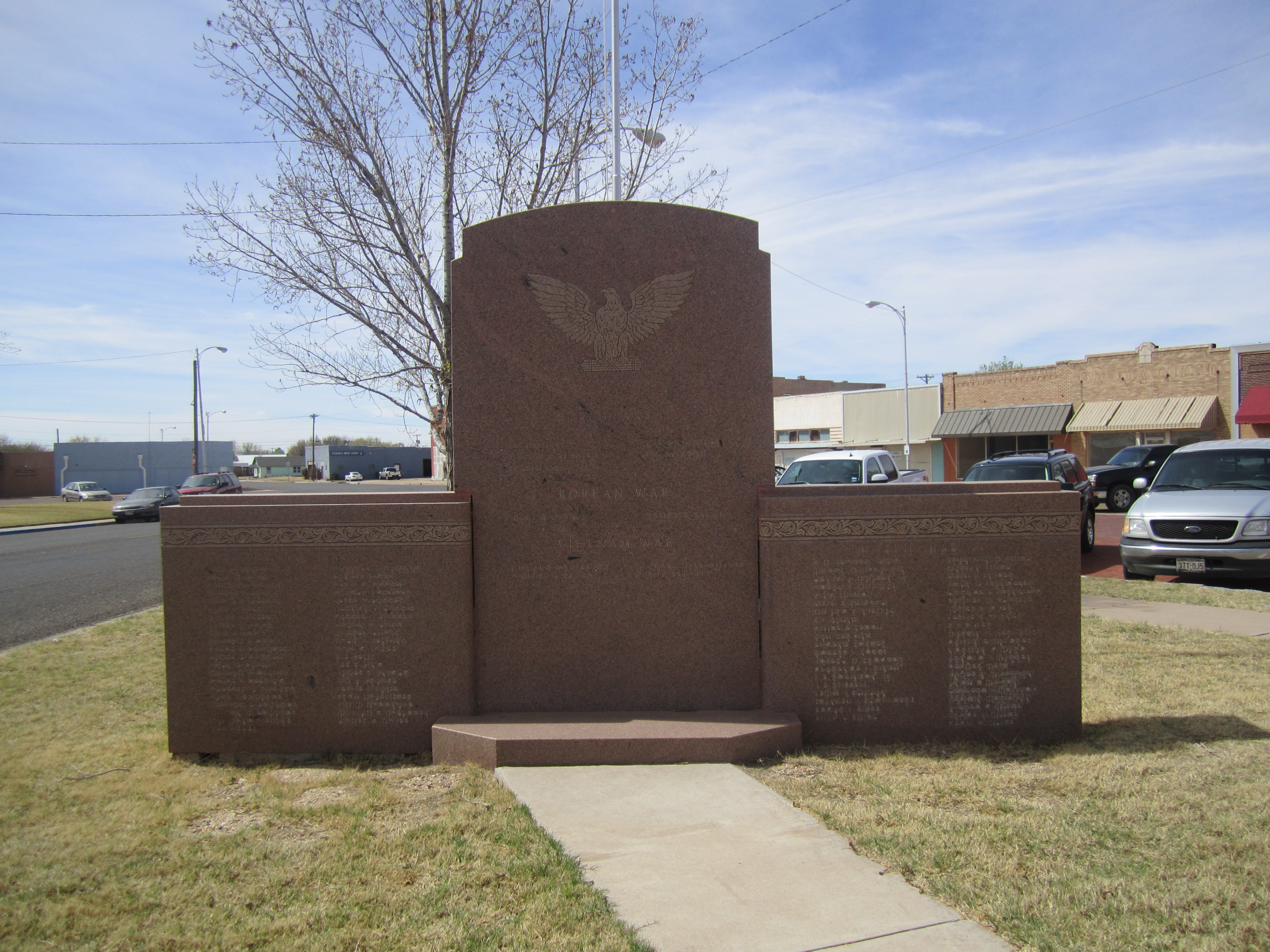
Veterans Monument at Lynn County Courthouse

Lynn County is a county in the U.S. state of Texas. As of the 2020 census, its population was 5,596. Its county seat is Tahoka. The county was created in 1876 and organized in 1903.

Lynn County, along with Crosby and Lubbock Counties, is part of the Lubbock Metropolitan Statistical Area (MSA). The Lubbock MSA and Levelland Micropolitan Statistical Area (μSA), encompassing only Hockley County, form the larger Lubbock–Levelland Combined Statistical Area (CSA).

Lynn County was one of 30 prohibition, or entirely dry, counties in Texas, but is now a moist county.

The county has two historical museums, the O'Donnell Heritage Museum, with a Dan Blocker room in O'Donnell, and the Tahoka Pioneer Museum in Tahoka.

The county is also home to the Lynn County Hospital District that provides medical care to the county and surrounding area.

== History ==
=== Native Americans ===
Apache and Comanche peoples roamed the high plains until various military expeditions of the 19th century pushed them away.

The Red River War of 1874 was a military campaign to drive out the Apaches, Comanches, and Kiowas in Texas. In 1877, the ill-fated Nolan Expedition crossed the county in search of livestock stolen by Comanche renegades. The various Indian tribes had moved on by the time of white settlement due to the depletion of the buffalo herds by hunters.

=== Settlers ===
In the early 1880s, sheep and cattle ranchers began to set up operations in the county. The situation changed as large-scale ranching spread into the county.

W C. Young of Fort Worth and Illinois Irishman Ben Galbraith established the beginnings of the Curry Comb Ranch in the northwest part of Garza County. By 1880, it spilled over into Lynn County. The Square Compass Ranch of Garza County also protruded into Lynn County.

The county remained sparsely settled ranching territory for two decades after 1880. It had no towns; the population was nine in 1880, 24 in 1890, and 17 in 1900. Farmers began to move into the county and invest in corn, grains, and cotton.

=== County established ===
Lynn County was formed in 1876 from Bexar. The county was organized in 1903, with Tahoka becoming the county seat.

New towns were founded during the early years of the 20th century. O'Donnell, named for railroad man Tom J. O'Donnell, was established in 1910 as a speculative venture based on the opening up of new farmlands in southern Lynn and northern Dawson Counties. Wilson, 13 miles (21 km) northeast of Tahoka, was established in 1912 to attract farmers to the newly opened lands of the Dixie Ranch. A large number of Central Texas Germans purchased county lands, thus beginning a small-scale migration of Germans into the county that lasted into the 1950s.

Cotton farming prospered in the early part of the 20th century. Farmers later expanded to wheat and sorghum, plus cattle, sheep, hogs, and poultry, chiefly chickens and turkeys.

Oil was discovered in the county in 1950. By 1983, the total production was 10,612,550 barrels (1,687,261 m^{3}).

== Geography ==
According to the U.S. Census Bureau, the county has an area of 893 square miles (2,310 km^{2}), of which 892 square miles (2,310 km^{2}) is land and 1.6 square miles (4.1 km^{2}) (0.2%) is covered by water.

=== Geographic features ===
- Caprock Escarpment, eastern edge of Lynn County
- Double Mountain Fork Brazos River, begins as a small depression between Draw, Redwine, and Grassland, Texas.
- Double Lakes, northwest of Tahoka
- Guthrie Lake, southwest of Tahoka
- Tahoka Lake, northeast of Tahoka

=== Major highways ===
- U.S. Highway 84
- U.S. Highway 87
- U.S. Highway 380
- Loop 76
- Loop 472

=== Adjacent counties ===
- Lubbock County (north)
- Garza County (east)
- Borden County (southeast)
- Dawson County (south)
- Terry County (west)
- Hockley County (northwest)

== Demographics ==
Historical population
Census	Pop.	Note	%±
1880	9		—
1890	24		166.7%
1900	17		−29.2%
1910	1,713		9,976.5%
1920	4,751		177.3%
1930	12,372		160.4%
1940	11,931		−3.6%
1950	11,030		−7.6%
1960	10,914		−1.1%
1970	9,107		−16.6%
1980	8,605		−5.5%
1990	6,758		−21.5%
2000	6,550		−3.1%
2010	5,915		−9.7%
2020	5,596		−5.4%
2025 (est.)	6,017	▲	7.5%
U.S. Decennial Census; 1850–2010 2010 2020

=== 2020 census ===
As of the 2020 census, the county had a population of 5,596. The median age was 37.8 years. 28.4% of residents were under the age of 18 and 15.9% of residents were 65 years of age or older. For every 100 females there were 105.4 males, and for every 100 females age 18 and over there were 102.2 males age 18 and over.

The racial makeup of the county was 66.5% White, 1.9% Black or African American, 0.6% American Indian and Alaska Native, 0.2% Asian, 0.1% Native Hawaiian and Pacific Islander, 18.9% from some other race, and 11.7% from two or more races. Hispanic or Latino residents of any race comprised 42.0% of the population.

Less than 0.1% of residents lived in urban areas, while 100.0% lived in rural areas.

There were 2,119 households in the county, of which 36.4% had children under the age of 18 living in them. Of all households, 54.6% were married-couple households, 18.6% were households with a male householder and no spouse or partner present, and 21.8% were households with a female householder and no spouse or partner present. About 23.5% of all households were made up of individuals and 11.8% had someone living alone who was 65 years of age or older.

There were 2,527 housing units, of which 16.1% were vacant. Among occupied housing units, 77.9% were owner-occupied and 22.1% were renter-occupied. The homeowner vacancy rate was 1.5% and the rental vacancy rate was 10.3%.

=== Racial and ethnic composition ===
Lynn County, Texas – Racial and ethnic composition Note: the US Census treats Hispanic/Latino as an ethnic category. This table excludes Latinos from the racial categories and assigns them to a separate category. Hispanics/Latinos may be of any race.
Race / Ethnicity (NH = Non-Hispanic)	Pop 2000	Pop 2010	Pop 2020	% 2000	% 2010	% 2020
White alone (NH)	3,377	2,984	2,960	51.56%	50.45%	52.89%
Black or African American alone (NH)	166	113	105	2.53%	1.91%	1.88%
Native American or Alaska Native alone (NH)	37	28	15	0.56%	0.47%	0.27%
Asian alone (NH)	6	8	10	0.09%	0.14%	0.18%
Pacific Islander alone (NH)	0	0	4	0.00%	0.00%	0.07%
Other race alone (NH)	1	5	12	0.02%	0.08%	0.21%
Mixed race or Multiracial (NH)	40	34	138	0.61%	0.57%	2.47%
Hispanic or Latino (any race)	2,923	2,743	2,352	44.63%	46.37%	42.03%
Total	6,550	5,915	5,596	100.00%	100.00%	100.00%

=== 2000 census ===
As of the census of 2000, 6,550 people, 2,354 households, and 1,777 families resided in the county. The population density was 7 people per square mile (2.7 people/km^{2}). The 2,671 housing units averaged 3 units per square mile (1.2/km^{2}). The county's racial makeup was 75.53% White, 2.84% Black or African American, 1.02% Native American, 0.15% Asian, 18.24% from other races, and 2.21% from two or more races. About 44% of the population was Hispanic or Latino of any race.

Of the 2,354 households, 38.90% had children under the age of 18 living with them, 61.00% were married couples living together, 11.10% had a female householder with no husband present, and 24.50% were not families; 23.10% of all households were made up of individuals, and 12.10% had someone living alone who was 65 years of age or older. The average household size was 2.76 and the average family size was 3.25.

In the county, the population was distributed as 31.20% under the age of 18, 7.80% from 18 to 24, 26.00% from 25 to 44, 21.00% from 45 to 64, and 14.00% who were 65 years of age or older. The median age was 35 years. For every 100 females, there were 99.60 males. For every 100 females age 18 and over, there were 93.80 males.

The median income for a household in the county was $26,694, and for a family was $33,146. Males had a median income of $27,972 versus $19,531 for females. The per capita income for the county was $14,090. About 19.30% of families and 22.60% of the population were below the poverty line, including 28.00% of those under age 18 and 24.40% of those age 65 or over.

The county is served by a weekly newspaper, nearby stations KBXJ (FM) and KPET (AM), and the various Lubbock radio and TV stations. KAMZ (FM) and KMMX (FM) are licensed to Tahoka, but have offices and studios in Lubbock and originate few if any programs from Lynn County.

== Communities ==
=== Cities ===
- New Home
- O'Donnell (small part in Dawson County)
- Tahoka (county seat)
- Wilson

=== Unincorporated communities ===
- Grassland
- Wayside

== Notable people ==
- Dan Blocker, actor
- Jerry "Bo" Coleman, radio disc jockey
- Phil Hardberger, politician
- E L Short, former member of both houses of the Texas State Legislature

== Politics ==
Lynn County is located within District 83 of the Texas House of Representatives. Lynn County is located within District 28 of the Texas Senate.

United States presidential election results for Lynn County, Texas
Year	Republican		Democratic		Third party(ies)	
Year	No.	%	No.	%	No.	%
1916	15	4.24%	331	93.50%	8	2.26%
1920	76	11.14%	538	78.89%	68	9.97%
1924	313	20.85%	1,131	75.35%	57	3.80%
1928	1,268	62.49%	754	37.16%	7	0.34%
1932	110	5.37%	1,930	94.24%	8	0.39%
1936	169	7.83%	1,983	91.89%	6	0.28%
1940	255	8.86%	2,618	90.97%	5	0.17%
1944	263	10.55%	1,968	78.94%	262	10.51%
1948	224	8.86%	2,179	86.16%	126	4.98%
1952	1,351	43.29%	1,762	56.46%	8	0.26%
1956	861	32.28%	1,800	67.49%	6	0.22%
1960	953	33.52%	1,872	65.85%	18	0.63%
1964	745	24.59%	2,281	75.28%	4	0.13%
1968	1,005	34.87%	1,333	46.25%	544	18.88%
1972	1,766	71.47%	697	28.21%	8	0.32%
1976	1,166	42.29%	1,575	57.13%	16	0.58%
1980	1,603	55.78%	1,236	43.01%	35	1.22%
1984	1,617	61.48%	1,009	38.37%	4	0.15%
1988	1,279	54.03%	1,086	45.88%	2	0.08%
1992	1,233	50.78%	902	37.15%	293	12.07%
1996	1,151	52.39%	903	41.10%	143	6.51%
2000	1,507	72.31%	562	26.97%	15	0.72%
2004	1,776	78.20%	490	21.58%	5	0.22%
2008	1,473	69.61%	627	29.63%	16	0.76%
2012	1,439	73.46%	506	25.83%	14	0.71%
2016	1,546	76.95%	403	20.06%	60	2.99%
2020	1,853	80.81%	428	18.67%	12	0.52%
2024	2,175	84.73%	371	14.45%	21	0.82%

United States Senate election results for Lynn County, Texas1
Year	Republican		Democratic		Third party(ies)	
Year	No.	%	No.	%	No.	%
2024	2,118	4.93%	37,560	87.46%	3,266	7.61%

United States Senate election results for Lynn County, Texas2
Year	Republican		Democratic		Third party(ies)	
Year	No.	%	No.	%	No.	%
2020	1,817	81.59%	367	16.48%	43	1.93%

Texas Gubernatorial election results for Lynn County
Year	Republican		Democratic		Third party(ies)	
Year	No.	%	No.	%	No.	%
2022	1,502	86.97%	196	11.35%	29	1.68%

== Education ==
School districts serving the county include:

- Dawson Independent School District
- New Home Independent School District
- O'Donnell Independent School District
- Post Independent School District
- Slaton Independent School District
- Southland Independent School District
- Tahoka Independent School District
- Wilson Independent School District

The county is in the service area of South Plains College.

== See also ==
- National Register of Historic Places listings in Lynn County, Texas
- Recorded Texas Historic Landmarks in Lynn County
