= Shallowater, Texas =

- City
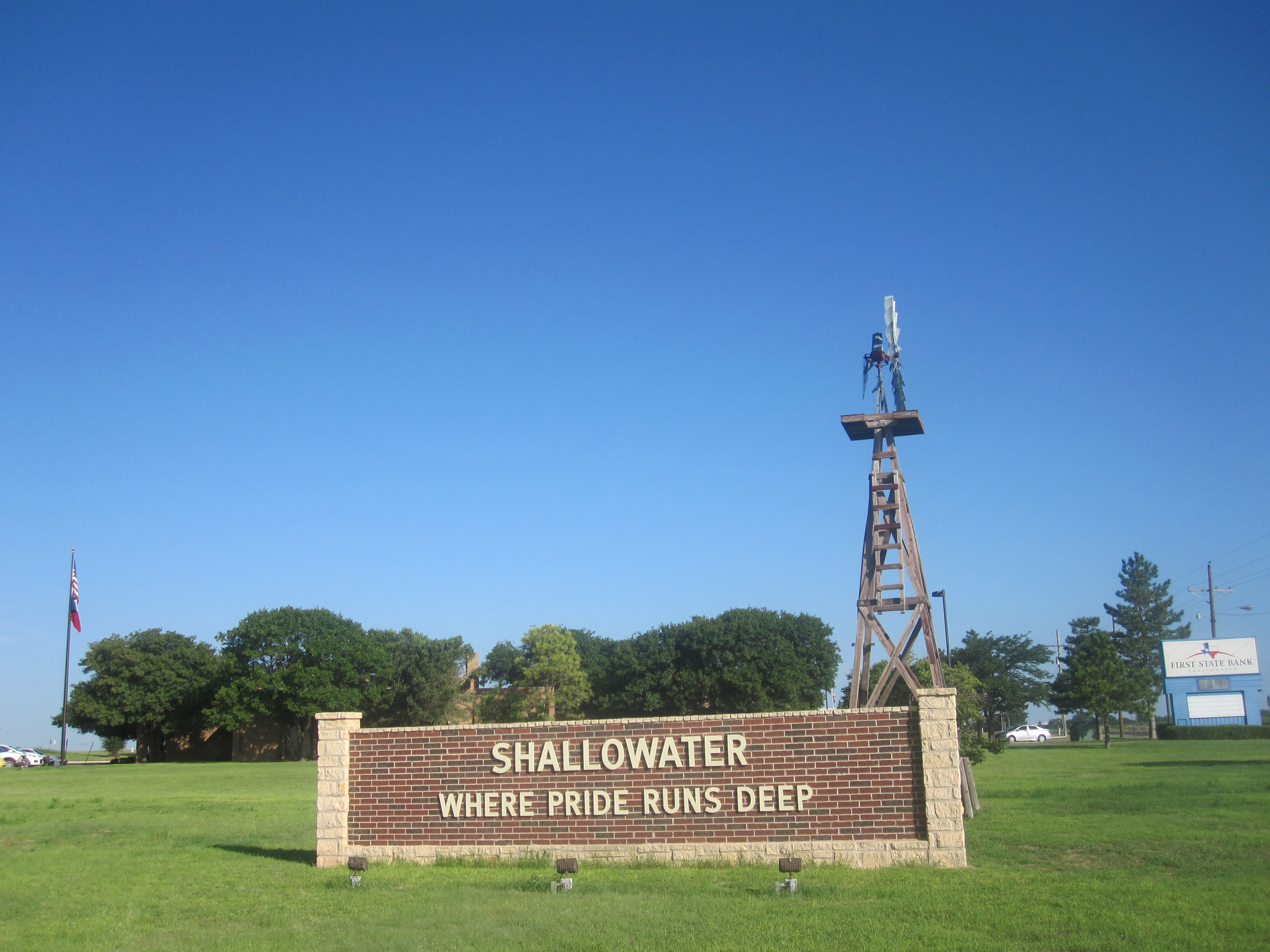
- Shallowater welcome sign

- Location within Texas
- Coordinates: 33°41′20″N 101°59′54″W
- Country: United States
- State: Texas
- County: Lubbock
- Region: Llano Estacado
- Established: 1909

Area
  - Total: 1.45 sq mi (3.76 km^{2})
  - Land: 1.45 sq mi (3.75 km^{2})
  - Water: 0 sq mi (0.00 km^{2})
- Elevation: 3,294 ft (1,004 m)

Population (2020)
  - Total: 2,964
  - Density: 2,050/sq mi (790/km^{2})
- Time zone: UTC-6 (CST)
- ZIP code: 79363
- Area code: 806
- FIPS code: 48-67136
- Website: http://www.shallowatertx.us/

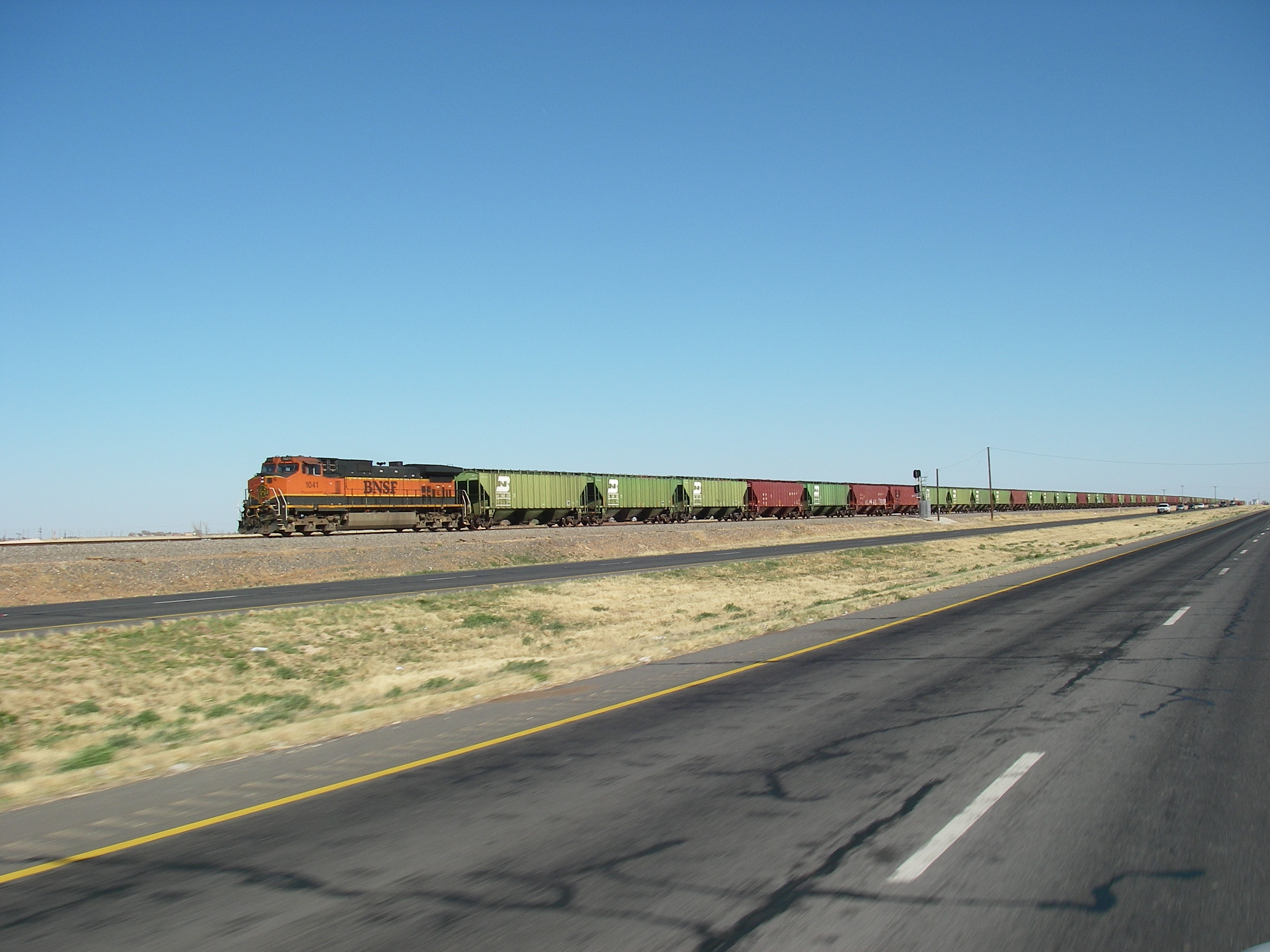
Freight train passing to the northwest of Shallowater: Railroad tracks run parallel to U.S. Route 84 as they cross the level plains of the Llano Estacado.

Shallowater is a city in Lubbock County, Texas, United States. Shallowater is on U.S. Route 84 and the Burlington Northern Santa Fe line, 12 miles (19 km) northwest of Lubbock. Its population was 2,964 at the 2020 census. It is part of the Lubbock metropolitan statistical area.

== Geography ==
Shallowater is located on the high plains of the Llano Estacado at 33°41′20″N 101°59′54″W (33.6889728, –101.9982275).

According to the United States Census Bureau, the city has a total area of 1.5 sq mi (4.0 km^{2}), all land.

=== Climate ===
According to the Köppen climate classification, Shallowater has a semiarid climate, BSk on climate maps.

== History ==
As early as 1909 J. C. (Jim) Bowles, whose ranch was adjacent to the site of what is now Shallowater, persuaded Bob Crump, a member of a ranching family, to help form a townsite company and attract a railroad to go through the area. Land was purchased for the townsite on May 18, 1909. A school was built at that time. After Santa Fe railroad officials received a bonus from rancher George W. Littlefield of the Yellow House Ranch, negotiations were finally completed. The originators of the plan, and other interested individuals, formed the Ripley Townsite Company, which was named after a Santa Fe railroad official, and was incorporated on May 22, 1909. The company decided to name the new town Shallowater to attract settlers. On June 26, 1913, a celebration was held to note the founding of the town and completion of the railroad. By the time the town was established, the ranching industry in the area was waning, and many of the large ranches were being divided into smaller lots for farmers. Cotton became an important cash crop. During the 1920s, Shallowater grew rapidly, and the town had a hotel, a lumberyard, and various filling stations, grocery stores, cotton gins, drugstores, barbershops, garages, blacksmith shops, and other businesses. Several churches and schools were also built. A county park with a clubhouse was established, a public well was constructed, and a real depot building was built to replace the boxcar the town had been using for years. From 1920 to 1922, the railroad station was known as Pacita. In 1928, the town had an estimated population of 250. In 1955, Shallowater was incorporated with a mayor-council form of city government, and during the 1960s, the town had five churches, a school, a bank, a library, and a newspaper. The community in 1970 had 30 businesses, including one of the largest hatcheries in the county. The population of Shallowater was 1,001 in 1960 and 1,339 in 1970. In the late 1980s, Shallowater had a post office, 17 businesses, and a population of 2,107. It was a farm marketing center with processing and storing facilities. In 2010, the population was 2,484.

== Demographics ==
Historical population
Census	Pop.	Note	%±
1960	1,001		—
1970	1,339		33.8%
1980	1,932		44.3%
1990	1,708		−11.6%
2000	2,086		22.1%
2010	2,484		19.1%
2020	2,964		19.3%
U.S. Decennial Census

=== 2020 census ===
As of the 2020 census, Shallowater had a population of 2,964, 997 households, and 736 families residing in the city.

The median age was 34.5 years, 32.1% of the population was under 18, and 12.7% was 65 or older; for every 100 females there were 94.1 males, and there were 89.5 males for every 100 females age 18 and over.

100.0% of residents lived in urban areas, while 0.0% lived in rural areas.

There were 997 households in Shallowater, of which 47.1% had children under the age of 18 living in them. Of all households, 61.9% were married-couple households, 11.1% had a male householder with no spouse or partner present, and 23.8% had a female householder with no spouse or partner present. About 17.8% of households were made up of individuals and 9.9% had someone living alone who was 65 years of age or older.

There were 1,060 housing units, of which 5.9% were vacant. The homeowner vacancy rate was 1.8% and the rental vacancy rate was 6.0%.

Racial composition as of the 2020 census
Race	Number	Percent
White	2,341	79.0%
Black or African American	16	0.5%
American Indian and Alaska Native	48	1.6%
Asian	2	0.1%
Native Hawaiian and Other Pacific Islander	1	0.0%
Some other race	187	6.3%
Two or more races	369	12.4%
Hispanic or Latino (of any race)	752	25.4%

=== 2000 census ===
As of the census of 2000, 2,084 people, 745 households, and 590 families were residing in the city. The population density was 2,272.7 people/sq mi (875.4/km^{2}). The 784 housing units averaged 854.2/sq mi (329.0/km^{2}). The racial makeup of the city was 90.99% White, 0.67% African American, 0.86% Native American, 0.24% Asian, 6.42% from other races, and 0.81% from two or more races. Hispanics or Latinos of any race were 16.20% of the population.

Of the 745 households, 42.6% had children under the age of 18 living with them, 65.1% were married couples living together, 11.4% had a female householder with no husband present, and 20.8% were not families. About 19.5% of all households were made up of individuals, and 10.1% had someone living alone who was 65 years of age or older. The average household size was 2.80, and the average family size was 3.21.

In the city, the age distribution was 29.8% under 18, 8.4% from 18 to 24, 27.0% from 25 to 44, 22.3% from 45 to 64, and 12.4% who were 65 or older. The median age was 36 years. For every 100 females, there were 92.3 males. For every 100 females age 18 and over, there were 85.7 males.

The median income for a household in the city was $38,750, and for a family was $44,491. Males had a median income of $32,383 versus $21,964 for females. The per capita income for the city was $16,752. About 8.6% of families and 9.4% of the population were below the poverty line, including 11.1% of those under age 18 and 9.5% of those age 65 or over.

== Education ==
Shallowater is served by the Shallowater Independent School District, and is home to the 2004 boys and girls state-championship basketball teams. Notable people associated with Shallowater include Eric Morris, who grew up in the town and played football at Texas Tech before becoming a college football coach. He was named head coach of the Oklahoma State Cowboys in January 2026. Country singer and songwriter Cody Canada, founder of the band Cross Canadian Ragweed, also has roots in the area.

The county is in the service area of South Plains College.

== Religion ==
The City of Shallowater is served by five churches: First Baptist Church Shallowater, New Hope Community Church, Shallowater United Methodist Church, St. Philip Catholic Church, and the Twelfth Street Church of Christ. The churches meet once a year for a community Thanksgiving service.

== See also ==
- Yellow House Draw
- Llano Estacado
- West Texas
- U.S. Route 84
