= Tahoka, Texas =

- City
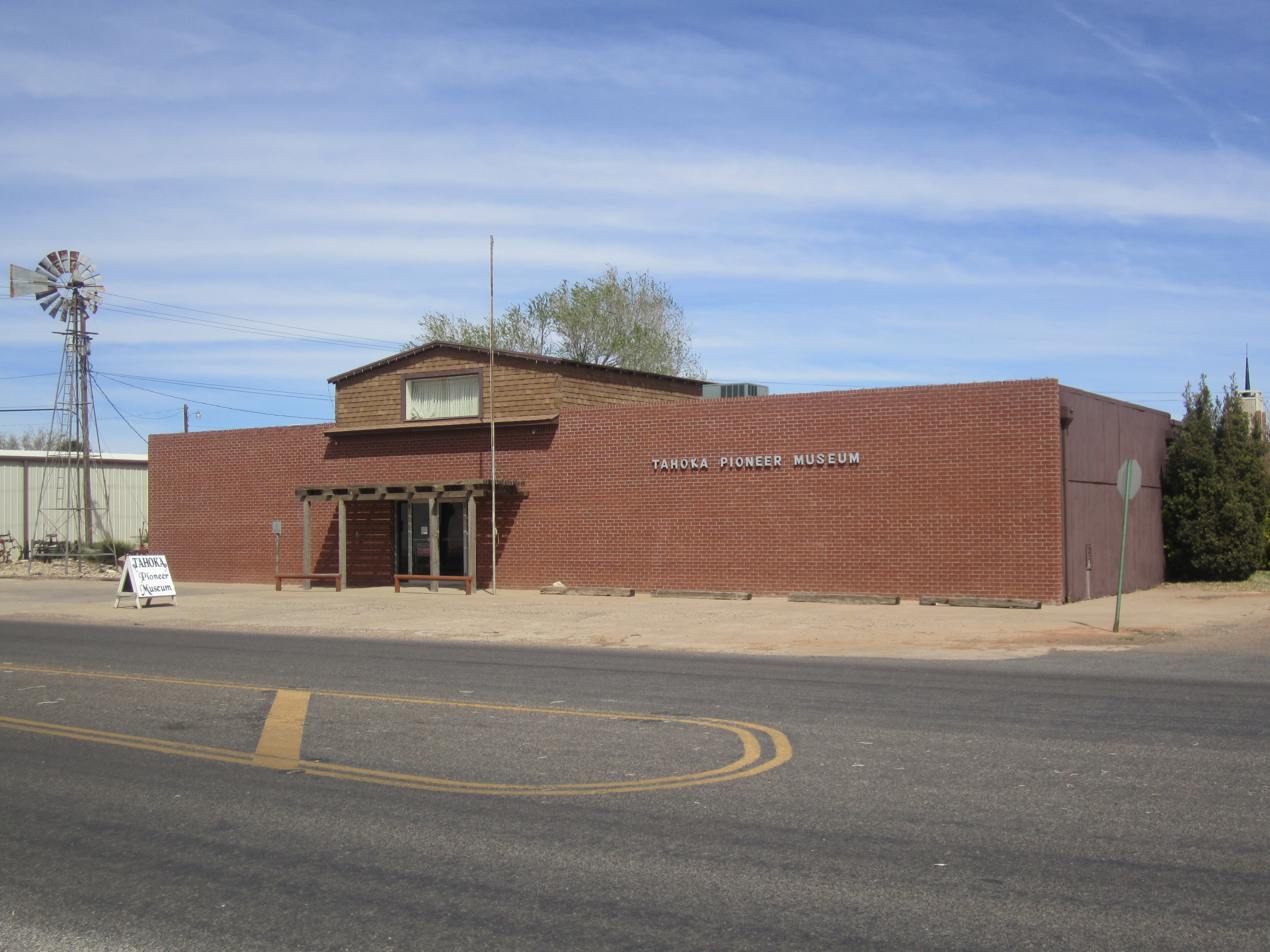
- Pioneer Museum in Tahoka
- Motto: "Where Family Values and Community Spirit Reside"
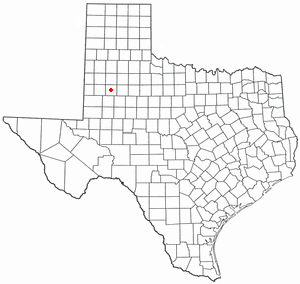
- Location of Tahoka, Texas

- Coordinates: 33°9′57″N 101°47′58″W
- Country: United States
- State: Texas
- County: Lynn
- Established: high school

Area
  - Total: 2.39 sq mi (6.20 km^{2})
  - Land: 2.38 sq mi (6.17 km^{2})
  - Water: 0.012 sq mi (0.03 km^{2})
- Elevation: 3,081 ft (939 m)

Population (2020)
  - Total: 2,375
  - Density: 997/sq mi (385/km^{2})
- Time zone: UTC-6 (Central (CST))
  - Summer (DST): UTC-5 (CDT)
- ZIP code: 79373
- Area code: 806
- FIPS code: 48-71708
- GNIS feature ID: 1369558
- Website: www.tahoka.org

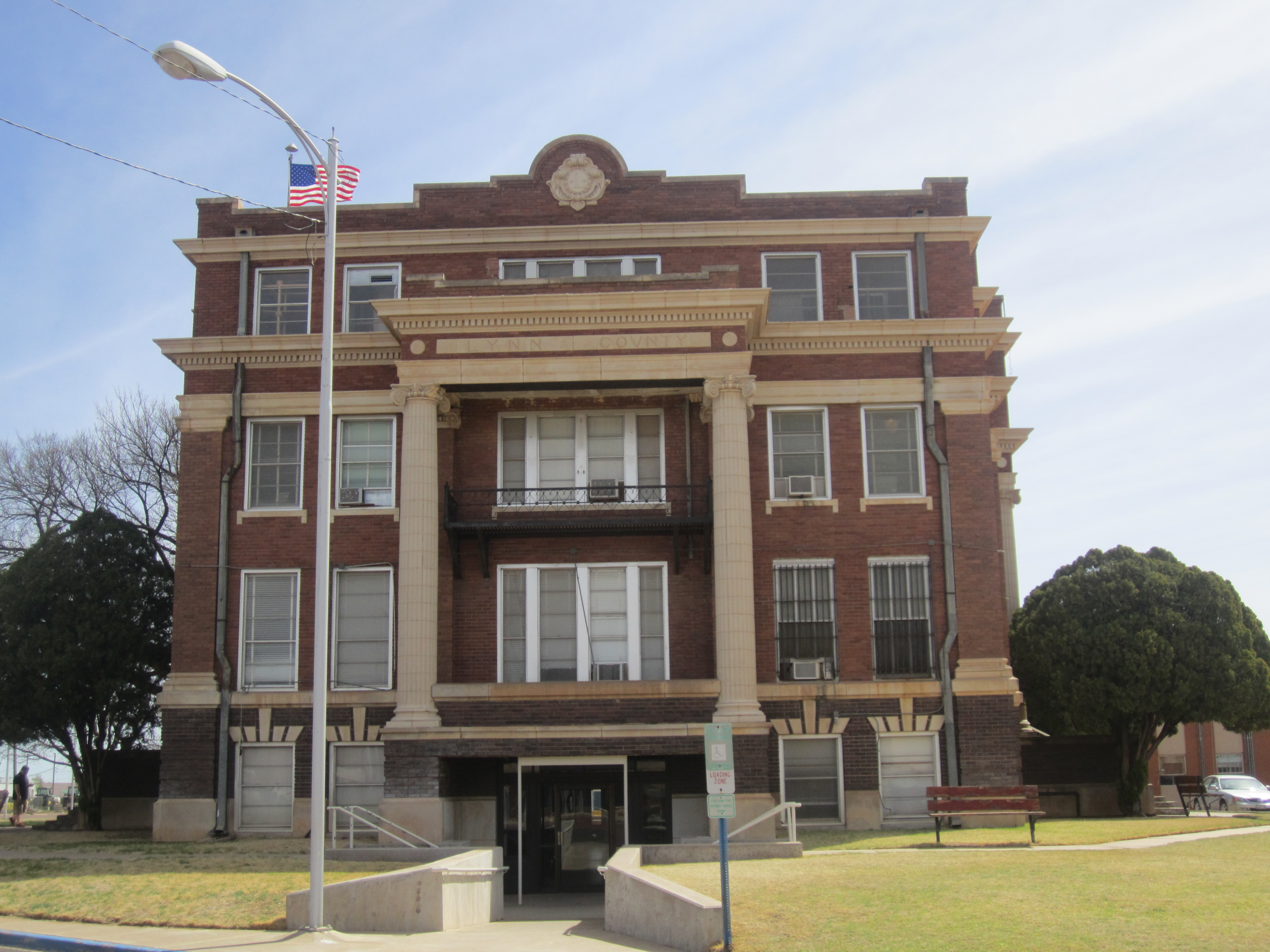
Lynn County Courthouse in Tahoka

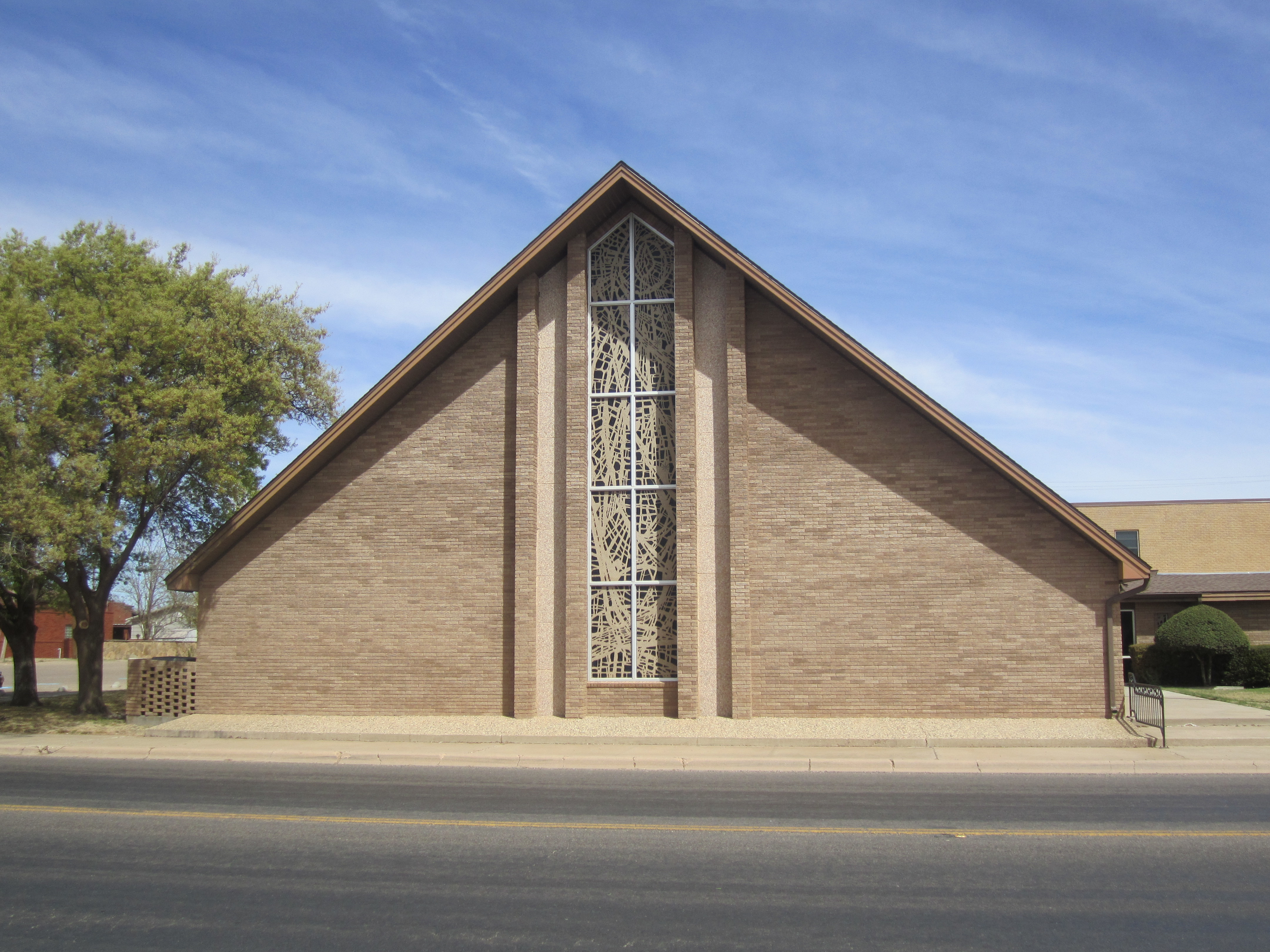
First Baptist Church in Tahoka

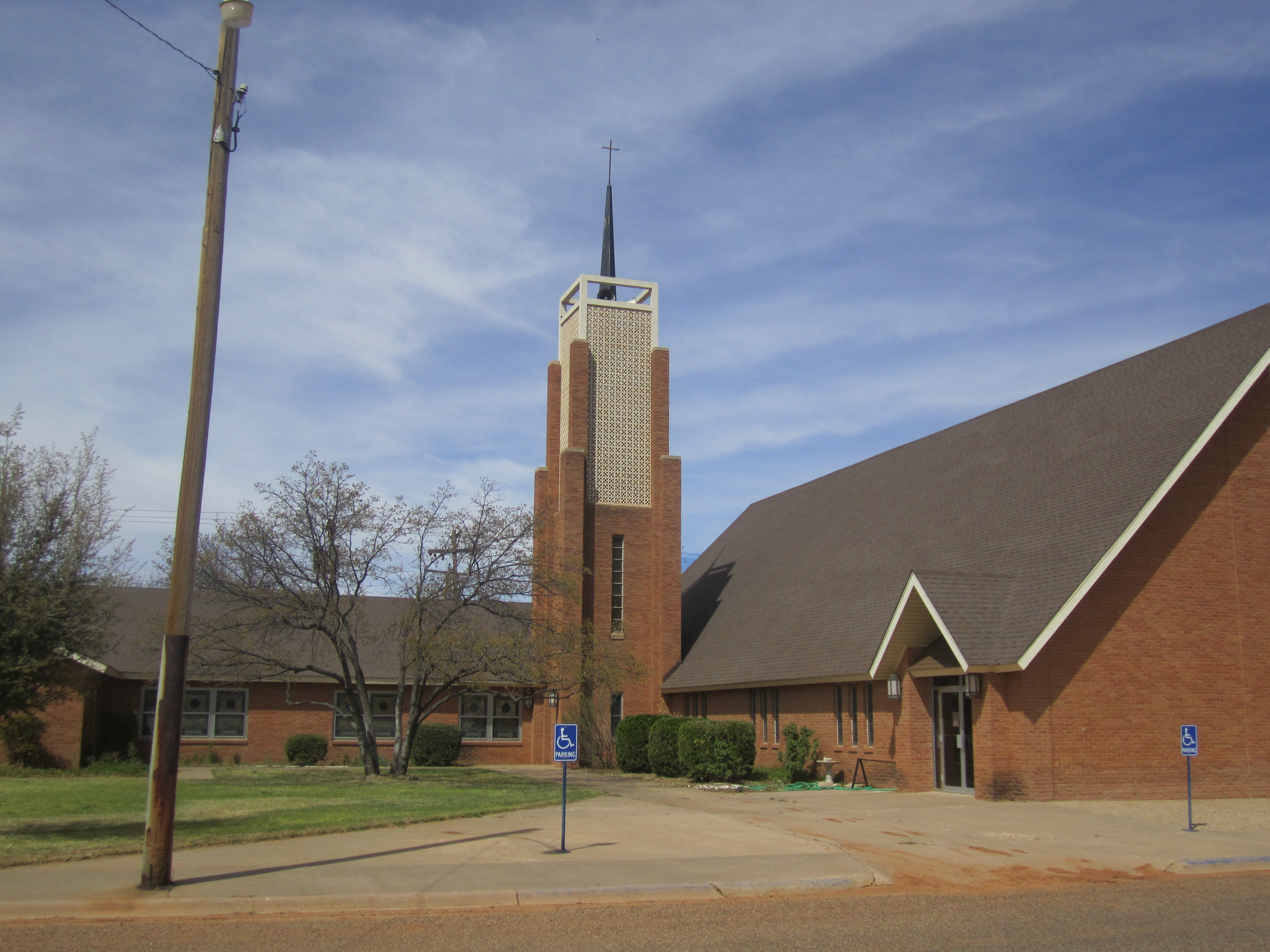
First United Methodist Church in Tahoka

Tahoka is a city in and the county seat of Lynn County, Texas, United States. The population was 2,375 at the 2020 census.

== Etymology ==
Tahoka is named after the nearby Tahoka Lake, a natural spring-fed lake. The lake's Indian name translates to "fresh or clear water."

== Geography ==
Tahoka is located at 33°9′57″N 101°47′58″W (33.165804, –101.799315).

According to the United States Census Bureau, the city has a total area of 2.4 square miles (6.2 km^{2}), of which 2.4 square miles (6.2 km^{2}) is land and 0.45% is covered by water.

=== Climate ===
According to the Köppen climate classification system, Tahoka has a semiarid climate, BSk on climate maps.

Climate data for Tahoka, Texas, 1991–2020 normals, extremes 1913–present
Month	Jan	Feb	Mar	Apr	May	Jun	Jul	Aug	Sep	Oct	Nov	Dec	Year
Record high °F (°C)	86 (30)	91 (33)	99 (37)	102 (39)	108 (42)	116 (47)	109 (43)	109 (43)	105 (41)	101 (38)	91 (33)	83 (28)	116 (47)
Mean maximum °F (°C)	76.1 (24.5)	80.6 (27.0)	87.4 (30.8)	92.4 (33.6)	98.4 (36.9)	102.2 (39.0)	101.0 (38.3)	99.5 (37.5)	96.4 (35.8)	91.3 (32.9)	82.9 (28.3)	75.9 (24.4)	104.0 (40.0)
Mean daily maximum °F (°C)	55.7 (13.2)	60.3 (15.7)	68.4 (20.2)	76.7 (24.8)	84.1 (28.9)	91.5 (33.1)	93.3 (34.1)	92.0 (33.3)	84.7 (29.3)	76.2 (24.6)	64.7 (18.2)	56.5 (13.6)	75.3 (24.1)
Daily mean °F (°C)	42.0 (5.6)	45.7 (7.6)	53.2 (11.8)	61.3 (16.3)	70.3 (21.3)	78.5 (25.8)	81.0 (27.2)	79.8 (26.6)	72.6 (22.6)	62.6 (17.0)	51.1 (10.6)	43.2 (6.2)	61.8 (16.5)
Mean daily minimum °F (°C)	28.3 (−2.1)	31.1 (−0.5)	38.1 (3.4)	45.8 (7.7)	56.5 (13.6)	65.6 (18.7)	68.8 (20.4)	67.5 (19.7)	60.4 (15.8)	49.0 (9.4)	37.4 (3.0)	29.9 (−1.2)	48.2 (9.0)
Mean minimum °F (°C)	15.6 (−9.1)	18.0 (−7.8)	23.1 (−4.9)	32.2 (0.1)	43.0 (6.1)	57.1 (13.9)	63.0 (17.2)	60.7 (15.9)	48.3 (9.1)	33.6 (0.9)	23.0 (−5.0)	16.1 (−8.8)	11.4 (−11.4)
Record low °F (°C)	−5 (−21)	−15 (−26)	3 (−16)	20 (−7)	30 (−1)	42 (6)	48 (9)	45 (7)	33 (1)	18 (−8)	4 (−16)	−3 (−19)	−15 (−26)
Average precipitation inches (mm)	0.76 (19)	0.74 (19)	1.07 (27)	1.34 (34)	2.93 (74)	2.83 (72)	2.29 (58)	2.23 (57)	2.93 (74)	1.66 (42)	1.12 (28)	0.78 (20)	20.68 (524)
Average snowfall inches (cm)	1.0 (2.5)	1.4 (3.6)	0.1 (0.25)	0.1 (0.25)	0.0 (0.0)	0.0 (0.0)	0.0 (0.0)	0.0 (0.0)	0.0 (0.0)	0.0 (0.0)	0.7 (1.8)	1.3 (3.3)	4.6 (11.7)
Average precipitation days (≥ 0.01 in)	3.4	4.0	4.0	4.0	6.5	6.5	6.0	5.8	5.6	5.4	3.9	3.7	58.8
Average snowy days (≥ 0.1 in)	0.9	0.8	0.1	0.1	0.0	0.0	0.0	0.0	0.0	0.1	0.4	0.7	3.1
Source 1: NOAA
Source 2: National Weather Service

== Demographics ==
Historical population
Census	Pop.	Note	%±
1920	786		—
1930	1,620		106.1%
1940	2,129		31.4%
1950	2,848		33.8%
1960	3,012		5.8%
1970	2,956		−1.9%
1980	3,262		10.4%
1990	2,868		−12.1%
2000	2,910		1.5%
2010	2,673		−8.1%
2020	2,375		−11.1%
U.S. Decennial Census

=== 2020 census ===
As of the 2020 census, Tahoka had a population of 2,375. The median age was 37.4 years, with 28.5% of residents under the age of 18 and 16.0% aged 65 or older. For every 100 females there were 101.8 males, and for every 100 females age 18 and over there were 98.9 males.

0.0% of residents lived in urban areas, while 100.0% lived in rural areas.

There were 935 households in Tahoka, of which 34.8% had children under the age of 18 living in them. Of all households, 47.4% were married-couple households, 18.9% were households with a male householder and no spouse or partner present, and 27.9% were households with a female householder and no spouse or partner present. About 26.9% of all households were made up of individuals and 12.8% had someone living alone who was 65 years of age or older.

There were 1,115 housing units, of which 16.1% were vacant. The homeowner vacancy rate was 1.7% and the rental vacancy rate was 16.2%.

Racial composition as of the 2020 census
Race	Number	Percent
White	1,349	56.8%
Black or African American	86	3.6%
American Indian and Alaska Native	21	0.9%
Asian	8	0.3%
Native Hawaiian and Other Pacific Islander	3	0.1%
Some other race	626	26.4%
Two or more races	282	11.9%
Hispanic or Latino (of any race)	1,159	48.8%

=== 2000 census ===
As of the census of 2000, 2,910 people, 1,063 households, and 783 families resided in the city. The population density was 1,213.9 inhabitants per square mile (468.7/km^{2}). The 1,194 housing units averaged 498.1 per square mile (192.1/km^{2}). The racial makeup of the city was 74.71% White, 5.46% African American, 1.37% Native American, 0.10% Asian, 16.36% from other races, and 1.99% from two or more races. Hispanics or Latinos of any race were 44.78% of the population.

Of 1,063 households, 39.6% had children under the age of 18 living with them, 54.5% were married couples living together, 15.6% had a female householder with no husband present, and 26.3% were not families. About 25.4% of all households were made up of individuals, and 14.7% had someone living alone who was 65 years of age or older. The average household size was 2.70 and the average family size was 3.22.

In the city, the population was distributed as 32.0% under the age of 18, 7.3% from 18 to 24, 26.0% from 25 to 44, 19.5% from 45 to 64, and 15.2% who were 65 years of age or older. The median age was 35 years. For every 100 females, there were 92.1 males. For every 100 females age 18 and over, there were 85.6 males.

The median income for a household in the city was $23,214, and for a family was $30,200. Males had a median income of $29,293 versus $20,346 for females. The per capita income for the city was $13,145. About 21.6% of families and 24.2% of the population were below the poverty line, including 25.7% of those under age 18 and 32.9% of those age 65 or over.

Tahoka is served by a weekly newspaper, nearby station KPET (AM), and the various Lubbock radio and TV stations. KAMZ (FM) and KMMX (FM) are licensed to Tahoka, but have offices and studios in Lubbock and originate few if any programs from Lynn County.

== Education ==
The city of Tahoka is served by the Tahoka Independent School District.

== Notable people ==
- James Gill (born 1934), artist
- Val Joe Walker (1930–2013), National Football League player with the Green Bay Packers and the San Francisco 49ers
