= U.S. Route 87 in Texas =

Section of U.S. highway in Texas

U.S. Highway 87
- US 87 highlighted in red

Route information
- Maintained by TxDOT
- Length: 801.1 mi (1,289.2 km)
- Existed: 1935–present

Major junctions
- South end: SH 238 in Port Lavaca
- Future I-69 / US 59 / US 77 in Victoria; US 90 in San Antonio; I-10 in San Antonio to Comfort; I-35 in San Antonio; US 67 / US 277 in San Angelo; I-20 in Big Spring; I-27 from Lubbock to Amarillo; US 70 in Plainview; US 60 in Canyon; I-40 / US 60 / US 287 in Amarillo
- North end: US 87 near Texline

Location
- Country: United States
- State: Texas
- Counties: Calhoun, Victoria, DeWitt, Gonzales, Wilson, Bexar, Kendall, Kerr, Gillespie, Mason, McCulloch, Concho, Tom Green, Coke, Sterling, Glasscock, Howard, Martin, Dawson, Lynn, Lubbock, Hale, Swisher, Randall, Potter, Moore, Hartley, Dallam

Highway system
- United States Numbered Highway System; List; Special; Divided; Highways in Texas; Interstate; US; State; Former; Toll; Loops; Spurs; FM/RM; Park; Rec
← SH 86	→ SH 87

In the U.S. state of Texas, U.S. Highway 87 (US 87) is a north–south U.S. Highway that begins near the Gulf Coast in Port Lavaca, Texas and heads north through San Antonio, Lubbock, Amarillo, and Dalhart to the New Mexico state line near Texline.

== Route description ==
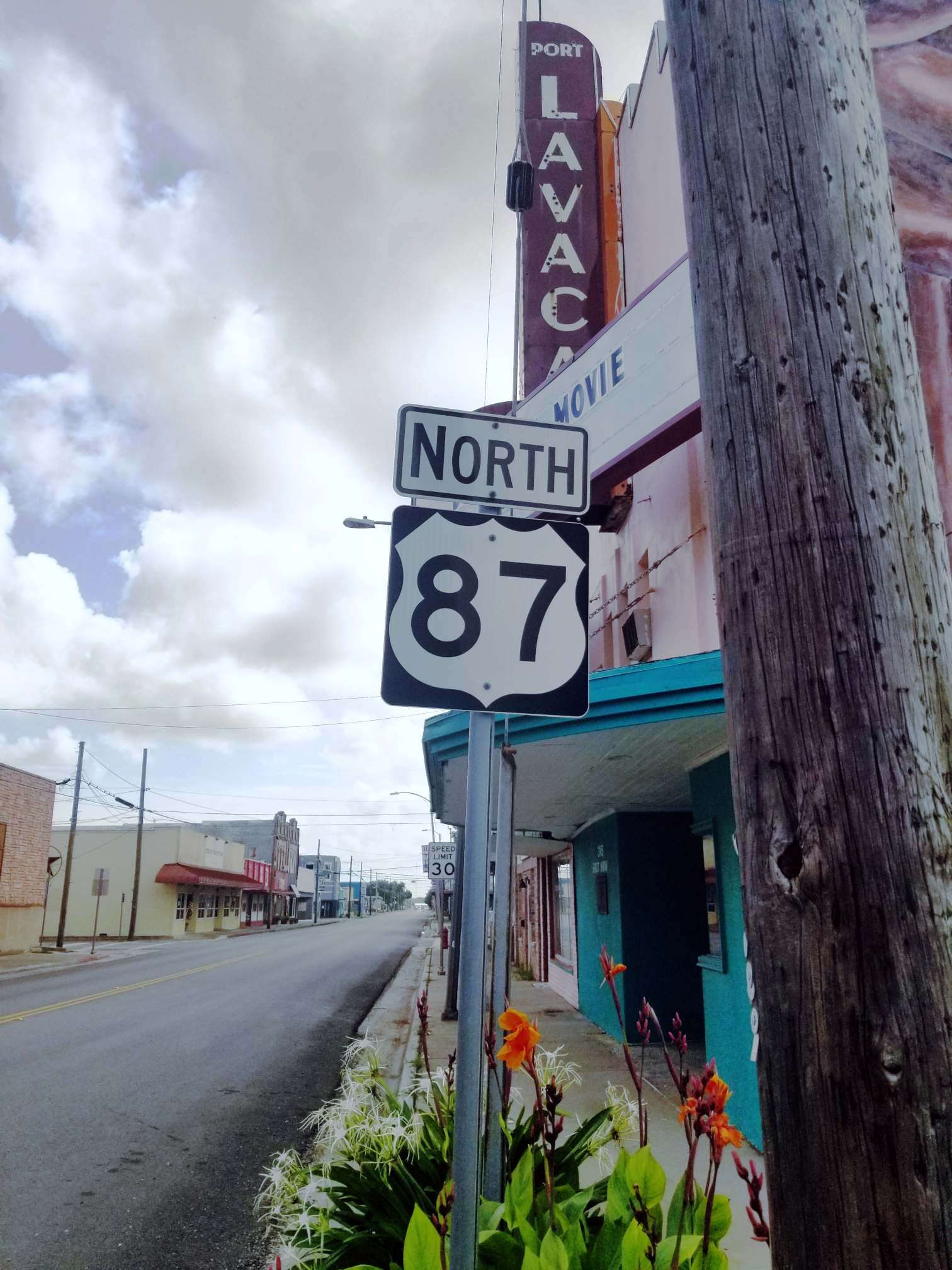
First route marker for northbound US 87 in Port Lavaca

US 87 begins at an intersection with State Highway 238 in Port Lavaca. It takes a northwesterly route out of the town, and travels to Victoria, where it intersects US 59 and US 77. Its northwesterly path continues to Cuero, where it merges with (and is briefly co-signed with) US 77 Alternate and US 183 before turning back toward the north. US 87 follows a gentle northwesterly route until just before Smiley, where it takes a more westerly turn. At Nixon, US 87 merges with State Highway 97 and continues west as a co-signed route until just west of Stockdale, where SH 97 leaves the route and US 87 continues to the northwest to San Antonio.

On the southeast side of the city, US 87 merges with Interstate 10 (I-10); the routes are concurrent for 54 miles (87 km), through San Antonio and the southern part of the Texas Hill Country until an exit at Comfort. From here, US 87 travels in an almost due northerly heading to Fredericksburg before making a slight turn back to the northwest to Mason, where it merges with US 377.

From Mason, US 87/377 continues north-northwest to Brady, where US 377 leaves the route and US 87 makes a hard turn to the west before taking yet another slight turn to the north and continuing on to San Angelo and the northwest. After intersecting with I-20 at Big Spring, US 87 continues the same northwesterly path to Lamesa, where it takes a turn back to the northeast. After making another turn back to the north just outside O'Donnell, US 87 reaches Lubbock, where it merges with I-27 on the south side of the city.

US 87 is concurrent with I-27 for a majority of its trek to Amarillo, deviating from the interstate route to spur into cities such as Kress, Tulia, and Canyon. The I-27 designation ends at I-40 in Amarillo; here, US 87 splits into the one-way pair of Fillmore Street (northbound) and Taylor Street (southbound, which also carries eastbound US 60). North of Amarillo Boulevard, US 87 and US 287 merge and head due north along a freeway alignment. The two routes separate in Dumas, with US 87 taking a sharp turn to the west before merging with US 385 in Hartley and turning to the northwest. US 385 leaves the route in Dalhart, and US 87 continues on a slight northwesterly path, crossing into New Mexico approximately a mile west of Texline.

== Future ==
On March 15, 2022, a bill was signed by President Joe Biden that added the extension of I-27 north to Raton, New Mexico, and south to Laredo to the Interstate Highway System. The extension would utilize the US 87 corridor between Raton and San Angelo, Texas. A bill introduced in March 2023 would explicitly designate the extension as I-27 with two auxiliary routes numbered I-227 and I-327. I-227 is proposed to be routed via SH 158 from Sterling City to Midland and SH 349 from Midland to Lamesa; I-327 would utilize US 287 from Dumas to the Oklahoma state line. However, after legislation passed through the U.S. Senate in August 2023, I-227 and I-327 were respectively redesignated as I-27W and I-27N, with I-27E replacing the proposed I-27 between Sterling City and Lamesa.

== Major intersections ==
County	Location	mi	km	Destinations	Notes
Calhoun	Port Lavaca	0.0	0.0	SH 238 (Commerce Street) to SH 35 – Seadrift	
Calhoun	Port Lavaca	0.2	0.32	FM 1090 (Virginia Street)	
Calhoun	Port Lavaca	1.4	2.3	FM 1090 north (South Alcoa Drive) – Placedo	
Calhoun	Port Lavaca	1.5	2.4	SH 35 – Port of Port Lavaca and Point Comfort, Palacios, Rockport	
Calhoun	Clarks	5.2	8.4	FM 2433 south to SH 238 – Seadrift	
Victoria		10.5	16.9	FM 1090 east – Port Lavaca	
Victoria	Placedo	13.8	22.2	FM 616 – Bloomington	Interchange
Victoria	Dacosta	17.7	28.5	FM 1686 – Telferner	
Victoria		22.8	36.7	FM 2615 east to FM 1686	
Victoria	Victoria	24.4	39.3	Future I-69 / US 59 – Houston, Beeville, Corpus Christi, Refugio	I-69/US 59 exit 1B; interchange; U.S. 59 is the future Interstate 69
Victoria	Victoria	26.6	42.8	SH 185 to Bus. US 59 – Bloomington, Seadrift, Houston	
Victoria	Victoria	27.6	44.4	Bus. US 59 north (East Rio Grande Street) / Bus. US 77 north (North Navarro Street) – Hallettsville, Giddings, Edna, Houston	Southern end of US 59 Bus. / US 77 Bus. overlap
Victoria	Victoria	27.9	44.9	Bus. US 59 south / Bus. US 77 south (West Rio Grande Street) – Goliad, Beeville, Refugio, Corpus Christi	Northern end of US 59 Bus. / US 77 Bus. overlap
Victoria	Victoria	31.7	51.0	US 77 / Loop 463 – Giddings, Houston, Laredo, Corpus Christi	Interchange
Victoria	Nursery	38.2	61.5	FM 447 west – Mission Valley	
DeWitt	Thomaston	43.8	70.5	Loop 105 north – Cuero	
DeWitt	Thomaston	44.7	71.9	Loop 105 south – Victoria	
DeWitt	Cuero	55.5	89.3	US 77 Alt. north / US 183 north (North Esplanade) – Gonzales, Austin, Yoakum	Southern end of US 77 Alt. / US 183 overlap
DeWitt	Cuero	56.0	90.1	FM 236 south (East Morgan) – Arneckeville, Victoria	
DeWitt	Cuero	56.3	90.6	SH 72 west (West Heaton) – Yorktown, Kenedy	
DeWitt	Cuero	58.7	94.5	US 77 Alt. south / US 183 south – Goliad, Corpus Christi	Northern end of US 77 Alt. / US 183 overlap
DeWitt	Cuero	61.3	98.7	SH 72 to US 77 Alt. / US 183 – Yorktown, Victoria, Yoakum	
DeWitt		63.8	102.7	FM 953 east – Lindenau	
DeWitt	Mustang Mott	65.2	104.9	FM 2542 west	
DeWitt		69.2	111.4	FM 2816 west	
DeWitt	Westhoff	72.1	116.0	FM 240 south (Houston Avenue) to FM 238 west – Yorktown	
Gonzales		79.4	127.8	FM 1116 north – Pilgrim, Summerville	
Gonzales	Smiley	83.7	134.7	FM 108 – Yorktown, Summerville	
Gonzales		88.9	143.1	FM 77 east to FM 108	
Gonzales	Nixon	90.2	145.2	FM 2922 north to SH 97 – Bebe, Cost	
Gonzales	Nixon	91.6	147.4	SH 80 / SH 97 east to FM 1681 north – Karnes City, Luling, Gonzales, Seguin	Southern end of SH 97 overlap
Wilson	Pandora	96.2	154.8	FM 1107 west – Stockdale	
Wilson	Pandora	96.7	155.6	FM 1347 south – Denhawken	
Wilson	Stockdale	101.6	163.5	FM 538 south to FM 1347	
Wilson	Stockdale	102.4	164.8	Bus. US 87 north – San Antonio	
Wilson	Stockdale	103.1	165.9	SH 119 south – Gillett, Yorktown	
Wilson	Stockdale	103.3	166.2	SH 123 – Seguin, San Marcos, Karnes City	Interchange
Wilson	Stockdale	104.4	168.0	Bus. US 87 south – Business District, Victoria	
Wilson		108.2	174.1	SH 97 west – Floresville, Pleasanton	Northern end of SH 97 overlap
Wilson	Sutherland Springs	110.8	178.3	FM 539 – Floresville	
Wilson	La Vernia	117.2	188.6	Loop 321 west – San Antonio	
Wilson	La Vernia	117.6	189.3	FM 775 – New Berlin, Calaveras	
Wilson	La Vernia	117.9	189.7	Loop 321 east to FM 775 – Cuero	
Wilson	La Vernia	118.7	191.0	FM 1346 – St. Hedwig	
Bexar		125.3	201.7	Loop 1604 (Anderson Loop) – St. Hedwig, Elmendorf	Interchange
Bexar	Lone Oak	125.5	202.0	FM 3465 (Lone Oak Road)	
Bexar		126.8	204.1	Loop 107 east	
Bexar	Sayers	127.8	205.7	Loop 106 west	
Bexar	Sayers	128.2	206.3	FM 1628	
Bexar	Sayers	129.4	208.2	Loop 106 east	
Bexar	China Grove	132.0	212.4	FM 1516 north – Martinez	
Bexar	San Antonio	134.5	216.5	I-410 / SH 130	I-410 exit 35
Bexar	San Antonio	135.5	218.1	Loop 13 (South W.W. White Road)	
Bexar	San Antonio	138.0	222.1	I-10 east / US 90 east / Roland Avenue – Seguin	Southern end of I-10 / US 90 overlap; US 87 south follows exit 577
see I-10
Kendall	Comfort	191.7	308.5	I-10 west / Bus. US 87 south – Kerrville	Northern end of I-10 overlap; US 87 north follows exit 523
Kerr	No major junctions				
Gillespie	Fredericksburg	213.2	343.1	US 290 east (Main Street) – Austin	Southern end of US 290 overlap
Gillespie	Fredericksburg	213.5	343.6	SH 16 north (Llano Street) – Llano	Southern end of SH 16 overlap
Gillespie	Fredericksburg	213.6	343.8	SH 16 south (Adams Street) – Kerrville	Northern end of SH 16 overlap
Gillespie	Fredericksburg	214.0	344.4	RM 965 north (Milam Street) – Enchanted Rock State Natural Area	
Gillespie	Fredericksburg	214.8	345.7	US 290 west – Harper, Junction	Northern end of US 290 overlap
Gillespie		222.6	358.2	RM 2323 north – Prairie Mountain, Llano	
Gillespie		224.3	361.0	RM 648 west – Doss	
Mason	Loyal Valley	236.8	381.1	RM 2242 – Brady	
Mason	Loyal Valley	238.0	383.0	RM 2242 – Fredericksburg	
Mason		243.6	392.0	RM 152 east – Castell, Llano	
Mason		244.6	393.6	RM 783 south – Doss, Harper, Kerrville	
Mason	Mason	254.5	409.6	RM 1723 south	
Mason	Mason	255.7	411.5	SH 29 east (Austin Street) / RM 386 north (North Live Oak Avenue) – Llano, Burnet, Fredonia	Southern end of SH 29 overlap
Mason	Mason	255.8	411.7	RM 1871 west (El Paso Street) – Junction	
Mason	Mason	257.1	413.8	US 377 south / SH 29 west – Junction, Menard	Northern end of SH 29 overlap; Southern end of US 377 overlap
Mason	Camp Air	267.1	429.9	RM 1222 – Menard, Llano	
McCulloch	Camp San Saba	274.0	441.0	FM 1955 east	
McCulloch	Brady	281.6	453.2	SH 71 east – Llano, Austin	
McCulloch	Brady	283.0	455.4	US 190 west – Menard, Fort Stockton	Southern end of US 190 overlap
McCulloch	Brady	283.3	455.9	FM 2028 west (17th Street) – G. Rollie White Complex, Brady Lake, Melvin	
McCulloch	Brady	283.8	456.7	FM 2309 south (11th Street) – Voca	
McCulloch	Brady	284.4	457.7	US 190 east / US 377 north to FM 714 – Brownwood, San Saba	Northern end of US 190 / US 377 overlap
McCulloch	Brady	288.0	463.5	US 283 north – Santa Anna, Coleman	
McCulloch		292.1	470.1	FM 3022 south – Lake Brady	
McCulloch	Melvin	300.5	483.6	FM 2028 east – Brady	
McCulloch		301.6	485.4	FM 503 north – Salt Gap, Doole, Valera	
Concho		311.0	500.5	FM 2134 north – Millersview, Ivie Reservoir	
Concho	Eden	316.6	509.5	US 83 – Menard, Ballinger, Paint Rock	
Concho		321.5	517.4	FM 176 south	
Concho		334.8	538.8	Loop 577 north – Vick, Eola	
Concho		335.7	540.3	Loop 577 south – Vick, Eola	
Tom Green		345.7	556.4	FM 2334 north – Veribest	
Tom Green		347.3	558.9	Loop 570 west – Wall	
Tom Green		349.2	562.0	Loop 570 east – Wall	
Tom Green	San Angelo	352.3	567.0	Loop 306 north	Interchange; Southern end of Loop 306 overlap
Tom Green	San Angelo	355.2	571.6	US 277 south to Loop 378 – Eldorado	Interchange; Southern end of US 277 overlap; no direct northbound exit (signed at Loop 378)
Tom Green	San Angelo	356.0	572.9	Country Club Road – Goodfellow AFB	Interchange
Tom Green	San Angelo	356.4	573.6	Loop 306 west to US 67 – Big Lake	Interchange; northern end of Loop 306 overlap; access to San Angelo Community Medical Center
Tom Green	San Angelo	357.5	575.3	Ben Ficklin Road	Interchange; southbound exit and northbound entrance
Tom Green	San Angelo	359.5	578.6	RM 584 south (Knickerbocker Road)	
Tom Green	San Angelo	359.8	579.0	FM 388 east (West Avenue L) – Angelo State University	
Tom Green	San Angelo	361.0	581.0	Bus. US 67 south (West Beauregard Avenue)	Southern end of US 67 Bus. overlap
Tom Green	San Angelo	361.5	581.8	US 67 / US 277 north / Bus. US 67 ends	Interchange; Northern end of US 277 / US 67 Bus. overlap
Tom Green	San Angelo	362.3	583.1	SH 208 north (19th Street) – Robert Lee	
Tom Green		365.3	587.9	Chadbourne Street	Interchange; former Loop 378
Tom Green		366.5	589.8	FM 2105 east	
Tom Green	Grape Creek	370.6	596.4	FM 2288 – Grape Creek	Interchange
Tom Green	Water Valley	384.6	619.0	RM 2034 – Robert Lee	
Coke	No major junctions				
Sterling	Sterling City	403.4	649.2	SH 158 east – E.V. Spence Reservoir, Robert Lee	Southern end of SH 158 overlap
Sterling	Sterling City	404.4	650.8	SH 163 south – Ozona	Southern end of SH 163 overlap
Sterling		407.2	655.3	SH 158 west – Midland	Interchange; Northern end of SH 158 overlap
Sterling		408.1	656.8	SH 163 north – Colorado City	Southern end of SH 163 overlap
Glasscock		434.2	698.8	FM 821 east – Coahoma	
Howard		435.6	701.0	FM 461 west	Southern end of FM 461 overlap
Howard		436.1	701.8	FM 461 east – Forsan	Northern end of FM 461 overlap
Howard				RM 33 south / Hughes Road	South end of freeway
Howard	Big Spring			Bus. US 87 north – Big Spring	Northbound exit and southbound entrance
Howard				Martha May Road, Rockhouse Road	
Howard				Frazier Road	
Howard				I-20 – El Paso, Abilene	I-20 exit 173
Howard				SH 176	
Howard				County Road 21	
Howard				Bus. US 87 south / FM 700 east	Interchange; north end of freeway
Howard		455.1	732.4	FM 2230 north	
Howard		455.4	732.9	FM 1584 north – Vealmoor	
Howard		460.7	741.4	FM 846 – Knott	
Howard		468.3	753.7	FM 2230 south – Knott	
Howard		468.7	754.3	FM 1785 east – Vealmoor	
Martin		471.0	758.0	FM 2002 west – Ackerly	
Dawson		472.1	759.8	FM 1584 south – Vealmoor	
Dawson		472.6	760.6	FM 2212 south – Ackerly	
Dawson		474.4	763.5	FM 178 north to US 180 east	
Dawson		477.9	769.1	FM 828 west – Sparenberg, Patricia	
Dawson		484.1	779.1	FM 26 south – Sparenberg	
Dawson		488.2	785.7	US 180 east / FM 2052 west / Frontage Road – Gail, Snyder	Interchange; Southern end of US 180 overlap
Dawson	Lamesa	490.6	789.5	Bus. US 87 north – Downtown Lamesa	
Dawson	Lamesa	491.0	790.2	FM 827 east – Preston E. Smith Unit	
Dawson	Lamesa	491.7	791.3	US 180 west to SH 137 / SH 349 – Seminole	Northern end of US 180 overlap; access to Medical Arts Hospital; future northern terminus of future I-27W and future I-27E
Dawson	Lamesa	491.9	791.6	FM 826 east – Lamesa Municipal Airport	
Dawson	Lamesa	492.2	792.1	Bus. US 87 south	
Dawson	Lamesa	492.9	793.2	FM 179 north	
Dawson	Lamesa	493.1	793.6	FM 2592 west – Midland, Stanton, Lamesa Municipal Airport	
Dawson		494.5	795.8	FM 825 east	
Dawson		497.1	800.0	FM 2411 east	
Dawson		502.2	808.2	FM 1210 east	
Dawson		505.8	814.0	FM 1066 west – Loop	
Lynn		508.6	818.5	Loop 76 north – O'Donnell	
Lynn		509.9	820.6	Loop 76 south / FM 2053 – Welch, O'Donnell	
Lynn		513.4	826.2	FM 213 – New Moore, Draw	
Lynn		516.4	831.1	FM 3332 east	
Lynn	Tahoka	522.3	840.6	Loop 472 – Tahoka	Interchange; south end of freeway
Lynn	Tahoka	523.4	842.3	US 380 – Brownfield, Post	
Lynn	Tahoka	524.2	843.6	Loop 472 – Tahoka	
Lynn	Tahoka	525.7	846.0	FM 400 / Frontage Road – Wilson	Interchange; north end of freeway
Lynn		531.8	855.8	FM 1317 west	
Lynn		534.7	860.5	FM 211 east – Wilson	Southern end of FM 211 overlap
Lynn		534.9	860.8	FM 211 west – New Home	Northern end of FM 211 overlap
Lubbock		541.1	870.8	FM 41 – Ropesville, Slaton	To be converted into an interchange by October 2024.
Lubbock	Woodrow	543.2	874.2	Loop 493 north – Woodrow	
Lubbock	Woodrow	543.3	874.4	Woodrow Road	Interchange
Lubbock	Woodrow	544.2	875.8	Loop 493 south – Woodrow	
Lubbock		545.3	877.6	FM 1585	Interchange; Southern end of freeway; future Loop 88
Lubbock		546.3	879.2	114th Street	
Lubbock	Lubbock	547.3	880.8	98th Street	
Lubbock	Lubbock	548.3	882.4	US 84 / Loop 289 / 82nd Street – Post	Current southern end of I-27 overlap; I-27 exit 1
see I-27
Swisher		610.2	982.0	I-27 north	Northern end of I-27 overlap; US 87 north follows exit 61
Swisher	Kress	612.1	985.1	FM 145 to I-27 – Hart	
Swisher		617.3	993.4	FM 928	
Swisher		623.4	1,003.3	SH 86 west – Dimmitt	Interchange; Southern end of SH 86 overlap
Swisher	Tulia	624.0	1,004.2	SH 86 east – Downtown Tulia, Silverton, Younger Field, Mackenzie Lake	Northern end of SH 86 overlap
Swisher	Tulia	624.5	1,005.0	FM 1318 east – Tule Lake	
Swisher		626.7	1,008.6	I-27 south	Southern end of I-27 overlap; US 87 south follows exit 77
Swisher	see I-27				
Swisher		637.3	1,025.6	I-27 north / FM 1881 east	Northern end of I-27 overlap; US 87 north follows exit 88B; no access from US 87 south to I-27 north
Swisher	Happy	639.1	1,028.5	FM 1075 west	Southern end of FM 1075 overlap
Randall	Happy	639.5	1,029.2	FM 1075 east to I-27	Northern end of FM 1075 overlap
Randall		641.7	1,032.7	FM 1705 north	
Randall		643.8	1,036.1	FM 285 east – Wayside	
Randall		651.5	1,048.5	FM 1714 west – Buffalo Lake National Wildlife Refuge	
Randall	Canyon	656.1	1,055.9	SH 217 (4th Avenue) to I-27 – Business District, Historical Museum, Palo Duro State Park	
Randall	Canyon	656.5	1,056.5	Spur 48 east (Russell Long Boulevard)	At-grade intersection; south end of freeway
Randall	Canyon	656.6	1,056.7	US 60 west – Hereford	Southern end of US 60 overlap
Randall	Canyon	657.1	1,057.5	FM 3331 (Hunsley Road)	
Randall	Canyon	658.2	1,059.3	To I-27 south / Buffalo Stadium Road	
Randall	Canyon	659.0	1,060.6	I-27 south	Southern end of I-27 overlap; southbound left exit and northbound left entrance; I-27 exit 110
see I-27
Potter	Amarillo	672.4	1,082.1	I-27 ends / US 287 south / I-40 – Albuquerque, Oklahoma City, Fort Worth	Current northern terminus of I-27; current north end of I-27 overlap; south end of US 287 south overlap; I-27 exit 653B; I-40 exit 70
Potter	Amarillo			US 287 (Taylor Street)	One-way street, inbound access only; southbound entrance only; north end of US 287 south overlap
Potter	Amarillo	673.2	1,083.4	US 287 north / US 60 east (Buchanan Street)	One-way street, outbound access only; northbound exit only; north end of freeway; north end of US 60 east overlap
Potter	Amarillo	673.8	1,084.4	SE 6th Avenue (Loop 279 west)	Eastern terminus of Loop 279 at US 87 north (Fillmore Avenue); does not intersect US 87 south (Pierce Avenue); former Bus. US 66 west
Potter	Amarillo	674.8	1,086.0	US 60 east / I-40 BL (Amarillo Boulevard) – Tri-State Fairgrounds	Northern end of US 60 west overlap
Potter	Amarillo	675.3	1,086.8	US 287 south (Taylor Street) to I-40	One-way street, outbound access only; south end of freeway; exits only; south end of US 287 overlap
Potter	Amarillo	675.3	1,086.8	US 287 (Buchanan Street)	One-way street, inbound access only; south end of freeway; northbound entrance only; south end of US 287 overlap
Potter	Amarillo	675.4	1,087.0	NE 15th Avenue	Southbound exit only
Potter	Amarillo	675.5	1,087.1	Oak Drive	Northbound exit only
Potter	Amarillo	675.7	1,087.4	NE 24th Avenue	
Potter	Amarillo	676.3	1,088.4	Loop 434 (River Road)	northbound exit and southbound entrance
Potter	Amarillo	676.7	1,089.0	Hastings Avenue	
Potter	Amarillo	677.2	1,089.8	Central Avenue	
Potter	Amarillo	677.7	1,090.7	Loop 335 (St. Francis Avenue)	
Potter	Amarillo	678.6	1,092.1	Willow Creek Avenue	
Potter	Amarillo	679.7	1,093.9	Cherry Avenue	
Potter		680.7	1,095.5	Loop 434 / Mobley Avenue	
Potter		681.7	1,097.1	FM 2176	Northern end of freeway
Moore		709.1	1,141.2	SH 354 west / FM 1913 east – Lake Meredith Recreation Area, Channing	Interchange
Moore	Dumas	720.8	1,160.0	FM 722 west (14th Street)	
Moore	Dumas	721.8	1,161.6	US 287 north (Dumas Avenue) / SH 152 east (1st Street) – Etter, Amarillo College	Northern end of US 287 overlap; future southern terminus of future I-27N
Moore	Dumas	722.0	1,161.9	Twichell Avenue	Interchange
Moore		725.2	1,167.1	FM 2589 south	
Hartley		737.2	1,186.4	FM 3138 south	
Hartley	Hartley	745.2	1,199.3	US 385 south – Channing	Interchange; Southern end of US 385 overlap
Hartley	Hartley	746.0	1,200.6	FM 807 north / FM 998 north	
Hartley	Dalhart	757.5	1,219.1	FM 281 – Etter	
Dallam	Dalhart	759.8	1,222.8	Bus. US 87 north (7th Street) / Tennessee Avenue	
Dallam	Dalhart	760.4	1,223.7	US 54 / FM 297 – Tucumcari, Stratford, Airport	
Dallam	Dalhart	760.5	1,223.9	US 385 north – Boise City	Northern end of US 385 overlap
Dallam	Dalhart	762.0	1,226.3	Spur 17 east / FM 1727 west	
Dallam		768.6	1,236.9	SH 102 west – Sedan	
Dallam		778.1	1,252.2	FM 1879 north – Boise City	
Dallam	Perico	784.8	1,263.0	FM 3110 south	
Dallam	Texline	795.9	1,280.9	FM 296 – Boise City	
Dallam		797.1	1,282.8	US 87 north – Clayton	New Mexico state line
1.000 mi = 1.609 km; 1.000 km = 0.621 mi: Concurrency terminus; Incomplete access

== See also ==
- Loops of U.S. Route 87 in Texas
- Interstate 27

U.S. Route 87
Previous state: Terminus	Texas	Next state: New Mexico
