= Special routes of U.S. Route 87 in Texas =

Special routes of U.S. Route 87

System links
- Highways in Texas; Interstate; US; State; Former; Toll; Loops; Spurs; FM/RM; Park; Rec

The following special routes exist or existed parallel to U.S. Route 87 (US 87) in Texas, primarily along former alignments. They are varyingly designated by the Texas Department of Transportation (TxDOT) as business routes of US 87, state highway loops and spurs, and business loops of Interstate 27 (I-27).

== Stockdale ==
Business U.S. Highway 87
- Location: Stockdale
- Length: 2.115 mi (3.404 km)
- Existed: 1990–present

Business U.S. Highway 87-U is the old route of US 87 through Stockdale. It was formed on May 31, 1965 as Loop 411, but always marked as a business route of US 87; On June 21, 1990 the official designation was changed to Business US 87.

Junction list

The entire route is in Wilson County.

Location	mi	km	Destinations	Notes
	0.0	0.0	US 87 / SH 97 – Nixon, Gonzalez, Pandora	Southern terminus
Stockdale	1.3	2.1	FM 1107 east – Pandora	
Stockdale	1.5	2.4	SH 123 – Karnes City, Seguin	
Stockdale	2.1	3.4	US 87 / SH 97 – Floresville, San Antonio	Northern terminus
1.000 mi = 1.609 km; 1.000 km = 0.621 mi

== La Vernia ==
State Highway Loop 321
- Location: La Vernia
- Length: 0.753 mi (1,212 m)
- Existed: 1957–present

Loop 321 is the old route of US 87 through La Vernia, formed in on July 16, 1957.

Junction list

The entire route is in La Vernia, Wilson County.

mi	km	Destinations	Notes
0.0	0.0	US 87 – Stockdale, San Antonio	Western terminus
0.3	0.48	FM 775 south (Bluebonnet Drive)	West end of FM 775 overlap
0.4	0.64	FM 775 north – Seguin	East end of FM 775 overlap
0.8	1.3	US 87 – Stockdale, San Antonio	Eastern terminus
1.000 mi = 1.609 km; 1.000 km = 0.621 mi: Concurrency terminus

== San Antonio ==
State Highway Spur 345
- Location: San Antonio
- Length: 2.7 mi (4.3 km)
- Existed: 1962–present

Spur 345 is the old route of US 87 through northern San Antonio, formed on January 26, 1962, as Loop 345. It begins at I-10/US 87 at Woodlawn Avenue, and runs northwest on Fredericksburg Road to I-10/US 87 near Huebner Road. When first designated, Loop 345 was marked as a business route of US 87. On December 18, 2014, the section of Loop 345 from I-410 south to I-10 was removed from the state highway system, and the rest was redesignated as Spur 345.

== Boerne ==
Business U.S. Highway 87
- Location: Boerne
- Length: 4.81 mi (7.74 km)

Business US Highway 87 follows the old route of US 87 through Boerne. It runs along Main Street, east of the I-10/US 87 freeway, between exits 542 and 537. It intersects SH 46 in downtown Boerne and has junctions with RM 474 and RM 1376. While signed as a business route, it is not officially designated as such by TxDOT; the agency considers the route through Boerne to be mainline US 87.

Junction list

The entire route is in Boerne, Kendall County.

mi	km	Destinations	Notes
0.0	0.0	I-10 / US 87 – San Antonio	Southern terminus; I-10 exit 542
1.2	1.9	SH 46 west (Bandera Road) to I-10 west / SH 16	South end of SH 46 overlap
1.8	2.9	SH 46 east (River Road) – New Braunfels	North end of SH 46 overlap
2.2	3.5	RM 474 north / West Blanco Road	
3.4	5.5	RM 1376 north – Sisterdale	
4.4– 4.8	7.1– 7.7	I-10 / US 87 – Comfort, San Antonio	Northern terminus; I-10 exit 537
1.000 mi = 1.609 km; 1.000 km = 0.621 mi: Concurrency terminus

== Comfort ==
Business U.S. Highway 87
- Location: Comfort
- Length: 1.6 mi (2.6 km)

Business US Highway 87 follows the old route of US 87 through Comfort. Beginning at exit 524 of northbound I-10/US 87 freeway, it runs northwest along Front Street, concurrent with SH 27. Two routes separate, with SH 27 heading west while Business US 87 turns to the north, reaching a junction with RM 473 in downtown Comfort. It reaches its northern terminus at I-10 exit 523, which is where US 87 separates from the Interstate and heads north. While signed as a business route, it is not officially designated as such by TxDOT; the agency considers the route through Comfort to be mainline US 87.

Junction list

The entire route is in Comfort, Kendall County.

mi	km	Destinations	Notes
0.0	0.0	I-10 / US 87 to FM 289 / FM 1621 – Boerne, San Antonio, Waring	Southern terminus; I-10 exit 524
0.3– 0.6	0.48– 0.97	Bridge over Guadalupe River	
0.8– 0.9	1.3– 1.4	SH 27 west – Center Point, Kerrville	Western end of SH 27 concurrency
1.0	1.6	RM 473 – Sisterdale, Kerrville, Old Tunnel State Park	
1.6	2.6	I-10 / US 87 – Kerrville, San Antonio, Fredericksburg	Northern terminus; I-10 exit 523; eastern end of SH 27 concurrency
1.000 mi = 1.609 km; 1.000 km = 0.621 mi: Concurrency terminus

== Big Spring ==
Business U.S. Highway 87
- Location: Big Spring
- Length: 8.2 mi (13.2 km)
- Existed: 2013–present

Business US Highway 87-M follows the old route of US 87 through Big Spring. The highway was designated in 2013 with the construction of a new expressway route for US 87 around the town. The expressway south of I-20 opened to traffic in 2016 while the northern section opened in 2020.

Junction list

The entire route is in Howard County.

Location	mi	km	Destinations	Notes
	0.0	0.0	US 87 / RM 33 south – San Angelo, Garden City	Interchange; southern terminus; southbound exit and northbound entrance
Big Spring	2.9	4.7	FM 700	Interchange
Big Spring	4.4	7.1	I-20 BL east (West 4th Street)	
Big Spring	4.4	7.1	I-20 BL west (West 5th Street)	
Big Spring	5.5	8.9	I-20 – El Paso, Fort Worth	I-20 exit 177
	7.5– 8.2	12.1– 13.2	US 87 / FM 700 east	Interchange; northern terminus; northbound exit and southbound entrance
1.000 mi = 1.609 km; 1.000 km = 0.621 mi: Incomplete access

== Vick ==
State Highway Loop 577
- Location: Vick
- Length: 1.063 mi (1.711 km)
- Existed: 1991–present

Loop 577 is the old route of US 87 through Vick, formed October 6, 1991. About midway, it intersects the south end of FM 381.

Junction list

The entire route is in Concho County.

Location	mi	km	Destinations	Notes
	0.0	0.0	US 87 – Eden, San Angelo	Southern terminus
Vick	0.4	0.64	FM 381 north – Eola	
	1.1	1.8	US 87 – Eden, San Angelo	Northern terminus
1.000 mi = 1.609 km; 1.000 km = 0.621 mi

== Wall ==
State Highway Loop 570
- Location: Wall
- Length: 1.903 mi (3.063 km)
- Existed: 1990–present

Loop 570 is the old route of US 87 through Wall, formed on March 19, 1990.

== Lamesa ==
Business U.S. Highway 87
- Location: Lamesa
- Length: 1.747 mi (2.812 km)
- Existed: 1990–present

Business U.S. Highway 87-K is the old route of US 87 through Lamesa. It was formed on December 10, 1946 as Loop 218 on Lynn Avenue. On June 21, 1990 the official designation was changed to Business US 87, and on January 2, 1992, US 87 and Business US 87 were swapped, placing the former on Lynn Avenue and the latter on Dallas Avenue.

Junction list

The entire route is in Lamesa, Dawson County.

mi	km	Destinations	Notes
0.0	0.0	US 87 / US 180	Southern terminus
1.2	1.9	US 180 (North 4th Street) to SH 349	Access to Medical Arts Hospital
1.7	2.7	US 87	Northern terminus
1.000 mi = 1.609 km; 1.000 km = 0.621 mi

== Tahoka ==
State Highway Loop 472
- Location: Tahoka
- Length: 1.859 mi (2.992 km)
- Existed: 1969–present

Loop 472 is the old route of US 87 through Tahoka, formed on January 31, 1969.

== Woodrow ==
State Highway Loop 493
- Location: Lubbock County
- Length: 1.087 mi (1.749 km)
- Existed: October 2, 1970–present

Loop 493 is located in Lubbock County. It is a former routing of US 87 through the community of Woodrow.

Loop 493 begins at US 87 south of Woodrow. It travels to the north, paralleling US 87 to its east. In Woodrow, the route passes Lubbock-Cooper High School at Woodrow Road. Loop 493 then curves back to the north and ends at another point on US 87.

Loop 493 was designated on October 2, 1970, when US 87 was upgraded between Lubbock and Tahoka and moved to the east of Woodrow. It was originally signed as a business route of US 87.

== Lubbock ==
Business U.S. Highway 87
- Location: Lubbock
- Length: 3.833 mi (6.169 km)
- Existed: May 27, 1992–February 25, 2010

Business U.S. Highway 87-G was the old route of US 87 through Lubbock, formed in mid-1992 when Interstate 27 was completed and US 87 was moved onto it. The highway traveled along Avenue A, beginning at a junction with I-27 / US 87 / US 84, running northward to a junction with I-27 / US 87 / US 82.

On February 25, 2010, Business U.S. Highway 87-G was cancelled, and TxDOT transferred ownership of the road to the city of Lubbock.

Junction list

The entire route was in Lubbock, Lubbock County.

mi	km	Destinations	Notes
0.0	0.0	I-27 / US 87 / US 84 (Slaton Road)	I-27 exit 1
1.9	3.1	FM 835 east (34th Street)	
3.8	6.1	I-27 / US 87 / US 82 (4th Street)	I-27 exit 4
1.000 mi = 1.609 km; 1.000 km = 0.621 mi

== New Deal ==
State Highway Loop 461
- Location: Lubbock County
- Length: 1.719 mi (2.766 km)
- Existed: February 29, 1968–present

Loop 461 is the former route of US 87 in New Deal. It was designated on February 29, 1968, and was originally signed as a business route of US 87. Its southern terminus is at I-27/US 87 exit 13. It runs north along two-lane, undivided Monroe Avenue, to the west of a BNSF Railway line. The highway crosses FM 1729 (Main Street) before reaching its northern terminus at I-27/US 87 exit 15.

== Abernathy ==
State Highway Loop 369
- Location: Lubbock and Hale counties
- Length: 1.496 mi (2.408 km)
- Existed: September 25, 1962–present

Loop 369 is the former alignment of US 87 in Abernathy, It was designated on September 25, 1962. Its southern terminus is at exit 20 of I-27/US 87 in the Lubbock County portion of the city. It heads north-northwest on South Avenue D before curving north, reaching an intersection with FM 597. After crossing into Hale County, Loop 369 reaches its northern terminus at exit 22 of I-27/US 87 in the northern part of the city.

== Hale Center ==
Business Interstate 27-T
- Location: Hale Center
- Length: 1.168 mi (1.880 km)
- Existed: April 5, 2002–present

Business Interstate 27-T is the old route of US 87 through Hale Center.

== Plainview ==
Business Interstate 27-U
- Location: Plainview
- Length: 9.282 mi (14.938 km)
- Existed: February 15, 1967–present

Business Interstate 27-U is the old route of US 87 through Plainview. It was previously Loop 445.

== Amarillo ==
State Highway Loop 434
- Location: Amarillo
- Length: 4.999 mi (8.045 km)
- Existed: 1966–present

Loop 434 is the old route of US 87 through northern Amarillo, formed on August 31, 1966. The highway is known locally as River Road.

Loop 434 begins at a junction with US 87 / US 287 near the Amarillo Zoo and Wonderland Park. The highway travels in a northern direction through suburban areas, with the route becoming more rural towards the north. Loop 434 ends at an intersection with the northbound frontage road of US 87 / US 287 near River Road High School.

Junction list

The entire route is in Potter County.

Location	mi	km	Destinations	Notes
Amarillo	0.0	0.0	US 87 / US 287 (Dumas Drive)	
Amarillo	1.3	2.1	Loop 335 (St. Francis Avenue)	
	5.0	8.0	US 87 north / US 287 north	
1.000 mi = 1.609 km; 1.000 km = 0.621 mi

== Dalhart ==
Business U.S. Highway 87
- Location: Dalhart
- Length: 0.469 mi (755 m)
- Existed: 1990–present

Business U.S. Highway 87-B is a loop of US 87 through Dalhart. It was formed in early 1954 as Loop 276, but always marked as a business route of US 87; in early 1991 the official designation was changed to Business US 87.
