= List of state highway loops in Texas (100–199) =

- Texas State Highway Loop marker

Highway names
- Interstates: Interstate Highway X (IH-X, I-X)
- US Highways: U.S. Highway X (US X)
- State: State Highway X (SH X)
- Loops: Loop X
- Spurs: Spur X
- Farm or Ranch to Market Roads: Farm to Market Road X (FM X); Ranch-to-Market Road X (RM X)
- Park Roads: Park Road X (PR X)

System links
- Highways in Texas; Interstate; US; State; Former; Toll; Loops; Spurs; FM/RM; Park; Rec

State highway loops in Texas are owned and maintained by the Texas Department of Transportation (TxDOT).

== Loop 105 ==
State Highway Loop 105
- Location: DeWitt County
- Existed: November 20, 1997–present

Loop 105 is the old route of US 87 through Thomaston, formed on November 20, 1997.

== Loop 106 ==
State Highway Loop 106
- Location: Bexar County
- Existed: March 27, 1981–present

Loop 106 is the old route of US 87 through Sayers, formed on March 27, 1981.

== Loop 107 ==
State Highway Loop 107
- Location: Bexar County
- Existed: March 27, 1981–present

Loop 107 is a former alignment of US 87 through Adkins. Its east end is at FM 3465, which is a former alignment of Loop 1604 in the area.

Loop 107 was designated on March 27, 1981.

== Loop 108 ==
State Highway Loop 108
- Location: Galveston County
- Existed: March 26, 1980–present

Loop 108 is located in Port Bolivar.

Loop 108 was designated on March 26, 1980, as a loop off SH 87 in Port Bolivar, replacing FM 2612.

== Loop 109 ==
State Highway Loop 109
- Location: Bastrop County
- Existed: August 2, 1943–present

Loop 109 is located in Elgin.

Loop 109 was designated on August 2, 1943, as a loop off SH 20/SH 95 in Elgin with a connection from SH 95 north of town to old SH 20. The route was formerly SH 20 (now US 290) before it was rerouted. On October 25, 1990, a 0.6-mile (0.97 km) section in Elgin was transferred to FM 1100.

== Loop 110 ==
State Highway Loop 110
- Location: Tom Green County
- Existed: September 18, 1986–present

Loop 110 is located in Christoval.

Loop 110 was designated on September 18, 1986, from US 277 in Christoval, southward approximately 1.4 miles (2.3 km) to US 277, south of Christoval.

== Loop 111 ==
State Highway Loop 111
- Location: Travis County
- Existed: March 22, 1960–present

Loop 111 is located in Austin.

Loop 111 was designated on March 27, 1960, from I-35 at Anderson Lane to US 290 northeast of Austin. Five months later Loop 111 was extended to US 183 near the Montopolis Bridge. On June 10, 1966, the route was transferred to US 183 and Loop 111 was reassigned to its current route along Airport Boulevard from I-35 to US 183. On May 24, 2007, a 1.7-mile (2.7 km) section from I-35 to FM 969 was removed and returned to the city of Austin.

== Loop 113 ==
State Highway Loop 113
- Location: Hidalgo County
- Length: 6.8 mi (10.9 km)
- Existed: April 14, 1980–June 21, 1990

Loop 113 was located in Edinburg.

Loop 113 was designated on April 14, 1980, as a loop off US 281 in Edinburg. On June 21, 1990, Loop 113 was cancelled and redesignated as Bus. US 281.

== Loop 114 ==
State Highway Loop 114
- Location: Jefferson County
- Existed: September 21, 1950–April 1, 1955

Loop 114 was located in Port Arthur.

Loop 114 was designated on September 21, 1950, as a redesignation of Spur 114 when it was extended to US 96/SH 87. The route was signed as Bus. US 96 rather than Loop 114. On April 1, 1955, Loop 114 was cancelled.

== Loop 116 ==
State Highway Loop 116
- Location: Polk County
- Existed: March 6, 1941–present

Loop 116 is located in New Willard.

Loop 116 was designated on March 6, 1941, as a redesignation of Spur 116 when it was extended to US 59 south of New Willard.

== Loop 118 ==
State Highway Loop 118
- Location: Denton County
- Existed: February 4, 1941–present

Loop 118 is located in Roanoke. It is unsigned and a portion of US 377.

Loop 118 was designated on February 4, 1941, from US 377 south of Roanoke to SH 114 north of Roanoke. On September 26, 1996, a 0.625-mile (1.006 km) section from US 377 to Denton Street was returned to the city of Roanoke and Loop 118 was rerouted over Spur 118 to US 377.

== Loop 120 ==
State Highway Loop 120
- Location: Dickens County
- Existed: May 14, 1941–present

Loop 120 is located in Dickens.

Loop 120 was designated on May 14, 1941, from SH 70 south of Dickens, to a point US 62/US 82 west of Dickens. On September 27, 1957, Loop 120 was extended north 1.4 miles (2.3 km) along the old route of SH 70.

== Loop 121 ==
State Highway Loop 121
- Location: Bell County
- Existed: October 31, 1958–present

Loop 121 is a partial beltway around the city of Belton in the U.S. state of Texas.

== Loop 123 ==
State Highway Loop 123
- Location: Lee County
- Existed: September 15, 1941–present

Loop 123 is located in Lexington.

Loop 123 was designated on September 15, 1941, from US 77 northeast of Lexington, eastward through Lexington to a point on US 77 east of Lexington.

== Loop 124 ==
State Highway Loop 124
- Location: Smith County
- Existed: September 15, 1941–present

Loop 124 is located in Tyler. The 1.5-mile-long (2.4 km) route follows the original alignment of SH 64 through the city. It begins at SH 31 (Front Street) on the east side of Tyler. It follows Old Henderson Highway to the southeast to an intersection with Loop 323. The route continues to the southeast to its terminus at SH 64. Old Henderson Highway continues beyond both ends of the highway without the Loop 124 designation.

Loop 124 was designated on September 15, 1941, along the former alignment of SH 64 through Tyler. It was originally designated from the intersection of SH 64 (Dallas Highway) and US 69 (Glenwood Boulevard) east along Erwin Street. It followed Erwin Street until the intersection with Old Henderson Highway, which Loop 124 would follow to its current eastern terminus. On May 30, 1962, the portion west of SH 31 was removed and turned over to the city of Tyler for maintenance.

== Loop 125 ==
State Highway Loop 125
- Location: Washington County
- Existed: September 15, 1941–September 26, 1945

Loop 125 was located in Burton.

Loop 125 was designated on September 15, 1941, as a loop off US 290 in Burton. On September 26, 1945, a section of Loop 125 became a portion of FM 390 and the remainder was changed to Spur 125.

== Loop 127 ==
State Highway Loop 127
- Location: Anderson County
- Existed: October 23, 1941–present

Loop 127 is located in Palestine.

Loop 127 was designated on October 23, 1941, from US 79 east of Palestine to the intersection of US 287 and US 84.

== Loop 128 ==
State Highway Loop 128
- Location: Stonewall County
- Existed: January 25, 1978–present

Loop 128 is located in Old Glory.

Loop 128 was designated on January 25, 1978, from US 380 southwest of Old Glory eastward and northward along the old location of US 380 to US 380 northeast of Old Glory.

== Loop 130 ==
State Highway Loop 130
- Location: Comanche County
- Existed: November 24, 1941–present

Loop 130 is located in Gustine.

Loop 130 was designated on November 24, 1941, from SH 36 west of Gustine, via Gustine and then northward to SH 36.

== Loop 132 ==
State Highway Loop 132
- Location: Young County
- Existed: November 25, 1941–present

Loop 132 is located in Olney.

Loop 132 was designated on November 25, 1941, from SH 114 0.5 miles (0.80 km) west of SH 79 in Olney, southward to SH 79 southwest of Olney.

== Loop 133 ==
State Highway Loop 133
- Location: Hardeman County
- Existed: February 20, 1942–March 12, 1942

Loop 133 was located in Quanah.

Loop 133 was designated on February 20, 1942, as a loop off US 287 in Quanah. Three weeks later the section from US 287 to SH 283 (now SH 6) was removed and the route was changed to Spur 133.

== Loop 137 ==
Loop 137 was a designation applied to two different highways. No highway currently uses the Loop 137 designation.

=== Loop 137 (1942) ===
State Highway Loop 137
- Location: Harris County
- Existed: June 23, 1942–April 14, 1980

The first Loop 137 was designated on June 23, 1942, as a loop off US 90 (now I-10) on Houston's northern side with connections to SH 73. On October 13, 1955, the road was extended west from US 75 (now I-45) to US 90. On August 8, 1960, the road was extended south 4.5 miles (7.2 km) from I-10 to SH 225, completing the loop around Houston. From 1959 the route was co-designated with I-610 and this co-designation was removed on April 14, 1980, cancelling Loop 137.

=== Loop 137 (1983) ===
State Highway Loop 137
- Location: Collin County
- Existed: December 21, 1983–June 21, 1990

The second Loop 137 was designated on December 21, 1983, as a loop off SH 78 in Blue Ridge, replacing the old route of SH 78. On June 21, 1990, Loop 137 was cancelled and redesignated and redesignated as Bus. SH 78.

== Loop 139 ==
State Highway Loop 139
- Location: Yoakum County
- Existed: July 31, 1942–January 5, 1955

Loop 139 was located in Denver City.

Loop 139 was designated on July 31, 1942, as a loop off SH 214 in Denver City. On January 5, 1955, Loop 139 was cancelled and transferred to FM 2055.

== Loop 140 ==
State Highway Loop 140
- Location: Hutchinson County
- Existed: September 22, 1942–April 2, 1969

Loop 140 was located in Borger.

Loop 140 was designated on September 22, 1942, as a loop off SH 117 in Borger. On April 2, 1969, the section from Spur 119 south to SH 207 was cancelled and the route was changed to Spur 140.

== Loop 141 ==
State Highway Loop 141
- Location: Matagorda County
- Existed: September 22, 1942–June 21, 1990

Loop 141 was located in Palacios.

Loop 141 was designated on September 22, 1942, as a loop off SH 35 in Palacios. On June 21, 1990, Loop 141 was cancelled and transferred to Bus. SH 35.

== Loop 142 ==
State Highway Loop 142
- Location: Cherokee County
- Existed: August 28, 1941–present

Loop 142 is located in Ponta.

Loop 142 was designated on August 28, 1941, from SH 110 through Ponta to SH 110.

== Loop 143 ==
State Highway Loop 143
- Location: Ochiltree County
- Existed: November 24, 1959–present

Loop 143 is located in Perryton.

Loop 143 was designated on November 24, 1959, from US 83 in Perryton westward and northward to SH 15. On October 28, 1966, the road was extended east and north from US 83 to SH 15. On October 1, 1958, the road was extended north from SH 15 (west intersection) to FM 1267. On May 1, 1972, the road was extended north and west from SH 15 to US 83.

== Loop 144 ==
State Highway Loop 144
- Location: McCulloch County
- Existed: September 6, 1943–April 30, 1959

Loop 144 was located in Melvin.

Loop 144 was designated on September 6, 1943, as a loop off US 87 in Melvin. On April 30, 1959, Loop 144 was cancelled and removed from the highway system due to completion of FM 2028.

== Loop 145 ==
State Highway Loop 145
- Location: Wilbarger County
- Existed: February 5, 1960–present

Loop 145 is located in Oklaunion.

Loop 145 was designated on February 5, 1960, from US 287 in Oklaunion southward along Kingola Rd and eastward along the old route of US 287 and US 70 to US 287 east of Oklaunion.

== Loop 146 ==
State Highway Loop 146
- Location: Childress County
- Existed: January 18, 1944–March 18, 1947

Loop 146 was located in Childress.

Loop 146 was designated on January 18, 1944, from US 287 in Childress, south and west to US 83. On March 18, 1947, Loop 146 was cancelled and became a portion of FM 94, the same day that the route was signed as FM 94.

== Loop 149 ==
State Highway Loop 149
- Location: Sabine and Jasper counties
- Existed: July 29, 1965–present

Loop 149 is located in Brookeland.

Loop 149 was designated on July 29, 1965, from US 96 northwestward and southward via Brookeland to US 96.

=== Loop 149 (1944) ===
State Highway Loop 149
- Location: Harris County
- Existed: March 30, 1944–March 24, 1954

The original Loop 149 was designated on March 30, 1944, from US 75, 8 miles (13 km) north of Houston, south over former US 75 (US 75 was rerouted to follow North Shepherd Drive) to then-Bus. US 59, then over Bus. US 59 to US 75 in Houston. On March 24, 1954, Loop 149 was cancelled: one section was included in US 75 (which had been rerouted off North Shepherd Drive by 1951) and the remainder turned over to the city of Houston and Harris County. The former route of US 75 became Spur 261 rather than Spur 149 because it was too close to FM 149.

== Loop 150 ==
State Highway Loop 150
- Location: Bastrop County
- Length: 2.409 mi (3.877 km)
- Existed: November 14, 1959–present

Loop 150 is located in Bastrop.

Loop 150 was designated on November 14, 1959, as a loop off SH 71 in Bastrop as a replacement of SH 71 when it was rerouted to the south.

== Loop 151 ==
State Highway Loop 151
- Location: Bowie County
- Existed: August 27, 1958–present

Loop 151 is located in Texarkana.

Loop 151 was designated on August 27, 1958, on the current route.

== Loop 153 ==
State Highway Loop 153
- Location: Rusk County
- Existed: May 18, 1944–June 21, 1990

Loop 153 was located in Henderson. It is now designated as Bus. US 79 and Bus. SH 64.

== Loop 154 ==
State Highway Loop 154
- Location: Rusk County
- Existed: September 14, 1944–June 21, 1990

Loop 154 was located in Henderson. It is now designated as Bus. US 79 and Bus. SH 64.

== Loop 155 ==
State Highway Loop 155
- Location: Zavala County
- Existed: September 14, 1944–present

Loop 155 is located in Crystal City.

Loop 155 was designated on September 14, 1944, from US 83 north of Crystal City following FM 65 to Uvalde St and westward along Uvalde St to US 83 in Crystal City. On July 18, 1958, the road was rerouted from Uvalde St to Lake St.

== Loop 157 ==
State Highway Loop 157
- Location: Shelby County
- Existed: May 29, 1985–present

Loop 157 is located in Tenaha.

Loop 157 was designated on May 29, 1985, from US 59 northeast of Tenaha southwest and south 0.8 miles (1.3 km) to US 84/US 96 as a replacement of a section of Loop 168. On February 19, 1986, the road was extended to US 96, replacing a section of US 96.

=== Loop 157 (1944) ===
State Highway Loop 157
- Location: Victoria County
- Existed: October 24, 1944–January 17, 1984

A previous route numbered Loop 157 was designated in Victoria County on October 24, 1944, from US 59 at Goodwin Avenue in Victoria, via Goodwin Avenue, to US 87 at Goodwin Avenue and Main Street. On November 3, 1962, the route was extended to Navarro Street. On January 17, 1984, Loop 157 was cancelled and returned to the city of Victoria.

== Loop 158 ==
State Highway Loop 158
- Location: Brazos County
- Existed: October 24, 1944–July 15, 1988

Loop 158 was located in Bryan.

Loop 158 was designated on October 24, 1944, from SH 6 (now Loop 507) west to SH 21. On July 15, 1988, Loop 158 was cancelled and transferred to FM 158 when it was rerouted.

== Loop 160 ==
State Highway Loop 160
- Location: Madison County
- Existed: November 6, 1944–present

Loop 160 is located in North Zulch.

Loop 160 was designated on November 6, 1944, from US 190 though North Zulch to US 190.

== Loop 163 ==
State Highway Loop 163
- Location: Blanco County
- Existed: June 1, 1960–present

Loop 163 is located in Blanco. Its southern terminus is at a junction with US 281, just inside the Blanco city limits. The route runs to the north, essentially parallel to the current alignment of US 281. It intersects RM 165 before crossing the Blanco River. Access to the north bank of the river and Blanco State Park is provided by PR 23. Loop 163 turns to the west and reaches its northern terminus at an intersection with US 281 in downtown Blanco. The road continues to the northwest as RM 1623.

Loop 163 was designated on June 1, 1960. It is a former alignment of US 281 through Blanco.

== Loop 165 ==
State Highway Loop 165
- Location: Wichita County
- Existed: November 7, 1958–April 24, 1964

Loop 165 was located in Wichita Falls.

Loop 165 was designated on November 7, 1958, as a renumbering of Loop 281 due to its confusion with US 281. The road was also extended south over old US 281 to US 277/US 281. On April 24, 1964, Loop 165 was cancelled and transferred to SH 240 when it was extended.

== Loop 166 ==
State Highway Loop 166
- Location: Kinney County
- Existed: April 30, 1945–present

Loop 166 is located in Brackettville.

Loop 166 was designated on April 30, 1945, from US 90 east of Brackettville along the old location of US 90 through Brackettville to US 90 west of Brackettville.

== Loop 167 ==
State Highway Loop 167
- Location: Lamar County
- Existed: August 4, 1945–October 25, 1990

Loop 167 was located in Deport.

Loop 167 was designated on August 4, 1945, as a loop off US 271 in Deport. On October 25, 1990, Loop 167 was cancelled and transferred to Bus. US 271.

== Loop 168 ==
State Highway Loop 168
- Location: Shelby County
- Existed: August 23, 1945–present

Loop 168 is a state highway loop in the town of Tenaha in Shelby County, Texas.

== Loop 170 ==
State Highway Loop 170
- Location: Nolan County
- Existed: January 18, 1946–present

Loop 170 is located in Sweetwater.

Loop 170 was designated on January 18, 1946, from US 80 (later Loop 432, now Business I-20-M) southeast of Sweetwater Municipal Airport (then called Avenger Field) through Sweetwater Municipal Airport and then to another point on US 80 (later Loop 432, now Business I-20-M).

== Loop 171 ==
State Highway Loop 171
- Location: Gray County
- Length: 7.203 mi (Note: The certified length given is shorter than the actual mileage, as the Texas Department of Transportation description of Loop 171 considers it to be discontinuous at rather than concurrent with SH 273.) (11.592 km)
- Existed: October 31, 1958–present

Loop 171 is located in Pampa.

Loop 171 was designated on October 31, 1958, from US 60 approximately 1.5 miles (2.4 km) east of Pampa south to SH 273. On November 10, 1961, the road was extended south and west to SH 70. On November 16, 1968, the road was extended northwest from US 60 to SH 70.

Junction list

The entire route is in Gray County.

Location	mi	km	Destinations	Notes
	0.0	0.0	SH 70 – Pampa, Clarendon	
	1.0	1.6	SH 273 north / FM 749 south – Pampa, Bowers City	South end of SH 273 overlap
	3.0	4.8	SH 273 south – Lefors	North end of SH 273 overlap
	5.0	8.0	US 60 – Pampa, Miami, Wheeler	
	9.2	14.8	SH 70 – Pampa, Perryton	
1.000 mi = 1.609 km; 1.000 km = 0.621 mi: Concurrency terminus

== Loop 173 ==
State Highway Loop 173
- Location: Wood County
- Existed: March 21, 1946–present

Loop 173 is located in Quitman.

Loop 173 was designated on March 21, 1946, from SH 37 near the Quitman Court House to SH 37 east of Quitman.

== Loop 175 ==
=== Loop 175 (1946) ===
State Highway Loop 175
- Location: Coleman County
- Existed: May 15, 1946–October 24, 1955

The first use of the Loop 175 designation was in Coleman County, from US 84, 1.5 miles (2.4 km) southeast of Coleman west to Commercial Avenue near the south side of Coleman, then south 1 mile (1.6 km) to US 67 near Coleman Airport with a spur connection along Commercial Avenue into Coleman. On September 26, 1947, the route was revised after US 67 was rerouted. Loop 175 was cancelled on October 24, 1955, and transferred to FM 568.

=== Loop 175 (1958) ===
State Highway Loop 175
- Location: Victoria County
- Existed: March 26, 1958–January 26, 1995

The next use of the Loop 175 designation was in Victoria County as a loop off US 59 around the south side of Victoria. On January 26, 1995, Loop 175 was cancelled and transferred to US 59 when it was rerouted; the original route of US 59 became Bus. US 59.

== Loop 177 ==
State Highway Loop 177
- Location: Polk County
- Existed: July 31, 1946–present

Loop 177 is located in Moscow.

Loop 177 was designated on March 21, 1946, from US 59 south of Moscow, northwestward along a county road to the old location of US 59 and then along the old location of US 59 approximate 0.4 miles (0.64 km), and then eastward to US 59. On November 5, 1952, one section was transferred to FM 1643, which was cancelled and combined with FM 350 on February 21, 1958 (note that FM 1643 has since been reassigned elsewhere).

== Loop 178 ==
State Highway Loop 178
- Location: Hunt County
- Existed: August 28, 1958–present

Loop 178 is located in Commerce. Its western terminus is at SH 224 in the western part of the city. It runs southeast and then east to an intersection with SH 24 and SH 11. From here, Loop 178 and SH 11 run concurrent eastbound, intersecting FM 3218. Loop 178 ends at Bus. SH 11, while SH 11 continues to the southeast. The Loop 178 designation extends to the northeast from this point, to another junction with SH 24, but this section has not been constructed as of 2022.

The current Loop 178 was designated on August 28, 1958, as Spur 178, going from SH 11 westward and northward to SH 24. On May 1, 1965, the section from the current junction of SH 11 and SH 24 (then the junction with FM 513) that was concurrent with FM 513 was transferred to the new SH 50. On July 10, 1968, the route was extended west to SH 224 (then SH 24), and north and northwest to SH 24, and the designation was changed to Loop 178.

== Loop 179 ==
State Highway Loop 179
- Location: Camp County
- Existed: December 19, 1979–present

Loop 179 is located in Pittsburg.

Loop 179 was designated on December 19, 1979, from SH 11 west of Pittsburg north and northeast to US 271 north of Pittsburg.

=== Loop 179 (1946) ===
State Highway Loop 179
- Location: Erath County
- Existed: November 8, 1946–April 6, 1970

The original Loop 179 was designated on November 8, 1946, from US 281 south of Stephenville to US 67 just south of the Bosque River, then along US 67 to US 377 in Stephenville, then east along US 377 to US 281/US 377 east of Stephenville. On August 28, 1948, Loop 179 was erroneously cancelled, but was shortly corrected to go from US 281 to US 67 only. On July 16, 1965, the road was extended north along old US 67 to Loop 195 (now Bus. US 377). Loop 179 was cancelled for real on April 6, 1970, and redesignated as an extension of SH 108.

== Loop 180 ==
State Highway Loop 180
- Location: Hill County
- Existed: November 8, 1946–July 21, 1961

Loop 180 was located in Whitney.

Loop 180 was designated on November 8, 1946, as a loop off then-proposed SH 22 in Whitney. On July 21, 1961, the section from FM 933 south to SH 22 was transferred to FM 933 and the route was changed to Spur 180.

== Loop 181 ==
State Highway Loop 181
- Location: Wilson County
- Existed: October 15, 1946–present

Loop 181 is located in Floresville.

Loop 181 was designated on October 15, 1946, from US 181 south through Floresville to US 181.

== Loop 182 ==
State Highway Loop 182
- Location: Parker County
- Existed: December 10, 1946–present

Loop 182 is located in Springtown.

Loop 182 was designated on December 10, 1946, from FM 51 in Springtown to west to SH 199.

== Loop 183 ==
State Highway Loop 183
- Location: Wharton County
- Existed: July 9, 1970–October 29, 1998

Loop 183 was located in Hungerford and Wharton.

Loop 183 was designated on July 9, 1970, as a loop off US 59 in Hungerford as a replacement of US 59 when it was rerouted. The route was signed as Bus. US 59 rather than Loop 183. On June 30, 1976, the road was extended south and southwest along old US 59 to US 59 south of Wharton; this extension was also signed as Bus. US 59. Loop 183 was cancelled on October 29, 1998, by district request and redesignated as Bus. US 59.

== Loop 184 ==
State Highway Loop 184
- Location: Harris County
- Existed: June 21, 1978–June 21, 1990

Loop 184 was located in Humble.

Loop 184 was designated on June 21, 1978, as a loop off FM 1960 in Humble as a replacement for FM 1960 after it was rerouted. On June 21, 1990, Loop 184 was cancelled and transferred to Business FM 1960-A.

== Loop 187 ==
State Highway Loop 187
- Location: Jack County
- Existed: January 18, 1960–present

Loop 187 is located in Antelope.

Loop 187 was designated on January 18, 1960, from US 281 west of Antelope, east and south through Antelope to US 281.

=== Loop 187 (1947) ===
State Highway Loop 187
- Location: Denton County
- Existed: April 30, 1947–June 30, 1955

The original Loop 187 was designated on April 30, 1947, from new US 77 in Lewisville east to new SH 121 east of Lewisville. Loop 187 was cancelled on June 30, 1955, and became a portion of FM 1171.

== Loop 193 ==
State Highway Loop 193
- Location: Lubbock County
- Existed: January 18, 1960–present

Loop 193 is located in Wolfforth.

Loop 193 was designated on January 18, 1960, from US 62 in Wolfforth, northward along the old route of US 62 through Wolfforth to US 62.

== Loop 195 ==
State Highway Loop 195
- Location: Starr County
- Existed: September 26, 2013–present

Loop 195 is a proposed route in Rio Grande City. It was designated three months before Spur 195, and is the only case when a loop and spur have the same number and are not in the same city.

Loop 195 was designated on September 26, 2013, from US 83 at Loma Blanca Road to FM 755 northeast of Rio Grande City, a distance of approximately 17.4 miles.

=== Loop 195 (1960) ===
State Highway Loop 195
- Location: Erath County
- Existed: August 23, 1960–June 21, 1990

The original Loop 195 was designated on August 23, 1960, from US 67 west of Stephenville to US 281 near Stephenville Municipal Airport. On July 1, 1962, the road was extended to US 377. On July 16, 1965, the road was rerouted along old US 377 to US 67/US 377 west of Stephenville and signed as Bus. US 377. Loop 195 was cancelled on June 21, 1990, and transferred to Bus. US 377.

== Loop 197 ==
State Highway Loop 197
- Location: Galveston County
- Existed: February 5, 1960–September 27, 2012

Loop 197 was located in Texas City.

Loop 197 was designated on February 5, 1960, as a loop off SH 146 in Texas City as a replacement for SH 146 when it was rerouted west of town. On September 27, 2012, the section from SH 146 east to 19th Avenue was removed from the highway system and returned to Texas City and the remainder was changed to Spur 197.

== Loop 198 ==
State Highway Loop 198
- Location: San Patricio County
- Existed: December 17, 1947–June 21, 1990

Loop 198 was located in Mathis.

Loop 198 was designated on December 17, 1947, from US 59 southeast of Mathis via Mathis to SH 9/US 59 northeast of Mathis. This was formerly SH 9 and US 59 before they were rerouted to bypass Mathis. Loop 198 was cancelled on June 21, 1990, and transferred to Bus. SH 359.
