= Coldwater, Dallam County, Texas =

Unincorporated community in Texas, US

Coldwater, Texas
- Unincorporated community
- Location within the state of Texas
- Coordinates: 36°27′18″N 102°36′40″W
- Country: United States
- State: Texas
- County: Dallam
- Elevation: 4,183 ft (1,275 m)

Population (2000)
  - Total: 53
- Time zone: UTC-6 (Central (CST))
  - Summer (DST): UTC-5 (CDT)
- ZIP codes: 79022
- Area code: 806
- GNIS feature ID: 1381678

For other places named Coldwater in Texas, see Coldwater, Texas.

Coldwater is an unincorporated community in Dallam County, Texas, United States. According to the Handbook of Texas, the community had a population of 53 in 2000.

== History ==
Coldwater comprised a store and several scattered houses in 1947. The city of Dalhart delivered mail to the community. Its decline began in 1950. Its population was 53 in 2000.

== Geography ==
Coldwater is located near Coldwater Creek on Farm to Market Road 296 and three miles west of U.S. Route 385, 29 mi (47 km) east of Texline and three miles south of the Oklahoma Panhandle in northern Dallam County.

== Education ==
Coldwater's school joined others in the county in the 1950s and became a community center for farmers and ranchers. Today, the community is served by the Texline Independent School District.
