= Holly Jeffreys =

American politician

Member-elect of the Texas House of Representatives from the 86th district
- Assuming office January 12, 2027
- Succeeding: John T. Smithee

Personal details
- Party: Republican

Holly Jeffreys is an American politician. A member of the Republican Party, she is the member-elect for the 86th district of the Texas House of Representatives.
