= Doole, Texas =

- Unincorporated Community
- Location within Texas
- Coordinates: 31°23′45″N 99°35′56″W
- Country: United States
- State: Texas
- County: McCulloch
- Elevation: 1,509 ft (460 m)
- Time zone: UTC-6 (Central (CST))
  - Summer (DST): UTC-5 (CDT)
- ZIP codes: 76836
- Area code: 325
- GNIS feature ID: 1356161

Doole is an unincorporated community in McCulloch County, Texas, United States. The community had an estimated population of 74 in 1990. Current population is 3 as of 2025

== Notable person ==
Rodeo performer and promoter Dan Collins Taylor was born in Doole in 1923, and died there in 2010.

== Geography ==
Doole is situated at the junction of Farm Roads 503 and 765 in northwestern McCulloch County, approximately 12 miles north of U.S. Highway 87 and 28 miles northwest of Brady. The nearest large city is San Angelo, 55 miles west of Doole.

== History ==
A ranching community called Gansel, after a prominent local family, was the area's first settlement. It developed around Crossroads School, which had moved to the area from Fort Concho in 1908. Around 1911, residents decided to establish a post office and asked Brady's postmaster – David Doole, Jr. - for advice. The postal service in Washington, DC, rejected the name Gansel. In appreciation of Mr. Doole's assistance, local residents decided to name the community after him. By 1914, Doole had an estimated population of 25. In 1936, East Gansel School closed and students were transferred to Doole. That year, another community, Stacy, began sending students to Doole, as well. Doole was home to 250 people by the 1940s. At this time, students attended elementary school through the sixth grade in Doole, while secondary students were bused to Melvin. The community began to decline after World War II, mainly because of the consolidation of small family farms. A drought in the 1950s caused many farmers to leave the area in search of greater job opportunities. During the mid-1960s, Doole's population had fallen to 40. That figure had risen to around 74 in 1970 and remained at that level throughout the rest of the 20th century.

Although Doole is unincorporated, it has a post office, with the ZIP code 76836.

== Education ==
Public education in the community of Doole is provided by the Brady Independent School District.
