= Dallam County, Texas =

County in Texas, United States

- County
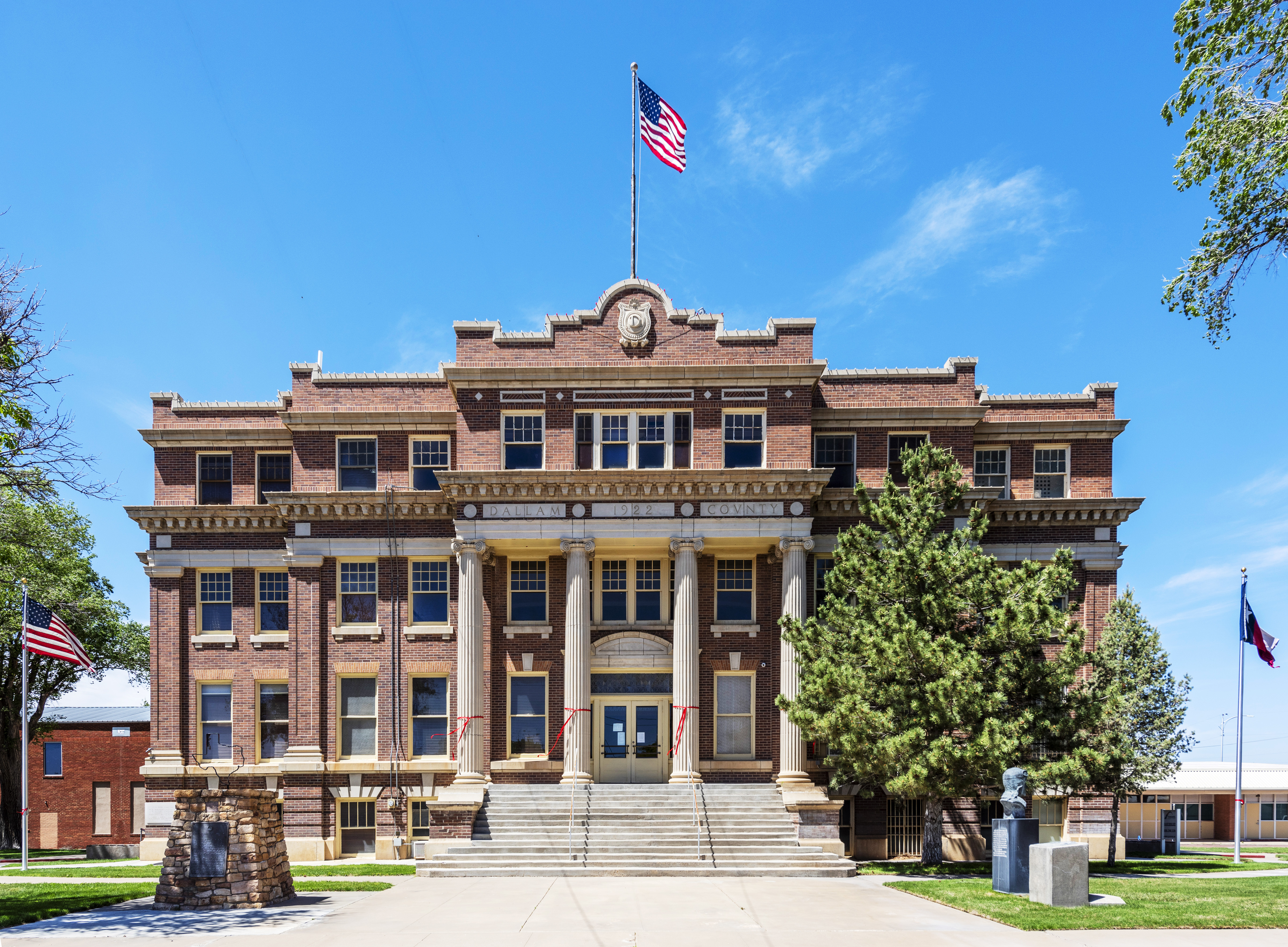
- 1922 Dallam County Courthouse in Dalhart

- Location within the U.S. state of Texas
- Coordinates: 36°17′N 102°35′W
- Country: United States
- State: Texas
- Founded: 1891
- Seat: Dalhart
- Largest city: Dalhart

Area
  - Total: 1,505 sq mi (3,900 km^{2})
  - Land: 1,503 sq mi (3,890 km^{2})
  - Water: 2.0 sq mi (5.2 km^{2}) 0.1%

Population (2020)
  - Total: 7,115
  - Estimate (2025): 7,508 ▲
  - Density: 4.7/sq mi (1.8/km^{2})
- Time zone: UTC−6 (Central)
  - Summer (DST): UTC−5 (CDT)
- Congressional district: 13th
- Website: www.dallam.org

Dallam County is the north-westernmost county in the U.S. state of Texas. As of the 2020 Census, its population was 7,115. Its county seat is Dalhart. The county was founded in 1876 and later organized in 1891. It is named for James Wilmer Dallam, a lawyer and newspaper publisher.

== History ==
Dallam County was formed in 1876 from portions of Bexar County. It was named after James Wilmer Dallam, the lawyer who made the first digest of Texas laws. The first settlement in the area followed in 1870, which resulted in the Red River War of 1874 and 1875 with the native Comanche and Kiowa tribes. In 1900–01, the Chicago, Rock Island and Pacific Railroad company built a stretch from Liberal, Kansas, to Tucumcari, New Mexico, which ran through the county. The location where the tracks met those of the Fort Worth and Denver Railway was named Dalhart. The name is taken from the first letters of Dallam County and Hartley County, between which the town's area is divided. Within a short time, the small railroad stop turned into a sizable town and was named county seat in 1903.

Dallam County was one of the hardest-hit areas in the Dust Bowl.

== Geography ==
According to the U.S. Census Bureau, the county has a total area of 1,505 square miles (3,900 km^{2}), of which 1,503 square miles (3,890 km^{2}) are land and 2.0 square miles (5.2 km^{2}) (0.1%) are covered by water.

Dallam County is one of only three counties in Texas to border two other U.S. states (the others being Bowie and Cass). Dallam County forms part of the tripoint—of Texas-Oklahoma-New Mexico.

=== Major highways ===
- U.S. Highway 54
- U.S. Highway 87
- U.S. Highway 287
- U.S. Highway 385
- State Highway 102
- Spur 17
- Spur 24

=== Adjacent counties ===
- Cimarron County, Oklahoma (north)
- Sherman County (east)
- Moore County (southeast)
- Hartley County (south)
- Union County, New Mexico (west)

=== National protected area ===
- Rita Blanca National Grassland (part)

== Demographics ==
Historical population
Census	Pop.	Note	%±
1890	112		—
1900	146		30.4%
1910	4,001		2,640.4%
1920	4,528		13.2%
1930	7,830		72.9%
1940	6,494		−17.1%
1950	7,640		17.6%
1960	6,302		−17.5%
1970	6,012		−4.6%
1980	6,531		8.6%
1990	5,461		−16.4%
2000	6,222		13.9%
2010	6,703		7.7%
2020	7,115		6.1%
2025 (est.)	7,508	▲	5.5%
U.S. Decennial Census; 1850–2010 2010 2020

=== Racial and ethnic composition ===
Dallam County, Texas – Racial and ethnic composition Note: the US Census treats Hispanic/Latino as an ethnic category. This table excludes Latinos from the racial categories and assigns them to a separate category. Hispanics/Latinos may be of any race.
Race / Ethnicity (NH = Non-Hispanic)	Pop 1980	Pop 1990	Pop 2000	Pop 2010	Pop 2020	% 1980	% 1990	% 2000	% 2010	% 2020
White alone (NH)	5,211	4,157	4,257	3,726	3,119	79.79%	76.12%	68.42%	55.59%	43.84%
Black or African American alone (NH)	155	102	100	81	74	2.37%	1.87%	1.61%	1.21%	1.04%
Native American or Alaska Native alone (NH)	43	31	35	34	51	0.66%	0.57%	0.56%	0.51%	0.72%
Asian alone (NH)	28	14	13	37	10	0.43%	0.26%	0.21%	0.55%	0.14%
Native Hawaiian or Pacific Islander alone (NH)	x	x	0	5	3	x	x	0.00%	0.07%	0.04%
Other race alone (NH)	4	6	1	17	10	0.06%	0.11%	0.02%	0.25%	0.14%
Mixed race or Multiracial (NH)	x	x	50	86	141	x	x	0.80%	1.28%	1.98%
Hispanic or Latino (any race)	1,090	1,151	1,766	2,717	3,707	16.69%	21.08%	28.38%	40.53%	52.10%
Total	6,531	5,461	6,222	6,703	7,115	100.00%	100.00%	100.00%	100.00%	100.00%

=== 2020 census ===
As of the 2020 census, the county had a population of 7,115. The median age was 32.3 years. 29.4% of residents were under the age of 18 and 11.5% of residents were 65 years of age or older. For every 100 females there were 112.9 males, and for every 100 females age 18 and over there were 117.7 males age 18 and over.

The racial makeup of the county was 54.5% White, 1.1% Black or African American, 1.7% American Indian and Alaska Native, 0.2% Asian, <0.1% Native Hawaiian and Pacific Islander, 18.7% from some other race, and 23.8% from two or more races. Hispanic or Latino residents of any race comprised 52.1% of the population.

76.7% of residents lived in urban areas, while 23.3% lived in rural areas.

There were 2,546 households in the county, of which 39.8% had children under the age of 18 living in them. Of all households, 48.1% were married-couple households, 24.3% were households with a male householder and no spouse or partner present, and 20.6% were households with a female householder and no spouse or partner present. About 23.8% of all households were made up of individuals and 8.5% had someone living alone who was 65 years of age or older.

There were 3,039 housing units, of which 16.2% were vacant. Among occupied housing units, 57.8% were owner-occupied and 42.2% were renter-occupied. The homeowner vacancy rate was 2.1% and the rental vacancy rate was 12.7%.

=== 2000 census ===
As of the 2000 census, 6,222 people, 2,317 households, and 1,628 families were residing in the county. The population density was 4 people per square mile (1.5 people/km^{2}). The 2,697 housing units had an average density of 2 units per square mile (0.77/km^{2}). The racial makeup of the county was 82.64% White, 1.64% Black or African American, 0.90% Native American, 0.21% Asian, 12.41% from other races, and 2.20% from two or more races. About 28.38% of the population were Hispanics or Latinos of any race. About 19.6% were German, 8.2% were Irish, 7.1% were English, 5.5% were American, 2.8% were French, 2.7% were Scotch-Irish, and 1.6% were Dutch in ancestry.

Of the 2,317 households, 39.0% had children under 18 living with them, 55.1% were married couples living together, 9.7% had a female householder with no husband present, and 29.7% were not families. About 26.2% of all households were made up of individuals, and 10.0% had someone living alone who was 65 or older. The average household size was 2.68 and the average family size was 3.24.

In the county, the age distribution was 31.8% under 18, 8.6% from 18 to 24, 28.8% from 25 to 44, 20.60% from 45 to 64, and 10.3% who were 65 or older. The median age was 31 years. For every 100 females, there were 102.00 males. For every 100 females 18 and over, there were 101.30 males.

The median income for a household in the county was $27,946, and for a family was $33,558. Males had a median income of $27,244 versus $19,000 for females. The per capita income for the county was $13,653. About 11.3% of families and 14.1% of the population were below the poverty line, including 15.4% of those under 18 and 24.8% of those 65 or over.

== Politics ==
Dallam County is located within District 86 of the Texas House of Representatives. The seat has been held by Amarillo attorney John T. Smithee, a Republican, since 1985. Dallam County is located within District 31 of the Texas Senate. Dallam County as a whole is heavily Republican in orientation. Kamala Harris's 10.50% showing in the 2024 election was the lowest percentage of the vote a Democrat has received in the county since its organization in 1891.

United States presidential election results for Dallam County, Texas
Year	Republican		Democratic		Third party(ies)	
Year	No.	%	No.	%	No.	%
1912	18	5.28%	247	72.43%	76	22.29%
1916	81	16.53%	363	74.08%	46	9.39%
1920	195	26.49%	478	64.95%	63	8.56%
1924	254	24.31%	506	48.42%	285	27.27%
1928	618	53.00%	539	46.23%	9	0.77%
1932	341	14.83%	1,935	84.13%	24	1.04%
1936	220	12.74%	1,436	83.15%	71	4.11%
1940	427	21.63%	1,539	77.96%	8	0.41%
1944	323	20.06%	1,118	69.44%	169	10.50%
1948	399	20.54%	1,504	77.41%	40	2.06%
1952	1,464	54.77%	1,197	44.78%	12	0.45%
1956	1,018	48.41%	1,074	51.07%	11	0.52%
1960	961	53.15%	835	46.18%	12	0.66%
1964	700	39.80%	1,058	60.15%	1	0.06%
1968	990	49.30%	588	29.28%	430	21.41%
1972	1,271	78.02%	327	20.07%	31	1.90%
1976	936	46.64%	1,029	51.27%	42	2.09%
1980	965	58.88%	632	38.56%	42	2.56%
1984	1,594	75.80%	496	23.59%	13	0.62%
1988	1,205	64.72%	645	34.64%	12	0.64%
1992	922	54.78%	434	25.79%	327	19.43%
1996	970	59.36%	483	29.56%	181	11.08%
2000	1,385	79.42%	341	19.55%	18	1.03%
2004	1,473	82.66%	305	17.12%	4	0.22%
2008	1,269	79.86%	302	19.01%	18	1.13%
2012	1,248	81.36%	253	16.49%	33	2.15%
2016	1,261	81.67%	222	14.38%	61	3.95%
2020	1,389	86.33%	197	12.24%	23	1.43%
2024	1,285	88.80%	152	10.50%	10	0.69%

United States Senate election results for Dallam County, Texas1
Year	Republican		Democratic		Third party(ies)	
Year	No.	%	No.	%	No.	%
2024	1,229	86.25%	158	11.09%	38	2.67%

United States Senate election results for Dallam County, Texas2
Year	Republican		Democratic		Third party(ies)	
Year	No.	%	No.	%	No.	%
2020	1,369	85.83%	200	12.54%	26	1.63%

Texas Gubernatorial election results for Dallam County
Year	Republican		Democratic		Third party(ies)	
Year	No.	%	No.	%	No.	%
2022	391	80.95%	78	16.15%	14	2.90%

== Education ==
The following school districts serve Dallam County:

- Dalhart Independent School District
- Stratford Independent School District
- Texline Independent School District

Dallam County is in the service area of Frank Phillips College (known in legislation as Borger Junior College).

== Communities ==
=== City ===
- Dalhart (county seat) (partly in Hartley County)

=== Town ===
- Texline

=== Unincorporated communities ===
- Coldwater
- Conlen
- Kerrick

=== Ghost towns ===
- Chamberlin
- Perico
- Ware

== Gallery ==
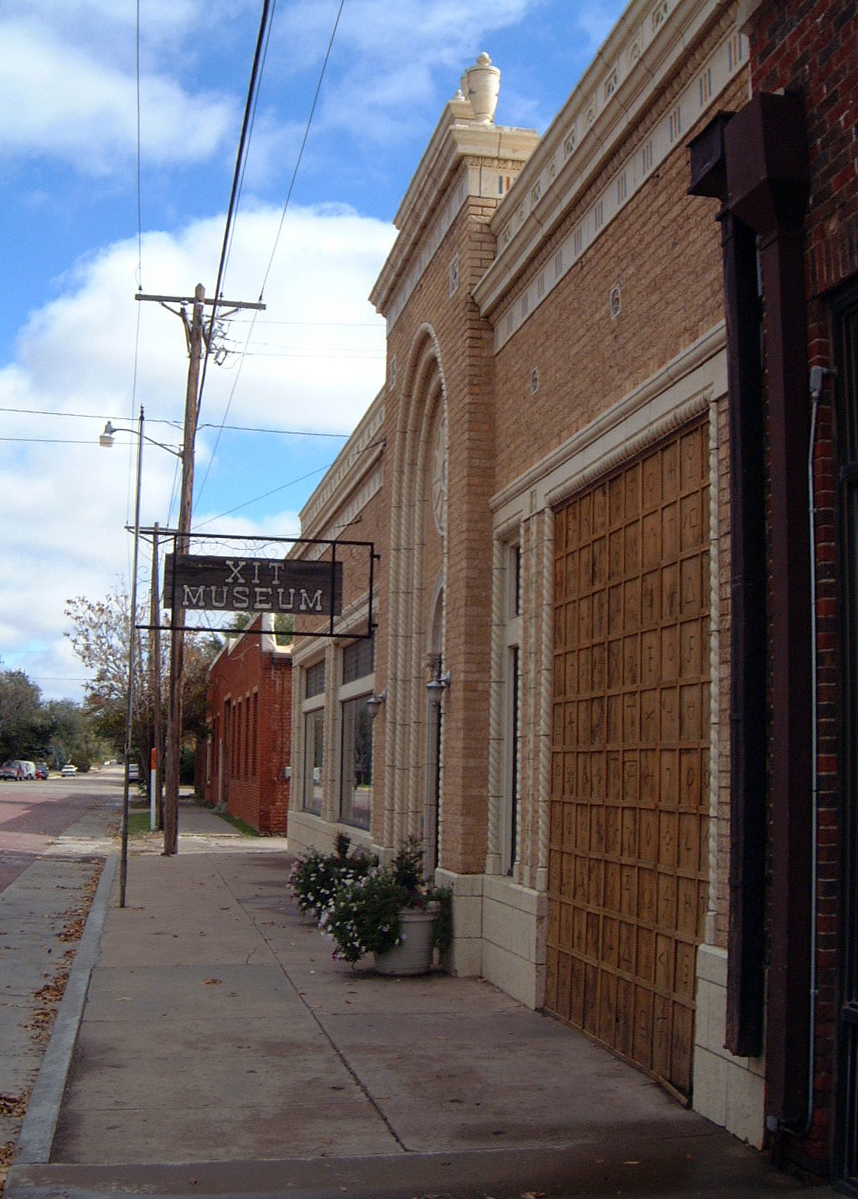
XIT Museum in Dalhart

Area affected by 1930s Dust Bowl

== See also ==
- List of museums in the Texas Panhandle
- National Register of Historic Places listings in Dallam County, Texas
- Recorded Texas Historic Landmarks in Dallam County
- The XIT Ranch claims to have been the largest range in the world "under fence"
