= Coldwater, Wood County, Texas =

Ghost town in Texas, United States

Coordinates: 32°53′53″N 95°14′38″W

For other places named Coldwater in Texas, see Coldwater, Texas.

Coldwater is a ghost town in Wood County, Texas, United States. It was founded in 1880. There is a church and a cemetery.
