= Coldwater, Texas =

Coldwater, Texas may refer to:

- Coldwater, Dallam County, Texas
- Coldwater, Sherman County, Texas
- Coldwater, Wood County, Texas
