= Bo Coleman =

American former radio personality

- Born: Gerald Marlin Coleman; July 1, 1936 (age 90); Wilson, Texas, U.S.
- Education: Texas Tech University
- Occupation: Radio personality

Gerald Marlin "Jerry Bo" Coleman (born July 1, 1936) is an American former radio personality.

Born in Wilson, Texas, the son of Grover and Christeen Coleman. Coleman worked on cotton as a teenager. He worked at the RC Bottling Company. He attended at the Texas Tech University. After listening to the radio, Coleman had gotten his love passion when he listed to the country music station KLLL-FM.

Coleman was hired to work as a radio personality for the KDUB-FM. He then worked for the KSEL-FM. As a radio personality, Coleman had his own radio program that became popular in Lubbock, Texas, in which his program had captivated audiences that included young males and females. He had worked as a radio personality for KDAV, in which he had his own radio program. Coleman resided to Los Angeles, California and currently resides in Lubbock, Texas.
