= Perico, Texas =

Unincorporated community in Texas, US

- Unincorporated community
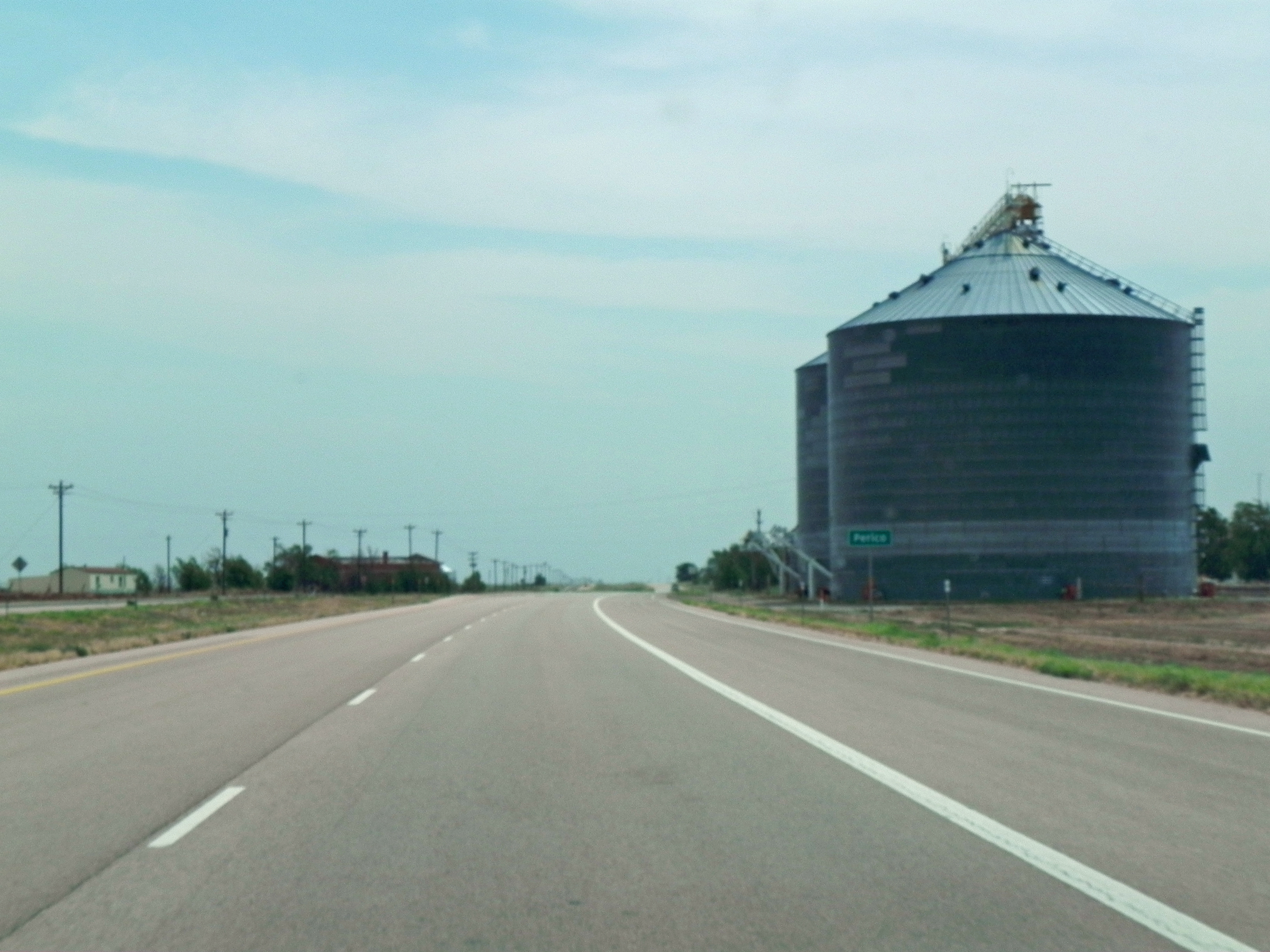

- Location in Texas
- Coordinates: 36°16′35″N 102°51′52″W
- Country: United States
- State: Texas
- County: Dallam
- Settled: 1888

Population (1980)
  - Total: 2

Perico, formerly known as Farwell, is an unincorporated community in Dallam County, Texas, United States.

== History ==
Perico is situated on U.S. Route 87. It was first settled in 1888 as a shipping point for the Fort Worth and Denver Railway, and was named Farwell (not to be confused with the current Farwell, Texas), after the line camp in the XIT Ranch. In 1905, the town was renamed to Perico, as suggested by George Finday. A post office was established in November 1907, and was closed by 1970. In 1980, the community had two residents, down from 40 in the 1960s.
