= James Wilmer Dallam =

American legal scholar (1818–1847)

James Wilmer Dallam (1818–1847) was an American legal scholar and writer. He is the namesake of Dallam County, Texas.

== Biography ==
Dallam was born September 24, 1818, in Baltimore, Maryland, to Francis Johnson and Sarah (Wilmer) Dallam. He attended Brown University and graduated in 1837, and was subsequently elected to Phi Beta Kappa. Then he went to Reverdy Johnson's office to study law. In 1839, he went to Matagorda, Texas, and stayed for a while to compile a book on Texas' laws, titled as A Digest of the Laws of Texas, it was sometimes referred to as "the lawyer's bible", and was republished in 1881, 1883, and 1904. In 1845, he moved back to Matagorda, where he married Annie Fisher, daughter of Samuel Rhoads Fisher. They had one daughter. In July 1846, he founded the Colorado Herald and edited it for a brief period before his death on August 20, 1847.

== Selected works ==
- A digest of the laws of Texas: containing a full and complete compilation of the land laws; together with the opinions of the Supreme court [1840-44]. (Baltimore: J. D. Toy, 1845).
- The Lone star: a tale of Texas, founded upon incidents in the history of Texas (New York; Philadelphia: E. Ferrett, 1845).
- The deaf spy: a tale founded upon incidents in the history of Texas. (Baltimore: W. Taylor, 1848).
- Opinions of the Supreme Court of Texas from 1840 to 1844 inclusive. (St. Louis: The Gilbert Book Co., 1883).
