= Wilson, Texas =

- City
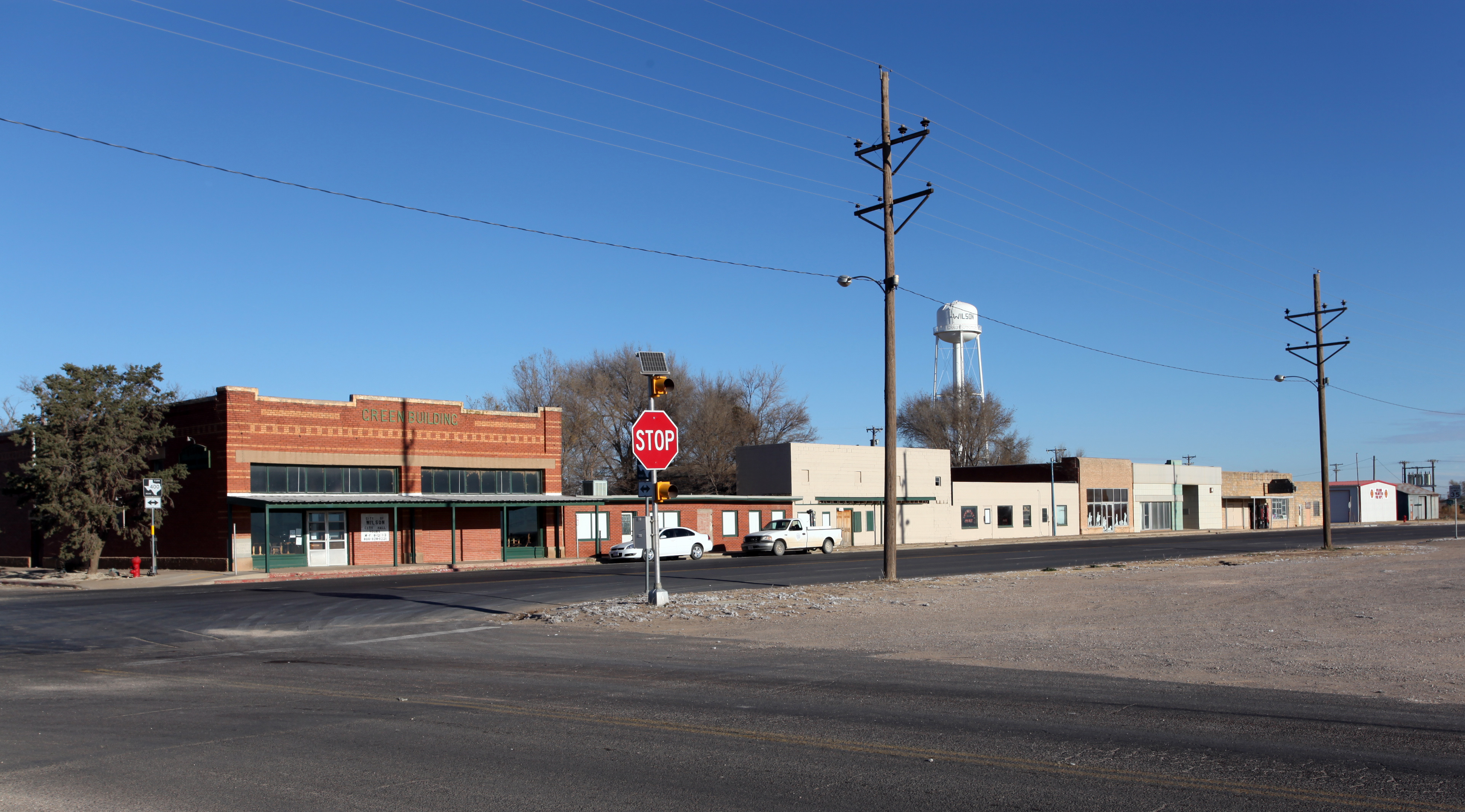
- The Green Building in downtown Wilson

- Location in Texas Location in the United States
- Coordinates: 33°19′01″N 101°43′27″W
- Country: United States
- State: Texas
- County: Lynn
- Region: Llano Estacado
- Established: 1912
- Founder: William Dickson Green

Area
  - Total: 0.64 sq mi (1.67 km^{2})
  - Land: 0.64 sq mi (1.67 km^{2})
- Elevation: 3,120 ft (950 m)

Population (2020)
  - Total: 434
  - Density: 673/sq mi (260/km^{2})
- Time zone: UTC-6 (CST)
- ZIP code: 79381
- Area code: 806
- FIPS code: 48-79612
- Website: wilsontexas.com

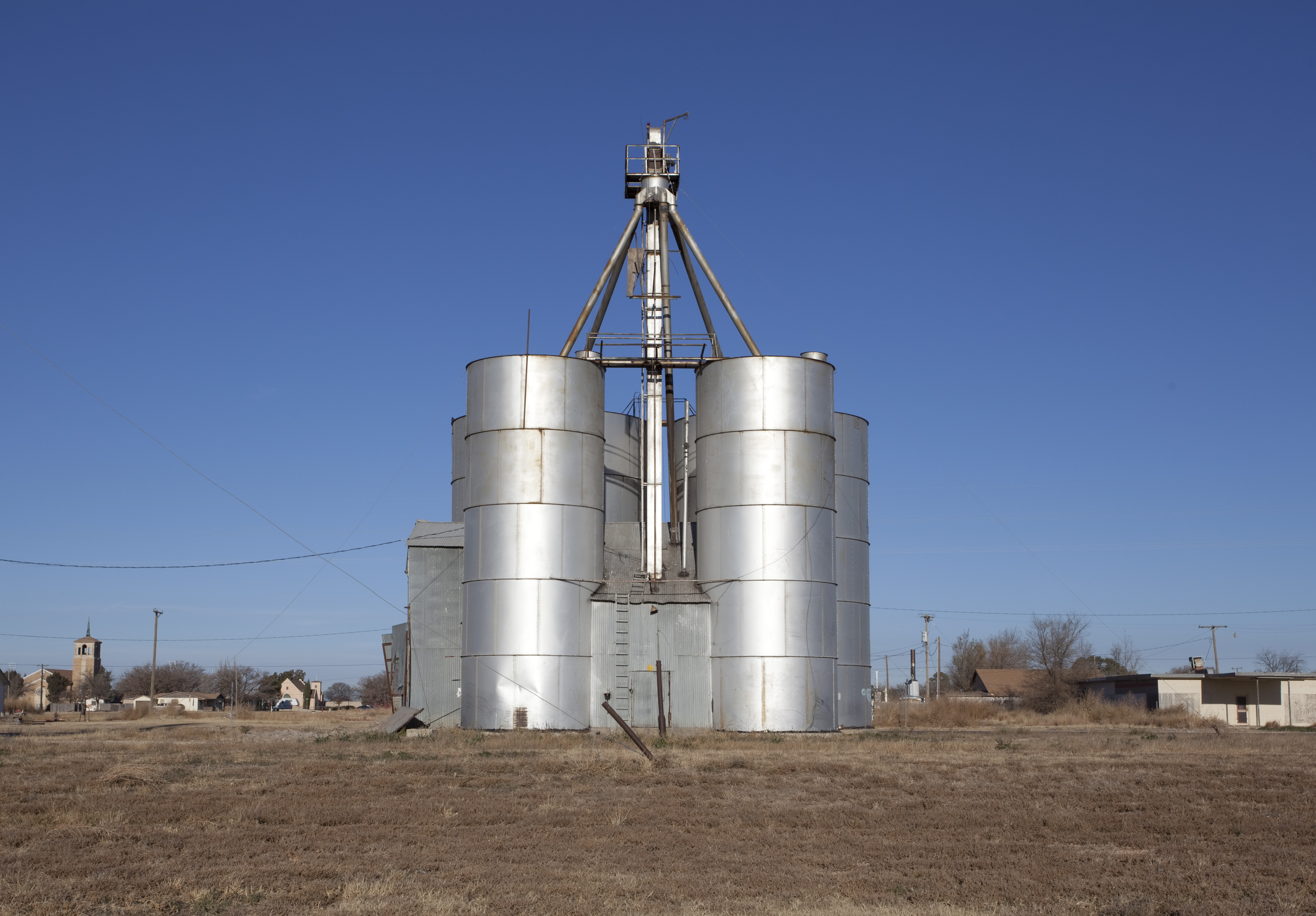
Grain silos on the south side of Wilson

Wilson is a small rural city in northeastern Lynn County, Texas, United States. As of the 2020 census, the population was 434.

== History ==
The town of Wilson was established in 1912 by William Dickson Green of Shiner, Texas, and Lonnie Lumsden. Early settlers included German and Polish emigrant farmers who acquired property on former Wilson County School lands located in Lynn County, hence the city's name.

Wilson was founded in anticipation that the Panhandle and Santa Fe Railway would lay tracks through the area. The Panhandle and Santa Fe Railway Company was one of the two major operating subsidiaries of the Atchison, Topeka and Santa Fe Railway Company (Santa Fe) in Texas, with lines crossing the Texas Panhandle and South Plains regions, as well as a line across the Trans-Pecos to Presidio. A branch line between Slaton Junction and Lamesa was constructed in 1911, and this line would pass directly through Wilson.

In 1917, William Green built the "Green Building" that housed a mercantile store that quickly became the center of activity in this small town. The couple most involved in operating the store were Mr. and Mrs. J.T. Williams, who managed the store from 1916 to 1936, when Mr. Williams died. Mrs. Williams continued to manage the store for another few years until the early 1940s. In 1963, the citizens of Wilson celebrated the renovation of the Green Building, and today, the refurbished building serves as the city hall and historical museum, and continues to be a community gathering spot.

== Geography ==
Wilson rests upon the level High Plains of the Llano Estacado in West Texas. It is situated at the intersection of Farm to Market Road 400 and Farm to Market Road 211. Farm to Market Road 400 runs parallel to the tracks of the former Panhandle and Santa Fe Railway. This branch line was abandoned in 1999 and Wilson no longer has access to rail transport.

It is located at 33°19′01″N 101°43′27″W (33.3170352, –101.7240454). Wilson is 11 miles (18 km) northeast of Tahoka, the Lynn county seat.

According to the United States Census Bureau, the city has a total area of 0.6 square miles (1.6 km^{2}), all land.

== Demographics ==
Historical population
Census	Pop.	Note	%±
1960	403		—
1970	433		7.4%
1980	578		33.5%
1990	568		−1.7%
2000	532		−6.3%
2010	489		−8.1%
2020	434		−11.2%
U.S. Decennial Census

=== 2020 census ===
As of the 2020 census, Wilson had a population of 434. The median age was 41.4 years. 25.6% of residents were under the age of 18 and 18.2% of residents were 65 years of age or older. For every 100 females there were 95.5 males, and for every 100 females age 18 and over there were 95.8 males age 18 and over.

0.0% of residents lived in urban areas, while 100.0% lived in rural areas.

There were 166 households in Wilson, of which 33.1% had children under the age of 18 living in them. Of all households, 48.2% were married-couple households, 19.9% were households with a male householder and no spouse or partner present, and 26.5% were households with a female householder and no spouse or partner present. About 21.0% of all households were made up of individuals and 10.2% had someone living alone who was 65 years of age or older.

There were 212 housing units, of which 21.7% were vacant. The homeowner vacancy rate was 0.7% and the rental vacancy rate was 7.7%.

Racial composition as of the 2020 census
Race	Number	Percent
White	212	48.8%
Black or African American	5	1.2%
American Indian and Alaska Native	1	0.2%
Asian	1	0.2%
Native Hawaiian and Other Pacific Islander	0	0.0%
Some other race	122	28.1%
Two or more races	93	21.4%
Hispanic or Latino (of any race)	256	59.0%

=== 2000 census ===
According to the 2000 census, 182 households and 139 families resided in the city. The population density was 816.8 inhabitants per square mile (315.4/km^{2}). The 194 housing units averaged 297.8/sq mi (115.2/km^{2}). The racial makeup of the city was 72.56% White, 0.94% African American, 22.18% from other races, and 4.32% from two or more races. Hispanics or Latinos of any race were 55.45% of the population.

Of the 182 households, 39.6% had children under the age of 18 living with them, 62.1% were married couples living together, 9.9% had a female householder with no husband present, and 23.1% were not families; 19.8% of all households were made up of individuals, and 8.2% had someone living alone who was 65 years of age or older. The average household size was 2.92 and the average family size was 3.41.

In the city, the population was distributed as 32.1% under the age of 18, 10.3% from 18 to 24, 23.1% from 25 to 44, 23.5% from 45 to 64, and 10.9% who were 65 years of age or older. The median age was 32 years. For every 100 females, there were 103.8 males. For every 100 females age 18 and over, there were 102.8 males.

The median income for a household in the city was $28,333, and for a family was $32,000. Males had a median income of $26,944 versus $18,438 for females. The per capita income for the city was $12,654. About 15.0% of families and 26.1% of the population were below the poverty line, including 36.6% of those under age 18 and 23.4% of those age 65 or over.

== Notable people ==
- Jerry "Bo" Coleman, was born in Wilson and became a radio disc jockey in Lubbock and a friend and associate of Buddy Holly and Waylon Jennings

== See also ==
- Woodrow, Texas
- Slide, Texas
- Llano Estacado
- Close City, Texas
- Canyon Valley, Texas
