= Lubbock-Cooper Independent School District =

School district in Texas

- 13807 Indiana Ave. Lubbock, Texas, 79423

District information
- Grades: Pre-K through 12
- Superintendent: Keith Bryant
- NCES District ID: 4815180

Students and staff
- Students: 6,571
- Teachers: 501.07 (FTE)

Other information
- Website: www.lcisd.net

Lubbock-Cooper Independent School District (LCISD) is a 5-A school district located south of the city of Lubbock, Texas, United States, centered on the small community of Woodrow. School colors are red and black, and the mascot is the Fighting Pirates. According to the Fast Growth School Coalition, Lubbock-Cooper ISD is the second fastest-growing school district in Texas.

Lubbock-Cooper is located in southern Lubbock County. A portion of the city of Lubbock lies within its boundaries. It is bordered by Lubbock ISD to the north, Frenship ISD to the west, Slaton ISD to the east, and New Home ISD to the south. Lubbock-Cooper is considered one of the premier school districts in the Lubbock area. Approximately 6,000 students are enrolled at Lubbock-Cooper ISD

In 2009, the school district was rated "recognized" by the Texas Education Agency.

== Academics ==
Lubbock-Cooper has maintained a "recognized" or "exemplary" STAAR state rating for the past several years. Each campus features recognized UIL (University Interscholastic League) teams, leadership organizations and accelerated classes. Lubbock-Cooper High School was recognized as a National Blue Ribbon School in 2007, one of only three high schools in Texas so recognized during that year.

== Schools ==
High schools

- Lubbock-Cooper High School
- Liberty High School

Middle schools

- Laura Welch Bush Middle School
- Lubbock-Cooper Middle School

Elementary schools

- Central Elementary School
- East Elementary School
- North Elementary School
- South Elementary School
- West Elementary School

Other

- New Hope Academy

== Athletics ==
Lubbock-Cooper is a current member of UIL. As of 2020, they are a member of District 4-5A, which includes Lubbock-Cooper, Lubbock High, Lubbock Coronado, Lubbock Monterey, Abilene Cooper, and Abilene Wylie. Lubbock-Cooper's football team as of is currently a member of District 3-5ADII, which includes Lubbock-Cooper, Wichita Falls High, Wichita Falls Rider, Plainview, Canyon Randall, and Abilene Wylie.

== Leadership ==
LCISD is under the leadership of a board of trustees including seven community members and Superintendent Keith Bryant.

== Controversy ==
In April 2022, allegations were made of persistent racial harassment of Black students at Laura Bush Middle School. In December 2022, a formal complaint was filed against the district with the Office of Civil Rights in the Federal Department of Education, alleging that the district had not made a sufficient response to the concerns raised earlier in the year.
