= Woodrow, Texas =

- Unincorporated community
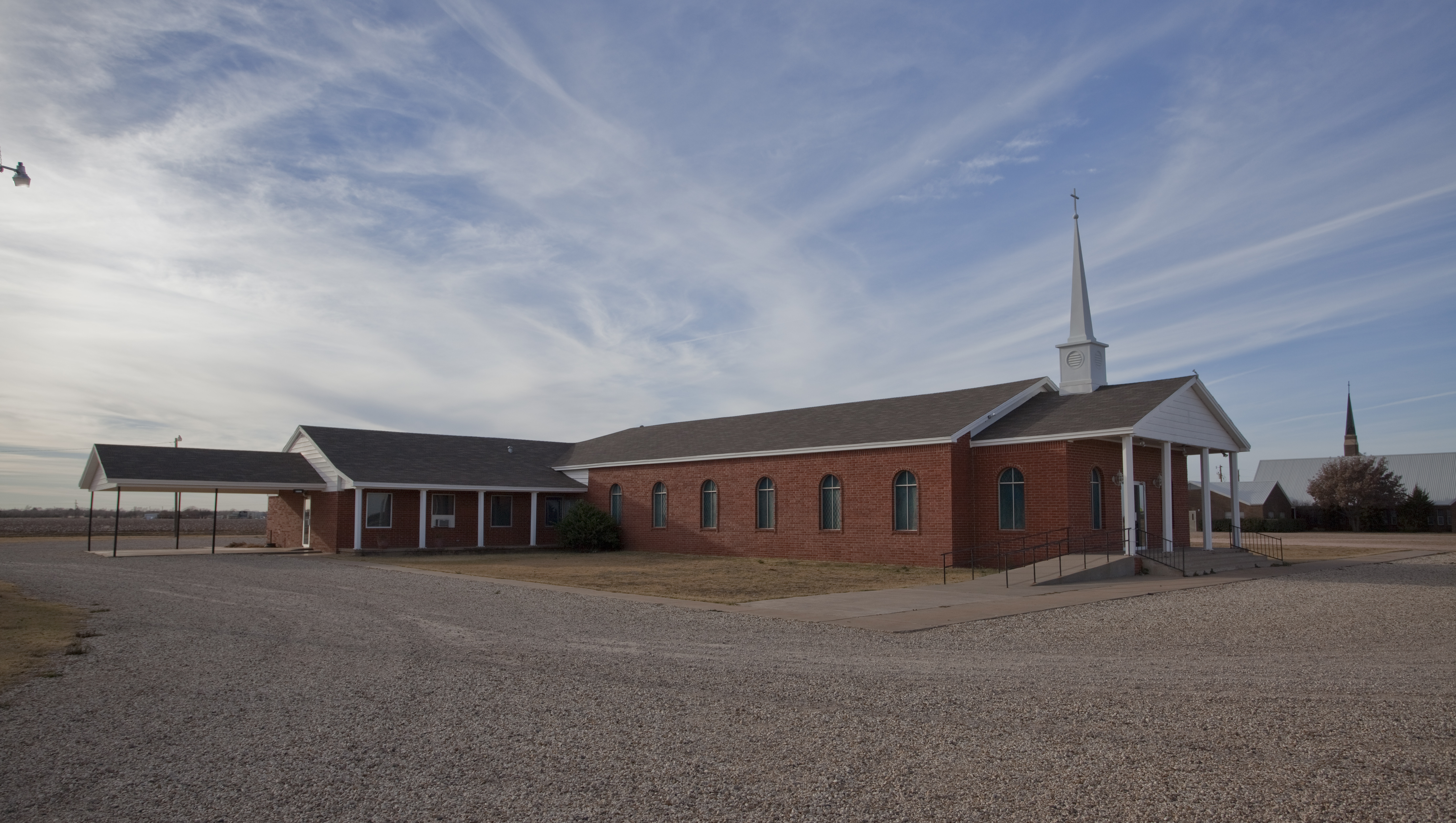
- One of four churches in Woodrow

- Location within Texas Location within the United States
- Coordinates: 33°26′48″N 101°50′39″W
- Country: United States
- State: Texas
- County: Lubbock
- Physiographic region: Llano Estacado
- Founded: 1910s
- Elevation: 3,182 ft (970 m)
- Time zone: UTC-6 (Central (CST))
  - Summer (DST): UTC-5 (CDT)
- Area code: 806
- Website: Handbook of Texas

Woodrow is an unincorporated community in southern Lubbock County, Texas, United States. According to the Handbook of Texas, the community had a population of 85 in 2000. It is part of the Lubbock Metropolitan Statistical Area.

== History ==
The community was named for president Woodrow Wilson. There was a lot of debate at first over naming the town Wilson or Woodrow, but supporters of Woodrow prevailed. In the 1930s, the hamlet had a church, an industry, and a dispersed housing stock. Woodrow had 100 residents and four enterprises in 1948. There were no recorded companies in 1971, and the population was 80. Woodrow operated four churches, a gin, a general store, and a shop that repaired farm equipment in the late 1980s. A huge cemetery and a tiny business sector separated about twenty-five homes. The population was 85 in 1990. In 2000, the population did not change. It might have been named Woodrow because there is already a Wilson in neighboring Lynn County.

The 1970 Lubbock tornado caused a thunderstorm to form near Woodrow. Another F0 tornado struck Woodrow on April 30, 2013. The brief landspout tornado formed along an outflow boundary from a nearby microburst and remained over open fields, causing no damage.

== Geography ==
Woodrow is located on U.S. Route 87, 10 mi (16 km) south of Lubbock in southern Lubbock County. State Highway Loop 493 also travels through the community.

== Education ==
In 1917, the first school was constructed. As plans to upgrade Lubbock County's rural school system were being developed, Woodrow was assigned to District One to combine with a newly proposed school. Eventually, a consensus was reached on consolidation, and District One trustees were chosen. The $84,000 Cooper School became a hybrid elementary and high school when work on it started in 1936. Today, Woodrow is served by the Lubbock-Cooper Independent School District. Lubbock-Cooper South Elementary School is in the community.

== Media ==
WPCS (FM), a Christian radio station, operates the call sign "K218DI" in Woodrow. In October 2003, 91.5 FM of the Rejoice Broadcast Network began broadcasting in Woodrow.
