= Texline, Texas =

- Town
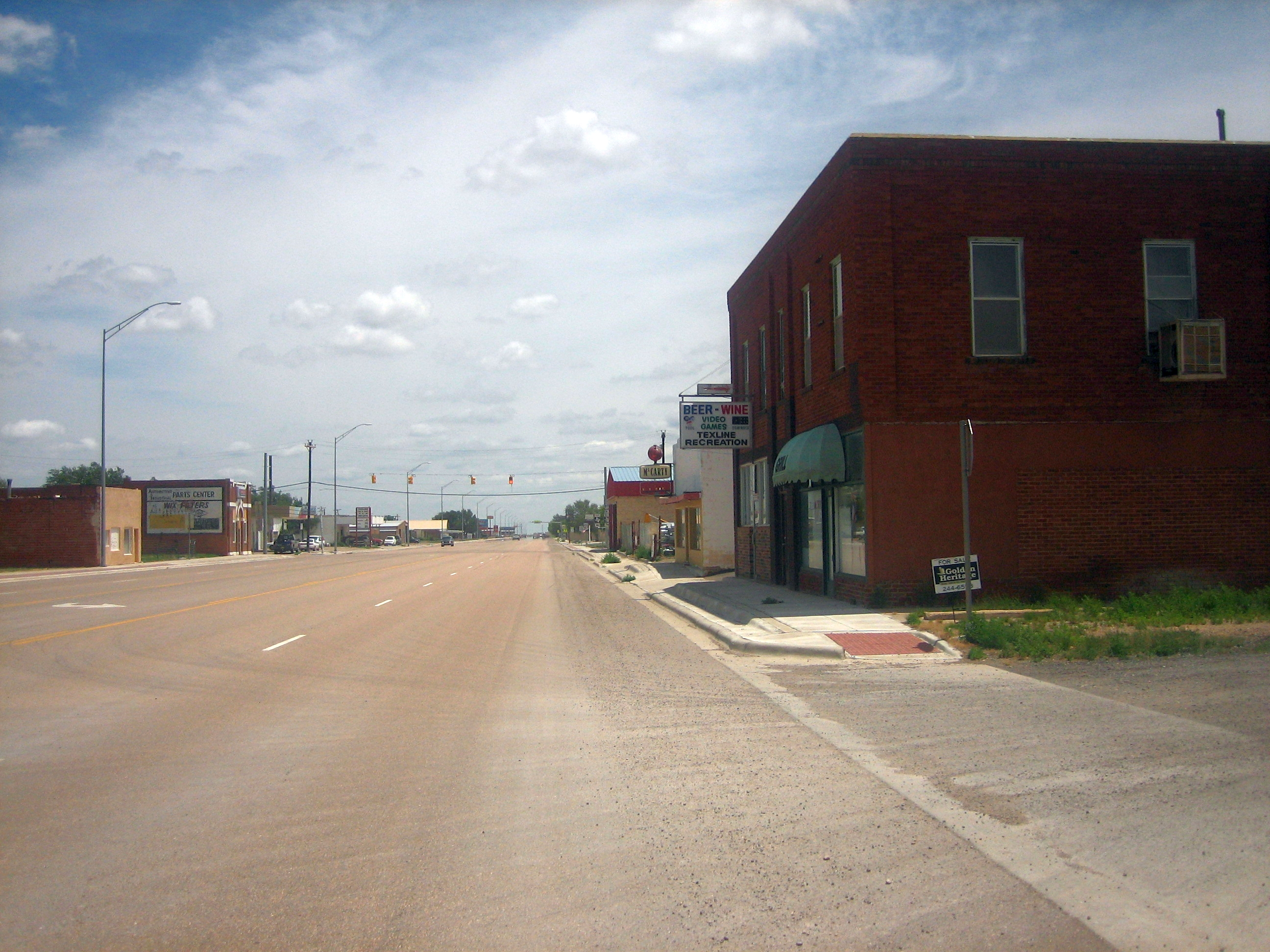
- Downtown Texline on U.S. Highway 87

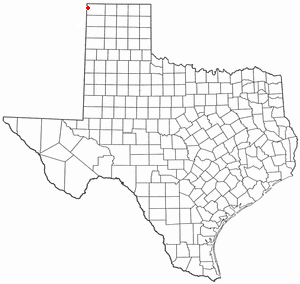
- Location of Texline, Texas

- Coordinates: 36°22′35″N 103°01′08″W
- Country: United States
- State: Texas
- County: Dallam

Area
  - Total: 1.02 sq mi (2.63 km^{2})
  - Land: 1.02 sq mi (2.63 km^{2})
  - Water: 0 sq mi (0.00 km^{2})
- Elevation: 4,682 ft (1,427 m)

Population (2020)
  - Total: 448
  - Density: 441/sq mi (170/km^{2})
- Time zone: UTC-6 (Central (CST))
  - Summer (DST): UTC-5 (CDT)
- ZIP code: 79087
- Area code: 806
- FIPS code: 48-72476
- GNIS feature ID: 2413379

Texline is a town in northwestern Dallam County, Texas, United States. Its population was 448 at the 2020 census. The town is named for its location near the New Mexico-Texas state line. The town sits on U.S. Highway 87, which continues southeast towards Dalhart and northwest towards Clayton, New Mexico.

== History of boundary dispute ==
The straight north–south border between the two states was originally defined as the 103rd meridian, but the 1859 survey to mark that boundary mistakenly set the border between 2.29 and 3.77 miles (3.69–6.07 km) west of that line. This survey error resulted in the current towns of Texline, Farwell, Bledsoe, Bronco, and a part of Glenrio being within the State of Texas. New Mexico's short border with Oklahoma, in contrast, was correctly surveyed on the meridian. New Mexico's draft constitution in 1910 stated that the border is on the 103rd meridian as intended. The disputed strip, hundreds of miles long, includes parts of valuable oilfields of the Permian Basin. A bill was passed in the New Mexico Senate to fund and file a lawsuit in the U.S. Supreme Court to recover the strip from Texas, but the bill did not become law. Today, land in the strip is included in Texas land surveys and the land and towns for all purposes are taxed and governed by the State of Texas.

== Geography ==
Texline is located just over a mile from the New Mexico border along U.S. Highway 87 and six miles south of the Texas-Oklahoma border. Dalhart is around 35 miles to the southeast and Clayton, New Mexico, is about 11 miles to the northwest.

According to the United States Census Bureau, the town has a total area of 1.0 square mile (2.6 km^{2}), all land.

== Demographics ==
Historical population
| Census | Pop. | Note | %± |
|---|---|---|---|
| 1920 | 762 | | — |
| 1930 | 711 | | −6.7% |
| 1940 | 385 | | −45.9% |
| 1950 | 437 | | 13.5% |
| 1960 | 430 | | −1.6% |
| 1970 | 387 | | −10.0% |
| 1980 | 477 | | 23.3% |
| 1990 | 425 | | −10.9% |
| 2000 | 511 | | 20.2% |
| 2010 | 507 | | −0.8% |
| 2020 | 448 | | −11.6% |
U.S. Decennial Census

=== 2020 census ===
Texline racial composition (NH = Non-Hispanic) (Note: Note: the US Census treats Hispanic/Latino as an ethnic category. This table excludes Latinos from the racial categories and assigns them to a separate category. Hispanics/Latinos can be of any race.)
| Race | Number | Percentage |
|---|---|---|
| White (NH) | 222 | 49.55% |
| Native American or Alaska Native (NH) | 1 | 0.22% |
| Mixed/multiracial (NH) | 13 | 2.9% |
| Hispanic or Latino | 212 | 47.32% |
| Total | 448 | |

As of the 2020 United States census, 448 people, 160 households, and 74 families were residing in the town.

=== 2000 census ===
As of the census of 2000, 511 people, 196 households, and 134 families resided in the town. The population density was 504.2 inhabitants per square mile (194.7/km^{2}). The 227 housing units had an average density of 224.0 per square mile (86.5/km^{2}). The racial makeup of the town was 90.02% White, 0.20% Native American, 6.85% from other races, and 2.94% from two or more races. Hispanics or Latinos of any race were 26.81% of the population.

Of the 196 households, 38.3% had children under 18 living with them, 59.7% were married couples living together, 4.6% had a female householder with no husband present, and 31.6% were not families. About 30.6% of all households were made up of individuals, and 11.2% had someone living alone who was 65 or older. The average household size was 2.61 and the average family size was 3.31.

In the town, the age distribution was 31.9% under 18, 6.8% from 18 to 24, 26.8% from 25 to 44, 24.3% from 45 to 64, and 10.2% who were 65 or older. The median age was 33 years. For every 100 females, there were 94.3 males. For every 100 females 18 and over, there were 96.6 males.

The median income for a household in the town was $32,188, and for a family was $37,708. Males had a median income of $29,792 versus $14,792 for females. The per capita income for the town was $15,086. About 13.9% of families and 10.8% of the population were below the poverty line, including 11.4% of those under age 18 and 12.8% of those age 65 or over.

== Education ==
The Texline Independent School District serves Texline. The district's only school (kindergarten- grade 12) is called Texline Public School.

Dallam County is in the service area of Frank Phillips College (known in legislation as Borger Junior College).

== Notable person ==
- W. A. Criswell, veteran pastor of the First Baptist Church of Dallas, Texas, was born in Oklahoma, but raised in Texline.
