= Texas's 86th House of Representatives district =

Electoral district of Texas

Texas's 86th State House of Representatives district
Representative
John T. Smithee; R–Amarillo

District 86 is a district in the Texas House of Representatives. It has been represented by Republican John T. Smithee since 1985.

== Geography ==
The district contains the counties of Armstrong, Dallam, Deaf Smith, Hartley, Oldham, Parmer and Randall.

== Members ==
- Bob Simpson (until 1985)
- John T. Smithee (since 1985)
