= Sayers, Texas =

- Unincorporated community
- Location within Texas Location within the United States
- Coordinates: 29°22′27″N 98°17′20″W
- Country: United States
- State: Texas
- County: Bexar
- Elevation: 528 ft (161 m)
- Time zone: UTC-6 (Central (CST))
  - Summer (DST): UTC-5 (CDT)
- ZIP code: 78101
- Area code: 210
- GNIS feature ID: 1376028

Sayers is a small unincorporated community in Bexar County, Texas, United States. It is part of the San Antonio Metropolitan Statistical Area.

== History ==
Sayers was established after the Civil War. A post office was established in Sayers in 1885. Fifty people were living in Sayers in 1896, while there were two general stores and a church. The Adkins post office was moved to Sayers, and the postal area was named Adkins. It lost half of its population in 1940 and had three businesses, which all closed after World War II. The community now has several churches, restaurants, a small grocery store, a gas station, and a cemetery.

== Geography ==
Sayers is located at the intersection of U.S. Route 87 and FM 1628, 13 mi (21 km) southeast of Downtown San Antonio in eastern Bexar County.

== Education ==
Sayers had its own school in 1896. Today, the community is served by the East Central Independent School District. Salem-Sayers Baptist School also serves the community.

== In popular culture ==
The film Sugarland Express, which is based on the true story of Sayers residents, was filmed in and around Sayers.
