= Sparenberg, Texas =

- Unincorporated community
- Location within Texas Location within the United States
- Coordinates: 32°35′2″N 101°50′24″W
- Country: United States
- State: Texas
- County: Dawson
- Elevation: 2,861 ft (872 m)
- Time zone: UTC-6 (Central (CST))
  - Summer (DST): UTC-5 (CDT)
- Area code: 806
- GNIS feature ID: 1379098

Sparenberg is an unincorporated community in Dawson County, Texas, United States. According to the Handbook of Texas, the community had an estimated population of 20 in 2000.

== Geography ==
Sparenberg is located at the intersection of Farm to Market Road 828 and Farm to Market Road 26, 14 mi (23 km) southeast of Lamesa in southeastern Dawson County.

== Education ==
Sparenberg had its own school in 1948. Today, Sparenberg is served by the Klondike Independent School District.
