= Thomaston, Texas =

- Unincorporated community
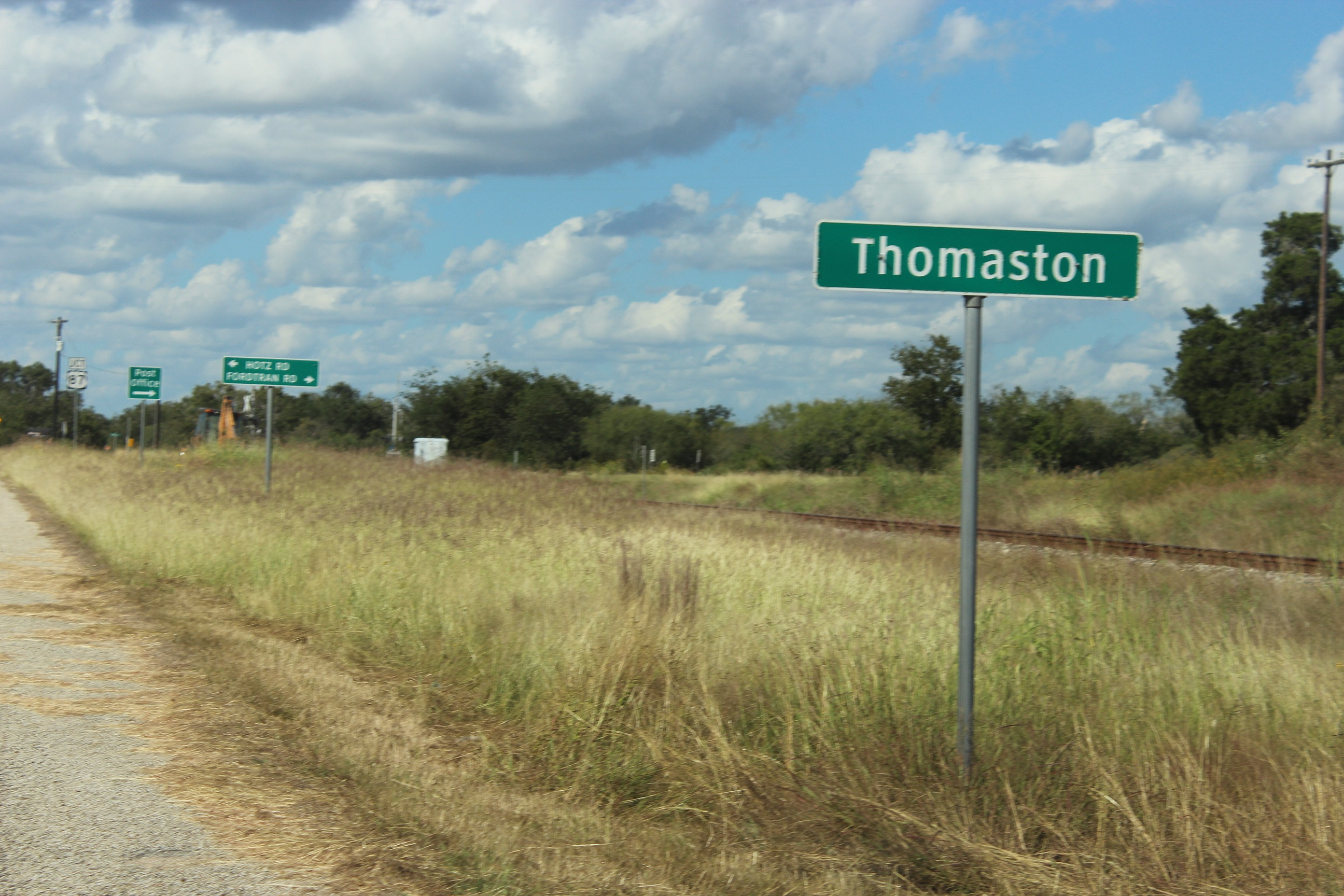

- Location within the state of Texas Thomaston (the United States)
- Coordinates: 28°59′51″N 97°9′18″W
- Country: United States
- State: Texas
- County: DeWitt
- Elevation: 161 ft (49 m)
- Time zone: UTC-6 (Central (CST))
  - Summer (DST): UTC-5 (CDT)
- ZIP codes: 77989
- GNIS feature ID: 1377648

Thomaston is an unincorporated community in southeastern DeWitt County, Texas, United States. It lies along U.S. Route 87, southeast of the city of Cuero, the county seat of DeWitt County. Its elevation is 161 feet (49 m). Although Thomaston is unincorporated, it has a post office, with the ZIP code of 77989.

== History ==
Founded along the Gulf, Western Texas and Pacific Railroad in 1872, the community was named for Nathan Thomas, who had previously owned part of the land on which the community was built. The community's post office was opened in 1873; schools were started early in the community's history, although local students now attend the Cuero schools. Thomaston has declined in recent decades as non-railroad transportation has become significant.
