= Texline Independent School District =

School district in Texas, United States

Texline School

Location
- 302 East Pine Street; Texline, Texas 79087; United States; 36.375722°N 103.018587°W

Information
- School type: Public K-12 school
- School district: Texline Independent School District
- Principal: Terrell Jones
- Grades: K-12
- Enrollment: 157 (2014-2015)
- Colors: Maroon and White
- Athletics conference: UIL Class A
- Mascot: Tornadoes/Lady Tors
- Website: Texline High School

Texline Independent School District (TISD) is a school district located in Texline, Texas (USA).

TISD is made up of one school called the Texline School. The school serves the town of Texline and unincorporated portions of Dallam County, an area of approximately 600 square miles (1,600 km^{2}) of the northern and western portions of Dallam County. Its locale is described as "rural, remote" by the National Center for Education Statistics. It provides both primary and secondary education at its single campus, with 13 grades (including one Pre-K). The current (as of 2008) president of the district administration is Jody Bezner, and the superintendent is Gary Laramore Jr.

Texline ISD has earned the state's highest Financial Integrity Rating of Superior Achievement more than once. Its district operating budget was $1,482,000 in 2006.

In 2015, the school and district were rated "Met Standard" by the Texas Education Agency.

== History ==
On October 3, 1891 the County Commissioners appropriated $240 out of the general fund for the purpose of "establishing and maintaining a public school at the town of Texline". Opened in 1892, it became the first school in Dallam County. The school was later moved into the new courthouse upon its completion and held there until 1912 when a two story school building was constructed. By 1922, school enrollment was up to 248 and construction for a new school was begun. It was located where the tennis court now stands. This building was demolished in 1968. Classes began in the fall of 1966 in the present one story building and campus located at 302 E. Pine St.

== Student body ==
During the 2007–2008 school year, the Texline School had 147 students.

- 67% were White
- 31% were Hispanic
- 1% were Native American
- Less than 1% were Asian American

62% of the student body qualified for free or reduced lunch.

== Athletics ==
The Texline Tornadoes compete in the following sports:

- Basketball
- Cross Country
- Golf
- Tennis
- Track and Field

=== State Titles ===
- Boys' Basketball
  - 2015(1A), 2021(1A)
