= Knott, Texas =

- Unincorporated community
- Location within Texas Location within the United States
- Coordinates: 32°24′9″N 101°38′28″W
- Country: United States
- State: Texas
- County: Howard
- Elevation: 2,612 ft (796 m)
- Time zone: UTC-6 (Central (CST))
  - Summer (DST): UTC-5 (CDT)
- ZIP codes: 79748
- GNIS feature ID: 1339195

Knott is an unincorporated community in northwestern Howard County, Texas, United States. It lies along FM 846 northwest of the city of Big Spring, the county seat of Howard County. Its elevation is 2,612 feet (796 m). Although Knott is unincorporated, it has a post office, with the ZIP code of 79748.

Knott, along with its neighbor West Knott, was named for rancher Calvin Stevenson Knott, one of the first settlers in the area. Agriculture is important in the Knott area; although watermelons were once significant in the local economy, cotton farming is now dominant.

== Climate ==
According to the Köppen Climate Classification system, Knott has a semi-arid climate, abbreviated "BSk" on climate maps.
