= John T. Smithee =

Texas legislator

John Smithee

Member of the Texas House of Representatives from the 86th district
- Incumbent
- Assumed office January 8, 1985
- Preceded by: Bob Simpson
- Succeeded by: Holly Jeffreys (elect)

Personal details
- Born: John T. Smithee; September 7, 1951 (age 75)
- Party: Republican
- Spouse: Becky
- Children: 2
- Education: West Texas A&M University (BBA); Texas Tech University (JD)

John T. Smithee (born September 7, 1951) is an American politician and attorney serving as a member of the Texas House of Representatives from the 86th district. Elected in November 1984, he assumed office in January 1985.

== Education ==
Smithee earned a Bachelor of Business Administration from West Texas A&M University and a Juris Doctor from the Texas Tech University School of Law.

== Career ==
After graduating from law school, Smithee has worked as a businessman and attorney. He was elected to the Texas House of Representatives in November 1984 and assumed office in January 1985. During the 2017 legislative session, Smithee served as chair of the Judiciary and Civil Jurisprudence Committee.

On May 27, 2023, Smithee voted no to impeach Ken Paxton.

In 2025, Smithee announced that he will not seek re-election in 2026.

Texas House of Representatives
Preceded by Bob Simpson	Member of the Texas House of Representatives from the 86th district 1985–present	Incumbent
