= Vick, Texas =

- Unincorporated community
- Location within Texas Location within the United States
- Coordinates: 31°20′28″N 100°05′31″W
- Country: United States
- State: Texas
- County: Concho
- Elevation: 1,857 ft (566 m)
- Time zone: UTC-6 (Central (CST))
  - Summer (DST): UTC-5 (CDT)
- Area code: 325
- GNIS feature ID: 1370630

Vick is an unincorporated community in Concho County in the U.S. state of Texas. According to the Handbook of Texas, the community had a population of 20 in 2000.

== History ==
In 1963, Vick had two businesses alongside a post office and a motel. There were some scattered buildings in the area in 1984. The population was recorded as 20 in 2000.

== Geography ==
Vick is located at the intersection of Farm to Market Road 381 and U.S. Route 87, 4 mi (6.4 km) south of Eola in west-central Concho County.

== Education ==
Today, the community is served by the Eden Consolidated Independent School District.
