= Melvin, Texas =

- Town
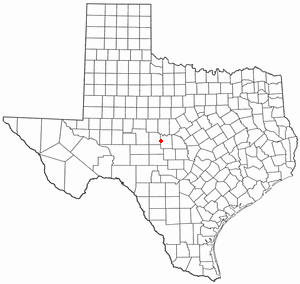
- Location of Melvin, Texas

- Coordinates: 31°11′57″N 99°34′51″W
- Country: United States
- State: Texas
- County: McCulloch

Area
  - Total: 0.47 sq mi (1.21 km^{2})
  - Land: 0.46 sq mi (1.20 km^{2})
  - Water: 0.0039 sq mi (0.01 km^{2})
- Elevation: 1,834 ft (559 m)

Population (2020)
  - Total: 123
  - Density: 265/sq mi (102/km^{2})
- Time zone: UTC-6 (Central (CST))
  - Summer (DST): UTC-5 (CDT)
- ZIP code: 76858
- Area code: 325
- FIPS code: 48-47568
- GNIS feature ID: 2412982

Melvin is a town in McCulloch County, Texas, United States. Its population was 123 at the 2020 census.

== Geography ==
According to the United States Census Bureau, the town has a total area of 0.5 square miles (1.3 km^{2}), all land.

=== Climate ===
The climate in this area is characterized by hot, humid summers and generally mild to cool winters. According to the Köppen climate classification, Melvin has a humid subtropical climate, Cfa on climate maps.

== Demographics ==
Historical population
Census	Pop.	Note	%±
1950	696		—
1960	401		−42.4%
1970	290		−27.7%
1980	202		−30.3%
1990	184		−8.9%
2000	155		−15.8%
2010	178		14.8%
2020	123		−30.9%
U.S. Decennial Census; 2020 Census

As of the census of 2000, 155 people, 68 households, and 39 families were residing in the town. The population density was 329.2 inhabitants per square mile (127.1/km^{2}). The 100 housing units averaged 212.4 per square mile (82.1/km^{2}). The racial makeup of the town was 87.10% White, 12.26% from other races, and 0.65% from two or more races. Hispanics or Latinos of any race were 27.10% of the population.

Of the 68 households, 27.9% had children under the age of 18 living with them, 48.5% were married couples living together, 8.8% had a female householder with no husband present, and 42.6% were not families. About 38.2% of all households were made up of individuals, and 23.5% had someone living alone who was 65 years of age or older. The average household size was 2.28, and the average family size was 3.00.

In the town, the age distribution was 24.5% under 18, 5.2% from 18 to 24, 24.5% from 25 to 44, 23.2% from 45 to 64, and 22.6% who were 65 or older. The median age was 43 years. For every 100 females, there were 93.8 males. For every 100 females age 18 and over, there were 80.0 males.

The median income for a household in the town was $14,107, and for a family was $17,386. Males had a median income of $20,625 versus $21,875 for females. The per capita income for the town was $11,124. About 36.7% of families and 50.0% of the population were below the poverty line, including 67.5% of those under the age of 18 and 57.9% of those 65 or over.

== Education ==
The Melvin Independent School District was closed in summer 1971 and its responsibilities were taken over by the Brady Independent School District.
