= Lohn =

Lohn may refer to:

- Leber's hereditary optic neuropathy or LOHN
- Landsitz Lohn, the country estate of the Swiss Federal Council
- Lohn, Texas
  - Lohn Independent School District, located in Lohn, Texas
- a number of municipalities in Switzerland:
  - Lohn, Graubünden
  - Lohn, Schaffhausen
  - Lohn, Solothurn, a former municipality now part of Lohn-Ammannsegg
