= Mercury, Texas =

Unincorporated community in Texas, US

Coordinates: 31°24′45″N 99°09′27″W

Mercury is an unincorporated community in McCulloch County, Texas, United States. According to the Handbook of Texas, the community had an estimated population of 166 in 2000.

The community is situated along FM 502 in northeastern McCulloch County, approximately 22 miles northeast of Brady. It is the community closest to the geometric center of Texas.

== History ==
The community was founded in 1904, shortly after the arrival of the Fort Worth and Rio Grande Railroad. Mercury became a livestock shipping point and by 1914, had an estimated population of 550. Two major fires in 1919 and 1929 severely impacted the community. In 1938, the struggling community was bypassed by the Brady-Brownwood highway. Mercury continued to decline and the population fell from 489 in 1933 to 360 in 1949. By 2000, the number of inhabitants stood at 166.

Currently there are two original buildings standing in the Town of Mercury. It is the Bank Of Mercury building that was built by Thomas Jefferson Beasley in 1903 as a bank and mercantile store. Through the years the building has exchanged hands several times. The only thing that remains of the building are the four outer walls and the vault that Thomas Jefferson Beasley built. It is rumored that the vault has a dome that is filled with sand.

The other historic building, built in 1909, remains in Mercury, Texas. The house originally served as the home of the Hudson family and has since been passed down through multiple generations. Over the decades, it has housed various members of the extended Hudson family, preserving a rich legacy of local heritage and continuity.

Public education in the community of Mercury is provided by the Rochelle Independent School District.
