= Old McCulloch County Jail =

- U.S. National Register of Historic Places
- Recorded Texas Historic Landmark
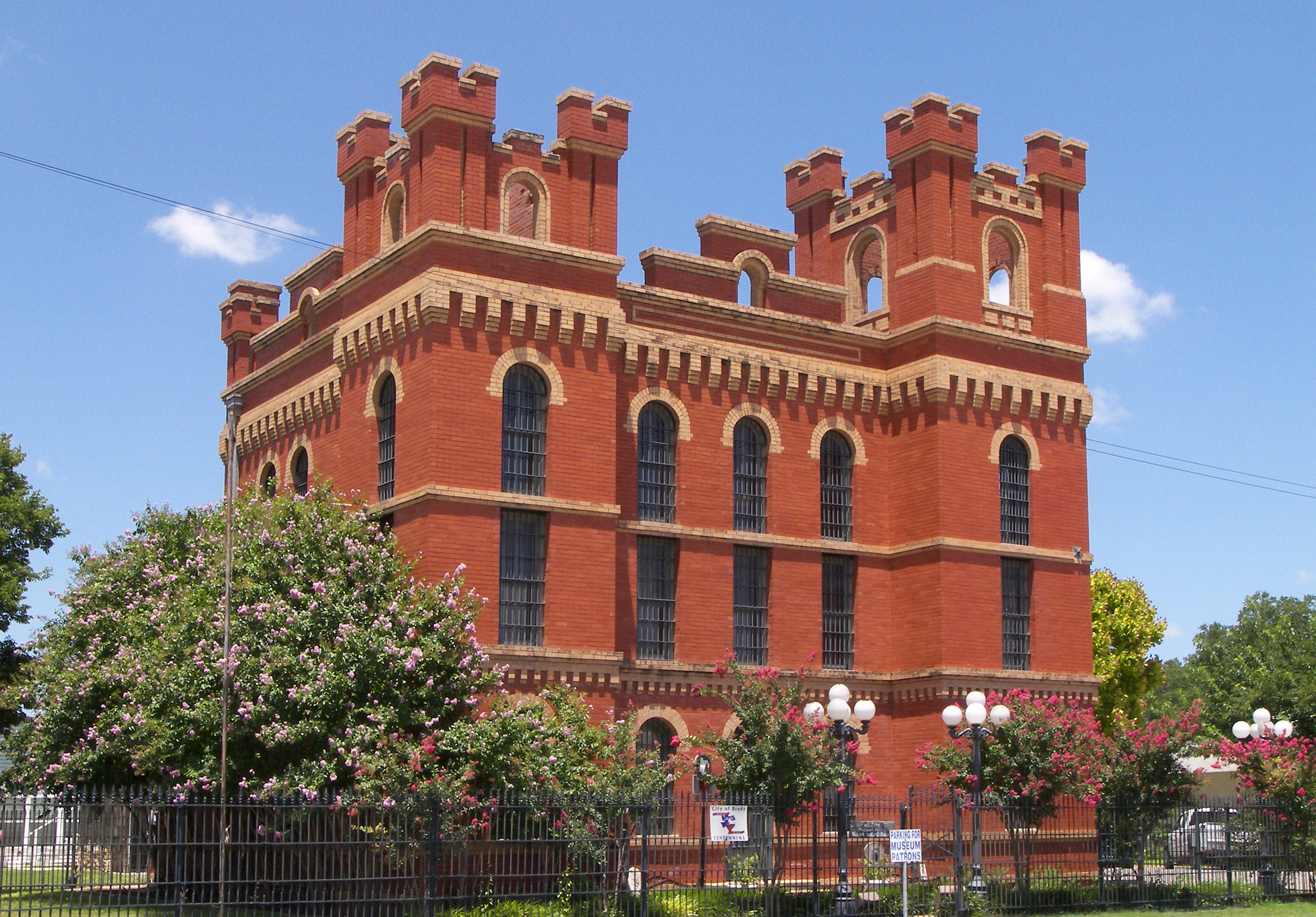
- Old McCulloch County Jail in 2010

- Location within Texas Location within the United States
- Location: 117 N. High St. Brady, Texas
- Coordinates: 31°8′7″N 99°20′12″W
- Area: less than one acre
- Built: 1909
- Architectural style: Richardsonian Romanesque
- NRHP reference No.: 75002073
- RTHL No.: 3287

Significant dates
- Added to NRHP: April 3, 1975
- Designated RTHL: 1976

The Old McCulloch County Jail is located in Brady, McCulloch County, in the U.S. state of Texas. It was added to the National Register of Historic Places listings in McCulloch County, Texas in 1975, and became a Recorded Texas Historic Landmark in 1976. In 1963, the Texas Historical Commission designated the geographical center of Texas as being located 5 miles (8.0 km) northwest of Brady. The old jail became the Heart of Texas Historical Museum in 1974. A granite monument to the center of Texas can be found on the grounds of the McCulloch County Courthouse.

== History ==
What is known as the Old McCulloch County Jail is actually the second structure to serve as the county jail. The first jail was built soon after the county's 1876 official organization, the structure having been completed in 1878. The construction on the first jail proved to be of poor quality, and McCulloch's prisoners were eventually incarcerated in Mason and San Saba. A new facility was approved by the Commissioner's Court in 1908, and completed in 1910 at a cost of $14,418.75. Construction of the three-story, red brick Richardson Romanesque facility was done by Southern Structural Steel Company of San Antonio. The second floor housed the prisoners, while the first floor served as living quarters for the sheriff and his family, or for the deputies. The third floor consists of twin towers. The underside of the third floor had a hanging ring, with a second floor trap door to facilitate death by hanging. In both 1936 and 1938, Brady Creek (San Saba River) overflowed its banks and caused the living quarters to be flooded. When the county decided to build a newer facility in 1974, this jail became known as the Old McCulloch County Jail.

== Heart of Texas Historical Museum ==
The old jail now houses the Heart of Texas Historical Museum. In 1974, McCulloch County built a new jail, and the non-profit Heart of Texas Historical Museum, Inc purchased the old jail for $5.00 Restoration of the old jail was completed by 1976 with private donations and matching funds from the State of Texas. The museum received its own Recorded Texas Historic Landmark status in 1976, separate from the RTHL designated to the old jail.

== See also ==
- National Register of Historic Places listings in McCulloch County, Texas
- Recorded Texas Historic Landmarks in McCulloch County
