= Rochelle, Texas =

Unincorporated community in Texas, US

Rochelle is an unincorporated community in McCulloch County, Texas, United States. As of the 2020 census, Rochelle had a population of 169.

== Geography ==
Rochelle is located at 31°13′24″N 99°12′24″W. It is situated along U.S. Highway 190 in east central McCulloch County, approximately ten miles northeast of Brady. The climate in this area is characterized by hot, humid summers and generally mild to cool winters. According to the Köppen Climate Classification system, Rochelle has a humid subtropical climate, abbreviated "Cfa" on climate maps.

== History ==
Initial names for the community included Crewville and Crothers, both in honor of early McCulloch County residents. When a post office was established in 1879, the name Rochelle was suggested by a local settler from La Rochelle, France, which was accepted by postal officials. A one-room schoolhouse was first built in 1886 when the community had a population of approximately 30. The Fort Worth and Rio Grande Railway Company laid its track from Brownwood to Brady in 1903. A second line, the Gulf, Colorado and Santa Fe Railroad completed its track from Eden to Lometa in 1912. The arrival of the railroads caused Rochelle to grow substantially. The number of inhabitants had risen to around 700 by 1914. In 1930, several smaller schools consolidated with Rochelle High School. These schools were Placid, Claxton, Corn Creek, and Round Mountain. Several more schools, including Cowboy, Fairview, East Sweden, and Mercury had transferred their students to Rochelle by the end of 1937. Rochelle's population during the 1930s was just over 500 and remained at that level until the 1950s. The Gulf, Colorado and Santa Fe Railway abandoned its track through the community in 1959, accelerating the rate of decline. By the early 1960s, only 100 people remained in Rochelle. That figure rose slightly to 163 in the 1960s and remained at that level through 2000.

Although Rochelle is unincorporated, it has a post office, with the ZIP code of 76872.

== Education ==
Public education in the community of Rochelle is provided by the Rochelle Independent School District and home to the Rochelle High School Hornets. The district covers a large portion of northeastern McCulloch County.

== Demographics ==
Historical population
Census	Pop.	Note	%±
2020	169		—
U.S. Decennial Census; 1850–1900 1910; 1920 1930 1940; 1950 1960 1970; 1980 1990 2000; 2010 2020

Rochelle first appeared as a census-designated place in the 2020 U.S. census.

=== 2020 census ===
Rochelle CDP, Texas – Racial and ethnic composition Note: the US Census treats Hispanic/Latino as an ethnic category. This table excludes Latinos from the racial categories and assigns them to a separate category. Hispanics/Latinos may be of any race.
Race / Ethnicity (NH = Non-Hispanic)	Pop 2020	% 2020
White alone (NH)	131	77.51%
Black or African American alone (NH)	0	0.00%
Native American or Alaska Native alone (NH)	0	0.00%
Asian alone (NH)	0	0.00%
Native Hawaiian or Pacific Islander alone (NH)	0	0.00%
Other race alone (NH)	0	0.00%
Mixed race or Multiracial (NH)	11	6.51%
Hispanic or Latino (any race)	27	15.98%
Total	169	100.00%

== Notable person ==
- Bonnie Richardson - won the Class 1A high school team track and field state championship in 2008 and 2009.
