= Lohn High School =

Location
- 1112 FM 504; Lohn, Texas 76852-0277; United States; 31.323623°N 99.409376°W

Information
- School type: Public High School
- School district: Lohn Independent School District
- Principal: Steve Coston
- Teaching staff: 13.51 (FTE)
- Grades: PK-12
- Enrollment: 109 (2023-2024)
- Student to teacher ratio: 8.07
- Colors: Maroon & White
- Athletics conference: UIL Class A
- Mascot: Eagle
- Website: Lohn High School

Lohn High School or Lohn School is a public high school located in unincorporated Lohn, Texas (USA) and classified as a 1A school by the UIL. It is part of the Lohn Independent School District located in north central McCulloch County. In 2015, the school was rated "Improvement Required" by the Texas Education Agency.

== History ==
Lohn Valley was settled in 1879 by W.F. Lohn and family. In 1896 Lohn Central School was built at Lohn ISD's present location as a consolidation of three small schools near the town of Lohn. The school had one teacher: Mr. S.H. Gholson. As Lohn grew in the early 1900s, a need for a larger school emerged. Consequently, in 1915, a new two-story, brick school house was built. By 1934 Lohn students had once again outgrown their school, and the building was replaced with another new building. The 1934 building housed the majority of classes until it was replaced with the present new main building in 2004. A new ag science classroom and shop was completed in 2009. In the fall of 2012 Eagle Field, through donations, was completely renovated including, new natural-grass turf, chain link fence, announcer's booth, concession stand, new field lighting and sound system.

== Athletics ==
The Lohn Eagles compete in these sports

- Basketball
- Cross Country
- 6-Man Football
- Golf
- Tennis
- Track and Field

=== State Titles ===
- Football
  - 1987(6M)
