= Scott Appleton =

American football player (1942–1992)

No. 70
- Positions: Defensive tackle, Defensive end

Personal information
- Born: February 20, 1942; Brady, Texas, U.S.
- Died: March 2, 1992 (aged 50); Austin, Texas, U.S.
- Listed height: 6 ft 3 in (1.91 m)
- Listed weight: 260 lb (118 kg)

Career information
- High school: Brady (TX)
- College: Texas
- NFL draft: 1964: 1st round, 4th overall pick
- AFL draft: 1964: 1st round, 6th overall pick

Career history
- Houston Oilers (1964–1966); San Diego Chargers (1967–1968); Oakland Raiders (1969); New Orleans Saints (1970)*; Portland Storm (1974)
- * Offseason or practice squad member only

Awards and highlights
- National champion (1963); Outland Trophy (1963); UPI Lineman of the Year (1963); Unanimous All-American (1963); Third-team All-American (1962); First-team All-SWC (1963); Second-team All-SWC (1962)

Career AFL statistics
- Fumble recoveries: 3
- Interceptions: 2
- Sacks: 16
- Stats at Pro Football Reference

Gordon Scott Appleton (February 20, 1942 – March 2, 1992) was an American professional football defensive tackle in the American Football League (AFL) for the Houston Oilers, San Diego Chargers and Oakland Raiders. He played college football at the University of Texas, which won the national championship in 1963. Appleton was a consensus 1963 All-American and won the Outland Trophy.

== Early life ==
Appleton was born on February 20, 1942, in McCulloch County, Texas to Gordon Frederick Appleton and Alberda Methelda Leifeste. He attended Brady High School, where he was an All-state tackle.

He accepted a football scholarship from the University of Texas, where he became a three-year starter and a tri-captain. He earned All-SWC honors in 1962 and 1963. As a senior, he helped Texas win its first national championship. He was named All-American, was the school's first Outland Trophy winner and he finished fifth in the Heisman Trophy balloting. He was also a member of the Texas Cowboys.

In the 1964 Cotton Bowl, he tallied 12 tackles, 2 unofficial sacks of quarterback Roger Staubach and stopped a scoring threat on fourth down with less than 10 minutes left on the game. He also contributed to the defense setting 2 records by holding Navy without a rushing first down and limiting them to minus 14 yards rushing. The 28–6 win cemented the school's first national championship.

In 1986, he was inducted into the University of Texas Athletics Hall of Honor. In 2001, he was inducted into the Southwestern Cotton Bowl Hall of Fame.

== Professional career ==
In the 1964 NFL draft, the Dallas Cowboys were looking to shore up its offense by improving at wide receiver. Head coach Tom Landry reached an agreement with the Pittsburgh Steelers to acquire Buddy Dial, who was one of the top receivers at the time in the league, in exchange for selecting Appleton with the team's first round draft choice at fourth overall and trading him immediately afterwards on January 1.

Although the Steelers thought that Appleton would sign with them, he ended up joining the Houston Oilers of the AFL, who had drafted him six overall in the first round. The voice of the Steelers, Myron Cope, described the shenanigans both teams used in the attempt to sign Appleton as the "Buddy Dial for Nothing" trade and was one of his favorite stories.

As a rookie in 1964, he was played at left defensive end, but could not earn a starting position, although he managed to record 2 interceptions. In 1965, he was moved to right defensive tackle.

Appleton's career with the Oilers was a disappointment, playing until 1966. Like his father, who battled alcoholism (and eventually committed suicide), Scott Appleton also battled alcoholism and drug addictions. On January 12, 1967, he was traded along with linebacker Johnny Baker to the San Diego Chargers in exchange for cornerback Miller Farr.

He was the Chargers' starter at right defensive tackle for 2 seasons and led the team in solo tackles in 1968. He was released on September 3, 1969.

On November 6, 1969, he was signed as a free agent by the Oakland Raiders to replace an injured Dan Birdwell, but would be later cut. On July 12, 1970, he signed with the New Orleans Saints and was released on August 10. He never missed a game during his NFL career (70 games played).

On June 12, 1974, he signed with the Portland Storm of the WFL.

== Personal life ==
After his career in football ended, he became a manager of a Dairy Queen in Westfield, Texas (20 miles north of Houston) and worked at fast food restaurants, still battling alcoholism and participating in various rehab programs. He eventually ended up at the Fourth Street Inn, a project of the First Baptist Church and Rev. Jimmy Allen, in San Antonio, Texas, where they would feed the homeless and conduct Bible readings. Appleton quit drinking and began studying to become an ordained minister. After working at the Fourth Street Inn, he started his own ministry and spoke across the U.S. talking about his alcoholism and recovery.

Suffering from heart disease, Appleton at first declined a heart transplant operation, but later was placed on the list for a donor heart. However, he died of heart failure in 1992 at age 50.

== See also ==
- List of Texas Longhorns football All-Americans
- List of Dallas Cowboys first-round draft picks
- List of American Football League players
