= National Register of Historic Places listings in McCulloch County, Texas =

Location of McCulloch County in Texas

This is a list of the National Register of Historic Places listings in McCulloch County, Texas.

This is intended to be a complete list of properties listed on the National Register of Historic Places in McCulloch County, Texas. There are two properties listed on the National Register in the county. One is a State Antiquities Landmark while both are Recorded Texas Historic Landmarks.

This National Park Service list is complete through NPS recent listings posted March 21, 2025.

== Current listings ==
The locations of National Register properties may be seen in a mapping service provided.

| | Name on the Register | Image | Date listed | Location | City or town | Description |
|---|---|---|---|---|---|---|
| 1 | McCulloch County Courthouse | McCulloch County Courthouse | December 16, 1977 (#77001515) | Public Sq. 31°08′06″N 99°20′05″W | Brady | State Antiquities Landmark, Recorded Texas Historic Landmark |
| 2 | Old McCulloch County Jail | Old McCulloch County Jail | April 3, 1975 (#75002073) | 117 N. High St. 31°08′07″N 99°20′12″W | Brady | Recorded Texas Historic Landmark |

== See also ==
- National Register of Historic Places listings in Texas
- Recorded Texas Historic Landmarks in McCulloch County
