= Rochelle High School (Texas) =

Location
- 5902 Lafayette Avenue; Rochelle, Texas 76872-0167; United States; 31.223109°N 99.204862°W

Information
- School type: Public High School
- School district: Rochelle Independent School District
- Principal: Matt Fields
- Staff: 18.44 (FTE)
- Grades: PK-12
- Enrollment: 161 (2023-2024)
- Student to teacher ratio: 8.73
- Colors: Royal Blue & Gold
- Athletics conference: UIL Class A
- Mascot: Hornet
- Website: Rochelle High School

Rochelle High School or Rochelle School is a public high school located in unincorporated Rochelle, Texas (USA) and classified as a 1A school by the UIL. It is part of the Rochelle Independent School District located in eastern McCulloch County. In 2015, the school was rated "Met Standard" by the Texas Education Agency.

== Athletics ==
The Rochelle Hornets compete in these sports

- Basketball
- Cross country
- Six-man football
- Golf
- Tennis
- Track and field

=== State titles ===
- Girls' track -
  - 2008(1A), 2009(1A)

Rochelle is notable for winning the 2008 and 2009 Class A girls' state track titles, based on the strength of Texas A&M University signee Bonnie Richardson, who was the school's only state qualifier in 2008 and the sole member of the girls' track team in 2009.
