= G. Rollie White Downs =

Coordinates: 31°7′30″N 99°21′27″W

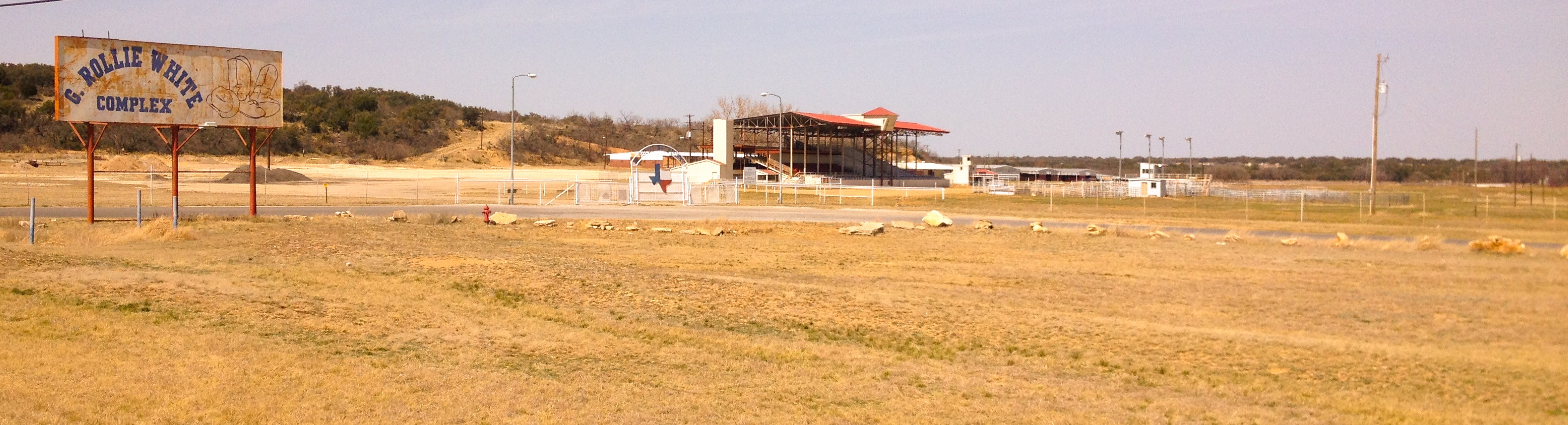
G. Rollie White Downs

G. Rollie White Downs was an American horse-racing track located in Brady, McCulloch County, Texas. It is best known as the first track to run a Pari-mutuel race in Texas after Pari-mutuel racing was legalized in 1989.

== History ==
The first races were held in 1926 during the annual Jubilee celebration. The 3/8 mile oval race track served the Jubilee until it was destroyed by a tornado in June 1945. About three years later, the track moved a half mile southwest of Richards Park to land donated to the city by Brady philanthropist, G. Rollie White.

The original track got part of its initial grandstands from the Arlington Downs, a historic landmark that was Texas' first parimutuel race track. That portion of the grandstands was razed in 1958 when the stands were enlarged. American Quarterhorse racing was a popular event in the 1970s and '80s, but declined in popularity over the years and the track closed.

== Parimutuel wagering ==
The track reopened in 1989 when local investors formed an association after the Texas Legislature approved betting on horse races. The remodeled facilities became known as G. Rollie White Downs. After acquiring a parimutuel betting track license, the first "legal" horse racing began in Texas. The first event drew more than 10,000 fans with TV stations from around the state filling the parking lot. Attendance quickly dropped with the closest large city being San Angelo 75 miles away. The track closed in December 1989, less than three months after reopening.
