= Brady Creek Reservoir =

Reservoir in McCulloch County, Texas, US

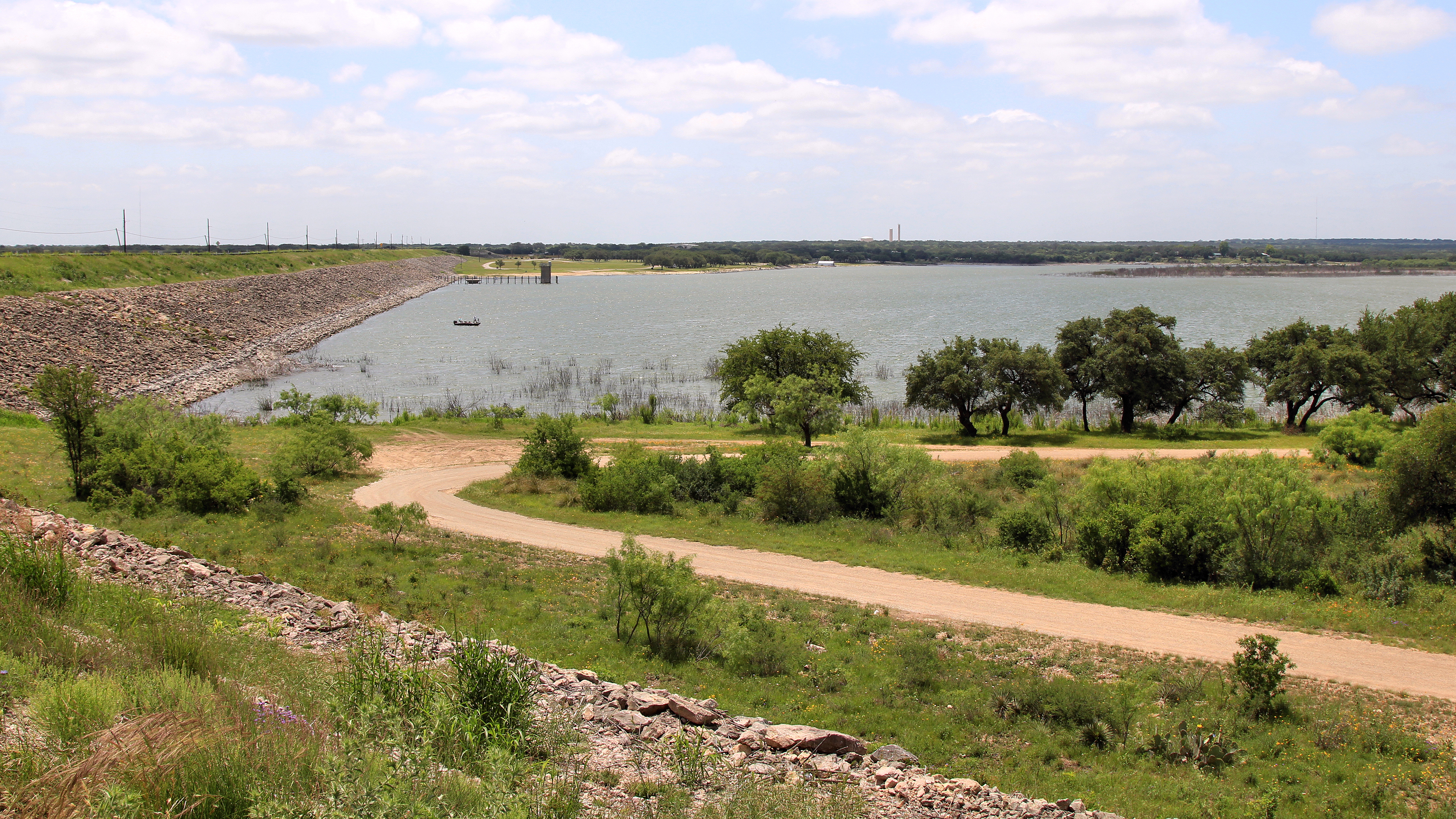

- Location within Texas Location within the United States
- Location: McCulloch County, Texas
- Coordinates: 31°8.38′N 99°25.09′W
- Type: reservoir
- Primary inflows: Brady Creek
- Primary outflows: Brady Creek
- Basin countries: United States
- Surface area: 2,020 acres (820 ha)
- Max. depth: 48 ft (15 m)
- Shore length^{1}: 25 miles (40 km)
- Surface elevation: 1,743 ft (531 m)
- ^{1} Shore length is not a well-defined measure.

Brady Creek Reservoir is a reservoir on Brady Creek in McCulloch County, Texas in the United States. The lake is about 3 miles west of downtown Brady, Texas. The dam and lake are managed by the City of Brady. The reservoir was officially impounded in 1963. The reservoir is also sometimes called Brady Reservoir or Brady Lake. The dam for Brady Creek Reservoir is 8,400 ft. long and 104 ft. high and has a storage capacity of 30,430 acre-Ft.

== Fauna ==
Brady Creek Reservoir has been stocked with species of fish intended to improve the utility of the reservoir for recreational fishing. Fish present in Brady Creek Reservoir include largemouth bass, channel catfish, crappie, and white bass. The local fish populations have gradually been recovering after a golden algae bloom that occurred in February 2012 and the drought conditions last several years.

== Flora ==
On February 13, 2012 the Brady Texas reservoir was impacted by an algae bloom that resulted in fish kills. The algae was identified to be Prymnesium parvum, a golden algae that produces toxins fatal to animals with gills. The Brady Creek Reservoir has limited aquatic vegetation in most areas but there are some submerged plant species and standing timber.

== Recreational uses ==
Boating and fishing on Brady Creek Reservoir are very popular.
