= Bonnie Richardson =

American track and field athlete

Bonnie Richardson (born September 9, 1990) is an American track and field athlete from the small community of Rochelle, Texas, who was enrolled at Texas A&M University as a nutrition major and competed on its women's track team in Combined Events.

Richardson gained fame during her high school career at Rochelle High School (total enrollment 59) when, as both a junior (2008) and senior (2009), she (as the only state qualifier from her school) single-handedly won the UIL Class A girls team track championship, notwithstanding that as the only qualifier she could not compete in relay events, which under UIL scoring rules count double the points of individual events.

== High school career ==
Under the University Interscholastic League track and field scoring system, points are awarded to the top six finishers using a 10-8-6-4-2-1 scale (10 for first place, and so on) for individual events. Relay events are scored by doubling the points for each place. An individual can compete in a maximum of five events (individual or relay).

Richardson could not practice the long jump at Rochelle High School as it does not have usable facilities. To train, she used the school's track, which "is made of dirt, grass, weeds, rocks, red-ant mounds and ruts...a trench from an old water line [to] hurdle, goats and a llama grazing beside it, armadillos and deer pattering across it", and nearby Brady High School's all-weather running track.

=== 2006 ===
As a freshman, Richardson qualified for the state track meet (held at Myers Stadium on the University of Texas campus) in the discus (an event in which she would eventually qualify all four years), taking seventh place (103 feet 10 inches; 31.65 metres).

=== 2007 ===
She qualified for the state track meet in the discus, high jump, and long jump. She placed fourth in the discus (114 feet 2 inches; 34.80 metres, sixth in the high jump (5 feet 0 inches; 1.52 metres) and captured the title in the long jump (18 feet 10 inches; 5.74 metres), earning a total of 15 points. Rochelle had one other qualifier, who finished in sixth place in her event for one point. The 16 points placed Rochelle in a tie for 12th place in the final team standings.

=== 2008 ===
Richardson qualified in the discus, high jump, long jump, 100 metres, and 200 metres. The other two girls on her track team did not qualify in any state events.

On the first day of competition, Richardson won the high jump (5 feet 5 inches; 1.65 metres), placed second in the long jump (18 feet 7 inches; 5.66 metres), and third in the discus (121 feet; 37 metres). She earned 24 points, enough to take the school lead.

On the second day, Richardson won the 200 metres (25.03 seconds) and was second in the 100 metres (12.19 seconds), losing by one-hundredth of a second. The additional 18 points gave her (and Rochelle) a total of 42, six ahead of second place teams Chilton and Seymour, neither of which had any chance of overtaking her in the relays. Richardson's performance would have tied for second in Class 2A and placed sixth in Class 3A.

Richardson became the first female, and only the third person, to singlehandedly win a Texas state team title, joining James Segrest (Class 2A Bangs in 1954) and Frank Pollard (Class B Meridian in 1976). Her success caused other schools' coaches to call asking how to also obtain a "caliche" training surface. Richardson became one of the most-recruited high school female athletes in Texas history, with Arizona State, Nebraska, Texas Christian, Texas Tech, Texas A&M, Arkansas, and many other Division 1 universities showing interest. In the fall, she signed a letter of intent with Texas A&M.

=== 2009 ===
As a senior, Richardson comprised the entire Rochelle girls' track team, and qualified for the same five events as in 2008.

On the first day, she recaptured her 2007 title in the long jump (17 feet 4.50 inches; 5.2959 metres), successfully defended her title in the high jump (5 feet 8 inches; 1.73 metres), and placed second in the discus (126 feet 9 inches; 38.63 metres, her best state placement in this event). Once again, her point total (28) put Rochelle in first place after one day.

On the second day, Richardson placed third in the 200 metres (25.78 seconds) and fourth in the 100 metres (12.51 seconds). Her 38 points were two better than second-place Cayuga High School. Cayuga had a chance to win the overall team award by placing fifth or better in the final relay race (or tie Rochelle with a sixth-place finish), but finished in seventh.

The accomplishment made Richardson the only person in Texas high school track and field history (male or female) to single-handedly win the team title more than once.

=== Other accomplishments ===
In addition to her track exploits, Richardson was named the Class A Division II high school basketball player of the year and led her team to the 2008 Class A Division II state semifinals. She was the valedictorian of her class of 14 and president of the Rochelle High chapter of the National Honor Society.

== Collegiate career ==
After three seasons of limited success competing in heptathlon and javelin for the Texas A&M Aggies, Richardson switched to rugby, where she was named to the 2013 Women's Collegiate All-Americans.

She graduated in 2013 with a degree in Rangeland Ecology and Management.

As of 2019, Richardson plays for the Houston Athletic Rugby Club.
