= Fife, Texas =

- Unincorporated Community
- Location within Texas
- Coordinates: 31°23′26″N 99°23′04″W
- Country: United States
- State: Texas
- County: McCulloch
- Elevation: 1,447 ft (441 m)
- Time zone: UTC-6 (Central (CST))
  - Summer (DST): UTC-5 (CDT)
- ZIP codes: 76825
- Area code: 325
- GNIS feature ID: 1379764

Fife is an unincorporated community in McCulloch County, Texas, United States. According to the Handbook of Texas, the community had an estimated population of 32 in 2000 and was established by Robert Kaye Finlay.

The community was named after Fife, in Scotland, the ancestral home of a first settler.
