= Brady Independent School District =

School district in Texas

Location
- 1003 West 11th Street; Brady, Texas ESC Region 15 USA
- Coordinates: 31°8′9″N 99°20′6″W

District information
- Type: Independent school district
- Grades: Pre-K through 12
- Established: 1885
- Superintendent: Dr. Hector Martinez
- Schools: 3 (2009-10)
- NCES District ID: 4811110

Students and staff
- Students: 1,261 (2010-11)
- Teachers: 118.30 (2009-10) (on full-time equivalent (FTE) basis)
- Student–teacher ratio: 10.75 (2009-10)
- Athletic conference: UIL Class 3A Football Division I
- District mascot: Bulldogs
- Colors: Black, Vegas Gold

Other information
- TEA District Accountability Rating for 2011-12: Recognized
- Website: Brady ISD

Brady Independent School District is a public school district based in Brady, Texas (USA). In addition to Brady, the district also serves the town of Melvin. Located in McCulloch County, a small portion of Brady ISD extends into eastern Concho County.

== Finances ==
As of the 2010–2011 school year, the appraised valuation of property in the district was $350,855,000. The maintenance tax rate was $0.104 and the bond tax rate was $0.033 per $100 of appraised valuation.

== Academic achievement ==
In 2011, the school district was rated "recognized" by the Texas Education Agency. Thirty-five percent of districts in Texas in 2011 received the same rating. No state accountability ratings will be given to districts in 2012. A school district in Texas can receive one of four possible rankings from the Texas Education Agency: Exemplary (the highest possible ranking), Recognized, Academically Acceptable, and Academically Unacceptable (the lowest possible ranking).

Historical district TEA accountability ratings

- 2011: Recognized
- 2010: Recognized
- 2009: Academically Acceptable
- 2008: Academically Acceptable
- 2007: Academically Acceptable
- 2006: Academically Acceptable
- 2005: Academically Acceptable
- 2004: Academically Acceptable

== Schools ==
In the 2011–2012 school year, the district had students in four schools.

Regular instructional

- Brady High School (Grades 9–12)
- Brady Middle (Grades 6–8)
- Brady Elementary (Grades PK-5)

Alternative instructional

- Alternative Education Program (Grades 6–12)

=== Athletics ===
Brady was awarded the 1959 Class AA state football championship via forfeit over Stamford (the actual score was 19-14 Stamford). This was the first and, as of 2008, one of only two instances where a Texas state football championship was awarded via forfeit. The other instance was in 1988 when Converse Judson was awarded the Class AAAAA championship over Dallas Carter.

== See also ==
- List of school districts in Texas
- List of high schools in Texas
