= Placid, Texas =

Unincorporated community in Texas, US

Coordinates: 31°19′32″N 99°11′04″W

Placid is an unincorporated community in McCulloch County, Texas, United States.

== History ==
A post office called Placid was established in 1908, and remained in operation until 1965. The community was so named on account of the tranquility of the original site.
