= Stamford High School (Texas) =

Location
- 700 East Reynolds Street; Stamford, Texas 79553-5701; United States; 32.939897°N 99.793190°W

Information
- School type: Public High School
- School district: Stamford Independent School District
- Principal: Greg London (2016)
- Teaching staff: 21.98 (FTE)
- Grades: 9–12
- Enrollment: 183 (2023–2024)
- Student to teacher ratio: 8.33
- Colors: Blue & White
- Athletics conference: UIL Class AA
- Mascot: Bulldog
- Yearbook: The Bulldog
- Website: Stamford High School

Stamford High School is a public high school located in Stamford, Texas and classified as a 2A school by the University Interscholastic League (UIL). It is part of the Stamford Independent School District located in north central Jones County. In 2013, the school was rated "Met Standard" by the Texas Education Agency.

== Athletics ==
The Stamford Bulldogs compete in these sports:

- Baseball
- Basketball
- Cross country
- Football
- Golf
- Powerlifting
- Softball
- Tennis
- Track and field

=== State titles ===
- Football -
  - 1955(2A), 1956(2A), 1958(2A), 2012(1A/D1), 2013(1A/D1)
- Boys' Golf -
  - 1954(1A)
- Boys' Track -
  - 1957(1A), 1997(2A), 2009(1A)
- Girls' Softball
  - 2021(2A)

^Stamford was stripped of the 1959 Class AA state football championship by the UIL resulting in Brady winning by forfeit 2-0. (the actual score was 19-14 Stamford). This was the first and (as of 2008) one of only two instances where a Texas state football championship was awarded via forfeit.

=== State finalists ===
- Football
  - 1959(1A/D1) **2011(1A/D1)**2024(2A/D1)
- Girls Basketball
  - 2022(2A)

== Notable alumni ==
- James Washington (class of 2014), NFL wide receiver
