= Salt Gap, Texas =

- Unincorporated community
- Location within Texas Location within the United States
- Coordinates: 31°18′14″N 99°35′57″W
- Country: United States
- State: Texas
- County: McCulloch
- Elevation: 1,670 ft (510 m)
- Time zone: UTC-6 (Central (CST))
  - Summer (DST): UTC-5 (CDT)
- Area code: 325
- GNIS feature ID: 1380482

Salt Gap is an unincorporated community in McCulloch County, Texas, United States. Salt Gap is located at the junction of FMs 503 and 504 in western McCulloch County. The community had a post office from 1905 to 1913 and from 1924 to after 1930. Its population was 25 as of 2000.
