= McCulloch County Courthouse =

- U.S. National Register of Historic Places
- Texas State Antiquities Landmark
- Recorded Texas Historic Landmark
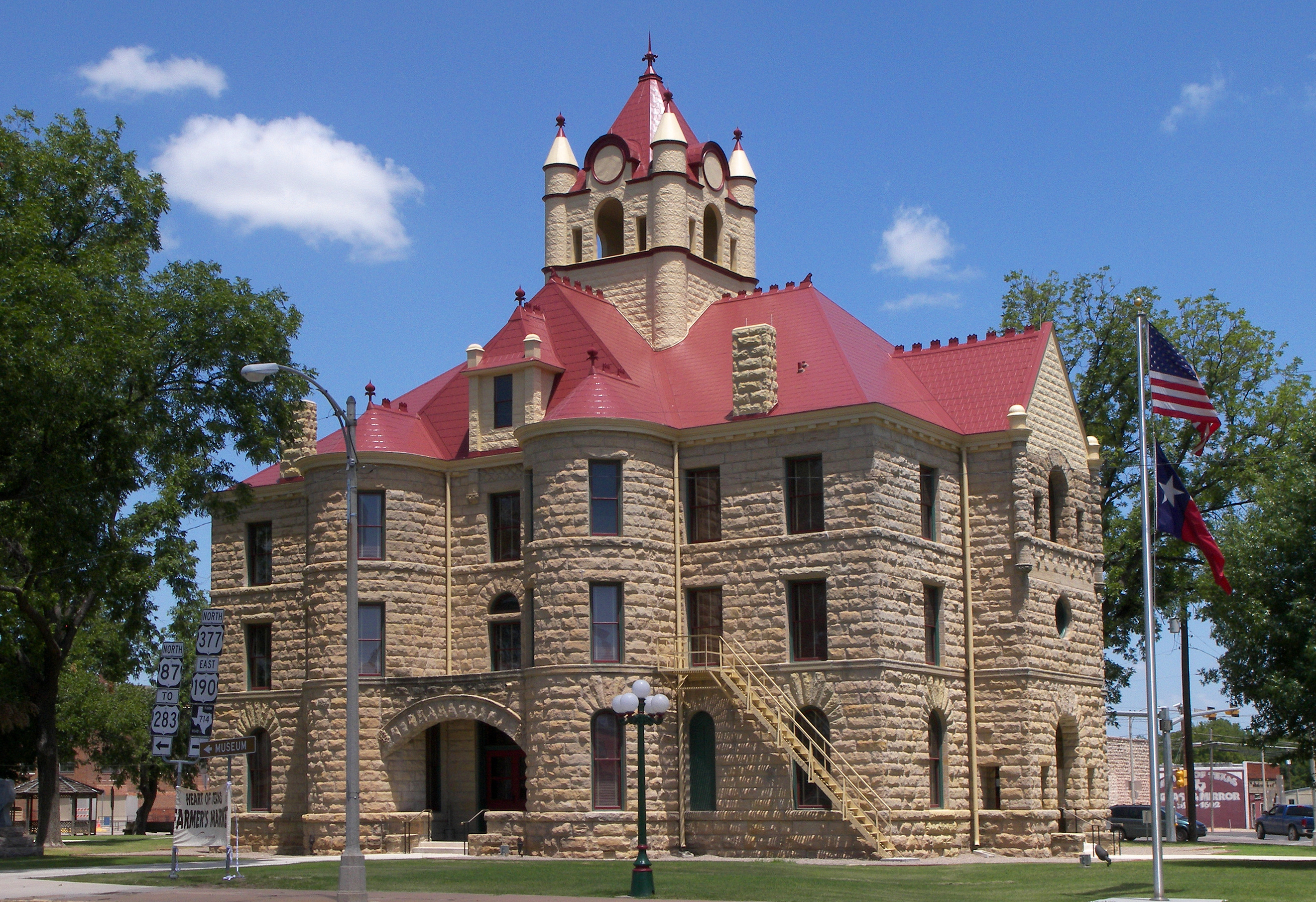
- McCulloch County Courthouse in 2010

- Location within Texas Location within the United States
- Location: Public Square; Brady, Texas
- Coordinates: 31°9′6″N 99°20′5″W
- Area: 2 acres (0.81 ha)
- Built: 1899
- Architect: Martin & Moodie
- Architectural style: Richardsonian Romanesque
- NRHP reference No.: 77001515
- TSAL No.: 469
- RTHL No.: 3286

Significant dates
- Added to NRHP: December 16, 1977
- Designated TSAL: May 28, 1981
- Designated RTHL: 1967

The McCulloch County Courthouse is located in Brady, McCulloch County, in the U.S. state of Texas. It was added to the National Register of Historic Places listings in McCulloch County, Texas in 1977, and became a Recorded Texas Historic Landmark in 1967.

== History ==
This is the second courthouse to serve McCulloch County. The first county building was erected in 1879. The current courthouse was completed in 1900, and the datestone was laid by the Brady Lodge of the Freemasons on September 29, 1899. Martin & Moodie of Comanche are listed as the builders, with no separate name for an architect. When the decision was made in 1899 to erect a new courthouse, Martin & Moodie submitted their proposal and were awarded the contract. The new three-story sandstone courthouse was in the Richardson Romanesque style, and bears some semblance to the style of architect James Riely Gordon. While the clock tower has areas designed for a clock on each of the four sides, no clock is installed. The courthouse underwent a renovation in 2009, part of which gave the structure a red roof. In both 1936 and 1938, Brady Creek (San Saba River) overflowed its banks and caused flooding in and around the courthouse.

== Heart of Texas monument ==
In 1963, the Texas Historical Commission designated the geographical center of Texas as being located 5 miles (8.0 km) northwest of Brady. On the courthouse grounds is a Heart of Texas granite marker designed by Earl V. Finlay. The actual carving and inscription were done in 1958 by Brady native son Gary Bryson. Funding for the 7 feet 6 inches (2.29 m) monument was provided by the Brady Chamber of Commerce and the McCulloch County Commissioners' Court.

== See also ==
- National Register of Historic Places listings in McCulloch County, Texas
- Recorded Texas Historic Landmarks in McCulloch County
- List of county courthouses in Texas
