= Pear Valley, Texas =

- Unincorporated Community
- Location within Texas
- Coordinates: 31°18′37″N 99°29′38″W
- Country: United States
- State: Texas
- County: McCulloch
- Elevation: 1,581 ft (482 m)
- Time zone: UTC-6 (Central (CST))
  - Summer (DST): UTC-5 (CDT)
- ZIP codes: 76852
- Area code: 325
- GNIS feature ID: 1380334

Pear Valley is an unincorporated community in McCulloch County, Texas, United States. According to the Handbook of Texas, the community had an estimated population of 37 in 2000.

Pear Valley contains two churches and two businesses. Pear Valley sits between state highways 83 and 283.
