= Stamford Independent School District =

School district in Texas

Stamford Independent School District is a public school district based in Stamford, Texas (US). Located in Jones County, a portion of the district extends into Haskell County.

== Schools ==
- Stamford High School
- Stamford Middle School
- Oliver Elementary School

Stamford High School won state football championships in 1955, 1956, 1958, 2012, and 2013. The team also won the 1959 game over Brady, but was forced to forfeit the game, the first instance in UIL football history (and only one of two such instances) where the championship was later forfeited.

In 2009, the school district was rated "academically acceptable" by the Texas Education Agency.
