= Brady High School (Texas) =

Coordinates: 31.1075°N 99.3388°W

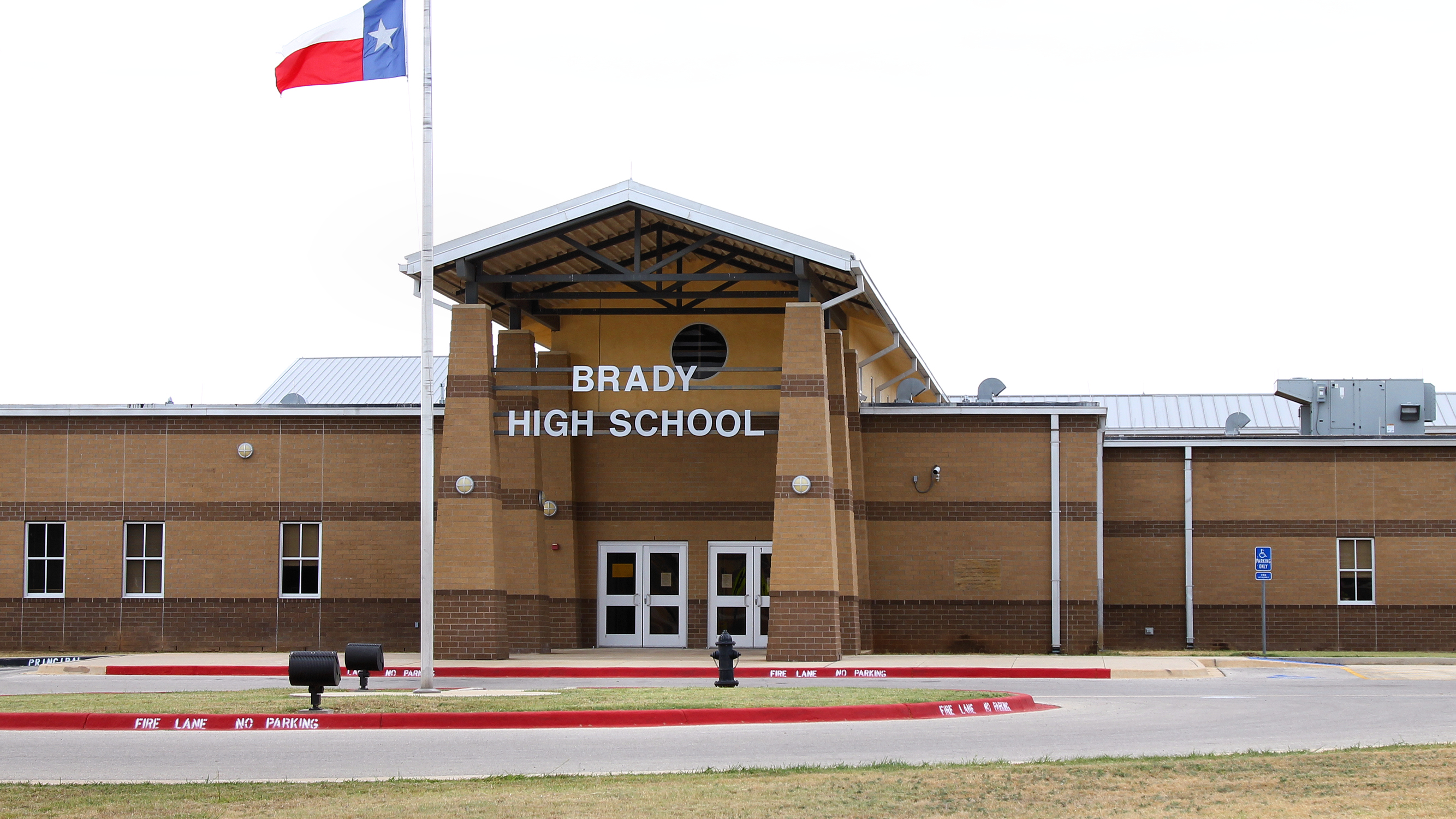

Location
- 2307 Menard Hwy; Brady, Texas 76825-5330; United States

Information
- School type: Public High School
- School district: Brady Independent School District
- Principal: Lori Holubec
- Teaching staff: 27.41 (FTE)
- Grades: 9-12
- Enrollment: 292 (2023-2024)
- Student to teacher ratio: 10.65
- Colors: Black and Vegas gold
- Athletics conference: UIL Class AAA
- Mascot: Bulldog
- Yearbook: The Bulldog
- Website: Brady High School

Brady High School is a public high school located in Brady, Texas (USA) and classified as a 3A school by the UIL. It is part of the Brady Independent School District located in south central McCulloch County. In 2015, the school was rated "Met Standard" by the Texas Education Agency.

== Athletics ==
The Brady Bulldogs compete in these sports

Cross Country, Football, Basketball, Powerlifting, Golf, Tennis, Track, Softball & Baseball

=== State titles ===
- Football -
  - 1959(2A)^
- Boys Golf -
  - 1960(1A), 1962(2A) Bob Archer Charles Dicker Jlmmy Criswell Karlton Steffens, 1964(2A) Charles Dicker Karlton Steffens Jimmy Criswell Paul Priess
- Boys Track -
  - 1939(All), 1950(1A), 1951(1A)
- Boys Singles Tennis-
  - Jack Marshall 2018(3A)
  - Jack Marshall 2019(3A)

==== State finalists ====
- Football -
  - 1956(2A), 1957(2A)

^Brady was awarded the 1959 Class AA state football championship via forfeit over Stamford (the actual score was 19-14 Stamford). This was the first and, as of 2013, one of only two instances where a Texas state football championship was awarded via forfeit.

== Notable alumni ==
- Scott Appleton, former American Football League player
