= Lohn, Texas =

Unincorporated community in Texas, US

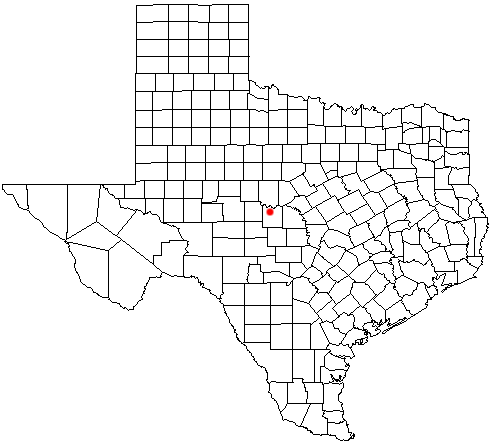
Location of Lohn in the state of Texas

Lohn is an unincorporated community in McCulloch County, Texas, United States. According to the Handbook of Texas, the community had an estimated population of 149 in 2000.

== Geography ==
Lohn is located at 31°19′26″N 99°24′36″W. It is situated two miles west of U.S. Highway 183, near the junction of Farm Roads 504 and 2635 in northern McCulloch County.

== History ==
The area was first settled by William F. Lohn and his family in 1879. They were joined by several other German families in 1881. Morgan Stacy built a store in the community and ran the post office when it became operational in 1891. A church and flour mill had opened by 1893. A one-room school house was also constructed that year. When Lohn Central School was completed in 1896, smaller schools in the nearby communities of Cow Creek and Salt Gap were consolidated with it.

Lohn remained a small community well into the early 20th century. In 1914, around 70 people lived in Lohn. The population had quadrupled to 360 by 1931. After peaking, that figure declined to 250 in the 1940s and 100 by the mid-1960s. It recovered slightly in the late 1980s before stabilizing around 150, where it presently remains.

== Education ==
Public education in the community of Lohn is provided by the Lohn Independent School District. The district consists of a single PK-12 campus, Lohn School that serves Lohn and the surrounding rural areas in northern McCulloch County.

== Climate ==
The climate in this area is characterized by hot, humid summers and generally mild to cool winters. According to the Köppen climate classification system, Lohn has a humid subtropical climate, Cfa on climate maps.
