= Brady Creek (San Saba River tributary) =

River in San Saba, McCulloch, and Concho counties in Texas, United States

Brady Creek (San Saba River)

Location
- Country: United States

Physical characteristics
- Source
  - location: Texas
- Mouth: San Saba River
  - coordinates: 31.128°N 98.98771°W
  - elevation: 1,309 feet (399 m)
- Length: 90 mi (140 km)

Brady Creek is a river in San Saba, McCulloch, and Concho counties in western Texas, United States, that is a tributary of the San Saba River. Its mouth is about 17 miles (27 km) south-southwest of San Saba. Brady Creek Reservoir impounds its water in western Brady.

== See also ==
- List of rivers of Texas
