= Lohn Independent School District =

School district in Texas

Coordinates: 31.3231°N 99.4096°W

The Lohn Independent School District is a public school district based in the community of Lohn, Texas, United States.

In 2009, the school district was rated "academically acceptable" by the Texas Education Agency.

== Lohn School ==
Lohn ISD consists of a single PK-12 campus Lohn School that serves Lohn and the surrounding rural areas in northern McCulloch County.

== History ==
The history of public education in Lohn dates back to the late nineteenth century. A one-room school house was constructed in 1893. Three years later, the Lohn Central School was completed and two smaller schools in the neighboring communities of Cow Creek and Salt Gap consolidated with it.

In 1915, a two-story brick school building was built. As Lohn continued to grow, the need for a larger school led to the construction of another building in 1934. That school housed the majority of classes until it was replaced by the present facility in 2004. Successful alumni include attorney Leslie Schkade.

== Special programs ==
=== Athletics ===
Lohn High School plays six-man football.

== See also ==
- List of school districts in Texas
