= Rochelle Independent School District =

School district in Texas

Coordinates: 31.2236°N 99.2052°W

Location
- Rochelle, TX ESC Region 15 USA

District information
- Type: Public
- Grades: Pre-K through 12
- Superintendent: Steve Butler

Students and staff
- Athletic conference: UIL Class A (six-man football participant)
- District mascot: Hornet
- Colors: Royal Blue, Gold, and White

Other information
- Website: www.rochelleisd.net

Rochelle Independent School District is a public school district based in the community of Rochelle, Texas (USA). The district has one school, Rochelle School that serves students in grades kindergarten through twelve.

== Academic achievement ==
In 2009, the school district was rated "academically acceptable" by the Texas Education Agency.

== Special programs ==
=== Athletics ===
Rochelle High School plays six-man football.

== See also ==
- List of school districts in Texas
