= McCulloch County, Texas =

County in Texas, United States

- County
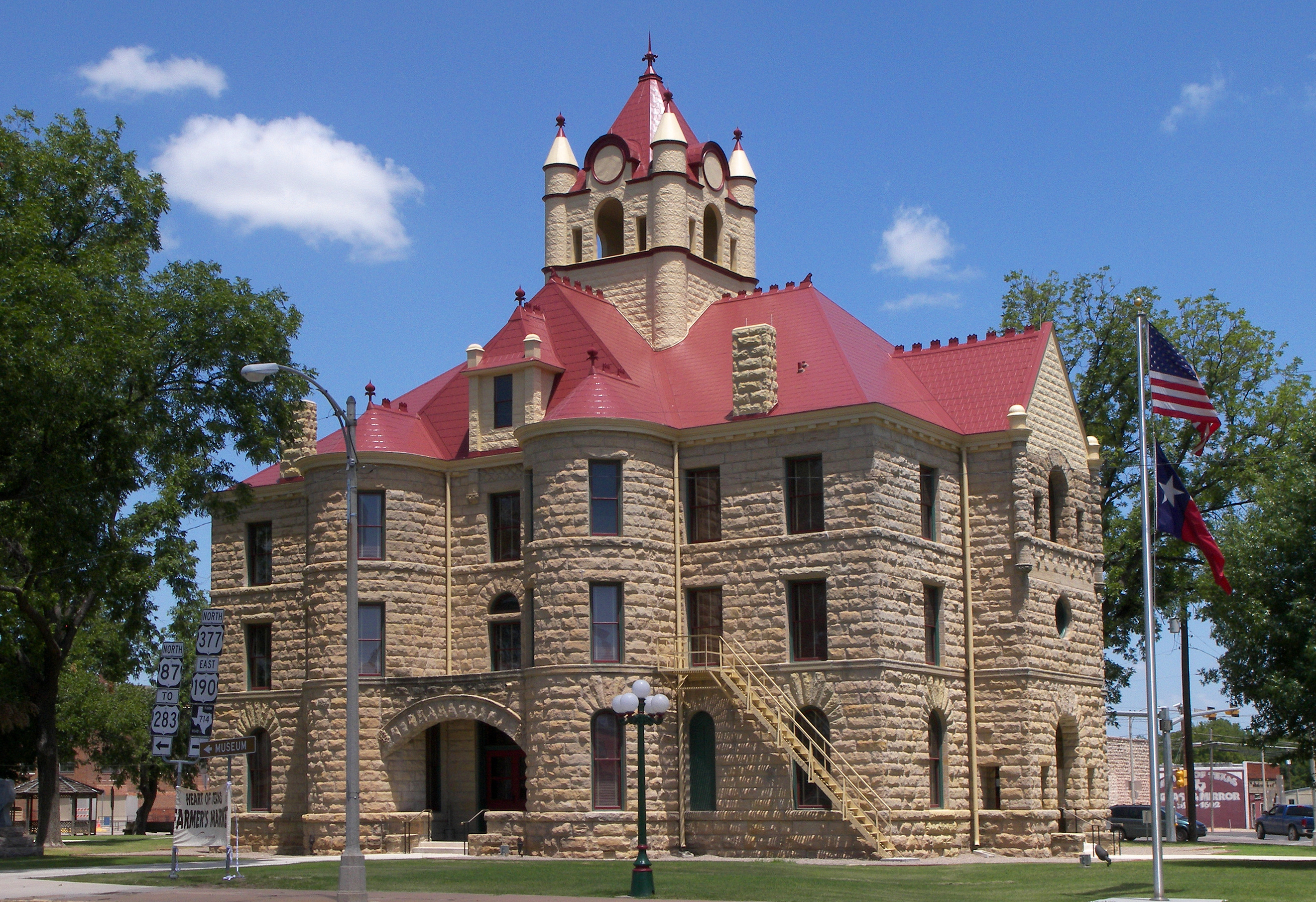
- The McCulloch County Courthouse in Brady

- Location within the U.S. state of Texas
- Coordinates: 31°12′N 99°21′W
- Country: United States
- State: Texas
- Founded: 1876
- Named for: Benjamin McCulloch
- Seat: Brady
- Largest city: Brady

Area
  - Total: 1,073 sq mi (2,780 km^{2})
  - Land: 1,066 sq mi (2,760 km^{2})
  - Water: 7.8 sq mi (20 km^{2}) 0.7%

Population (2020)
  - Total: 7,630
  - Estimate (2025): 7,472 ▼
  - Density: 7.16/sq mi (2.76/km^{2})
- Time zone: UTC−6 (Central)
  - Summer (DST): UTC−5 (CDT)
- Congressional district: 11th
- Website: www.co.mcculloch.tx.us

McCulloch County is a county located on the Edwards Plateau in the U.S. state of Texas. At the 2020 census, its population was 7,630. Its county seat is Brady. The county was created in 1856 and later organized in 1876. It is named for Benjamin McCulloch, a famous Texas Ranger and Confederate general.

The geographical center of Texas lies within McCulloch County, near Brady.

== History ==
From 5000 BC to 1500 AD, the early Native American inhabitants included Tonkawa, Lipan Apache, Comanche, and Tawakoni. The 1788 José Mares expedition passed through the area while travelling from San Antonio to Santa Fe.

On November 21, 1831, in the Brady vicinity, James Bowie, Rezin P. Bowie, David Buchanan, Cephas D. Hamm, Matthew Doyle, Jesse Wallace, Thomas McCaslin, Robert Armstrong, and James Coryell with two servants, Charles and Gonzales, held at bay for a day and a night 164 Caddo and Lipans. After 80 warriors had been killed, the Indians withdrew. Camp San Saba was established in 1852 to protect settlers from Indians. The Sixth Texas Legislature in 1856 formed McCulloch County from Bexar County, and named it for Benjamin McCulloch. The Voca waterwheel mill was built in 1876.

The Brady Sentinel was established by D.F. Hayes in 1880 as the county's first newspaper. Later, it was absorbed by the Heart o’ Texas News run by R.B. Boyle. During 1886–1912, the Swedish colonies of East Sweden, West Sweden and Melvin were established. From 1897 to 1910, the Brady Enterprise or McCulloch County Enterprise was published. In 1899, the McCulloch County sandstone courthouse built in the Romanesque Revival style by architects Martin and Moodie. In the last year of the 19th century, the Milburn Messenger was edited by T.F. Harwell. Cotton became a major county crop. Three years later, the Fort Worth and Rio Grande Railway came to McCulloch County. W.D. Currie published the Mercury Mascot from 1904 to 1907. In 1906–1910, the McCulloch County Star was published. In 1909, the Brady Standard, edited by F.W. Schwenker, began publication, and absorbed the McCulloch County Star and the Brady Enterprise in 1910. The Rochelle Record was started by W.D. Cowan in 1909. The Melvin Rustler began publication in 1915. in 1917, J. Marvin Hunter founded the Melvin Enterprise.

During the 1920s, McCulloch County billed itself as "the Turkey Center of the Universe", and held an annual Turkey Trot.

Tenant farming in the county peaked at 60% in the 1930s.

The Colorado River flooded in 1932, cresting at 62.2 feet (19.0 m). In 1938, Brady Creek flooded, cresting at 29.1 feet (8.9 m). The San Saba River flooded, cresting at 39.8 feet (12.1 m).

Curtis Field, named for Brady Mayor Harry L. Curtis, opened as a flying school in 1941, with 80 students. A county prisoner-of-war camp was set up in 1943; it housed members of Rommel's Afrika Corps, the S.S., and the Gestapo. Crockett State School took over the former POW camp in 1946, and used it as a training school for delinquent black girls.

From 1954 to 1960, 48 restraining structures were installed in the county to control flooding. Brady Creek Reservoir was constructed to partially control flooding on Brady Creek in 1963. A tourist information marker placed in the county, declaring the geographical center of Texas.

== Geography ==
According to the U.S. Census Bureau, the county has a total area of 1,073 square miles (2,780 km^{2}), of which 1,066 square miles (2,760 km^{2}) are land and 7.8 square miles (20 km^{2}) (0.7%) are covered by water.

=== Major highways ===
- U.S. Highway 87
- U.S. Highway 190
- U.S. Highway 283
- U.S. Highway 377
- State Highway 71

=== Adjacent counties ===
- Coleman County (north)
- Brown County (northeast)
- San Saba County (east)
- Mason County (south)
- Menard County (southwest)
- Concho County (west)

== Demographics ==
Historical population
Census	Pop.	Note	%±
1870	173		—
1880	1,533		786.1%
1890	3,217		109.8%
1900	3,960		23.1%
1910	13,405		238.5%
1920	11,020		−17.8%
1930	13,883		26.0%
1940	13,208		−4.9%
1950	11,701		−11.4%
1960	8,815		−24.7%
1970	8,571		−2.8%
1980	8,735		1.9%
1990	8,778		0.5%
2000	8,205		−6.5%
2010	8,283		1.0%
2020	7,630		−7.9%
2025 (est.)	7,472	▼	−2.1%
U.S. Decennial Census; 1850–2010 2010 2020

=== 2020 census ===
As of the 2020 census, the county had a population of 7,630. The median age was 47.5 years. 21.6% of residents were under the age of 18 and 25.4% of residents were 65 years of age or older. For every 100 females there were 96.4 males, and for every 100 females age 18 and over there were 93.7 males age 18 and over.

The racial makeup of the county was 76.3% White, 1.3% Black or African American, 0.5% American Indian and Alaska Native, 0.5% Asian, <0.1% Native Hawaiian and Pacific Islander, 7.4% from some other race, and 14.0% from two or more races. Hispanic or Latino residents of any race comprised 31.0% of the population.

64.0% of residents lived in urban areas, while 36.0% lived in rural areas.

There were 3,231 households in the county, of which 26.4% had children under the age of 18 living in them. Of all households, 47.8% were married-couple households, 20.0% were households with a male householder and no spouse or partner present, and 26.4% were households with a female householder and no spouse or partner present. About 30.1% of all households were made up of individuals and 16.4% had someone living alone who was 65 years of age or older.

There were 4,220 housing units, of which 23.4% were vacant. Among occupied housing units, 71.3% were owner-occupied and 28.7% were renter-occupied. The homeowner vacancy rate was 3.1% and the rental vacancy rate was 14.2%.

=== Racial and ethnic composition ===
McCulloch County, Texas – Racial and ethnic composition Note: the US Census treats Hispanic/Latino as an ethnic category. This table excludes Latinos from the racial categories and assigns them to a separate category. Hispanics/Latinos may be of any race.
Race / Ethnicity (NH = Non-Hispanic)	Pop 1980	Pop 1990	Pop 2000	Pop 2010	Pop 2020	% 1980	% 1990	% 2000	% 2010	% 2020
White alone (NH)	6,801	6,289	5,792	5,568	4,904	77.86%	71.65%	70.59%	67.22%	64.27%
Black or African American alone (NH)	210	151	123	133	92	2.40%	1.72%	1.50%	1.61%	1.21%
Native American or Alaska Native alone (NH)	16	14	18	23	7	0.18%	0.16%	0.22%	0.28%	0.09%
Asian alone (NH)	17	7	14	28	39	0.19%	0.08%	0.17%	0.34%	0.51%
Native Hawaiian or Pacific Islander alone (NH)	x	x	1	1	0	x	x	0.01%	0.01%	0.00%
Other race alone (NH)	25	0	3	9	12	0.29%	0.00%	0.04%	0.11%	0.16%
Mixed race or Multiracial (NH)	x	x	35	45	207	x	x	0.43%	0.54%	2.71%
Hispanic or Latino (any race)	1,666	2,317	2,219	2,476	2,369	19.07%	26.40%	27.04%	29.89%	31.05%
Total	8,735	8,778	8,205	8,283	7,630	100.00%	100.00%	100.00%	100.00%	100.00%

=== 2000 census ===
At the 2000 census, 8,205 people, 3,277 households and 2,267 families resided in the county. The population density was 8 people per square mile (3.1 people/km^{2}). The 4,184 housing units averaged 4 units per square mile (1.5/km^{2}). The racial makeup of the county was 84.64% White, 1.57% Black or African American, 0.26% Native American, 0.17% Asian, 0.01% Pacific Islander, 11.71% from other races, and 1.63% from two or more races. About 27% of the population were Hispanic or Latinos of any race.

Of the 3,277 households, 30.70% had children under the age of 18 living with them, 55.30% were married couples living together, 10.20% had a female householder with no husband present, and 30.80% were not families. About 28.20% of all households were made up of individuals, and 15.80% had someone living alone who was 65 years of age or older. The average household size was 2.47 and the average family size was 3.01. About 26.60% of the population were under the age of 18, 6.60% from 18 to 24, 22.90% from 25 to 44, 24.30% from 45 to 64, and 19.50% who were 65 years of age or older. The median age was 40 years. For every 100 females, there were 90.10 males. For every 100 females age 18 and over, there were 86.00 males.

The median household income was $25,705 and family income was $30,783. Males had a median income of $25,844 versus $18,337 for females. The per capita income for the county was $14,579. About 17.30% of families and 22.50% of the population were below the poverty line, including 28.40% of those under age 18 and 21.50% of those age 65 or over.

== Government and infrastructure ==
In 1947, the State of Texas opened the Brady State School for Negro Girls in McCulloch County, near Brady on a former prisoner of war camp leased from the federal government of the United States. In 1950, the state replaced the Brady facility with the Crockett State School.

=== Politics ===
United States presidential election results for McCulloch County, Texas
Year	Republican		Democratic		Third party(ies)	
Year	No.	%	No.	%	No.	%
1912	41	4.85%	595	70.33%	210	24.82%
1916	61	5.95%	847	82.63%	117	11.41%
1920	210	19.16%	780	71.17%	106	9.67%
1924	495	26.84%	1,327	71.96%	22	1.19%
1928	1,294	63.59%	741	36.41%	0	0.00%
1932	265	11.64%	2,006	88.10%	6	0.26%
1936	323	15.30%	1,772	83.94%	16	0.76%
1940	443	15.73%	2,373	84.27%	0	0.00%
1944	463	16.51%	2,088	74.47%	253	9.02%
1948	393	14.86%	2,166	81.92%	85	3.21%
1952	1,788	52.28%	1,623	47.46%	9	0.26%
1956	1,292	52.63%	1,158	47.17%	5	0.20%
1960	1,165	42.39%	1,579	57.46%	4	0.15%
1964	655	23.72%	2,100	76.06%	6	0.22%
1968	947	35.61%	1,353	50.88%	359	13.50%
1972	1,769	70.06%	753	29.82%	3	0.12%
1976	1,300	40.54%	1,888	58.87%	19	0.59%
1980	1,572	46.70%	1,750	51.99%	44	1.31%
1984	2,060	58.82%	1,433	40.92%	9	0.26%
1988	1,618	49.13%	1,665	50.56%	10	0.30%
1992	1,108	31.74%	1,393	39.90%	990	28.36%
1996	1,465	48.70%	1,231	40.92%	312	10.37%
2000	2,084	71.37%	794	27.19%	42	1.44%
2004	2,465	76.55%	745	23.14%	10	0.31%
2008	2,263	75.18%	728	24.19%	19	0.63%
2012	2,419	80.82%	537	17.94%	37	1.24%
2016	2,552	82.24%	482	15.53%	69	2.22%
2020	2,904	84.52%	490	14.26%	42	1.22%
2024	3,033	86.34%	455	12.95%	25	0.71%

United States Senate election results for McCulloch County, Texas1
Year	Republican		Democratic		Third party(ies)	
Year	No.	%	No.	%	No.	%
2024	2,938	83.99%	497	14.21%	63	1.80%

United States Senate election results for McCulloch County, Texas2
Year	Republican		Democratic		Third party(ies)	
Year	No.	%	No.	%	No.	%
2020	2,843	83.99%	460	13.59%	82	2.42%

Texas Gubernatorial election results for McCulloch County
Year	Republican		Democratic		Third party(ies)	
Year	No.	%	No.	%	No.	%
2022	2,221	86.66%	314	12.25%	28	1.09%

== Education ==
The following school districts serve McCulloch County:

- Brady ISD (small portion in Concho County)
- Lohn ISD
- Mason ISD (mostly in Mason County; small portions in Kimble, Menard, and San Saba Counties)
- Rochelle ISD

== Communities ==
=== City ===
- Brady (county seat)

=== Town ===
- Melvin

=== Census-designated place ===
- Rochelle

=== Unincorporated communities ===
- Doole
- Fife
- Lohn
- Mercury
- Milburn
- Pear Valley
- Placid
- Salt Gap
- Voca

== See also ==
- List of museums in West Texas
- National Register of Historic Places listings in McCulloch County, Texas
- Recorded Texas Historic Landmarks in McCulloch County
- Old McCulloch County Jail
