= Brady, Texas =

- City
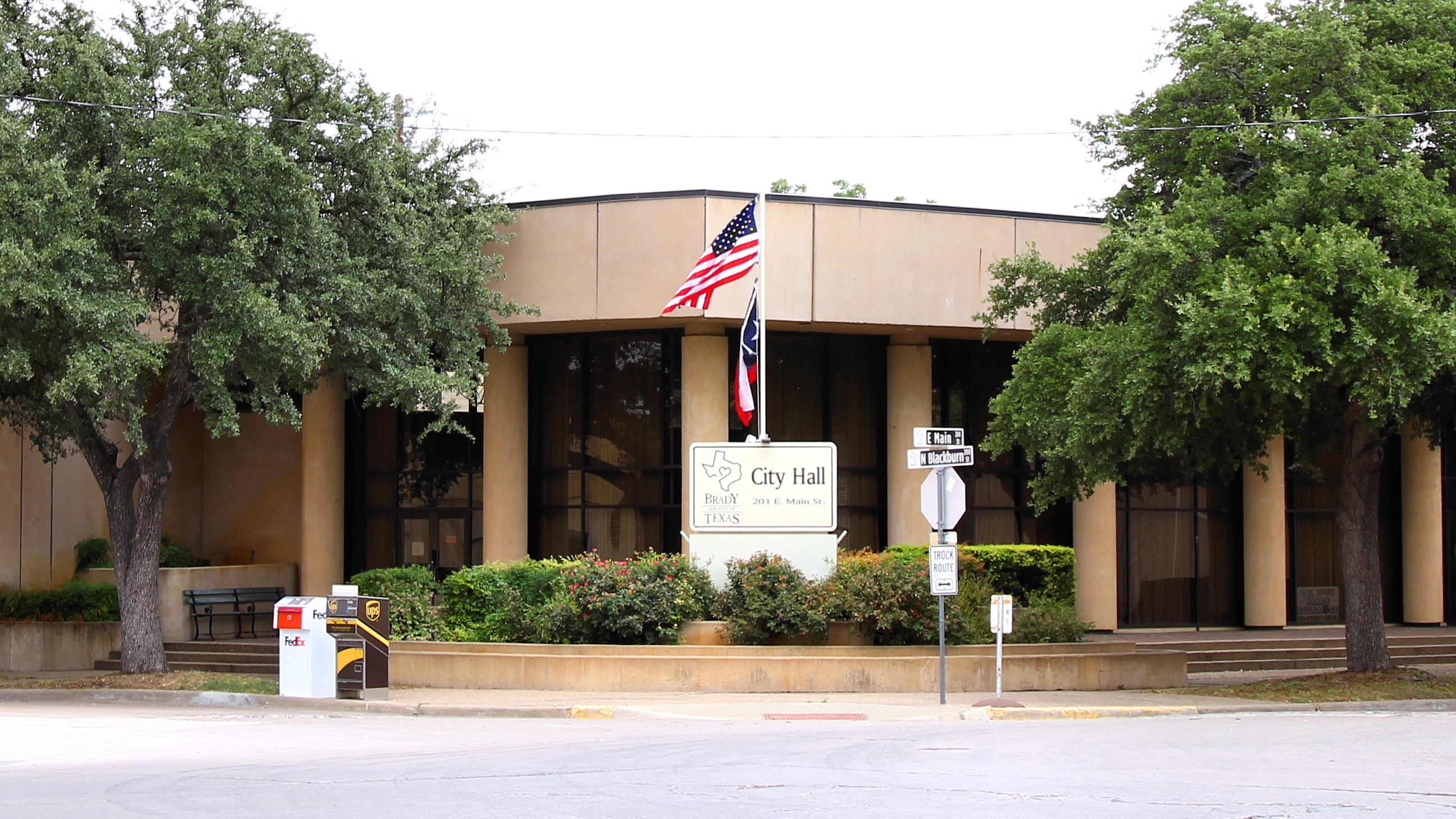
- Brady City Hall
- Nickname: The Heart of Texas
- Interactive map of Brady, Texas
- Coordinates: 31°07′36″N 99°22′20″W
- Country: United States
- State: Texas
- County: McCulloch

Area
  - Total: 11.44 sq mi (29.63 km^{2})
  - Land: 8.94 sq mi (23.16 km^{2})
  - Water: 2.50 sq mi (6.47 km^{2})
- Elevation: 1,736 ft (529 m)

Population (2020)
  - Total: 5,118
- Time zone: UTC-6 (Central (CST))
  - Summer (DST): UTC-5 (CDT)
- ZIP code: 76825
- Area code: 325
- FIPS code: 48-09916
- GNIS feature ID: 2409892
- Website: www.bradytx.us

Brady is a city in McCulloch County, Texas, United States. Brady refers to itself as the "Heart of Texas", as it is the city closest to the geographical center of the state, which is about 15 miles northeast of Brady. Its population was 5,118 at the 2020 census. It is the county seat of McCulloch County.

== Geography ==
According to the United States Census Bureau, Brady has a total area of 11.5 square miles (30 km^{2}), of which 9.2 sq mi (24 km^{2}) are land and 2.3 sq mi (6.0 km^{2}) (20.16%) are covered by water.

=== Major highways ===
- U.S. Highway 87
- U.S. Highway 190
- U.S. Highway 283
- U.S. Highway 377
- State Highway 71

=== Climate ===
The climate in this area is characterized by hot, humid summers and generally mild to cool winters. According to the Köppen climate classification, Brady has a humid subtropical climate, Cfa on climate maps.

Climate data for Brady, Texas (1991–2020 normals, extremes 1893–present)
Month	Jan	Feb	Mar	Apr	May	Jun	Jul	Aug	Sep	Oct	Nov	Dec	Year
Record high °F (°C)	91 (33)	99 (37)	97 (36)	103 (39)	107 (42)	110 (43)	111 (44)	112 (44)	109 (43)	103 (39)	92 (33)	91 (33)	112 (44)
Mean maximum °F (°C)	79.9 (26.6)	83.0 (28.3)	88.5 (31.4)	93.7 (34.3)	98.0 (36.7)	100.1 (37.8)	101.8 (38.8)	101.6 (38.7)	97.5 (36.4)	93.2 (34.0)	85.0 (29.4)	80.2 (26.8)	103.8 (39.9)
Mean daily maximum °F (°C)	58.4 (14.7)	62.4 (16.9)	69.7 (20.9)	77.2 (25.1)	83.6 (28.7)	90.0 (32.2)	93.2 (34.0)	93.7 (34.3)	86.8 (30.4)	78.4 (25.8)	67.4 (19.7)	59.6 (15.3)	76.7 (24.8)
Daily mean °F (°C)	46.9 (8.3)	50.6 (10.3)	58.0 (14.4)	65.2 (18.4)	73.1 (22.8)	79.6 (26.4)	82.5 (28.1)	82.7 (28.2)	76.0 (24.4)	66.5 (19.2)	56.1 (13.4)	48.2 (9.0)	65.5 (18.6)
Mean daily minimum °F (°C)	35.3 (1.8)	38.9 (3.8)	46.3 (7.9)	53.1 (11.7)	62.6 (17.0)	69.2 (20.7)	71.8 (22.1)	71.6 (22.0)	65.2 (18.4)	54.6 (12.6)	44.7 (7.1)	36.8 (2.7)	54.2 (12.3)
Mean minimum °F (°C)	18.8 (−7.3)	22.1 (−5.5)	27.5 (−2.5)	35.7 (2.1)	47.4 (8.6)	59.7 (15.4)	64.0 (17.8)	63.8 (17.7)	50.9 (10.5)	36.7 (2.6)	26.2 (−3.2)	20.7 (−6.3)	15.9 (−8.9)
Record low °F (°C)	−1 (−18)	−3 (−19)	11 (−12)	25 (−4)	37 (3)	44 (7)	54 (12)	47 (8)	33 (1)	22 (−6)	10 (−12)	−2 (−19)	−3 (−19)
Average precipitation inches (mm)	1.33 (34)	1.71 (43)	2.33 (59)	2.05 (52)	3.79 (96)	2.88 (73)	2.11 (54)	2.21 (56)	2.76 (70)	2.71 (69)	1.87 (47)	1.63 (41)	27.38 (695)
Average snowfall inches (cm)	0.0 (0.0)	0.1 (0.25)	0.0 (0.0)	0.0 (0.0)	0.0 (0.0)	0.0 (0.0)	0.0 (0.0)	0.0 (0.0)	0.0 (0.0)	0.0 (0.0)	0.1 (0.25)	0.1 (0.25)	0.3 (0.76)
Average precipitation days (≥ 0.01 in)	5.8	5.6	6.2	5.4	7.6	5.7	4.5	5.2	5.7	6.0	5.6	6.1	69.4
Average snowy days (≥ 0.1 in)	0.0	0.1	0.0	0.0	0.0	0.0	0.0	0.0	0.0	0.0	0.1	0.1	0.3
Source: NOAAIEM

== Demographics ==
Historical population
Census	Pop.	Note	%±
1880	115		—
1890	560		387.0%
1910	2,669		—
1920	2,197		−17.7%
1930	3,983		81.3%
1940	5,002		25.6%
1950	5,944		18.8%
1960	5,338		−10.2%
1970	5,557		4.1%
1980	5,969		7.4%
1990	5,946		−0.4%
2000	5,523		−7.1%
2010	5,528		0.1%
2020	5,118		−7.4%
U.S. Decennial Census

=== 2020 census ===
As of the 2020 census, Brady had a population of 5,118, 2,125 households, and 1,225 families residing in the city. The median age was 43.5 years; 23.6% of residents were under the age of 18 and 22.6% of residents were 65 years of age or older, with 92.9 males per 100 females overall and 89.2 males per 100 females age 18 and over.

92.3% of residents lived in urban areas, while 7.7% lived in rural areas.

There were 2,125 households in Brady, of which 28.4% had children under the age of 18 living with them. Of all households, 42.1% were married couples living together, 20.8% were households with a male householder and no spouse or partner present, and 30.9% were households with a female householder and no spouse or partner present. About 32.4% of all households were made up of individuals and 16.7% had someone living alone who was 65 years of age or older.

There were 2,635 housing units, of which 19.4% were vacant. Among occupied housing units, 63.5% were owner-occupied and 36.5% were renter-occupied. The homeowner vacancy rate was 4.0% and the rental vacancy rate was 15.4%.

Racial composition as of the 2020 census
Race	Percent
White	72.3%
Black or African American	1.7%
American Indian and Alaska Native	0.4%
Asian	0.7%
Native Hawaiian and Other Pacific Islander	<0.1%
Some other race	9.5%
Two or more races	15.3%
Hispanic or Latino (of any race)	37.7%

=== 2000 census ===
As of the census of 2000, 5,523 people, 2,181 households, and 1,448 families resided in the city. The population density was 601.1 inhabitants per square mile (232.1/km^{2}). The 2,603 housing units averaged 283.3 per square mile (109.4/km^{2}). The racial makeup of the city was 59.6% White, 2.2% Black, 0.3% Native American, 0.4% Asian, 0.1% from other races, and 0.6% from two or more races. Hispanics or Latinos of any race were 36.7% of the population.

Of the 2,181 households, 32.6% had children under the age of 18 living with them, 50.7% were married couples living together, 12.2% had a female householder with no husband present, and 33.6% were not families. About 31.3% of all households were made up of individuals, and 17.7% had someone living alone who was 65 years of age or older. The average household size was 2.48 and the average family size was 3.11.

In the city, the population was distributed as 28.4% under the age of 18, 7.6% from 18 to 24, 23.5% from 25 to 44, 21.2% from 45 to 64, and 19.3% who were 65 years of age or older. The median age was 37 years. For every 100 females, there were 85.0 males. For every 100 females age 18 and over, there were 80.2 males.

The median income for a household in the city was $22,961, and for a family was $28,701. Males had a median income of $25,498 versus $17,289 for females. The per capita income for the city was $12,607. About 18.7% of families and 23.5% of the population were below the poverty line, including 27.7% of those under age 18 and 22.1% of those age 65 or over.

== History ==
When the area was settled in the 1870s, the community was named Brady City after Brady Creek, which runs through town. The name was shortened to Brady when the town was incorporated in 1906. In 1787–1788, Spanish explorer José Mares crossed the creek near the site of present Brady. Henry and Nancy Fulcher, the first settlers on Brady Creek, donated land for the townsite in the mid-1870s. Allison Ogden and his father-in-law, Ben Henton, built a store in 1875. A post office opened in 1876. After residents of McCulloch County chose Brady as county seat on May 15, 1876, the town grew fairly quickly. Brady had approximately 50 residents in 1877, and a stone courthouse was completed in 1878.

Thomas Maples began weekly publication of The Brady Sentinel in 1880; by 1884, Brady had two churches, a district school, three stores, two hotels, and 300 residents.

Stock raising was the primary occupation in the Brady area before 1900. In the 1870s and 1880s, local ranchers drove their cattle to markets in Kansas. Most other trade was with Brownwood and Lampasas. The number of farms and fences increased with the influx of immigrants in the late 1880s and 1890s. Poultry, sheep, goats, cotton, and pecans joined cattle as important sources of income for area residents.

When the Fort Worth and Rio Grande Railway arrived in 1903, Brady became a principal shipping point for Central Texas. The Gulf, Colorado and Santa Fe came to Brady in 1912. By 1914, the town had grown to include four churches, two schools, two banks, several processing plants, manufacturing and supply outlets, and 2,669 residents.

In 1926, Brady residents celebrated the building of 42-acre Richards Park by holding a two-day barbecue on the Fourth of July weekend; it was such a success that the celebration was labeled the "July Jubilee" and became an annual event.

Curtis Field opened just north of Brady in 1942 as a pilot-training school. Also during World War II, a German prisoner-of-war camp was built three miles east of the town; it housed more than 300 Germans, most of them members of Rommel's Afrika Korps.

Brady grew slowly from the 1920s through the 1950s, with population estimates reaching a peak of 6,800 in 1958. In 1959, the Gulf, Colorado and Santa Fe Railway abandoned the section of track between Brownwood and Brady, thereby reducing Brady's access to outside markets. The population fell to 5,338 by 1961, and subsequently stabilized. Brady Reservoir was completed in 1963 for flood control, municipal and industrial water needs, and recreation. The Atchison, Topeka and Santa Fe abandoned the track between Brady and Eden in 1972, leaving the town with only a branch track to connect it with the main line at Lometa, in Lampasas County.

Brady had 5,925 residents and 142 businesses in 1988. It was principally a farming and ranching community. Its industry included a mohair-combing plant and sand-mining operations. The Francis King Art Gallery and Museum houses works by King, a painter and sculptor, and a collection of restored antique cars. The stone courthouse, built in 1900, was renovated in 2009. A horse racetrack, G. Rollie White Downs, opened in 1989 and closed in 1990. Brady's population in 1990 was 5,946, but dropped to 5,528 in 2010.

== Education ==
Around 1,200 students in Brady and Melvin attend Brady Independent School District schools. Brady Elementary consists of kindergarten-grade 5 and the principal is Christy Finn. Brady Middle School consists of grades 6–8 and the principal is Shona Moore. Brady High School consists of grades 9–12 with Russell Baldwin as principal. Hector Martinez serves as superintendent.

Brady High School is a Texas Education Agency "Recognized" campus.

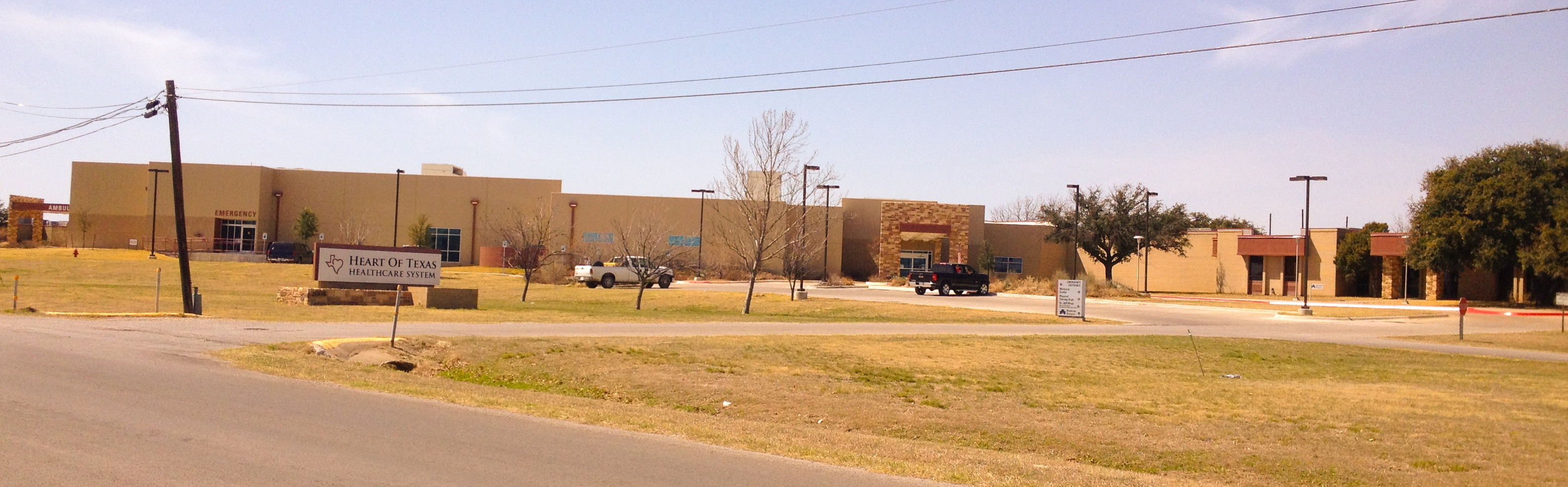
Heart of Texas Healthcare System is the primary hospital serving Brady.

== Government and infrastructure ==
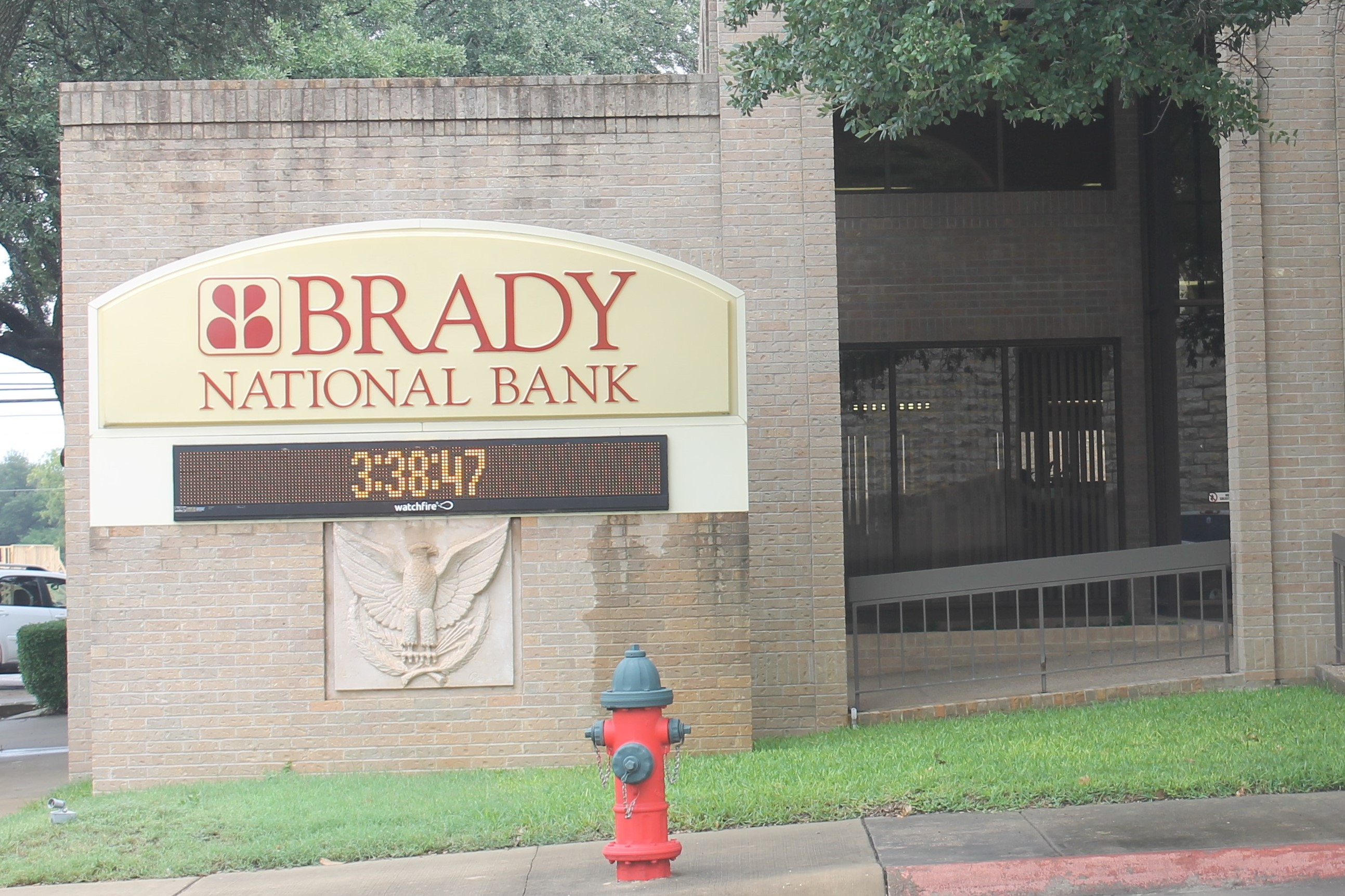
The Brady National Bank is located about the courthouse square.

In 1947, the state of Texas opened the Brady State School for Negro Girls on a former prisoner-of-war camp in McCulloch County, near Brady, leased from the federal government of the United States. In 1950, the state replaced the Brady facility with the Crockett State School.

Regarding drinking water for the community of Brady, changes are being made to reduce radionuclides.

== Notable people ==
- Scott Appleton, 1963 Outland Trophy winner, was an AFL and NFL player
- Rita Crocker Clements, was a Republican Party organizer and a First Lady of the U.S. state of Texas.
- Norma Jean, country music singer, was on The Porter Wagoner Show and the Grand Ole Opry in the 1960s
- Terry Manning, music producer, lived in Brady as a child
- James Earl Rudder teacher Brady High School and later president of Texas A&M University

== Gallery ==
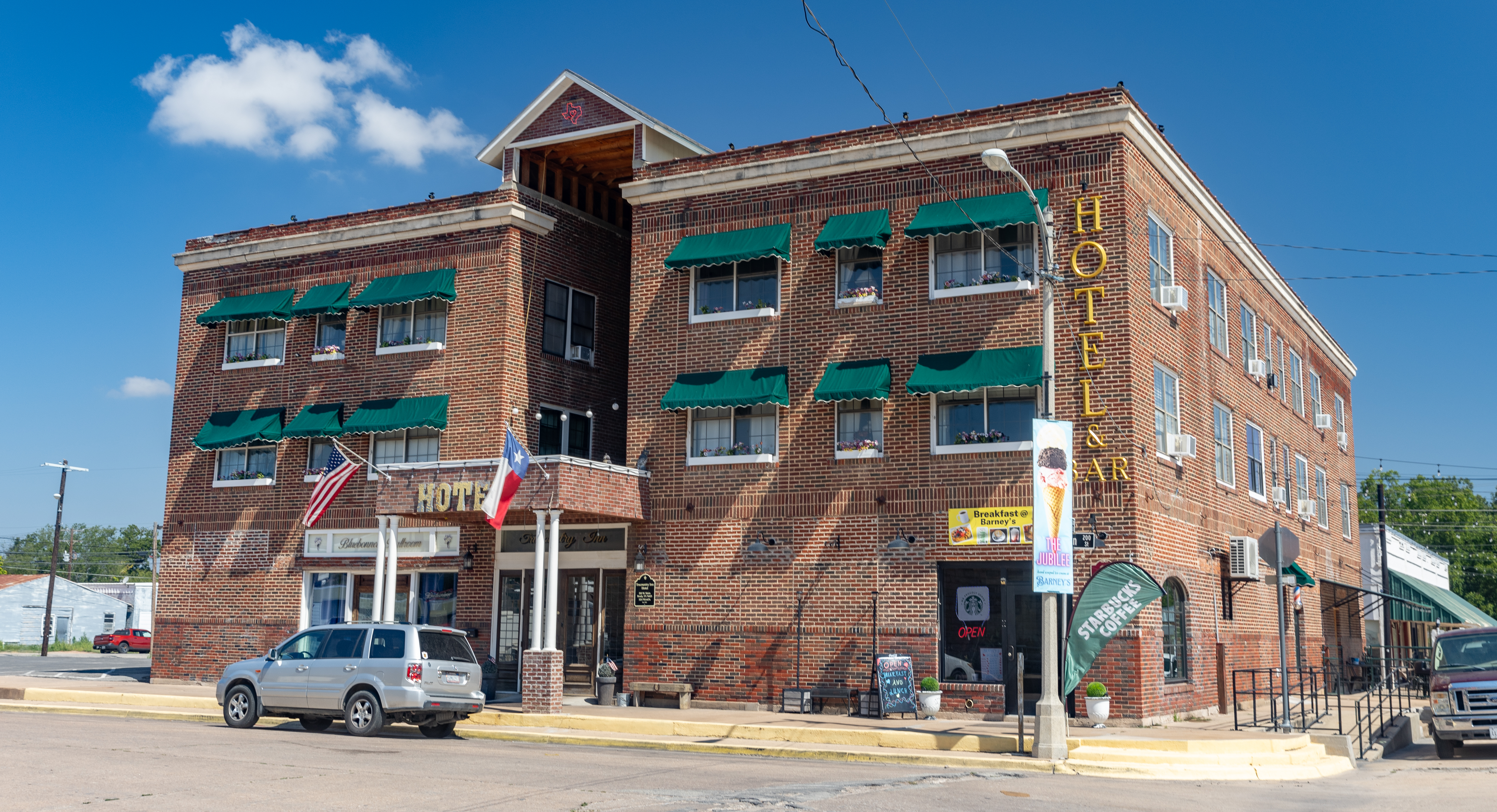
Trucountry Inn

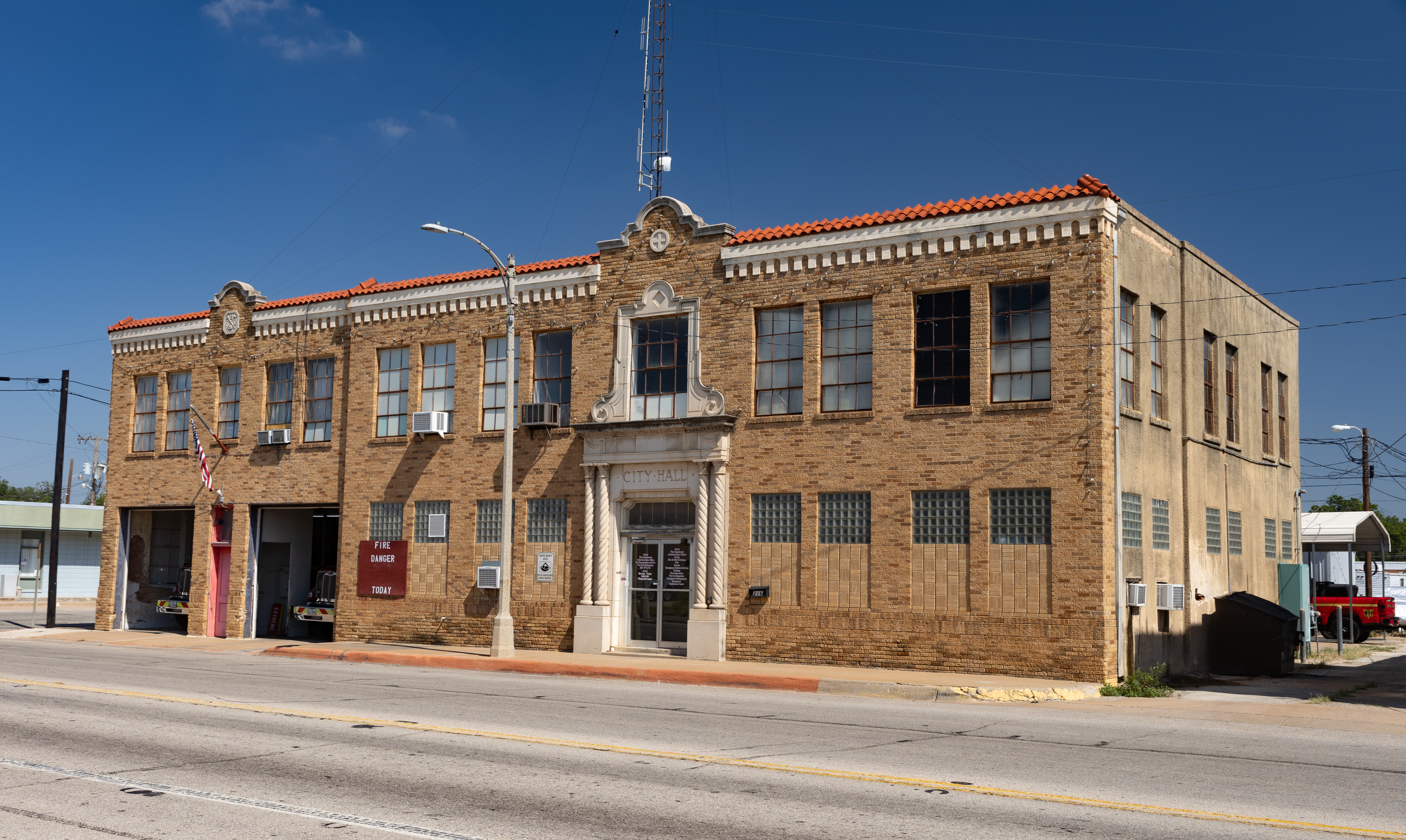
Fire Station

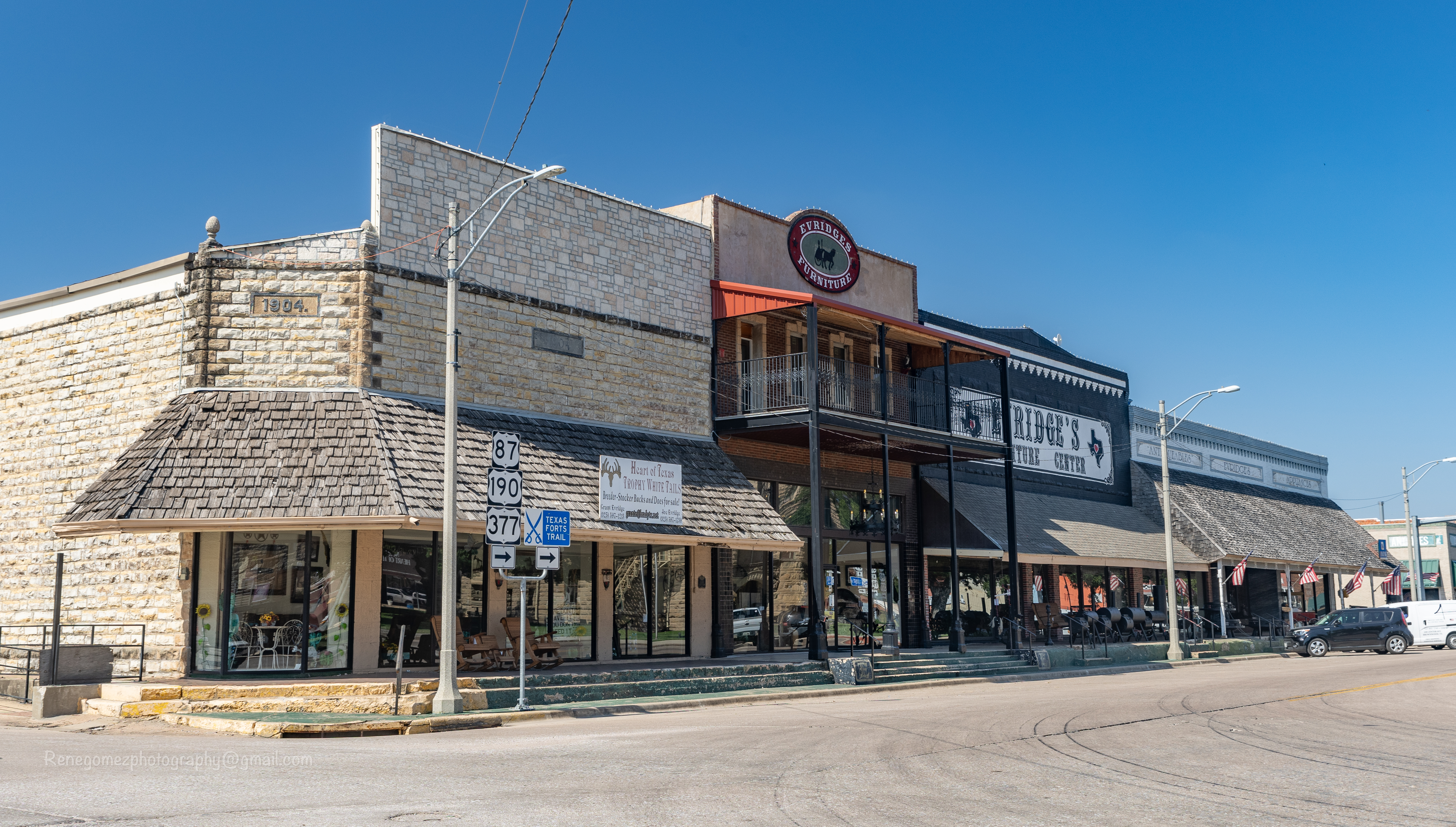
Downtown

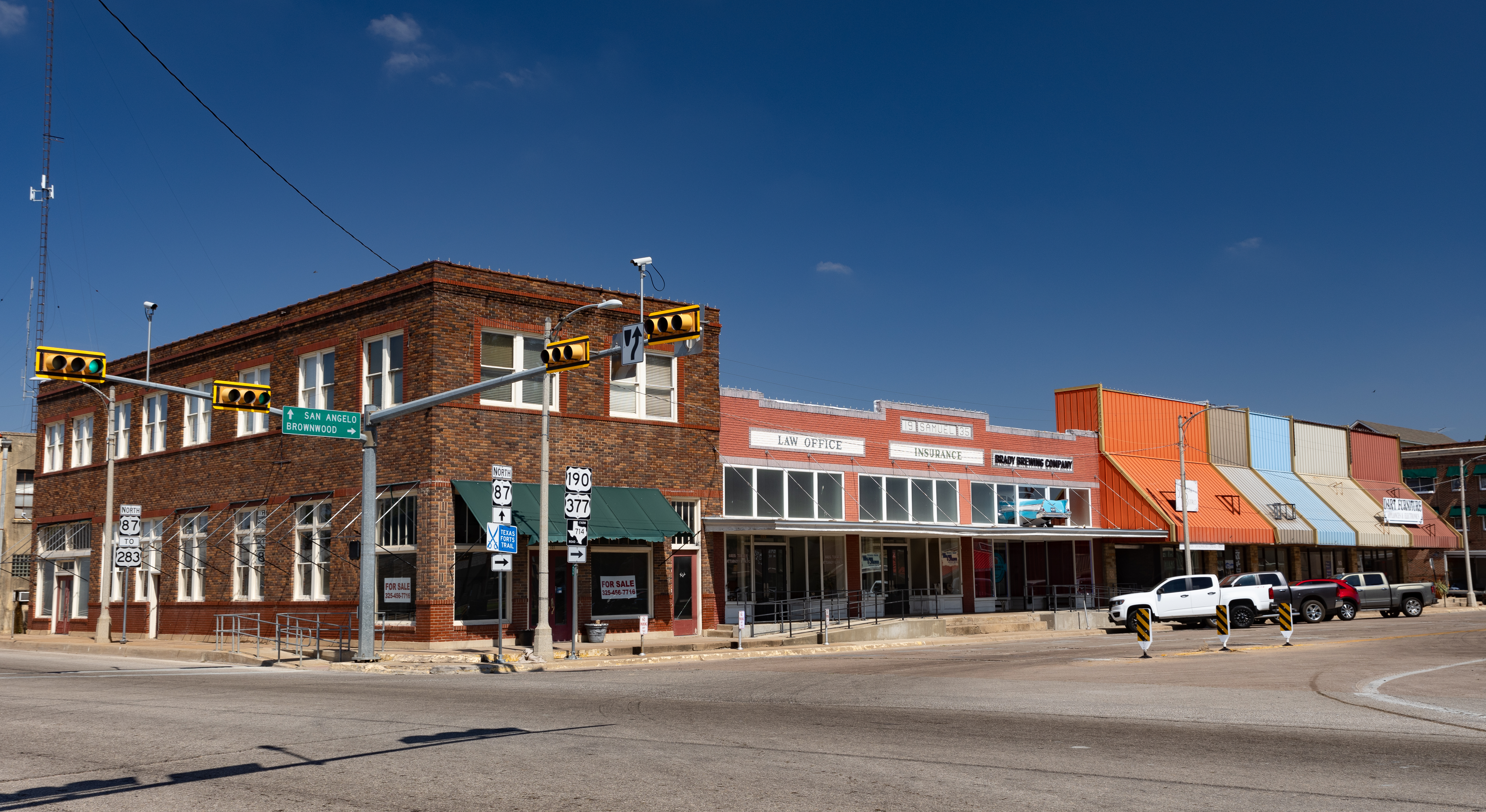
Downtown

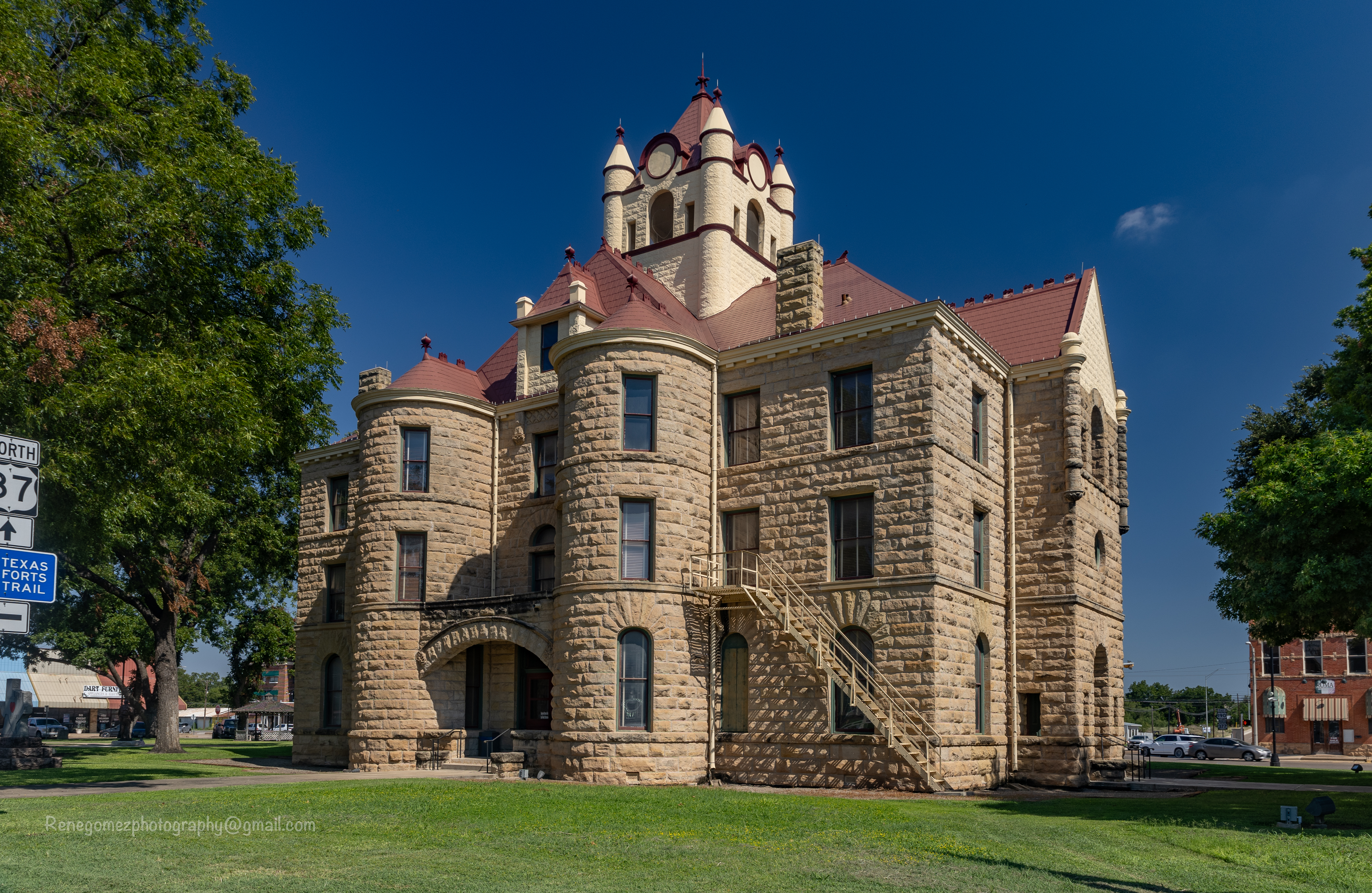
Courthouse

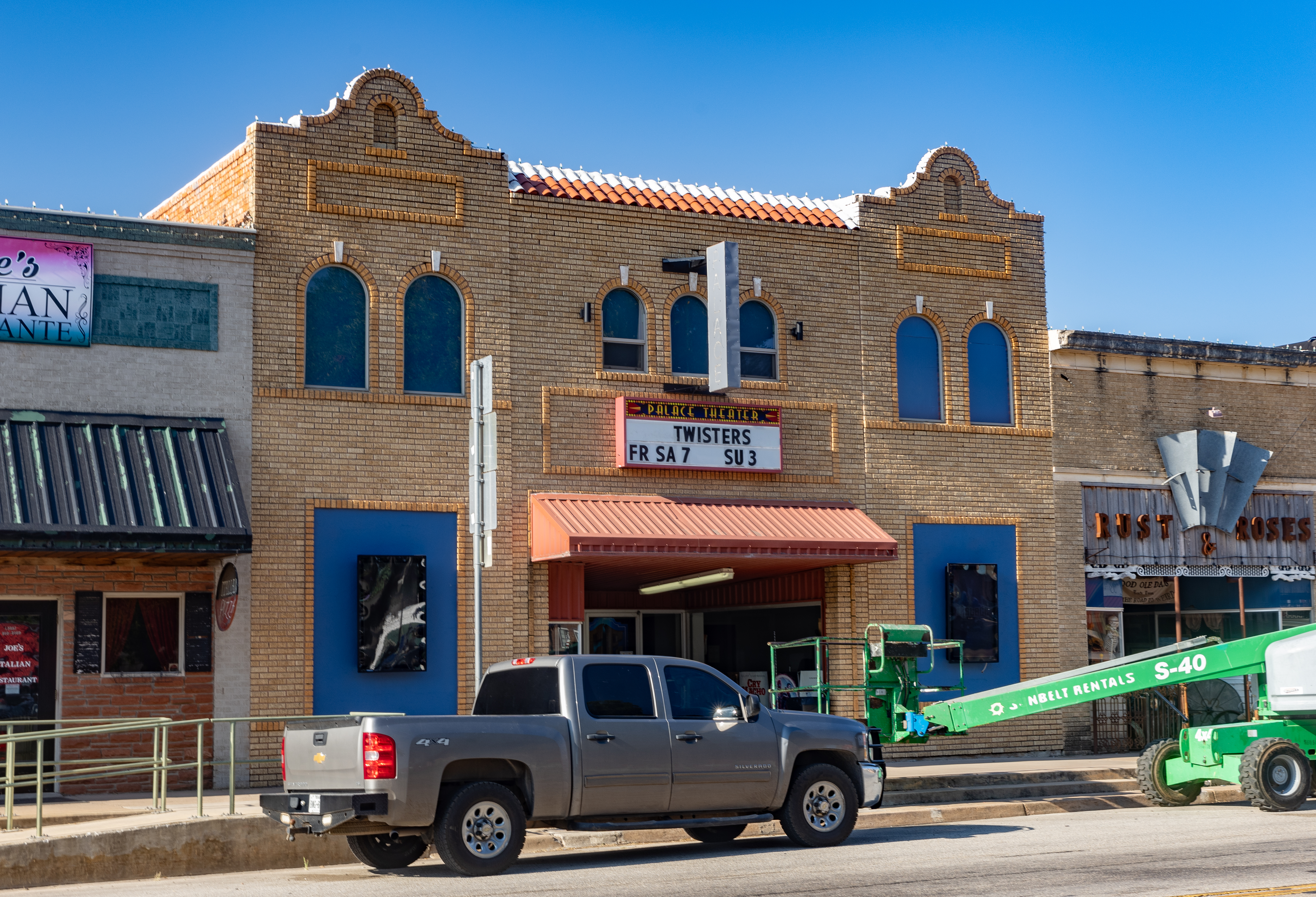
Palace Theater

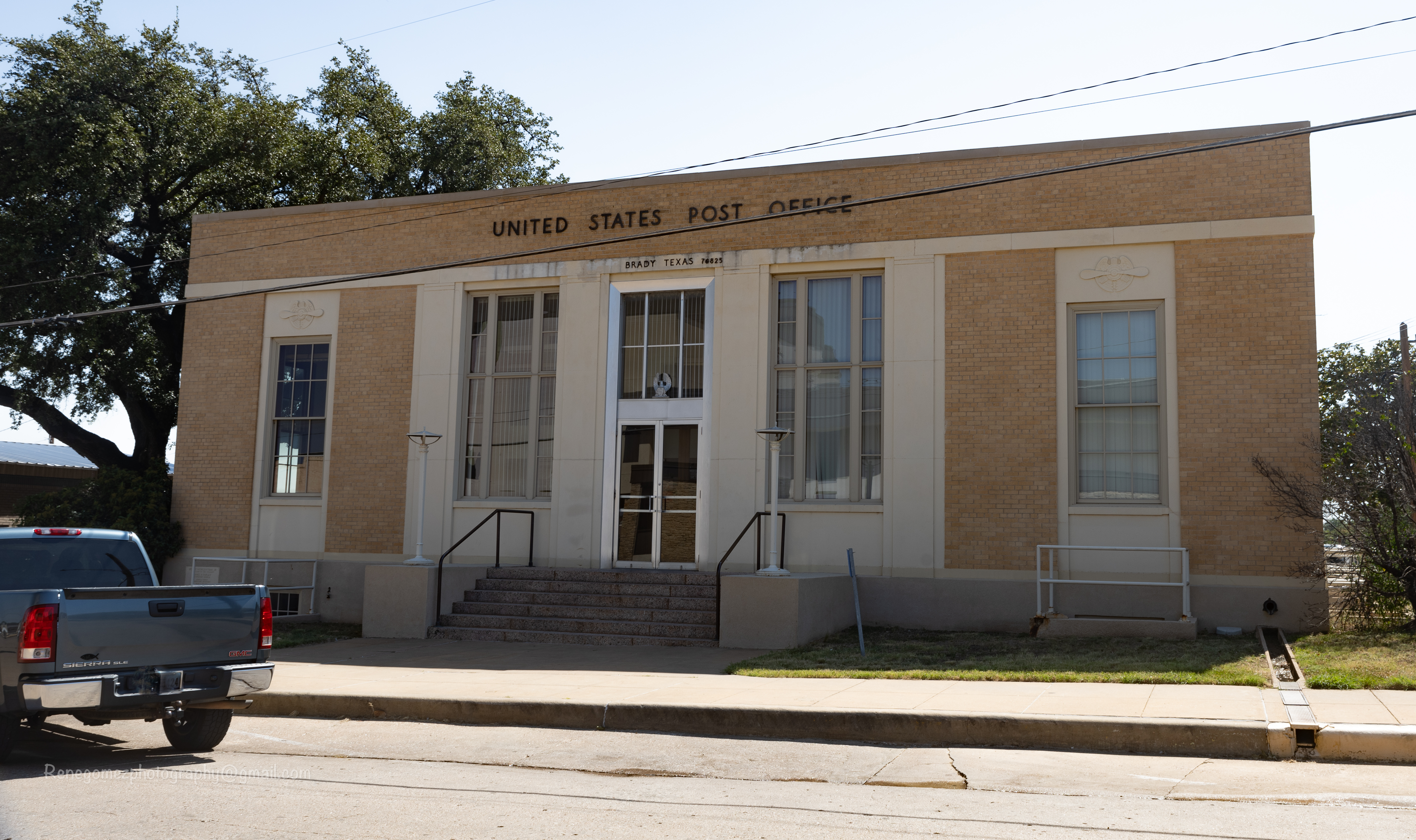
United States Post Office

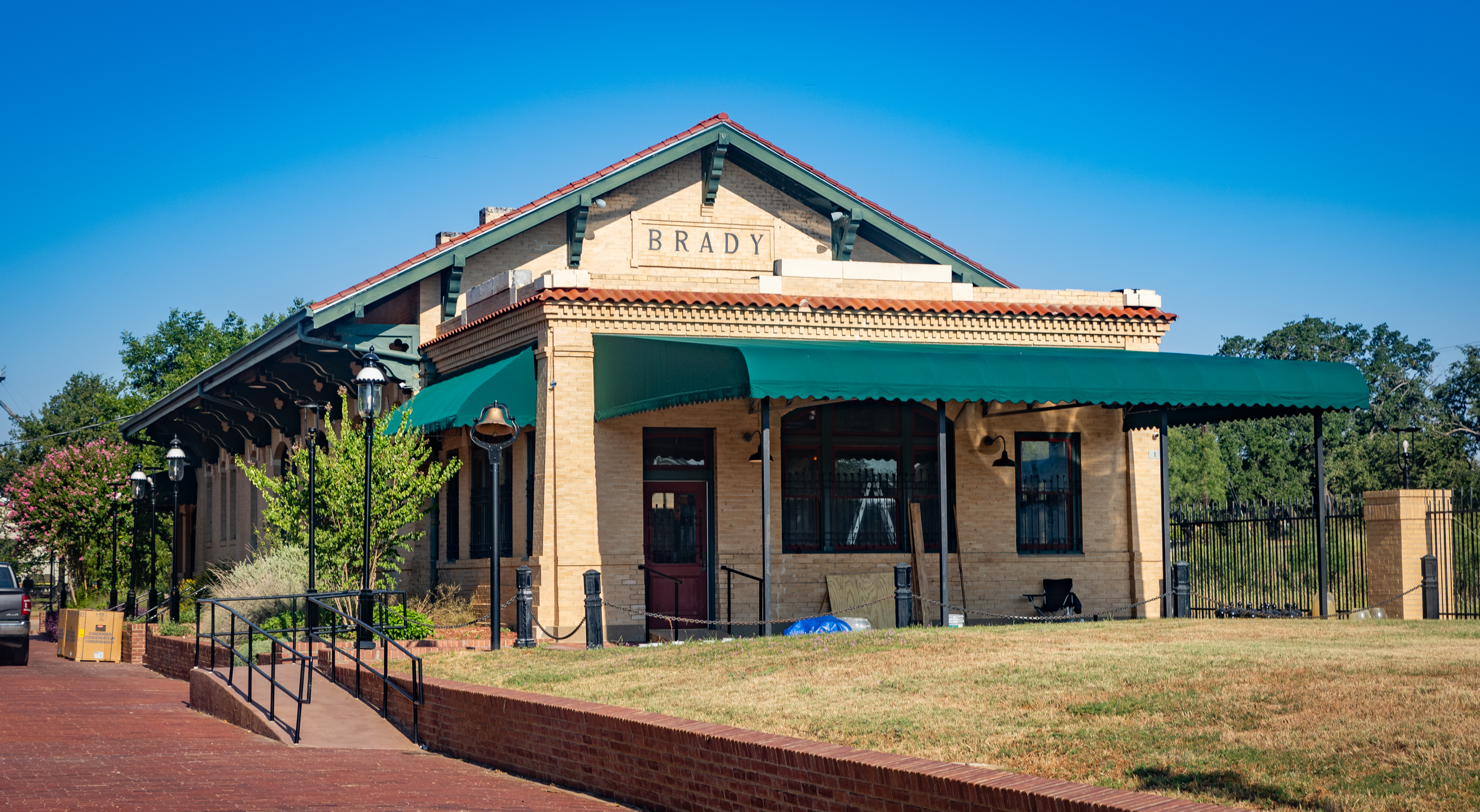
Train Depot

== See also ==
- McCulloch County Courthouse
- Old McCulloch County Jail
