= Brian Hall =

Brian Hall may refer to:

== Sports ==
=== Association football (soccer) ===
- Brian Hall (footballer, born 1939) (1939–2002), English footballer who played for Colchester United
- Brian Hall (footballer, born 1946) (1946–2015), Scottish footballer who played for Liverpool
- Brian Hall (referee) (born 1961), American soccer referee

=== Cricket ===
- Brian Hall (Yorkshire cricketer) (1929–1989), English cricketer with Yorkshire
- Brian Hall (Worcestershire cricketer) (born 1934), English cricketer with Worcestershire
- Brian Hall (Bermudian cricketer) (born 1992), Bermudian cricketer

=== Other sports ===
- Brian Hall (athlete) (1937–2010), English athlete
- Brian Hall (American football), American football player
- Brian Hall (Australian footballer) (born 1952), Australian rules footballer

== Others ==
- Brian Hall (actor) (1937–1997), English actor
- Brian Hall (author) (born 1959), American author
- Brian K. Hall (born 1941), Australian professor of biology
- Brian J. Hall, American clinical psychologist and global public health scholar
- Brian Hall, one of three mountain climbers lost December 2006, summarized at Mount Hood climbing accidents#Incident history

== See also ==
- Bryan Hall (disambiguation)
