= Hartley High School =

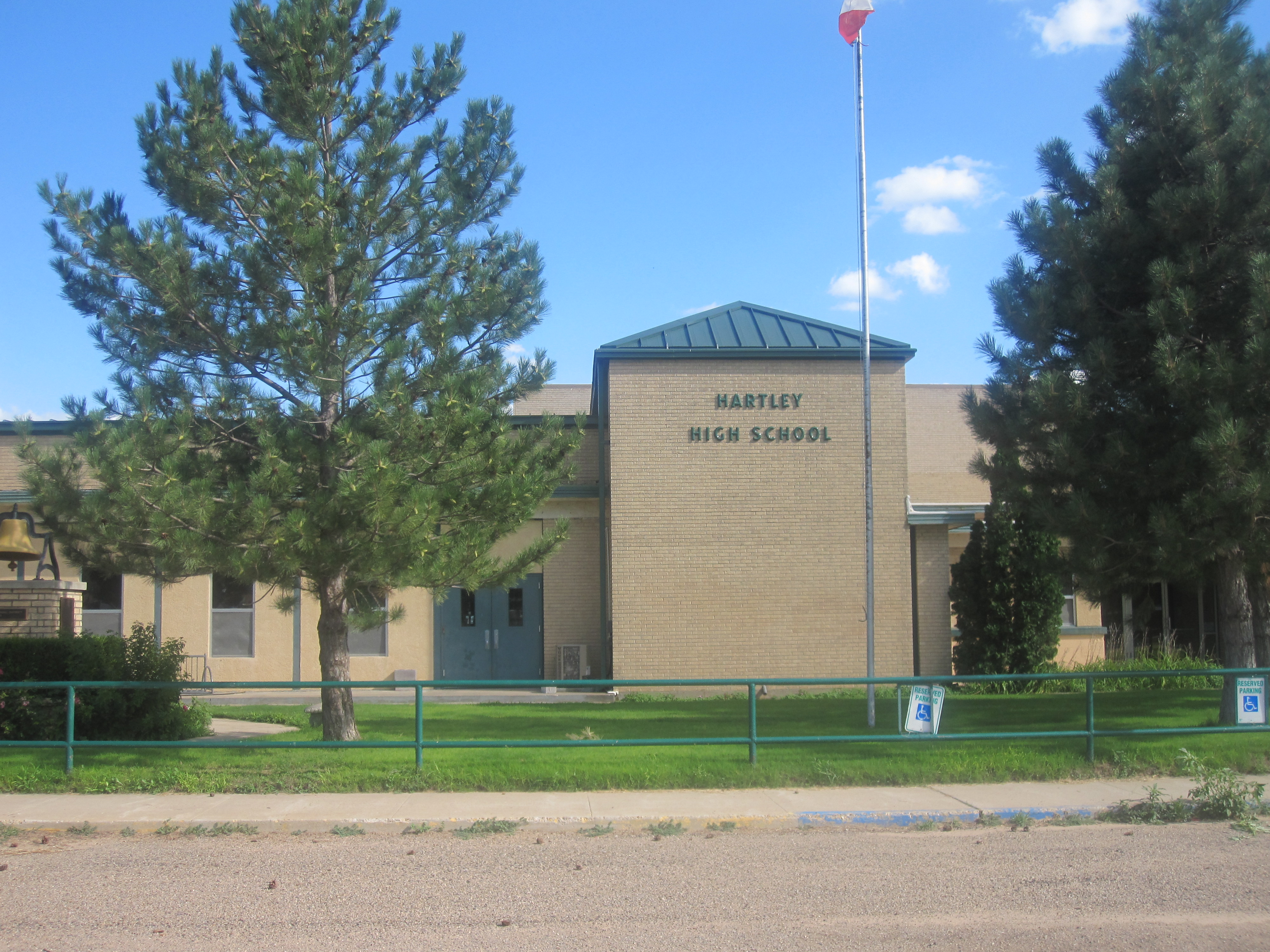

Location
- 905 Johnson Street; Hartley, Texas 79044-0408; United States; 35.880139°N 102.400971°W

Information
- School type: Public high school
- School district: Hartley Independent School District
- Principal: JaNan Grice
- Teaching staff: 20.38 (on an FTE basis)
- Grades: K–12
- Enrollment: 243 (2023–2024)
- Student to teacher ratio: 11.92
- Colors: Green & White
- Athletics conference: UIL Class A
- Mascot: Tiger
- Website: Hartley High School

Hartley High School or Hartley School is a public high school located in Hartley, Texas (USA) and is classified as a 1A school by the UIL. It is part of the Hartley Independent School District located in northeastern Hartley County. In 2015, the school was rated "Met Standard" by the Texas Education Agency.

== Athletics ==
The Hartley Tigers compete in these sports -

- Basketball
- Cross Country
- Golf
- Tennis
- Track and Field

=== State Titles ===
- Girls Cross Country
  - 2014(1A),
