= National Register of Historic Places listings in Hartley County, Texas =

Location of Hartley County in Texas

This is a list of the National Register of Historic Places listings in Hartley County, Texas.

This is intended to be a complete list of properties and districts listed on the National Register of Historic Places in Hartley County, Texas. There are four properties listed on the National Register in the county. Two of these hold Recorded Texas Historic Landmarks including one property that is a State Antiquities Landmark.

This National Park Service list is complete through NPS recent listings posted March 21, 2025.

== Current listings ==
The publicly disclosed locations of National Register properties may be seen in a mapping service provided.

| | Name on the Register | Image | Date listed | Location | City or town | Description |
|---|---|---|---|---|---|---|
| 1 | Hartley County Courthouse and Jail | Hartley County Courthouse and Jail | December 31, 1987 (#87002237) | Railroad Ave. 35°40′54″N 102°19′57″W | Channing | State Antiquities Landmark, Recorded Texas Historic Landmarks |
| 2 | Proctor Pen I | Proctor Pen I | July 12, 1984 (#84001852) | Address restricted | Amarillo | |
| 3 | Miguel Tafoya Place | Miguel Tafoya Place | July 12, 1984 (#84001854) | Address restricted | Amarillo | |
| 4 | XIT General Office | XIT General Office | May 6, 1985 (#85000960) | Railroad Ave. and 5th St. 35°41′09″N 102°19′52″W | Channing | Recorded Texas Historic Landmarks |

== See also ==
- National Register of Historic Places listings in Texas
- Recorded Texas Historic Landmarks in Hartley County
