= Brian Hall (American football) =

American football player

Profile
- Position: Placekicker

Personal information
- Born: 1953 or 1954 (age 71–72)

Career information
- High school: Dalhart (Dalhart, Texas)
- College: Texas Tech (1972–1976)

Brian Hall (born 1953 or 1954) is an American former college football player who was a placekicker for the Texas Tech Red Raiders. He kicked with a prosthetic leg: at the age of 14, his foot was amputated after an accident on his family's ranch. Hall joined his high school football team as a placekicker, and later walked-on at Texas Tech University to play college football. He set the school's all-time field goal record and led the country in field goal percentage his senior year.

== Early life ==
Brian Hall was born in 1953 or 1954, and grew up in Dalhart, Texas. On August 22, 1968, when he was 14, Hall was sitting on top of an irrigation sprinkler system at the family's ranch when he slipped and caught his foot in a sprocket. His foot was almost severed at the arch. Doctors decided to amputate the foot below the ankle. At the time of the accident, Hall had been a defensive guard on his junior high football team. In February 1969, Hall was fitted with his prosthetic leg. At Dalhart High School, he tried out as a placekicker so he could keep playing with his friends. Hall had to get special permission from the local Interscholastic League due to the league's rules banning casts. Hall stated "There were better kickers on our high school team than me. But the coaches were very understanding and let me do the kicking." He scored 57 points as a junior. However, he had a poor senior year with 29 points after the center and holder graduated.

== College career ==
The only college football program that showed interest in Hall was Nebraska, who Hall said sent him "a lot of letters". Hall also noted that "I think the only reason they did was because one of my parents' friends is a Nebraska graduate who told the coaches up there about me." Nebraska did not offer him an athletic scholarship, instead asking him to walk-on. Hall declined the offer from Nebraska.

In 1972, Hall instead asked for, and was granted permission, to walk-on for Texas Tech. Hall wanted to attend Texas Tech due to his education being financed by a Texas rehabilitation program. He did not tell the coaches about his prosthetic leg. After head coach Jim Carlen witnessed Hall missing kicks in practice, he told him to lock his ankle when he kicked, to which Hall replied that he did not have an ankle. He was on the freshman team in 1972, making one field goal and 14 extra points. After a mediocre freshman year, he bought a new prosthetic leg which improved his performance. Hall was a three-year varsity letterman from 1974 to 1976. He went on partial scholarship as a sophomore in 1974, and converted five of seven field goals and 22 of 24 extra points that season. He made eight of 11 field goals and 24 extra points his junior year in 1975, leading the team with 48 total points. On November 15, 1975, Hall kicked a Southwest Conference (SWC) record four field goals against Baylor. He was put on full scholarship his senior year in 1976 after the Texas rehabilitation program withdrew their financial aid. He led the team in points again as a senior, converting 16 of 21 field goals and 36 of 37 extra points. His 16 field goals were the most in school history, while his 36 extra points and 84 total points were both the most in the SWC that year. He also led the country with a 76.2 field goal percentage. Hall finished his college career with 28 field goals, the most in school history. At the conclusion of his senior year, he was awarded the Kern Tips Memorial Award, given to SWC football's top scholar-athlete. He majored in agricultural communication at Texas Tech.

In 1976, The Lincoln Star reported that Hall had received hundreds of letters from amputees and parents of amputeees. He appeared on the game show To Tell the Truth in 1977, winning $167 and some door prizes.

== Prosthetic leg ==
Hall's prosthetic leg for football weighed 8 pounds (3.6 kg) and fit under his uniform. Its foot was a piece of rubber encased in a square-toed football shoe, which was attached to a frame that went around Hall's real leg up to his knee. He had a different prosthetic leg for walking.
