= Dalhart Unit =

Prison in Texas, United States

- Location in Texas
- Location: 11950 FM 998 Dalhart, Texas 79022; 36.0230556°N 102.5591667°W
- Status: Operational
- Security class: G1, G2, G4
- Capacity: 1,040
- Opened: February 1995
- Managed by: TDCJ Correctional Institutions Division
- Warden: Billy Thompson
- Website: www.tdcj.state.tx.us/unit_directory../dh.html

The Dalhart Unit is a Texas Department of Criminal Justice prison for men located in unincorporated Hartley County, Texas. The unit is along Farm to Market Road 998 and near U.S. Highway 54, 4 miles (6.4 km) west and 1 mile (1.6 km) south of Dalhart. It is located next to Dalhart Municipal Airport. As of 2000 Dalhart serves minimum and medium security inmates.

== History ==
The unit opened in February 1995. The unit was named in memory of R.C. Johnson, a longtime sheriff of Dallam County, and Steve Booth, a Texas Department of Public Safety (DPS) trooper who was killed. In September 2007 62% of the prison's job positions were filled, making the Dalhart Unit among the most under-staffed units in the state. In October 2007 an entire wing of the prison was closed because there were too few officers to properly monitor the wing. Staffing is a constant problem, press reports indicated that in 2018, the facility was at 51% staffing.
