= Channing, Texas =

- City
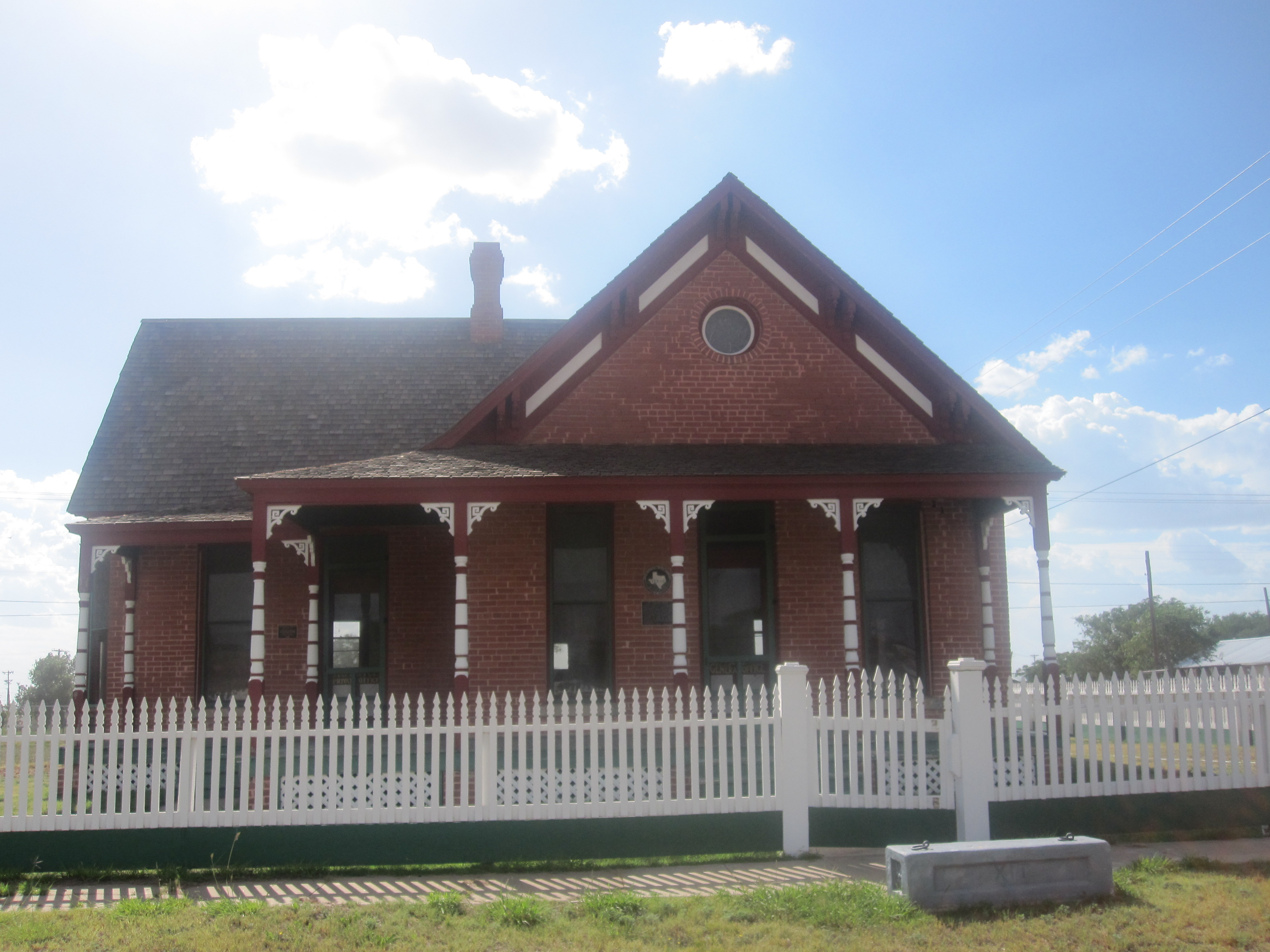
- XIT Ranch General Office in Channing

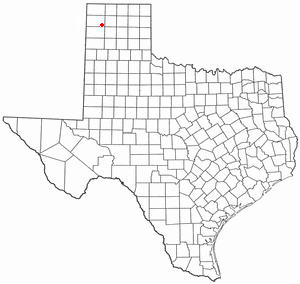
- Location of Channing, Texas

- Coordinates: 35°40′55″N 102°19′56″W
- Country: United States
- State: Texas
- County: Hartley

Area
  - Total: 0.99 sq mi (2.57 km^{2})
  - Land: 0.99 sq mi (2.57 km^{2})
  - Water: 0 sq mi (0.00 km^{2})
- Elevation: 3,803 ft (1,159 m)

Population (2020)
  - Total: 281
  - Density: 283/sq mi (109/km^{2})
- Time zone: UTC-6 (Central (CST))
  - Summer (DST): UTC-5 (CDT)
- ZIP code: 79018
- Area code: 806
- FIPS code: 48-14260
- GNIS feature ID: 2409436

Channing is a town in Hartley County, Texas, in the United States. It is the county seat of Hartley County. As of the 2020 United States census, the town's population was 281.

== History ==
Channing was founded in 1888 by George Channing Rivers, a paymaster for the Fort Worth and Denver City Railway. The settlement was originally called Rivers. Since the name Rivers duplicated another community in Texas, the name was changed to Channing later that year. Channing developed directly from its association with the XIT Ranch, a property that once included land in as many as 10 counties in the Texas Panhandle.

In 1891, Willis D. Twitchell platted Channing's business district. At that time, Channing was the headquarters of the XIT. Albert Boyce, the ranch's general manager and one of the most prominent early citizens, built the first house in the community. By 1900, Channing had two stores, a post office, lumber yard, and school.

Two elections, one in November 1896 and the other in 1903, were required for Channing to replace Hartley as county seat. The frame courthouse was pulled to Channing on wheels by mounted XIT cowboys in 1903. A brick courthouse was completed in 1906 and the original courthouse was converted into the once-famous Hotel Rivers. One of the first public libraries in the Panhandle was established in 1908 by a local women's club. The estimated population at this time was about 600.

The XIT, which conducted most of its business from Channing, was the town's chief customer until liquidation of the ranch in 1911. The local economy was severely impacted, although the real-estate market temporarily thrived from the sale of XIT lands. A fire swept through the business district on September 6, 1931, destroying seven buildings, including Hotel Rivers. By 1940, Channing had an estimated population of 475 with several businesses, a high school, and three churches. A restored XIT office building is located in Channing as a museum.

Channing was incorporated in 1960. At the time of incorporation, the population was 390. The number of inhabitants declined to 336 in 1970, 304 in 1980, and 277 in 1990, mainly because of its accessibility to the larger communities of Dalhart and Amarillo. By 2000, the population rose to 356, a 28.5% increase over the 1990 figure.

== Geography ==
Channing is situated at the junction of U.S. Highway 385, State Highway 354, and FM 767 in southeastern Hartley County, approximately 30 miles south of Dalhart. According to the United States Census Bureau, the city has a total area of 0.3 sq mi (2.6 km^{2}), all land.

=== Climate ===
According to the Köppen climate classification, Channing has a semiarid climate, BSk on climate maps.

== Demographics ==
Historical population
Census	Pop.	Note	%±
1960	351		—
1970	336		−4.3%
1980	304		−9.5%
1990	277		−8.9%
2000	356		28.5%
2010	363		2.0%
2020	281		−22.6%
U.S. Decennial Census

=== 2020 census ===
As of the 2020 census, there were 281 people, 114 households, and 91 families residing in the city. The median age was 38.4 years.

23.8% of residents were under the age of 18 and 16.0% were 65 years of age or older. For every 100 females there were 97.9 males, and for every 100 females age 18 and over there were 94.5 males age 18 and over.

0% of residents lived in urban areas, while 100.0% lived in rural areas.

There were 114 households in Channing, of which 38.6% had children under the age of 18 living in them. Of all households, 57.9% were married-couple households, 14.9% were households with a male householder and no spouse or partner present, and 21.1% were households with a female householder and no spouse or partner present. About 16.7% of all households were made up of individuals and 8.8% had someone living alone who was 65 years of age or older.

There were 130 housing units, of which 12.3% were vacant. Among occupied housing units, 65.8% were owner-occupied and 34.2% were renter-occupied. The homeowner vacancy rate was <0.1% and the rental vacancy rate was 9.3%.

Racial composition as of the 2020 census
Race	Percent
White	81.9%
Black or African American	1.1%
American Indian and Alaska Native	1.8%
Asian	0%
Native Hawaiian and Other Pacific Islander	0%
Some other race	4.3%
Two or more races	11.0%
Hispanic or Latino (of any race)	14.6%

=== 2000 census ===
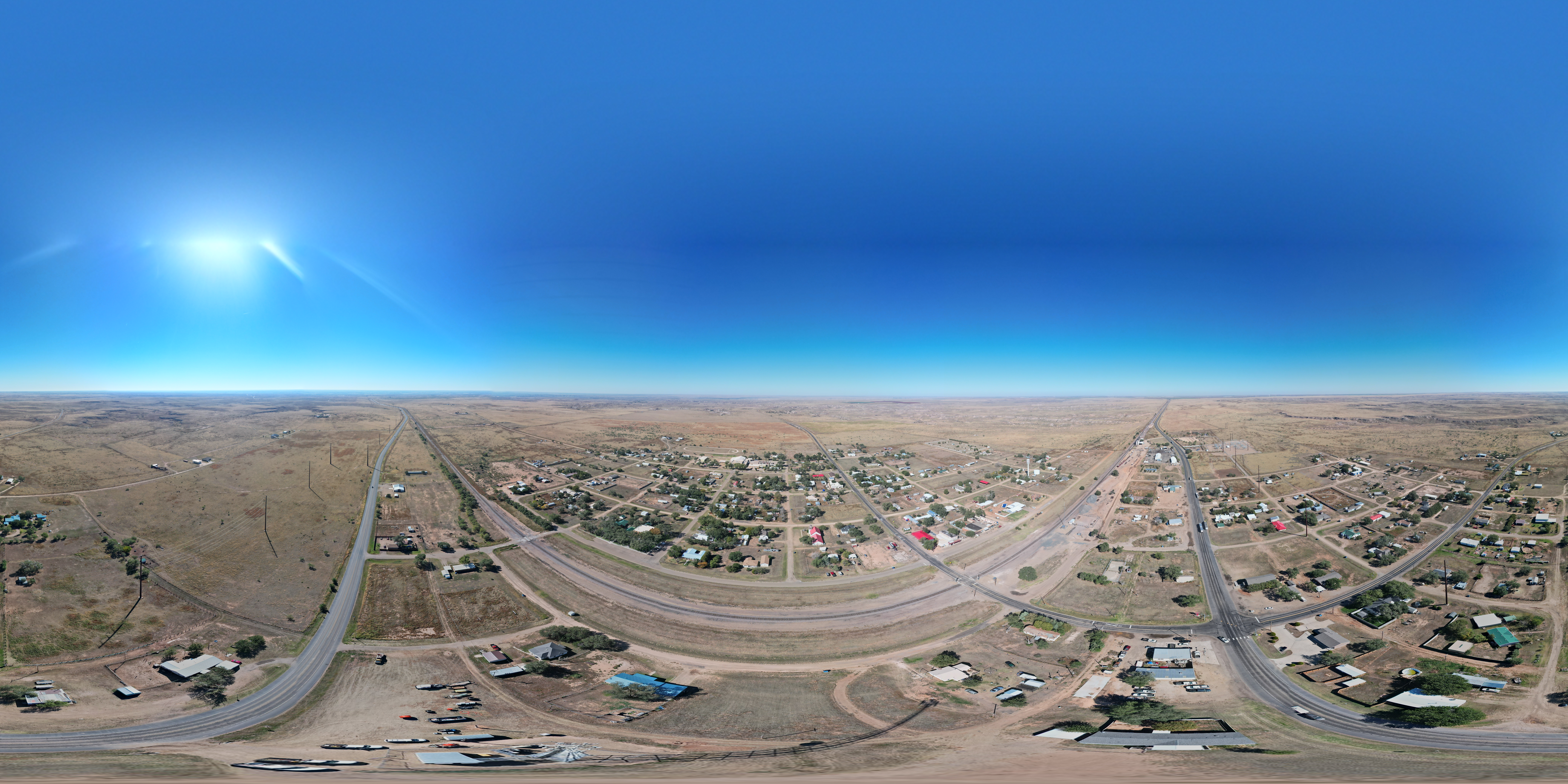
Channing

As of the census of 2000, 356 people, 135 households, and 103 families were living in the city. The population density was 357.9 people/sq mi (138.8/km^{2}). The 154 housing units had an average density of 154.8/sq mi (60.1/km^{2}). The racial makeup of the city was 94.94% White, 1.12% African American, 0.56% Native American, 1.69% from other races, and 1.69% from two or more races. Hispanics or Latinos of any race were 7.02% of the population.

Of the 135 households, 38.5% had children under 18 living with them, 74.1% were married couples living together, 2.2% had a female householder with no husband present, and 23.0% were not families. About 23.0% of all households were made up of individuals, and 11.9% had someone living alone who was 65 or older. The average household size was 2.63, and the average family size was 3.07.

In the city, the age distribution was 29.5% under 18, 4.8% from 18 to 24, 27.5% from 25 to 44, 22.8% from 45 to 64, and 15.4% who were 65 or older. The median age was 40 years. For every 100 females, there were 89.4 males. For every 100 females age 18 and over, there were 93.1 males.

The median income for a household in the city was $34,167, and for a family was $42,188. Males had a median income of $29,250 versus $22,679 for females. The per capita income for the city was $16,824. About 3.5% of families and 5.5% of the population were below the poverty line, including 5.6% of those under age 18 and 9.5% of those age 65 or over.

== Government ==
City government consists of a mayor and two city council members. Mayor Troy Williams was elected in May 2021. Current council members are Preston Mead and Kelly Garrison.

Law enforcement is provided by the Hartley County Sheriff's Office, as the city does not have a police force of its own. Fire protection for the city and much of southern Hartley County is provided by an all-volunteer fire department, headquartered in the city.

== Education ==
Channing is served by the Channing Independent School District. One building, Channing School, houses all grades.

== Notable people ==
- Walt Schlinkman, American football player, coach and scout
