= KDHT =

KDHT may refer to:

- KDHT (FM), a radio station (95.7 FM) licensed to serve Denver, Colorado, United States.
- KRCB-FM, a radio station (104.9 FM) licensed to serve Rohnert Park, California, United States, which held the call sign KDHT from 2017 to 2021
- KFCO, a radio station (107.1 FM) licensed to serve Bennett, Colorado, United States, which held the call sign KDHT-FM from 2009 to 2014
- KNMF, a radio station (93.3 FM) licensed to serve Cedar Park, Texas, United States, which held the call sign KDHT from 2003 to 2009
- The ICAO code for Dalhart Municipal Airport
- The NOAA code for Dalhart Municipal Airport weather station
