= Dalhart High School =

Location
- 2100 Spirit Trail; Dalhart, Texas 79022; United States; 36.0471°N 102.4993°W

Information
- School type: Public high school
- School district: Dalhart Independent School District
- Teaching staff: 38.48 (FTE)
- Grades: 9-12
- Enrollment: 471 (2023-2024)
- Student to teacher ratio: 12.24
- Colors: Purple and gold
- Athletics conference: UIL Class AAA
- Mascot: Golden Wolf
- Website: Dalhart High School website

Dalhart High School is a public high school located in Dalhart, Texas, United States; it is classified as a 3A school by the UIL. Serving more than 400 students in grades 9-12, Dalhart High School is part of the Dalhart Independent School District, which covers much of both Dallam and Hartley Counties. In 2015, the school was rated "met standard" by the Texas Education Agency.

== Athletics ==
The Dalhart Golden Wolves compete in these sports:

- Baseball
- Basketball
- Cross-country running
- Football
- Golf
- Powerlifting
- Softball
- Tennis
- Track and field
- Volleyball

On September 1, 2022, Dalhart sophomore Yahir Cancino was knocked unconscious while competing for the Golden Wolves' junior varsity football team in a game against Sundown that was played in Dimmitt. He was airlifted to University Medical Center in Lubbock, where he died from his injuries two days later.
