= Dalhart Independent School District =

School district in Texas

Dalhart Independent School District (DISD) is a school district based in Dalhart, Texas, United States.

DISD serves the city of Dalhart and unincorporated portions of Dallam County and Hartley County.

In 2009, the school district was rated "academically acceptable" by the Texas Education Agency.

== Schools ==
- Dalhart High School (grades 9-12)
- Dalhart Junior High School (grades 6-8)
- Dalhart Intermediate School (grades 3-5)
- Dalhart Elementary School (prekindergarten-grade 2)

== School upgrades ==
In a 2006 school bond election, Dalhart voters approved these changes to DISD schools:

- The high school was to move to a new school then being built.
- The junior high was to move to the high school.
- The middle school was to move to the junior high.
- The Allyn Finch Building was to become the district's headquarters.
- The elementary school was to receive improvements.
