= Channing Independent School District =

School district in Texas, United States

Coordinates: 35.6829°N 102.3367°W

Location
- Channing, TX ESC Region 16 USA

District information
- Type: Public
- Motto: Promoting excellence in student achievement
- Grades: K through 12
- Superintendent: Dr. Misty Heiskell

Students and staff
- Athletic conference: UIL Class 1A Div II
- Colors: red, black, and white

Other information
- Mascot: Eagles
- Website: Channing ISD

Channing School

Location
- 900 Greenwood Ave. Channing, Texas 79018-0107; United States

Information
- School type: Public K-12 school
- School district: Channing Independent School District
- Principal: Jamie Brigman
- Teaching staff: 19.36 (FTE)
- Grades: K-12
- Enrollment: 182 (2018–19)
- Student to teacher ratio: 9.40
- Colors: Red & Black
- Athletics conference: UIL Class A
- Mascot: Eagle
- Newspaper: The Eagle's Eye
- Yearbook: The Eagle
- Website: Channing High School

Channing Independent School District is a public school district based in Channing, Texas (USA). The district serves southern and western portions of Hartley County as well as northern Oldham County.

Channing ISD has one school, Channing School, that serves students in grades kindergarten through twelve. Classified as a 1A school by the UIL, it is located in southeastern Hartley County.

In 2009, the school district was rated "recognized" by the Texas Education Agency.

In 2015, the school was rated "Met Standard" by the Texas Education Agency.

== History ==
The district changed to a four day school week in fall 2022.

== Athletics ==
The Channing Eagles compete in these sports: Cross Country, Basketball, Golf, Tennis, Track.

=== State Titles ===
- One Act Play State Championships in 1978(B), 1979(B), 2006(1A)
