= Bryan Hall =

Bryan Hall may refer to:

- Bryan Hall (sportscaster) (born 1934), Canadian radio presenter
- Bryan Hall (gridiron football) (born 1988), American football linebacker
- Bryan Hall (Gainesville, Florida), a historic building in Gainesville, Florida, United States
- Bryan Hall (Washington State University), a historic building in Pullman, Washington, United States

== See also ==
- Brian Hall (disambiguation)
