= Brian Hall (Worcestershire cricketer) =

English cricketer

Personal information
- Full name: Brian Charles Hall
- Born: 2 March 1934 (age 92); Marylebone, London, England
- Batting: Right-handed
- Bowling: Right-arm medium

Domestic team information
- Years: Team
- 1956–1957: Worcestershire

Career statistics
Competition	FC
Matches	3
Runs scored	34
Batting average	11.33
100s/50s	0/0
Top score	21
Balls bowled	228
Wickets	3
Bowling average	32.33
5 wickets in innings	0
10 wickets in match	0
Best bowling	2/11
Catches/stumpings	1/0
- Source: CricketArchive, 23 November 2008

Brian Charles Hall (born 2 March 1934) is a former English cricketer who played first-class cricket for Worcestershire, making a total of three appearances (none of them in the County Championship) in 1956 and 1957.

Hall played a few times for Middlesex's Second XI in 1954 and 1955, but he never made a first-class appearance for the county. His debut came at the end of June 1956 when Worcestershire played Oxford University; he took all three of his first-class wickets in this game, dismissing Jimmy Allan twice, and made his highest score of 21 in the first innings.

In the two matches he played in 1957 – against Oxford University once again and Combined Services – he took no wickets and scored one run. Hall never played first-class cricket again.

Hall went on to take over 1720 wickets for Stanmore Cricket Club and captained the club 1966–1970.
