= Dalhart Municipal Airport =

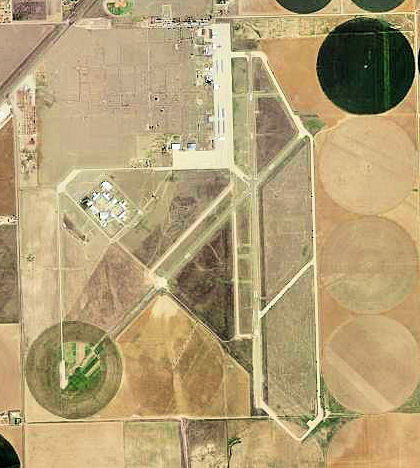
- 1996 USGS Photo
- IATA: DHT; ICAO: KDHT; FAA LID: DHT

Summary
- Airport type: Public
- Owner: City of Dalhart
- Location: Hartley County, near Dalhart, Texas
- Elevation AMSL: 3,991 ft (1,216 m)
- Coordinates: 36°01′21″N 102°32′50″W

Map
- Location within Texas

Runways
Direction	Length		Surface
Direction	ft	m	Surface
3/21	5,440	1,658	Asphalt
17/35	6,400	1,951	Asphalt

Statistics (2021)
- Aircraft operations (year ending 9/16/2021): 7,650
- Based aircraft: 40
- Source: Federal Aviation Administration

Dalhart Municipal Airport (IATA: DHT, ICAO: KDHT, FAA LID: DHT) is in unincorporated Hartley County, Texas, three miles (5 km) southwest of Dalhart, Texas, a city straddling the border of Dallam and Hartley counties in the northwest corner of the Texas Panhandle.

The airport sees no airlines.

== Facilities ==
The airport covers 1,206 acres (488 ha) and has two asphalt runways: 3/21 is 5,440 x 75 ft (1,658 x 23 m) and 17/35 is 6,400 x 75 ft (1,951 x 23 m).

In the year ending September 16, 2021, the airport had 7,650 aircraft operations, average 21 per day: 65% local general aviation, 33% transient general aviation, and 2% military. 40 aircraft were based at this airport: 33 single-engine, 5 multi-engine, 1 helicopter, and 1 glider.

== History ==
The airport was built by the Army and opened in May 1942 as Dalhart Army Airfield. Initially assigned to Army Air Forces Glider command, while under construction the command's temporary headquarters operated from a tent city in Amarillo.

Dalhart AAF closed in December 1945; the property went to the city. Several remaining buildings have been used as the Dalhart municipal airport.

== See also ==
- List of airports in Texas
