= Hartley Independent School District =

School district in Texas

Hartley High School
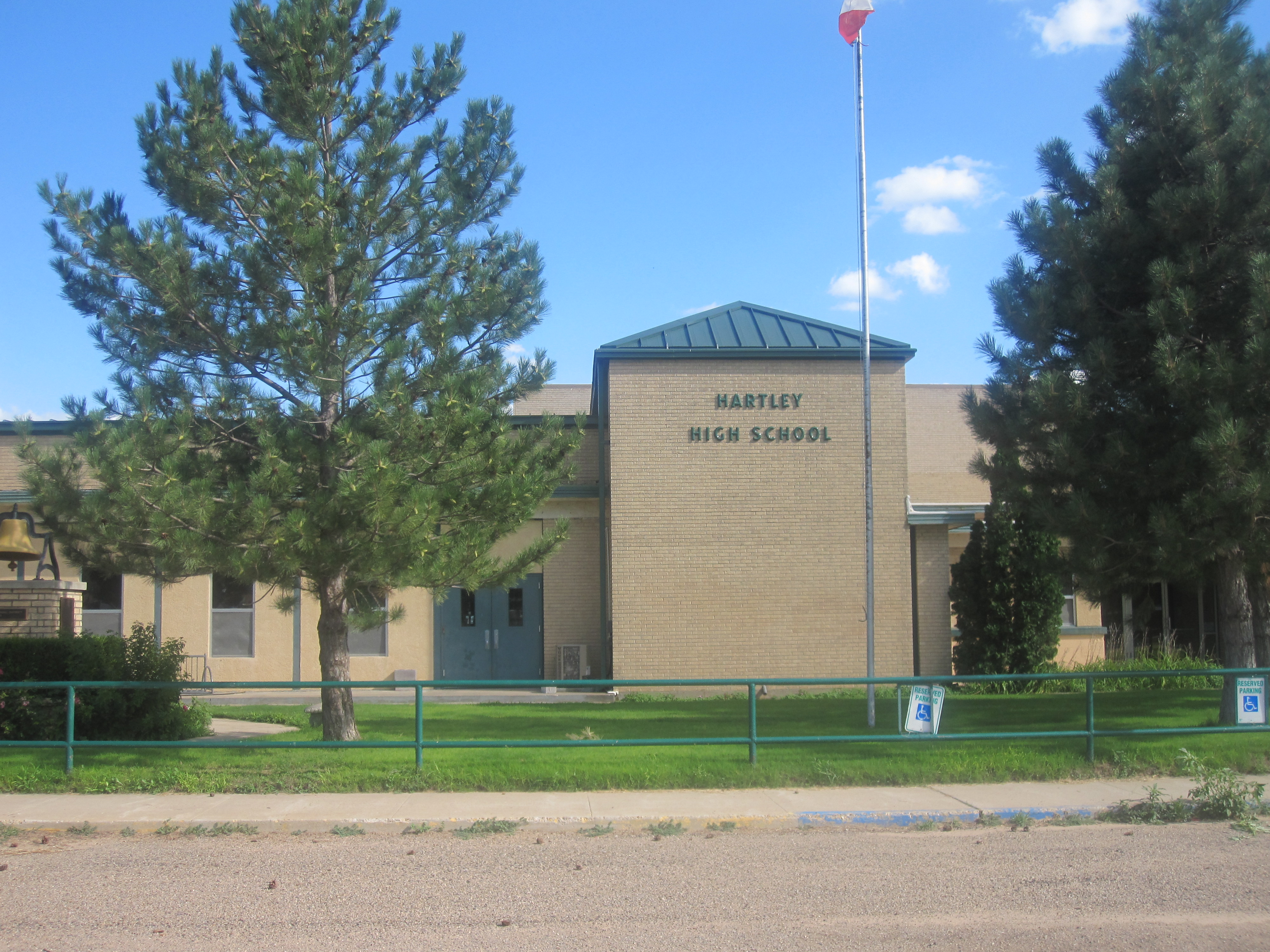

Location
- 9th and Johnson; Hartley, Texas 79044; United States

Information
- School type: Public high school
- School district: Hartley Independent School District
- Superintendent: Scott Vincent
- Grades: Prekindergarten–grade 12
- Enrollment: 214 (2013-14)
- Colors: Green and white
- Athletics conference: UIL Class A
- Mascot: Tigers
- Website: Hartley High School website

Hartley Independent School District is a public school district based in the community of Hartley, Texas, United States.

The district has one school that serves students from prekindergarten through grade 12.

In 2009, the school district was rated "academically acceptable" by the Texas Education Agency.
