= Brian Hall (Yorkshire cricketer) =

English cricketer

Personal information
- Born: 16 September 1929; Morley, Yorkshire, England
- Died: 27 February 1989 (aged 59); Doncaster, Yorkshire, England
- Batting: Right-handed
- Bowling: Right-arm medium-fast

Domestic team information
- Years: Team
- 1956–1957: Yorkshire

Career statistics
Competition	FC
Matches	1
Runs scored	14
Batting average	7.00
100s/50s	–/–
Top score	10
Balls bowled	66
Wickets	1
Bowling average	55.00
5 wickets in innings	–
10 wickets in match	–
Best bowling	1/55
Catches/stumpings	1/–
- Source: CricketArchive, 23 November 2008

Brian Hall (16 September 1929 – 27 February 1989) was an English first-class cricketer, who played a single first-class match for Yorkshire, against the Marylebone Cricket Club (MCC) at Lord's, in the early part of the 1952 season. A right arm medium fast bowler, he opened the bowling and took the single wicket of Maurice Tremlett. Batting at number 11 he scored 4 and 10, as Yorkshire collapsed to an innings defeat. He also caught Freddie Brown off the bowling of Brian Close.

Hall also played for the Yorkshire Second XI from 1952 to 1956.

Born in Morley, Yorkshire, he died in February 1989 in Doncaster, Yorkshire.
