= Brian J. Hall =

American clinical psychologist and global public health scholar

Brian James Hall
- Born: United States
- Education: Kent State University (Ph.D.)
- Known for: Global mental health equity; migrant and refugee mental health; trauma and PTSD; digital mental health
- Awards: Highly Cited Researcher, Clarivate (2022–2025); APA Distinguished Contributions to Psychology in the Public Interest (2021)
- Scientific career
- Fields: Clinical psychology, Global mental health, Psychiatric epidemiology
- Workplaces: NYU Shanghai; New York University; Johns Hopkins Bloomberg School of Public Health
- Doctoral advisor: Stevan E. Hobfoll
- Website: cghe.shanghai.nyu.edu

Brian James Hall (born in the United States) is an American clinical psychologist and global public health scholar. He is Professor of Global Public Health (with tenure) at NYU Shanghai and founding director of the NYU Shanghai Center for Global Health Equity. He is also an Affiliated Full Professor in the Department of Global and Environmental Health at the NYU School of Global Public Health in New York City..

Hall has been recognized as a Highly Cited Researcher by Clarivate each year from 2022 to 2025, placing him among the top 1% of scientists globally by citations in his fields. He is one of 28 full-time scientists across all of New York University to hold this distinction. His research addresses mental health among marginalized populations — including migrants, refugees, and disaster survivors — with a particular focus on low- and middle-income countries in the Asia-Pacific region.

== Education and training ==
Hall received his Doctor of Philosophy in Clinical Psychology from Kent State University in 2011.

Following his doctorate, he completed a predoctoral clinical internship at the Medical University of South Carolina (Charleston Consortium), where he was also an NIMH Predoctoral Research Fellow in Traumatic Stress (T32 MH018869). He then completed a Postdoctoral Research Fellowship in Psychiatric Epidemiology at the Johns Hopkins Bloomberg School of Public Health (NIMH T32 MH014592), followed by a Fogarty Global Health Fellowship at the National Institutes of Health / University of North Carolina in collaboration with Sun Yat-sen University School of Public Health, with country placement in Guangzhou, China (2013–2014).

== Academic positions ==
=== Current ===
Hall has held the rank of Professor of Global Public Health with tenure at NYU Shanghai since 2020, where he founded the Center for Global Health Equity. Since 2020 he has concurrently served as an Affiliated Full Professor at the NYU School of Global Public Health in New York. He holds adjunct appointments at Shanghai Jiao Tong University School of Medicine / Shanghai Mental Health Center (2025–present), Sun Yat-sen University School of Public Health (2024–present), School of Psychology at East China Normal University (2020–present), and the Centre for Macau Studies at the University of Macau (2018–present). He has been an Associate Faculty Member in Health, Behavior and Society at the Johns Hopkins Bloomberg School of Public Health since 2014.

=== Previous ===
Prior to joining NYU Shanghai, Hall served as Associate Professor (2018–2020) and Assistant Professor (2014–2018) of Psychology at the University of Macau, where he founded the Global and Community Mental Health Research Group. In 2017–2018 he was the inaugural Global Mental Health Fellow in the Department of Mental Health and Substance Abuse at the World Health Organization in Geneva. He was a Visiting associate professor at Johns Hopkins Bloomberg School of Public Health in 2019. Earlier in his career he worked as a statistician and clinician at Rush University Medical Center in Chicago (2008–2010).

== Research ==
Hall's research sits at the intersection of clinical psychology, psychiatric epidemiology, and global public health. His primary areas of investigation include:

- Migrant and refugee mental health: prevalence studies, determinants, and community-based interventions in Asia-Pacific contexts
- Traumatic stress and PTSD: cross-cultural measurement, epidemiology, and scalable psychological treatments
- Digital mental health and global health equity: technology-based approaches to closing the treatment gap and reducing mental health disparities in low- and middle-income countries, particularly in China and the Western Pacific
- Culture and mental health: cross-cultural conceptualization and classification of mental disorders, including contributions to the cultural revision of the DSM-5-TR (American Psychiatric Association, 2019–2021) and membership on the World Health Organization Working Group on Cultural Influences on Mental Health for the ICD-11 (2017–2018)

He is a Commissioner on The Lancet Commission on Mental Health in China (2020–present).

== Awards and honors ==
=== International recognition ===
Hall has been named a Highly Cited Researcher by Clarivate annually from 2022 to 2025, recognizing scientists whose publications rank in the top 1% by citations for field and year in the Web of Science. He is one of only 28 full-time scientists across all of New York University to receive this recognition.

- Delta Omega Honorary Society in Public Health, Delta Beta Chapter, 2022

=== American Psychological Association ===
In 2021 Hall received the American Psychological Association's Award for Distinguished Contributions to Psychology in the Public Interest. He was elected Fellow of the APA in 2019, with fellowship in Division 52 (International Psychology) and Division 12 (Society of Clinical Psychology). Earlier career awards from the APA include:

- Theodore Blau Early Career Award for Distinguished Professional Contributions to Clinical Psychology, Division 12, 2016
- Early Career Psychologist Award, Division 52 (International Psychology), 2016
- Award for Outstanding Contribution to Trauma Psychology by an Early Career Psychologist, Division 56 (Trauma Psychology), 2016
- Distinguished Student Award, Division 12 (Society of Clinical Psychology), 2007

=== Society and conference awards ===
- Early Career Award, Stress and Anxiety Research Society (STAR), 2017
- Student Development Award, Stress and Anxiety Research Society (STAR), 2007
- Chaim and Bela Danieli Young Professional Award, International Society for Traumatic Stress Studies (ISTSS), 2016
- Young Investigator Award — Applied Science, International Union of Psychological Science (IUPSyS), 2016
- Best Oral Presentation, World Psychiatric Association Conference, Hong Kong, 2014
- Excellent Paper Submission Prize (two conference abstracts), ISTSS Annual Meeting, Hangzhou, 2014
- Emerging Scholar Award (research), Faculty of Social Sciences, University of Macau, 2017

=== Academic honors ===
- Faculty Excellence in Advising Award, Center for Global Health, Johns Hopkins Bloomberg School of Public Health, 2019
- Keynote Distinguished Alumni Lecture, 50th Anniversary, Department of Psychological Sciences, Kent State University, 2018
- Full tuition scholarship, CBT for Depression and Anxiety Workshop, Beck Institute for Cognitive Behavior Therapy, Philadelphia, 2012
- Psi Chi International Honor Society in Psychology, 2001
- Golden Key International Honor Society, 2001

== Editorial service ==
Hall serves as Editor-in-Chief of Epidemiology and Psychiatric Sciences (Impact Factor 8.10, Q1) since 2025, having previously served as Senior Associate Editor (2023–2025). He is Advisory Editor of Social Science & Medicine (2024–present) and Associate Editor (Global Mental Health) of the International Journal of Mental Health (2020–present). He has served on the editorial boards of Social Psychiatry and Psychiatric Epidemiology, The European Journal of Psychotraumatology, Psychological Trauma: Theory, Research, Practice, and Policy, and Journal of Anxiety Disorders, among others.

He has guest-edited special issues for BMC Global Health Research and Policy, Frontiers in Psychiatry, Frontiers in Psychology, Applied Psychology: Health and Well-being, the International Journal of Environmental Research and Public Health, and The European Journal of Psychotraumatology.

== Advisory and policy roles ==
=== World Health Organization ===
- Technical Adviser for Digital Mental Health, Western Pacific Region (2021–present)
- Temporary Adviser, Expert Consultation on the Future of Mental Health in the Western Pacific Region (2021, 2022)
- External Expert Steering Committee Member, WHO Scientific Brief on COVID-19 and Mental Health (2021–2022)
- Member, Guidance Development Group, WHO interim guidance on rehabilitation of post-COVID-19 condition (2021–2022)
- Member, Working Group on Cultural Influences on Mental Health, ICD-11 (2017–2018)
- Member, Technical Expert Advisory Group, WHO "Problem Management Plus" (PM+) scalable psychological intervention (2016)

=== Other advisory roles ===
- Co-chair, Association of Pacific Rim Universities (APRU) Working Group on Migrant Health (2019–present)
- Co-chair, APRU Working Group on Mental Health (2019–present)
- Commissioner, The Lancet Commission on Mental Health in China (2020–present)
- Cross-Cutting Reviser and Reviewer, culture-related text, DSM-5-TR, American Psychiatric Association (2019–2021)
- Member, Programme Committee, World Health Summit Regional Meeting 2027, Hong Kong
- Board Advisor (Global Mental Health), Arelyx (2025–present)
- International Advisory Board Member, IINARA Center, Pontificia Universidad Católica de Chile (2026–present)

== Professional society leadership ==
Hall is an Elected Steering Committee Member of the Migration Health and Development Research Initiative (MHADRI), where he chairs the Sub-committee on Collaborations and Partnerships (2024–present). He co-chaired the APRU Working Groups on Migrant Health and on Mental Health. He served as an Elected Member of the Board of Directors of the International Society for Traumatic Stress Studies (2016–2019) and co-chaired its Research Methods Special Interest Group (2011–2019). He chairs the Fellows Committee of APA Division 12: Society of Clinical Psychology (2024–present).

== Licensure ==
Hall is a Licensed Clinical Psychologist in the state of Maryland (License #05193), active since 2013, along with Virgina, Washington DC, with Telehealth License in Florida and Colorado.
