= Brian Hall (Australian footballer) =

Australian rules footballer

Personal information
- Full name: Brian Hall
- Born: 1 May 1952 (age 74)
- Original team: Jacana
- Height: 183 cm (6 ft 0 in)
- Weight: 72 kg (159 lb)

Playing career^{1}
Years	Club	Games (Goals)
1971–72	North Melbourne	11 (0)
- ^{1} Playing statistics correct to the end of 1972.

Brian Hall (born 1 May 1952) is a former Australian rules footballer who played with North Melbourne in the Victorian Football League (VFL).
