= Hartley, Texas =

- CDP
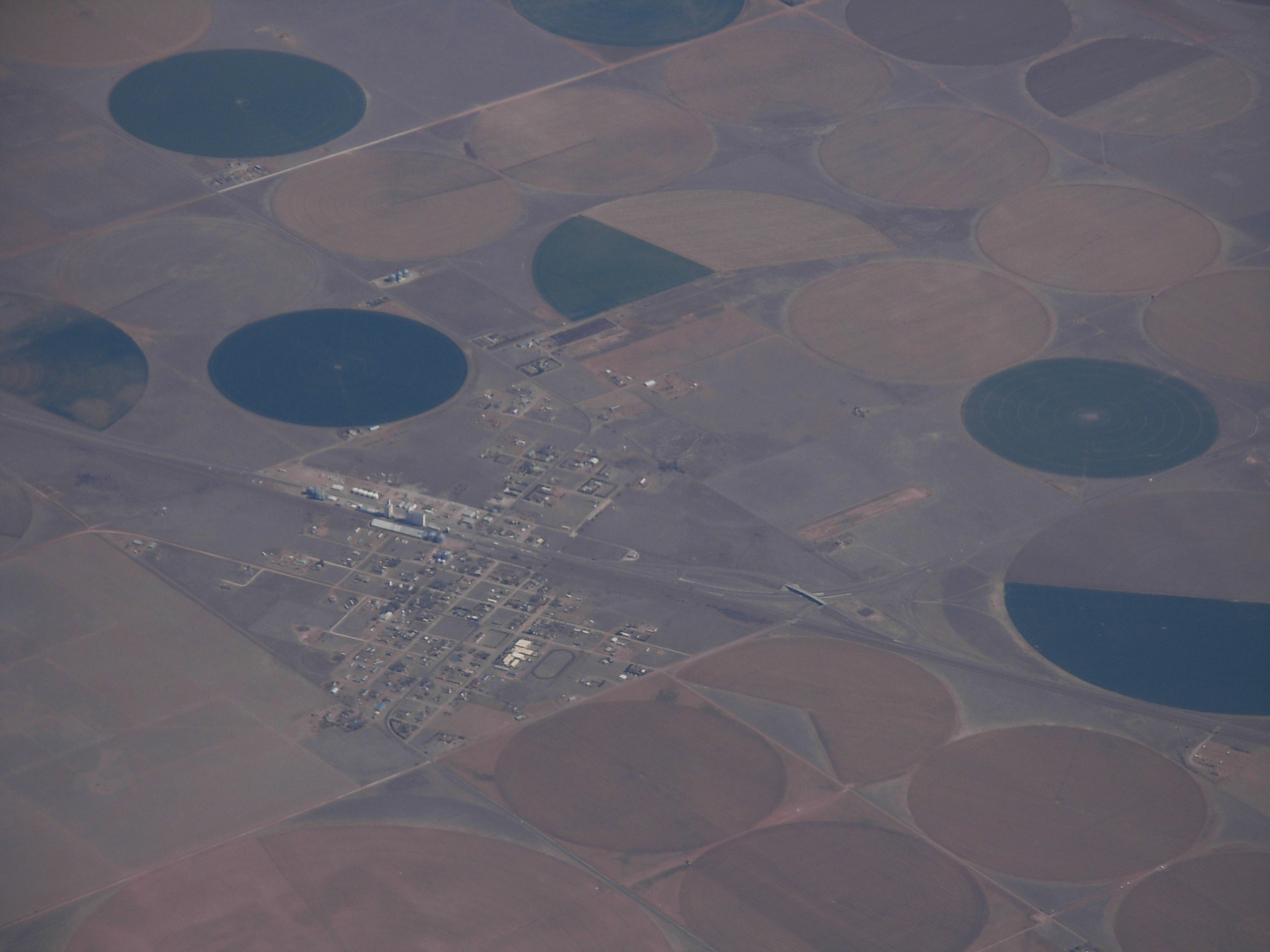
- Aerial view of Harley

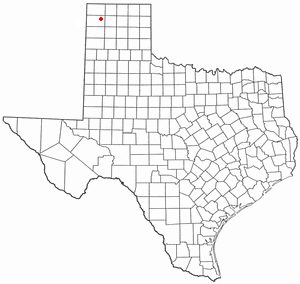
- Location of Hartley, Texas

- Coordinates: 35°53′04″N 102°23′35″W
- Country: United States
- State: Texas
- County: Hartley

Area
  - Total: 7.0 sq mi (18.1 km^{2})
  - Land: 7.0 sq mi (18.1 km^{2})
  - Water: 0 sq mi (0.0 km^{2})
- Elevation: 3,904 ft (1,190 m)

Population (2020)
  - Total: 382
  - Density: 54.7/sq mi (21.1/km^{2})
- Time zone: UTC-6 (Central (CST))
  - Summer (DST): UTC-5 (CDT)
- ZIP code: 79044
- Area code: 806
- FIPS code: 48-32612
- GNIS feature ID: 2408354

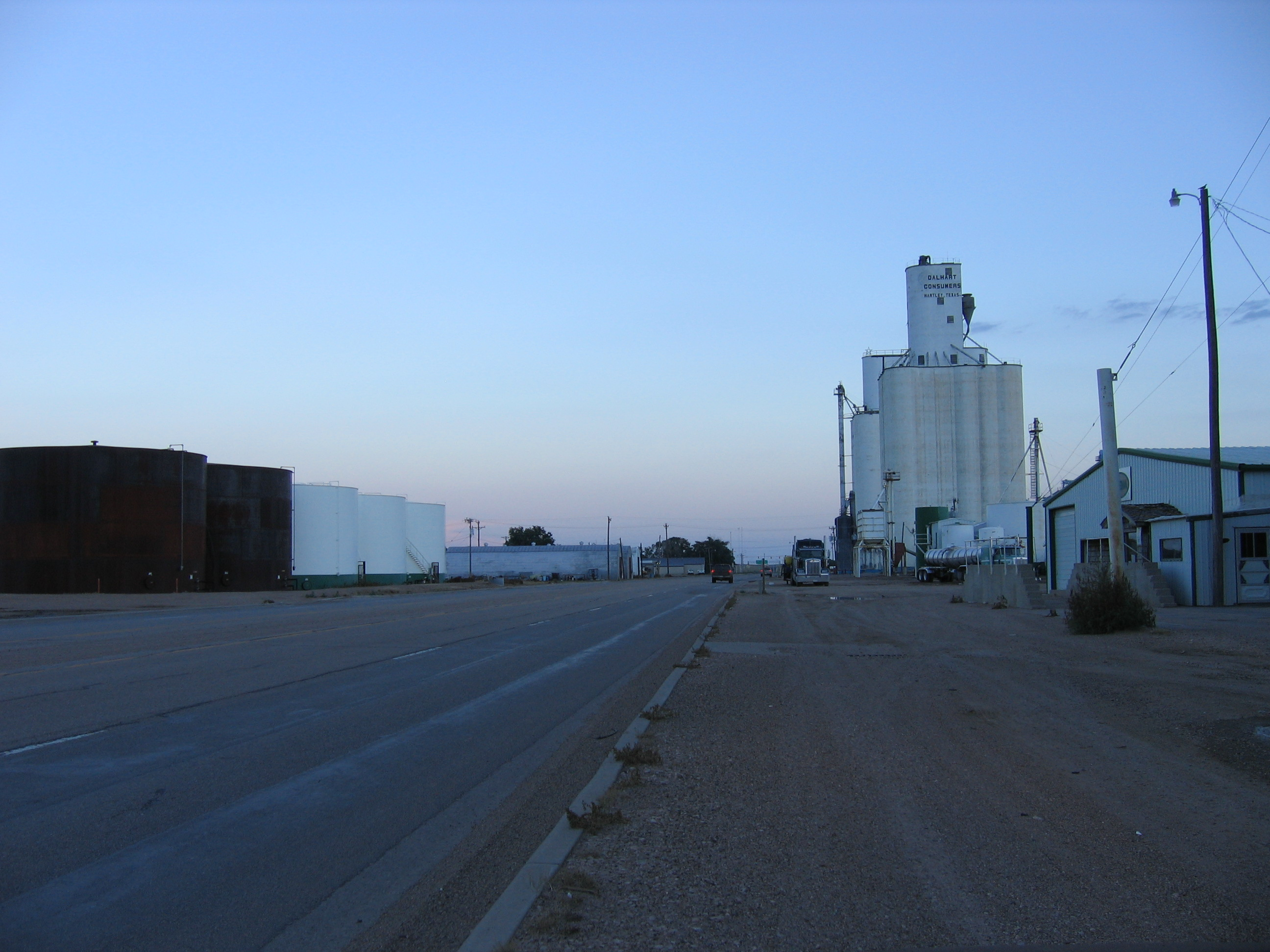
U.S. Highway 87 runs through Hartley.

Hartley is a census-designated place (CDP) in Hartley County, Texas, United States. As of the 2020 census, Hartley had a population of 382.

== History ==
In 1832, John Charles Beales and Jose Manuel Royella were granted the section where Hartley is now located under colonization laws of Mexico and Texas. They represented the Arkansas and Texas Land Company, but they failed to colonize this territory and they forfeited their rights.

In 1875, the Texas Legislature passed an act which allowed contractors to clear one mile of the Sabine, Angeline, and Neches Rivers, and the Pine Island Bayou in exchange for land grants. The contractors were required to survey the land, return field notes to the land commissioner, and request him to number the sections. The contractors then received a deed to the uneven numbered sections, with the state retaining the even-numbered ones as school lands. The field notes of Beaty, Seale, and Forwood were filed November 17, 1875. The only other deeds registered in the county prior to 1884 were those of the Fort Worth and Denver Railroad, Brooks and Burleson, Gunter and Burleson, and W.M. Lee. On July 1, 1888, Beaty, Seale, and Forwood sold Section 23 to James A. Hudson of Logan County, Illinois, and John A. Lutz of New York for $10,000.00 (equivalent to $358,333 in 2025). They sold the right-of-way to the Fort Worth and Denver Railroad July 1, 1888.

Many changes occurred in a very short time. Handbills were distributed throughout the eastern and southern states by the owners who were anxious to turn Hartley into a booming metropolis. Section 23 was plotted into lots and registered with the Land Commissioner of Texas. A tent city came into being and grew rapidly, as people came with high expectations and determination to make for themselves a new life in a new land.

== Geography ==
According to the United States Census Bureau, the CDP has a total area of 7.0 square miles (18 km^{2}), all land.

=== Climate ===
According to the Köppen climate classification, Hartley has a semiarid climate, BSk on climate maps.

Climate data for Hartley, Texas (1991–2020)
Month	Jan	Feb	Mar	Apr	May	Jun	Jul	Aug	Sep	Oct	Nov	Dec	Year
Mean daily maximum °F (°C)	49.4 (9.7)	53.5 (11.9)	62.3 (16.8)	69.5 (20.8)	78.3 (25.7)	87.7 (30.9)	91.5 (33.1)	89.0 (31.7)	82.4 (28.0)	71.5 (21.9)	59.6 (15.3)	49.3 (9.6)	70.3 (21.3)
Daily mean °F (°C)	35.3 (1.8)	38.2 (3.4)	46.4 (8.0)	54.0 (12.2)	63.6 (17.6)	73.0 (22.8)	77.6 (25.3)	75.6 (24.2)	68.4 (20.2)	56.9 (13.8)	44.7 (7.1)	35.5 (1.9)	55.8 (13.2)
Mean daily minimum °F (°C)	21.2 (−6.0)	23.0 (−5.0)	30.5 (−0.8)	38.5 (3.6)	48.8 (9.3)	58.3 (14.6)	63.7 (17.6)	62.2 (16.8)	54.3 (12.4)	42.2 (5.7)	29.8 (−1.2)	21.7 (−5.7)	41.2 (5.1)
Average precipitation inches (mm)	0.54 (14)	0.43 (11)	1.12 (28)	1.38 (35)	1.77 (45)	2.64 (67)	2.56 (65)	2.40 (61)	1.55 (39)	1.94 (49)	0.48 (12)	0.88 (22)	17.69 (448)
Average snowfall inches (cm)	3.5 (8.9)	3.4 (8.6)	1.6 (4.1)	1.3 (3.3)	0.0 (0.0)	0.0 (0.0)	0.0 (0.0)	0.0 (0.0)	0.0 (0.0)	0.0 (0.0)	1.3 (3.3)	3.4 (8.6)	14.5 (36.8)
Source: NOAA

== Demographics ==
Historical population
Census	Pop.	Note	%±
2000	441		—
2010	540		22.4%
2020	382		−29.3%
U.S. Decennial Census; 1850–1900 1910; 1920 1930 1940; 1950 1960 1970; 1980 1990 2000; 2010

Hartley first appeared as a census designated place in the 2000 U.S. census.

=== 2020 census ===
Hartley CDP, Texas – Racial and ethnic composition Note: the US Census treats Hispanic/Latino as an ethnic category. This table excludes Latinos from the racial categories and assigns them to a separate category. Hispanics/Latinos may be of any race.
Race / Ethnicity (NH = Non-Hispanic)	Pop 2000	Pop 2010	Pop 2020	% 2000	% 2010	% 2020
White alone (NH)	380	324	228	86.17%	60.00%	59.69%
Black or African American alone (NH)	2	0	0	0.45%	0.00%	0.00%
Native American or Alaska Native alone (NH)	4	2	3	0.91%	0.37%	0.79%
Asian alone (NH)	1	0	3	0.23%	0.00%	0.79%
Native Hawaiian or Pacific Islander alone (NH)	0	0	1	0.00%	0.00%	0.26%
Multiracial (NH)	5	4	3	1.13%	0.74%	0.79%
Hispanic or Latino (any race)	49	210	144	11.11%	38.89%	37.70%
Total	441	540	382	100.00%	100.00%	100.00%

As of the 2020 United States census, 382 people, 217 households, and 182 families resided in the CDP.

=== 2000 census ===
As of the 2000 census, 441 people, 149 households, and 118 families were living in the CDP. The population density was 63.2 inhabitants per square mile (24.4/km^{2}). The 157 housing units had an average density of 22.5/sq mi (8.7/km^{2}). The racial makeup of the CDP was 92.29% White, 0.45% African American, 0.91% Native American, 0.23% Asian, 4.31% from other races, and 1.81% from two or more races. Hispanics or Latinos of any race were 11.11% of the population.

Of the 149 households, 45.0% had children under 18 living with them, 69.8% were married couples living together, 3.4% had a female householder with no husband present, and 20.8% were not families. About 17.4% of all households were made up of individuals, and 10.1% had someone living alone who was 65 or older. The average household size was 2.96, and the average family size was 3.31.

In the CDP, the age distribution was 34.7% under 18, 8.4% from 18 to 24, 29.9% from 25 to 44, 18.1% from 45 to 64, and 8.8% who were 65 or older. The median age was 30 years. For every 100 females, there were 104.2 males. For every 100 females 18 and over, there were 97.3 males.

The median income in the CDP for a household was $38,500 and for a family was $45,000. Males had a median income of $25,469 versus $18,750 for females. The per capita income for the CDP was $16,150. About 10.2% of families and 10.0% of the population were below the poverty line, including 10.5% of those under 18 and 11.1% of those 65 or over.

== Education ==
Hartley is served by the Hartley Independent School District.
