= Hartley County, Texas =

County in Texas, United States

- County
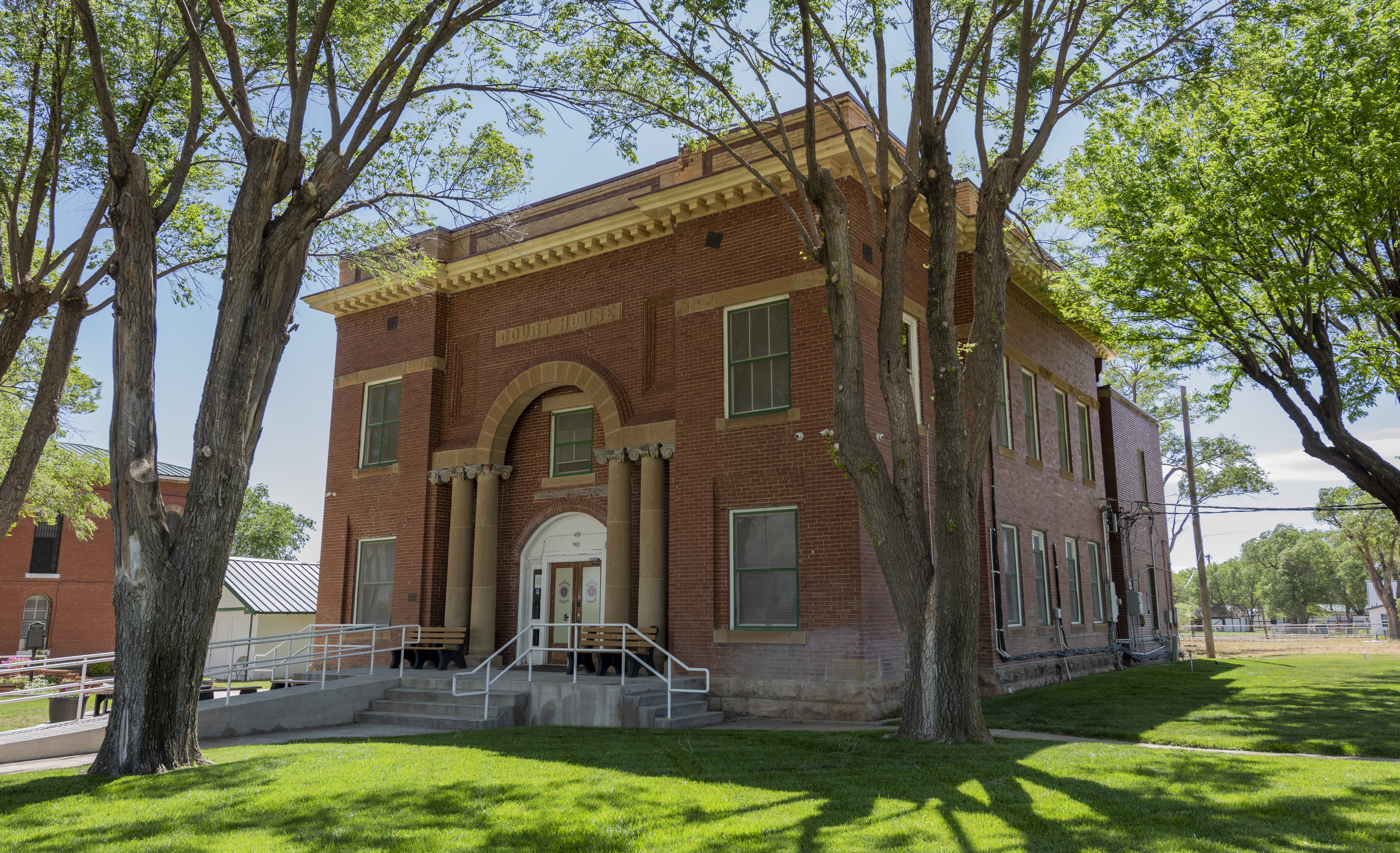
- 1906 Hartley County Courthouse

- Location within the U.S. state of Texas
- Coordinates: 35°50′N 102°37′W
- Country: United States
- State: Texas
- Founded: 1891
- Seat: Channing
- Largest community: Dalhart

Area
  - Total: 1,463 sq mi (3,790 km^{2})
  - Land: 1,462 sq mi (3,790 km^{2})
  - Water: 1.2 sq mi (3.1 km^{2}) 0.08%

Population (2020)
  - Total: 5,382
  - Estimate (2025): 4,904 ▼
  - Density: 3.7/sq mi (1.4/km^{2})
- Time zone: UTC−6 (Central)
  - Summer (DST): UTC−5 (CDT)
- Congressional district: 13th
- Website: www.co.hartley.tx.us

Hartley County is a county located in the U.S. state of Texas. As of the 2020 census, its population was 5,382. The county seat is Channing. The county was created in 1876 and later organized in 1891. It is named for Oliver C. Hartley and his brother, Rufus K. Hartley, two early Texas legislators and lawyers.

== Geography ==
According to the U.S. Census Bureau, the county has a total area of 1,463 square miles (3,790 km^{2}), of which 1,462 square miles (3,790 km^{2}) are land and 1.2 sq mi (3.1 km^{2}) (0.08%) are covered by water.

=== Major highways ===
- U.S. Highway 54
- U.S. Highway 87
- U.S. Highway 385
- State Highway 354

=== Adjacent counties ===
- Dallam County (north)
- Moore County (east)
- Oldham County (south)
- Quay County, New Mexico (southwest/Mountain Time Zone)
- Union County, New Mexico (northwest/Mountain Time Zone)

== Demographics ==
Historical population
Census	Pop.	Note	%±
1880	100		—
1890	252		152.0%
1900	377		49.6%
1910	1,298		244.3%
1920	1,109		−14.6%
1930	2,185		97.0%
1940	1,873		−14.3%
1950	1,913		2.1%
1960	2,171		13.5%
1970	2,782		28.1%
1980	3,987		43.3%
1990	3,637		−8.8%
2000	5,537		52.2%
2010	6,062		9.5%
2020	5,382		−11.2%
2025 (est.)	4,904	▼	−8.9%
U.S. Decennial Census; 1850–1900 1910; 1920 1930 1940; 1950 1960 1970; 1980 1990 2000; 2010 2020

=== Racial and ethnic composition ===
Hartley County, Texas – Racial and ethnic composition Note: the US Census treats Hispanic/Latino as an ethnic category. This table excludes Latinos from the racial categories and assigns them to a separate category. Hispanics/Latinos may be of any race.
Race / Ethnicity (NH = Non-Hispanic)	Pop 2000	Pop 2010	Pop 2020	% 2000	% 2010	% 2020
White alone (NH)	4,270	4,111	3,403	77.12%	67.82%	63.23%
Black or African American alone (NH)	445	416	191	8.04%	6.86%	3.55%
Native American or Alaska Native alone (NH)	16	18	15	0.29%	0.30%	0.28%
Asian alone (NH)	14	29	24	0.25%	0.48%	0.45%
Pacific Islander alone (NH)	1	3	5	0.02%	0.05%	0.09%
Other race alone (NH)	0	8	1	0.00%	0.13%	0.02%
Multiracial (NH)	33	29	112	0.60%	0.48%	2.08%
Hispanic or Latino (any race)	758	1,448	1,631	13.69%	23.89%	30.30%
Total	5,537	6,062	5,382	100.00%	100.00%	100.00%

=== 2020 census ===
As of the 2020 census, the county had a population of 5,382, with a median age of 38.7 years; 21.6% of the residents were under 18, and 14.6% were 65 or older. For every 100 females, there were 137.0 males, and for every 100 females 18 and over, there were 150.6 males 18 and over.

The racial makeup of the county was 69.6% White, 3.7% Black or African American, 0.6% American Indian and Alaska Native, 0.4% Asian, 0.1% Native Hawaiian and Pacific Islander, 15.6% from some other race, and 10.1% from two or more races. Hispanic or Latino residents of any race comprised 30.3% of the population.

About 53.8% of residents lived in urban areas, while 46.2% lived in rural areas.

Of the 1,716 households in the county, 35.3% had children under 18 living in them, 59.9% were married-couple households, 17.0% were households with a male householder and no spouse or partner present, and 18.9% were households with a female householder and no spouse or partner present. About 22.8% of all households were made up of individuals, and 11.9% had someone living alone who was 65 or older.

The county had 1,930 housing units, of which 11.1% were vacant. Among occupied housing units, 68.6% were owner-occupied and 31.4% were renter-occupied. The homeowner vacancy rate was 1.4%, and the rental vacancy rate was 10.9%.

=== 2000 census ===
As of the 2000 census, 5,537 people, 1,604 households, and 1,220 families were residing in the county. The population density was 4 people/mi^{2} (1.5 people/km^{2}). The 1,760 housing units had an average density of 1 per square mile (0.39/km^{2}). The racial makeup of the county was 81.07% White, 8.15% African American, 0.43% Native American, 0.27% Asian, 8.65% from other races, and 1.43% from two or more races. About 13.69% of the population were Hispanics or Latinos of any race. In ancestry, 21.0% were of German, 12.6% were of English, 12.3% were of Irish, 6.6% were of American, 4.3% were of French, 3.0% were of Scottish, and 3.0% were of Dutch.

Of the 1,604 households, 35.5% had children under 18 living with them, 68.9% were married couples living together, 4.7% had a female householder with no husband present, and 23.9% were not families; 21.6% of all households were made up of individuals, and 11.8% had someone living alone who was 65 or older. The average household size was 2.56, and the average family size was 2.98.

In the county, the age distribution was 20.8% under 18, 4.7% from 18 to 24, 35.7% from 25 to 44, 26.9% from 45 to 64, and 11.90% who were 65 or older. The median age was 40 years. For every 100 females, there were 154.1 males. For every 100 females age 18 and over, there were 172.9 males. The large difference in sex ratio is due to the prison in the county.

The median income in the county for a household was $46,327 and for a family was $53,004. Males had a median income of $29,783 versus $21,783 for females. The per capita income for the county was $18,067. About 3.70% of families and 6.60% of the population were below the poverty line, including 8.0% of those under 18 and 5.3% of those 65 or over.

== Government and infrastructure ==
The Texas Department of Criminal Justice operates the Dalhart Unit prison in an unincorporated area in the county, near Dalhart.

=== Politics ===
Hartley County is located within District 86 of the Texas House of Representatives and District 31 of the Texas Senate.

United States presidential election results for Hartley County, Texas
Year	Republican		Democratic		Third party(ies)	
Year	No.	%	No.	%	No.	%
1912	16	9.76%	116	70.73%	32	19.51%
1916	30	15.54%	161	83.42%	2	1.04%
1920	81	34.62%	144	61.54%	9	3.85%
1924	61	25.10%	156	64.20%	26	10.70%
1928	179	52.34%	163	47.66%	0	0.00%
1932	74	11.21%	586	88.79%	0	0.00%
1936	40	6.67%	560	93.33%	0	0.00%
1940	110	16.79%	545	83.21%	0	0.00%
1944	26	5.00%	484	93.08%	10	1.92%
1948	83	14.64%	477	84.13%	7	1.23%
1952	468	53.55%	402	46.00%	4	0.46%
1956	353	43.96%	448	55.79%	2	0.25%
1960	413	50.67%	397	48.71%	5	0.61%
1964	437	43.57%	565	56.33%	1	0.10%
1968	597	51.47%	299	25.78%	264	22.76%
1972	946	80.17%	206	17.46%	28	2.37%
1976	811	50.78%	774	48.47%	12	0.75%
1980	1,248	71.03%	470	26.75%	39	2.22%
1984	1,419	79.45%	356	19.93%	11	0.62%
1988	1,229	70.35%	505	28.91%	13	0.74%
1992	1,081	60.16%	406	22.59%	310	17.25%
1996	1,242	68.66%	463	25.59%	104	5.75%
2000	1,645	80.99%	359	17.68%	27	1.33%
2004	1,736	84.31%	315	15.30%	8	0.39%
2008	1,711	86.20%	250	12.59%	24	1.21%
2012	1,708	89.28%	184	9.62%	21	1.10%
2016	1,730	88.63%	173	8.86%	49	2.51%
2020	1,868	89.89%	195	9.38%	15	0.72%
2024	1,843	91.42%	163	8.09%	10	0.50%

United States Senate election results for Hartley County, Texas1
Year	Republican		Democratic		Third party(ies)	
Year	No.	%	No.	%	No.	%
2024	1,817	90.62%	172	8.58%	16	0.80%

United States Senate election results for Hartley County, Texas2
Year	Republican		Democratic		Third party(ies)	
Year	No.	%	No.	%	No.	%
2020	1,859	89.68%	176	8.49%	38	1.83%

Texas Gubernatorial election results for Hartley County
Year	Republican		Democratic		Third party(ies)	
Year	No.	%	No.	%	No.	%
2022	1,463	92.95%	96	6.10%	15	0.95%

== Communities ==
=== Cities ===
- Channing (county seat)
- Dalhart (partly in Dallam County)

=== Census-designated place ===
- Hartley

== Education ==
School districts include:

- Channing Independent School District
- Dalhart Independent School District
- Hartley Independent School District

Hartley County is in the service area of Frank Phillips College (known in legislation as Borger Junior College).

== Gallery ==
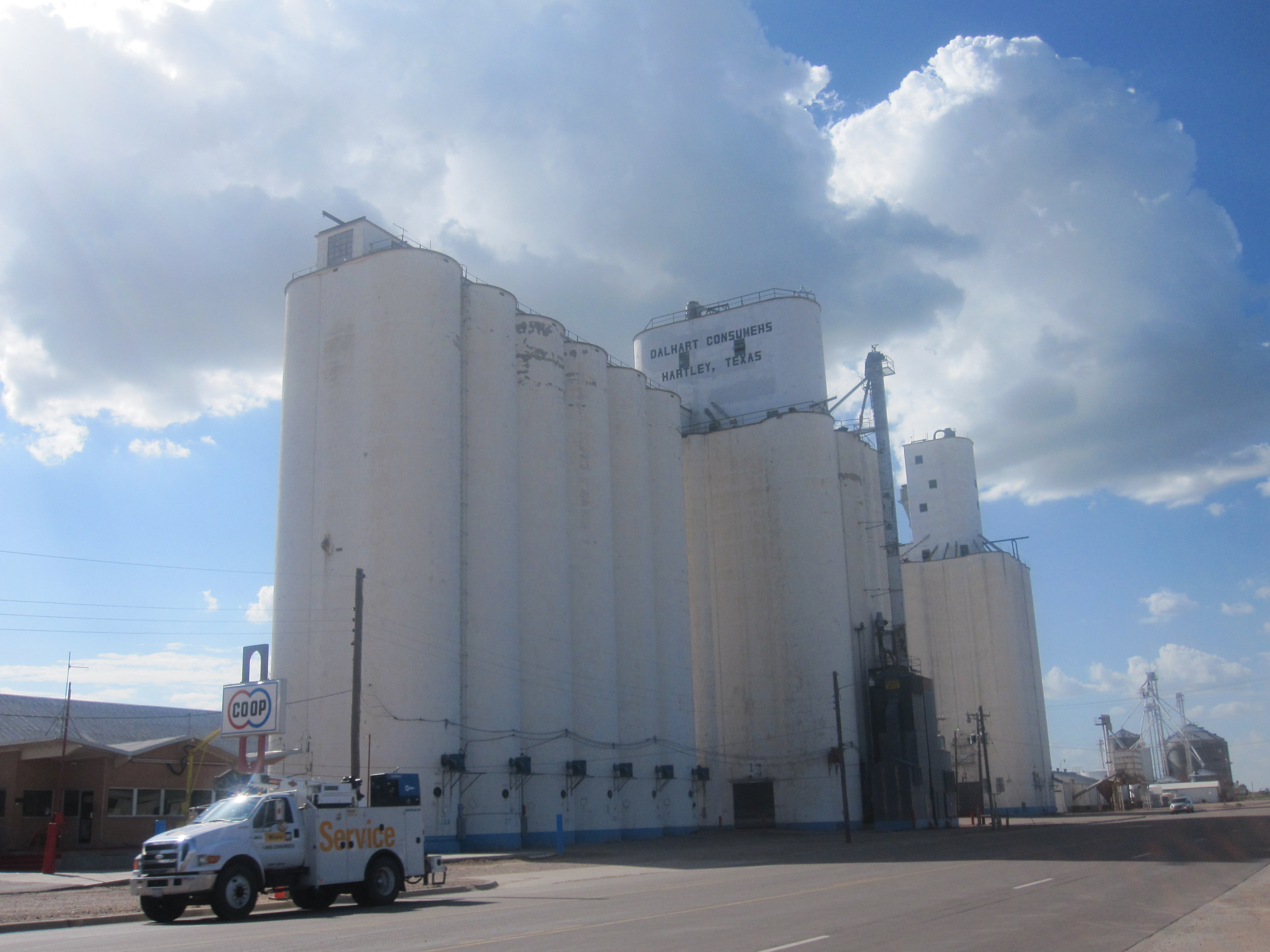
Dalhart Grain Elevator Co-op in Hartley

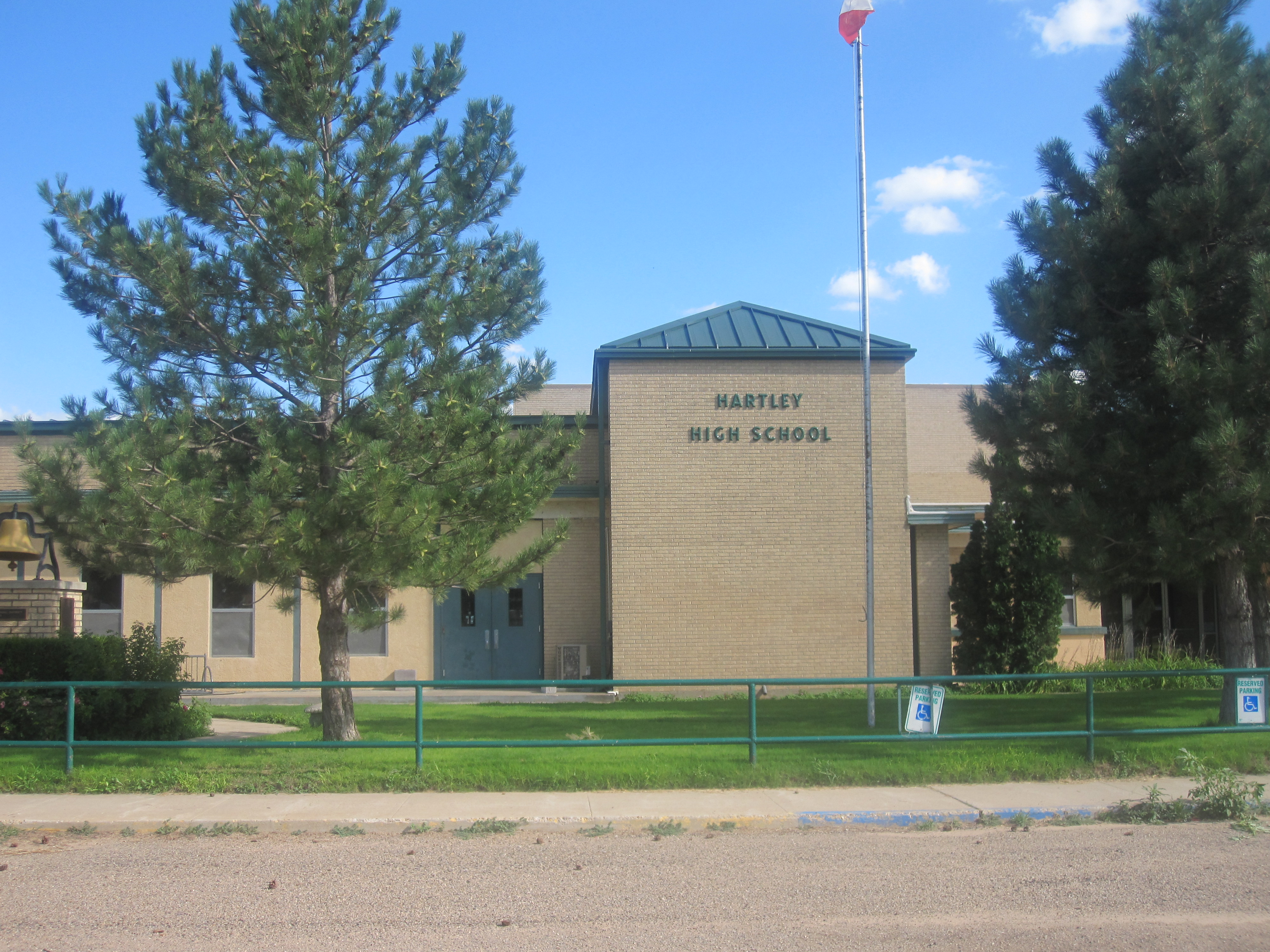
Hartley High School

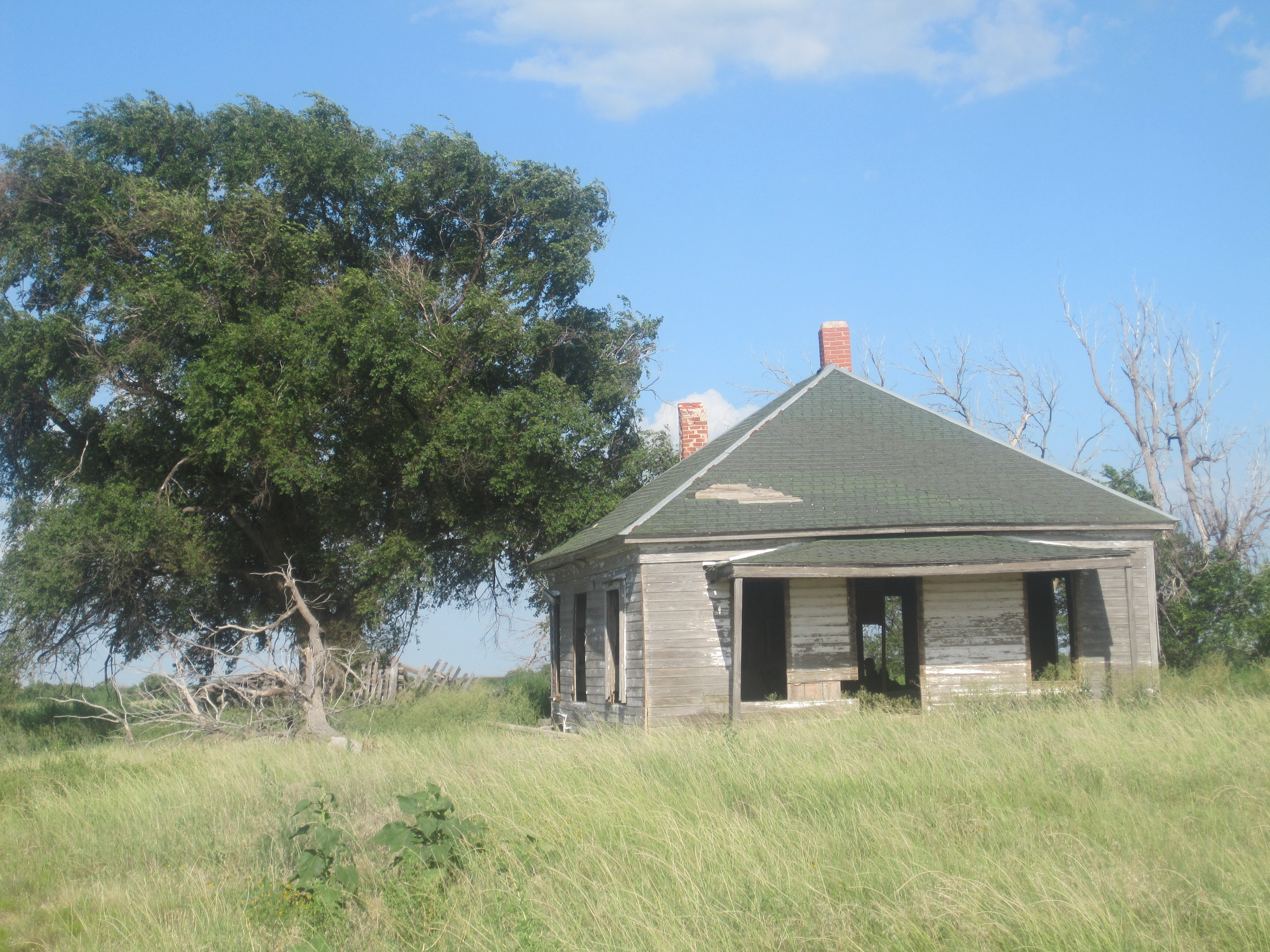
Abandoned building in northern Hartley County

Area affected by 1930s Dust Bowl

== See also ==
- List of museums in the Texas Panhandle
- National Register of Historic Places listings in Hartley County, Texas
- Recorded Texas Historic Landmarks in Hartley County
