= Dalhart, Texas =

- City
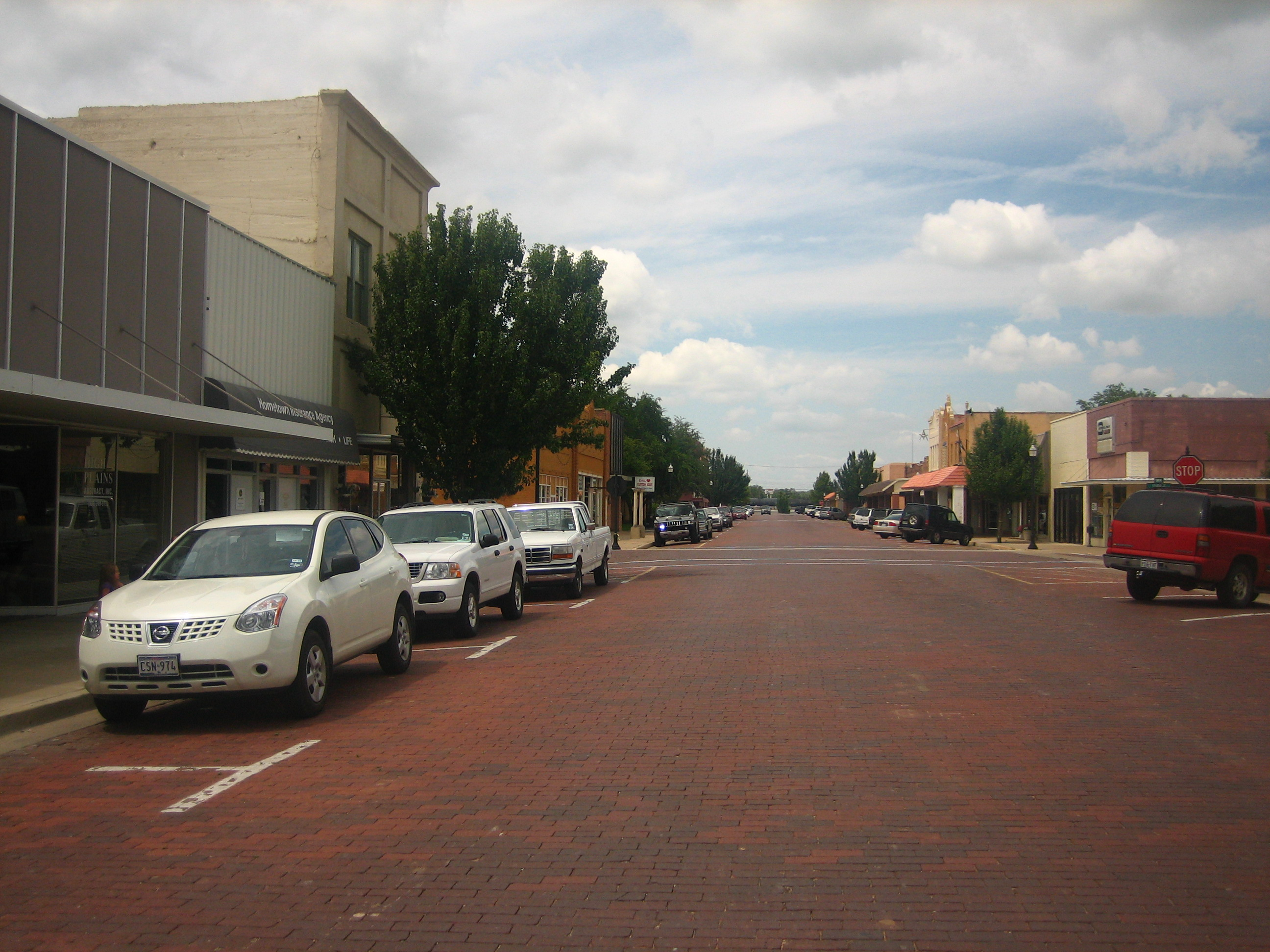
- Streets paved with brick in downtown Dalhart
- Motto: "The XIT City"
- Location within Dallam County and Texas

- Location of Dalhart Dalhart (the United States)
- Coordinates: 36°03′28″N 102°30′44″W
- Country: United States
- State: Texas
- Counties: Dallam, Hartley

Area
  - Total: 4.79 sq mi (12.41 km^{2})
  - Land: 4.78 sq mi (12.39 km^{2})
  - Water: 0.012 sq mi (0.03 km^{2})
- Elevation: 3,983 ft (1,214 m)

Population (2020)
  - Total: 8,447
  - Density: 1,762.9/sq mi (680.66/km^{2})
- Time zone: UTC−6 (Central (CST))
  - Summer (DST): UTC−5 (CDT)
- ZIP Code: 79022
- Area code: 806
- FIPS code: 48-18524
- GNIS feature ID: 2410286
- Website: www.dalharttx.gov

Dalhart is a city in Dallam and Hartley Counties in the U.S. state of Texas, and the county seat of Dallam County. Its population was 8,447 at the 2020 census.

== History ==
Founded in 1901, Dalhart is named for its location on the border of Dallam and Hartley Counties; its name is a portmanteau of the names of the two counties. The city was founded at the site of a railroad junction, which heavily contributed to its early growth.

Dalhart was in the center of the Dust Bowl, an area adversely affected by a long period of drought and dust storms during the Great Depression of the 1930s. Here, Tex Thornton, operating on the now debunked concussion theory, coaxed today's inflation-adjusted equivalent of $1 million from the locals on claims he could fire rocket-powered explosives into the clouds and cause rain.

== Geography ==
A 40-year sequence of Landsat images shows the dry Texas Panhandle near the town of Dalhart.

Dalhart is located in northwestern Texas. According to the United States Census Bureau, the city has a total area of 4.8 square miles (12.4 km^{2}), of which 0.01 square miles (0.03 km^{2}), or 0.21%, is covered by water. Dalhart sits in the Southern Great Plains and is heavily impacted by its agriculture industry. Dalhart is about 70 miles northwest of Amarillo, the nearest city that has a population over 100,000.

Dalhart sits at the intersection of U.S. Highways 54, 87, and 385. Two miles south of Dalhart is the former Rita Blanca State Park, site of Rita Blanca Canyon, now maintained by the City of Dalhart. It is 1,680 acres, plus the 160 acres of Lake Rita Blanca, on Rita Blanca Creek. The park has playground equipment and hiking/biking/riding trails. The city has added a Lake Center at which guests can check out various items, such as bicycles, board games, fishing poles and tackle, golf discs, and more.

Dalhart is located closer to six other state capitals than to Texas' capital of Austin. In surface mileage (over major highways), Dalhart is 570 miles (920 km) from Austin, but is 261 miles (420 km) from Santa Fe, New Mexico, 313 miles (504 km) from Oklahoma City, Oklahoma, 348 miles (560 km) from Denver, Colorado, 448 miles (721 km) from Cheyenne, Wyoming, 461 miles (742 km) from Topeka, Kansas, and 544 miles (875 km) from Lincoln, Nebraska.

=== Climate ===
Dalhart experiences a semiarid climate (Köppen BSk) with cool, dry winters and hot summers. The average annual rainfall of less than 17 inches or 430 millimetres strongly influences both Dalhart's ecological climate and agricultural practices, especially center-pivot irrigation.

Since records began in 1948, the hottest temperature in Dalhart has been 110 °F (43.3 °C) on June 26, 2011, and the coldest was −21 °F (−29.4 °C) on January 4, 1959. On average, 65 afternoons each year reach or top 90 °F (32 °C), 133.8 mornings fall to or below freezing, 10.1 afternoons fail to top freezing, and two mornings fall to or below 0 °F (−17.8 °C), giving a hardiness zone of 6b to 7a. The hottest calendar month has been July 2011, with an average temperature of 83.2 °F (28.4 °C) and the coldest was January 1979 with an average temperature of 24.0 °F (−4.4 °C). The wettest calendar year has been 1985 with 28.03 inches (712.0 mm) and the driest was 2011 with only 6.04 inches (153.4 mm).

Climate data for Dalhart, Texas (Dalhart Municipal Airport) (1991–2020 normals, extremes 1948–present)
| Month | Jan | Feb | Mar | Apr | May | Jun | Jul | Aug | Sep | Oct | Nov | Dec | Year |
|---|---|---|---|---|---|---|---|---|---|---|---|---|---|
| Record high °F (°C) | 82 (28) | 89 (32) | 98 (37) | 96 (36) | 102 (39) | 110 (43) | 108 (42) | 106 (41) | 104 (40) | 96 (36) | 89 (32) | 82 (28) | 110 (43) |
| Mean maximum °F (°C) | 71.0 (21.7) | 75.8 (24.3) | 83.3 (28.5) | 88.5 (31.4) | 94.5 (34.7) | 101.1 (38.4) | 102.5 (39.2) | 99.7 (37.6) | 96.2 (35.7) | 89.5 (31.9) | 79.6 (26.4) | 71.0 (21.7) | 104.0 (40.0) |
| Mean daily maximum °F (°C) | 51.3 (10.7) | 54.9 (12.7) | 63.5 (17.5) | 71.0 (21.7) | 80.2 (26.8) | 90.2 (32.3) | 93.5 (34.2) | 91.1 (32.8) | 84.2 (29.0) | 72.6 (22.6) | 60.7 (15.9) | 50.5 (10.3) | 72.0 (22.2) |
| Daily mean °F (°C) | 36.3 (2.4) | 39.5 (4.2) | 47.2 (8.4) | 55.0 (12.8) | 64.9 (18.3) | 74.9 (23.8) | 78.7 (25.9) | 76.9 (24.9) | 69.5 (20.8) | 57.1 (13.9) | 45.1 (7.3) | 36.1 (2.3) | 56.8 (13.8) |
| Mean daily minimum °F (°C) | 21.4 (−5.9) | 24.1 (−4.4) | 30.9 (−0.6) | 39.0 (3.9) | 49.7 (9.8) | 59.6 (15.3) | 64.0 (17.8) | 62.8 (17.1) | 54.9 (12.7) | 41.6 (5.3) | 29.6 (−1.3) | 21.6 (−5.8) | 41.6 (5.3) |
| Mean minimum °F (°C) | 6.0 (−14.4) | 8.3 (−13.2) | 13.9 (−10.1) | 24.6 (−4.1) | 34.5 (1.4) | 48.7 (9.3) | 56.1 (13.4) | 55.0 (12.8) | 40.8 (4.9) | 25.6 (−3.6) | 12.8 (−10.7) | 5.4 (−14.8) | 1.2 (−17.1) |
| Record low °F (°C) | −21 (−29) | −19 (−28) | 0 (−18) | 16 (−9) | 25 (−4) | 37 (3) | 49 (9) | 43 (6) | 27 (−3) | 9 (−13) | −5 (−21) | −12 (−24) | −21 (−29) |
| Average precipitation inches (mm) | 0.47 (12) | 0.35 (8.9) | 0.93 (24) | 1.25 (32) | 1.69 (43) | 2.24 (57) | 2.51 (64) | 2.16 (55) | 1.29 (33) | 1.64 (42) | 0.53 (13) | 0.54 (14) | 15.60 (396) |
| Average snowfall inches (cm) | 4.2 (11) | 3.4 (8.6) | 3.0 (7.6) | 1.5 (3.8) | 0.0 (0.0) | 0.0 (0.0) | 0.0 (0.0) | 0.0 (0.0) | 0.0 (0.0) | 1.3 (3.3) | 1.9 (4.8) | 5.0 (13) | 20.3 (52) |
| Average extreme snow depth inches (cm) | 3.3 (8.4) | 2.4 (6.1) | 2.3 (5.8) | 0.4 (1.0) | 0.0 (0.0) | 0.0 (0.0) | 0.0 (0.0) | 0.0 (0.0) | 0.0 (0.0) | 0.4 (1.0) | 1.2 (3.0) | 2.8 (7.1) | 6.3 (16) |
| Average precipitation days (≥ 0.01 in) | 2.9 | 2.8 | 4.2 | 4.9 | 6.4 | 7.5 | 7.6 | 8.2 | 5.1 | 4.1 | 3.4 | 3.4 | 60.5 |
| Average snowy days (≥ 0.1 in) | 1.8 | 2.0 | 1.6 | 0.9 | 0.1 | 0.0 | 0.0 | 0.0 | 0.0 | 0.8 | 1.1 | 2.1 | 10.4 |
Source: NOAA

== Demographics ==
Historical population
| Census | Pop. | Note | %± |
|---|---|---|---|
| 1910 | 2,580 | | — |
| 1920 | 2,676 | | 3.7% |
| 1930 | 4,691 | | 75.3% |
| 1940 | 4,682 | | −0.2% |
| 1950 | 5,918 | | 26.4% |
| 1960 | 5,160 | | −12.8% |
| 1970 | 5,705 | | 10.6% |
| 1980 | 6,854 | | 20.1% |
| 1990 | 6,246 | | −8.9% |
| 2000 | 7,237 | | 15.9% |
| 2010 | 7,930 | | 9.6% |
| 2020 | 8,447 | | 6.5% |
U.S. Decennial Census

In December 2015, the Seattle Post-Intelligencer voted Dalhart number eight of the 10 "most conservative" cities in the United States in regard to campaign contributions. Other West Texas communities in the most conservative lineup are Hereford (number one), Monahans (number five), and Childress (number nine). In contrast, Vashon Island, Washington, was named the "most liberal" city in the nation regarding political donations.

=== 2020 census ===
As of the 2020 census, Dalhart had a population of 8,447, 3,102 households, and 2,041 families. The median age was 33.6 years; 27.5% of residents were under18 and 13.4% of residents were 65 or older. For every 100 females, there were 106.5 males, and for every 100 females 18 and over, there were 108.5 males 18 and over.

About 98.7% of residents lived in urban areas, while 1.3% lived in rural areas.

Of the 3,102 households in Dalhart, 38.1% had children under 18 living in them, 50.5% were married-couple households, 21.4% were households with a male householder and no spouse or partner present, and 21.5% were households with a female householder and no spouse or partner present. About 24.1% of all households were made up of individuals, and 10.6% had someone living alone who was 65 or older.

The city had 3,532 housing units, of which 12.2% were vacant. The homeowner vacancy rate was 1.6% and the rental vacancy rate was 12.3%.

Racial composition as of the 2020 census
| Race | Number | Percentage |
|---|---|---|
| White | 4,982 | 59.0% |
| Black or African American | 79 | 0.9% |
| American Indian and Alaska Native | 122 | 1.4% |
| Asian | 30 | 0.4% |
| Native Hawaiian and other Pacific Islander | 6 | 0.1% |
| Some other race | 1,341 | 15.9% |
| Two or more races | 1,887 | 22.3% |
| Hispanic or Latino (of any race) | 3,938 | 46.6% |

=== 2010 census ===
As of the 2010 census, Dalhart had a population of 7,930 living in 2,957 households; 50.3% of the population was male, with 49.7% being female. About 28.9% of the population was under 18, while 12.4% were over 65. With an area of 4.78 square miles, the City of Dalhart has a population density of 1659.0 persons/square mile.

Census data foe self-identified race showed that 84.0% of the population were White, 1.2% were Black/African American, 0.7% were Asian, 0.9% were Native American, and 0.1% were Pacific Islander. About 10.5% of the remaining population were some other race, while 2.5% were of two or more races. About 34.0% of the population identified themselves as Hispanic or Latino of any race.

In 2010, 9.9% of the population were foreign-born, with 25.4% of households in Dalhart speaking a primary language other than English at home. Data demonstrated that 79.6% of residents over 25 had earned at least a high-school diploma, while 16.4% had obtained a bachelor's degree or higher.

Over the period between 2007 and 2011, the median household income was $53,210, with a larger mean (average) household income of $69,190. The median per-capita income was $24,979. The census showed that 6.4% of the population lived below the federal poverty line, and 3.4% of the population was unemployed. Around 71.1% of Dalhart residents owned a home, with the median home value being $91,800. As of 2010, 829 businesses were registered in the city.

== Economy ==
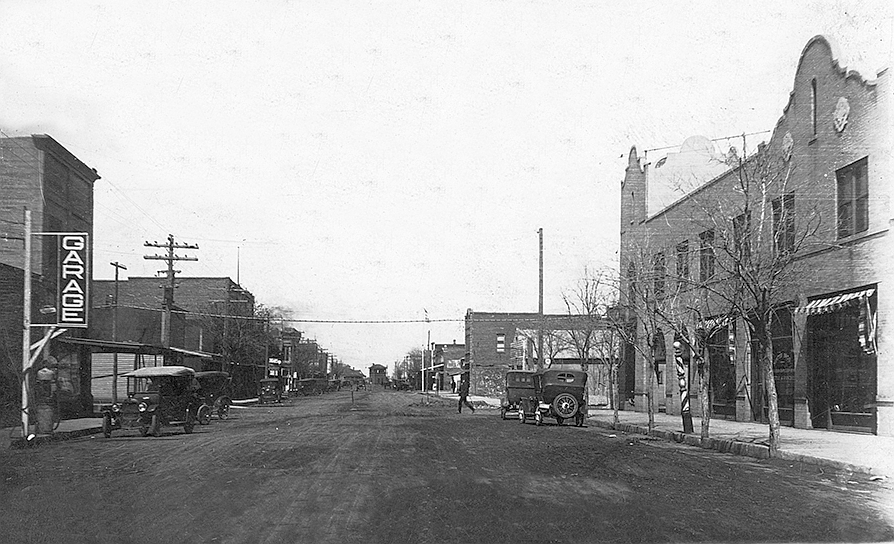
Dalhart, c. 1910–1930

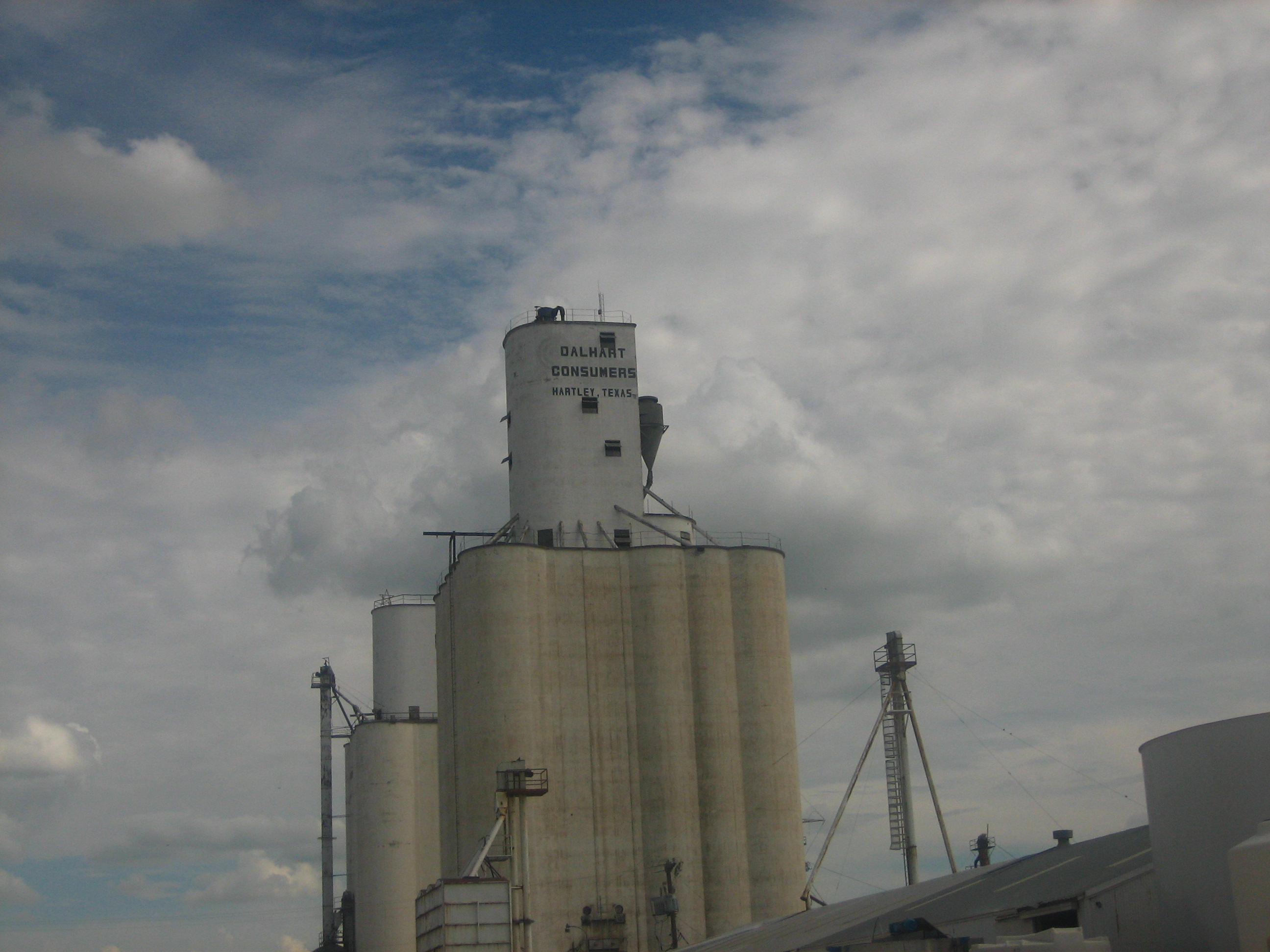
Dalhart Consumers grain elevator

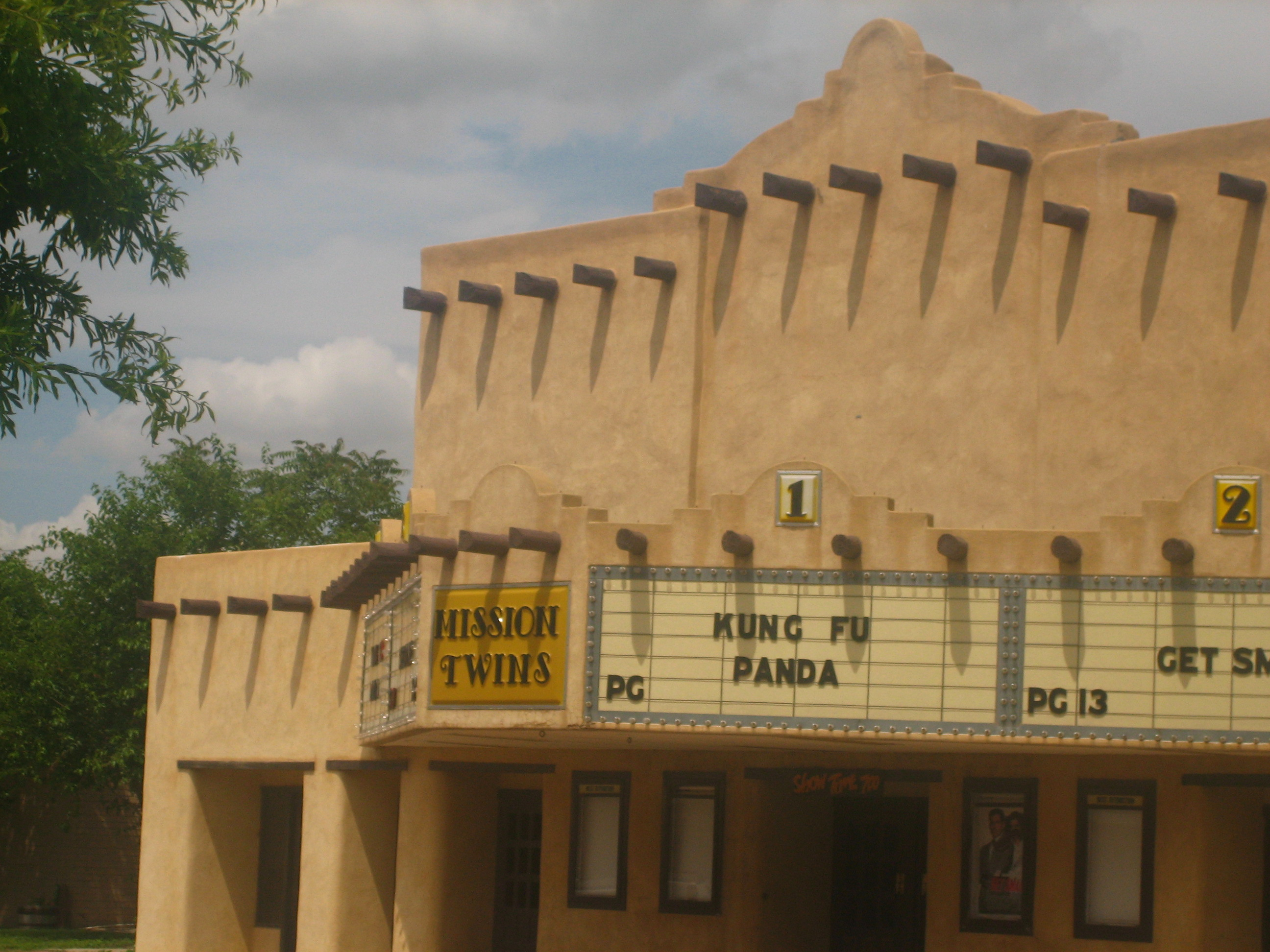
The former Mission Twins Theater in downtown Dalhart is covered in stucco over the original brick to give it an adobe look.

Dalhart's economy is centered around agribusiness, including farming, ranching, feedlot operations, large-scale pig farms, and more recently, a cheese-processing plant. Dalhart is also home to a state prison.

During the peak operating period of the XIT Ranch, the land was in native grass. Some land was diverted into dry farmland, but the rain was insufficient to make it productive. A few irrigation wells were drilled in areas where the soil was not sandy and was level enough for row irrigation. Later, center pivot irrigation, credited to Colorado farmer Frank Zybach in 1949, was introduced and was found to be ideal for the area's rolling, sandy soils. About the same time, large feedlots were built due to the low-humidity climate. This created a good market for corn, which is the major crop grown by farmers in the area.

In the mid-2000s, a combination of tax incentives, Texas' relatively unrestricted environmental regulations, and Dalhart's existing agricultural infrastructure attracted industrial dairy farms to the area. In 2007, Hilmar Cheese Company of California capitalized on the resulting milk availability, opening a major production plant in Dalhart. Texas Governor Rick Perry visited Dalhart to speak at the company's official welcoming ceremony, reiterating the company's projection that 2000 new jobs would be created in the region by the emerging dairy product production industry. This factory and the surrounding dairies are a significant emerging subsector of Dalhart's established agribusiness culture.

The international agribusiness company Cargill owns a 21,500-acre hog-production site near Dalhart.

== Arts and culture ==
Dalhart is known as the "XIT City" because of its relationship with the historic XIT Ranch. The ranch was a 3,000,000-acre (12,000 km^{2}) plot of land traded in exchange for the construction of the Texas State Capitol in Austin. The ranch was dissolved in 1912, but its history is celebrated with the city's XIT Museum and the XIT Rodeo and Reunion. Held annually on the first full Thursday through Sunday weekend of August, the event includes the world's largest free barbecue, junior rodeo, Professional Rodeo Cowboys Association events, and three nights of live music.

The Muscle Car Party Weekend held each year in May includes a classic car show, bicycle drag races, and dinner and dance. The events are sponsored by the Dalhart Cruzers Car Club, and each year, the club raffles a classic car.

== Education ==
The Dalhart Independent School District serves the city of Dalhart. The district has an elementary school, intermediate school, junior high school, and high school. Students attend Dalhart High School, which competes athletically and scholastically in District 1 Division 3A of Texas' University Interscholastic League.

Dallam County is in the service area of Frank Phillips College (known in legislation as Borger Junior College). In 2012, Frank Phillips College opened a branch in Dalhart, offering both credit and community-education classes.

== Media ==
The Dalhart Texan was established in 1901, and is published in Dalhart, currently published twice a week and has been owned by the Hogue family for the past 60 years.

== Infrastructure ==
=== Prison system ===
The Texas Department of Criminal Justice's Dalhart Unit prison is located in unincorporated Hartley County near Dalhart.

== See also ==
- Dalhart Municipal Airport
