= McFaddin =

McFaddin is a surname. Notable people with the surname include:

- William M. McFaddin (1819-1898)
- William Perry Herring McFaddin (1856-1935)

== See also ==
- McFaddin, Texas, unincorporated community in Victoria County, Texas, United States
- McFaddin-Ward House, Beaux-Arts colonial style house in Beaumont, Texas
- McFaddin National Wildlife Refuge, located on the northern Gulf Coast of Texas, United States
