= William McFaddin =

William McFaddin may refer to:

- William M. McFaddin (1819–1898), served in the Texas Revolution
- William Perry Herring McFaddin (1856–1935), Texas rancher
