= National Register of Historic Places listings in Marion County, Texas =

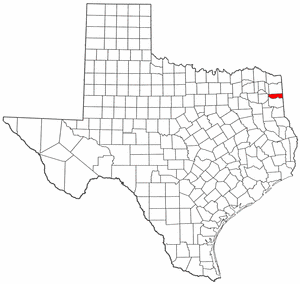
Location of Marion County in Texas

This is a list of the National Register of Historic Places listings in Marion County, Texas.

This is intended to be a complete list of properties and districts listed on the National Register of Historic Places in Marion County, Texas. There are one district and 17 individual properties listed on the National Register in the county. Sixteen individually listed properties are Recorded Texas Historic Landmarks while the district contains many more including one that is a State Antiquities Landmark.

This National Park Service list is complete through NPS recent listings posted March 21, 2025.

== Current listings ==
The locations of National Register properties and districts may be seen in a mapping service provided.

	Name on the Register	Image	Date listed	Location	City or town	Description
1	Alley-Carlson House	Alley-Carlson House	October 28, 1969 (#69000206)	501 Walker St. 32°45′34″N 94°21′00″W	Jefferson	Recorded Texas Historic Landmark; part of Jefferson Historic District
2	Birge-Beard House	Birge-Beard House	August 25, 1970 (#70000754)	212 N. Vale St. 32°45′27″N 94°20′46″W	Jefferson	Recorded Texas Historic Landmark; part of Jefferson Historic District
3	Epperson-McNutt House	Epperson-McNutt House	October 28, 1969 (#69000207)	409 S. Alley St. 32°45′27″N 94°21′06″W	Jefferson	Recorded Texas Historic Landmark; part of Jefferson Historic District
4	Excelsior Hotel	Excelsior Hotel	October 28, 1969 (#69000208)	Austin St., between Market and Vale Sts. 32°45′21″N 94°20′44″W	Jefferson	Recorded Texas Historic Landmark; part of Jefferson Historic District
5	Freeman Plantation House	Freeman Plantation House	November 25, 1969 (#69000209)	0.8 mi (1.3 km). west of Jefferson on TX 49; 32°45′48″N 94°22′12″W	Jefferson	Recorded Texas Historic Landmark
6	Hodge-Taylor House	Hodge-Taylor House	March 21, 1997 (#97000259)	Approximately 1 mi (1.6 km) southwest of junction of US 59 and TX 49, W. 32°45′54″N 94°22′20″W	Jefferson	
7	Jefferson Historic District	Jefferson Historic District	March 31, 1971 (#71000949)	Roughly bounded by Owens, Dixon, Walnut, Camp, and Taylor Sts. 32°45′21″N 94°20′46″W	Jefferson	Includes State Antiquities Landmark, Recorded Texas Historic Landmarks
8	Jefferson Ordnance Magazine	Jefferson Ordnance Magazine	February 17, 1995 (#95000102)	0.3 mi (0.48 km) northeast of US 59B crossing of Big Cypress Bayou; 32°45′29″N 94°20′18″W	Jefferson	Recorded Texas Historic Landmark
9	Jefferson Playhouse	Jefferson Playhouse	October 28, 1969 (#69000374)	Northwest corner of Market and Henderson Sts. 32°45′25″N 94°20′51″W	Jefferson	Recorded Texas Historic Landmark; part of Jefferson Historic District
10	The Magnolias	The Magnolias	March 31, 1971 (#71000951)	209 E. Broadway; 32°45′42″N 94°21′10″W	Jefferson	Recorded Texas Historic Landmark
11	Old U.S. Post Office and Courts Building	Old U.S. Post Office and Courts Building	October 28, 1969 (#69000210)	223 W. Austin St. 32°45′20″N 94°20′45″W	Jefferson	Recorded Texas Historic Landmark; part of Jefferson Historic District
12	Capt. William Perry House	Capt. William Perry House	August 25, 1970 (#70000755)	Northwest corner of Walnut and Clarksville Sts. 32°45′38″N 94°20′49″W	Jefferson	Recorded Texas Historic Landmark
13	Planters Bank Building	Planters Bank Building	March 11, 1971 (#71000952)	224 E. Austin St. 32°45′26″N 94°20′42″W	Jefferson	Recorded Texas Historic Landmark; part of Jefferson Historic District
14	Presbyterian Manse	Presbyterian Manse	October 28, 1969 (#69000211)	Northeast corner of Alley and Delta Sts. 32°45′27″N 94°21′03″W	Jefferson	Recorded Texas Historic Landmark; part of Jefferson Historic District
15	Sedberry House	Sedberry House	August 25, 1970 (#70000756)	211 N. Market St. 32°45′24″N 94°20′51″W	Jefferson	Recorded Texas Historic Landmark; part of Jefferson Historic District
16	Capt. William E. Singleton House	Capt. William E. Singleton House	August 25, 1970 (#70000757)	204 N. Soda St. 32°45′37″N 94°21′21″W	Jefferson	Recorded Texas Historic Landmark
17	Stilley-Young House	Stilley-Young House	September 28, 2005 (#05001105)	405 Moseley St. 32°45′22″N 94°21′05″W	Jefferson	Recorded Texas Historic Landmark; State Antiquities Landmark
18	Perry M. Woods House	Perry M. Woods House	March 31, 1971 (#71000953)	502 Walker St. 32°45′33″N 94°21′00″W	Jefferson	Recorded Texas Historic Landmark; part of Jefferson Historic District

== See also ==
- National Register of Historic Places listings in Texas
- Recorded Texas Historic Landmarks in Marion County
