= National Register of Historic Places listings in Kent County, Texas =

Location of Kent County in Texas

This is a list of the National Register of Historic Places listings in Kent County, Texas.

This is intended to be a complete list of properties listed on the National Register of Historic Places in Kent County, Texas. There is one property listed on the National Register in the county. This property is also a Recorded Texas Historic Landmark.

This National Park Service list is complete through NPS recent listings posted March 21, 2025.

== Current listings ==
The locations of National Register properties may be seen in a mapping service provided.

	Name on the Register	Image	Date listed	Location	City or town	Description
1	First National Bank Building	First National Bank Building	August 29, 1977 (#97001209)	402 Donaho St. 33°14′52″N 100°34′27″W	Jayton	Recorded Texas Historic Landmark

== See also ==
- National Register of Historic Places listings in Texas
- Recorded Texas Historic Landmarks in Kent County
