= National Register of Historic Places listings in Jefferson County, Texas =

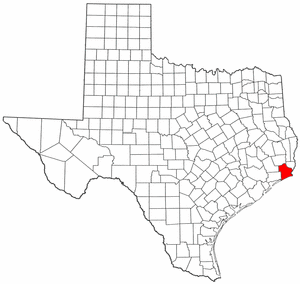
Location of Jefferson County in Texas

This is a list of the National Register of Historic Places listings in Jefferson County, Texas.

This is intended to be a complete list of properties and districts listed on the National Register of Historic Places in Jefferson County, Texas. There are one National Historic Landmark, three districts, and 21 other individual properties listed on the National Register in the county. Two individually listed properties are State Antiquities Landmarks including one along with ten other individual properties that are Recorded Texas Historic Landmarks. One district contains additional Recorded Texas Historic Landmarks.

This National Park Service list is complete through NPS recent listings posted January 23, 2026.

== Current listings ==
The locations of National Register properties and districts may be seen in a mapping service provided.

	Name on the Register	Image	Date listed	Location	City or town	Description
1	Beaumont Commercial District	Beaumont Commercial District	April 14, 1978 (#78002959); March 4, 2008 boundary increase (#07000892)	Roughly bounded by Orleans, Bowie, Neches, Crockett, Laurel, Willow, Broadway, Pearl, Main, and Gilbert Sts. 30°04′55″N 94°05′56″W	Beaumont	Includes Recorded Texas Historic Landmarks
2	Beaumont Y.M.C.A.	Beaumont Y.M.C.A.	March 30, 1979 (#79002985)	934 Calder St. 30°05′09″N 94°07′36″W	Beaumont	
3	Holmes Duke House	Holmes Duke House	October 4, 1984 (#84000028)	694 Forrest St. 30°05′15″N 94°06′18″W	Beaumont	Recorded Texas Historic Landmark
4	Eddingston Court	Eddingston Court	October 22, 2004 (#04001175)	3300 Proctor St; 29°53′44″N 93°54′44″W	Port Arthur	Sculpture by Dionicio Rodriguez in Texas MPS
5	First National Bank of Port Arthur		November 24, 2015 (#15000837)	501 Proctor St; 29°52′19″N 93°56′06″W	Port Arthur	Now houses the Port Arthur Chamber of Commerce
6	French Home Trading Post	French Home Trading Post	October 15, 1970 (#70000752)	2995 French Rd. 30°06′36″N 94°08′35″W	Beaumont	Recorded Texas Historic Landmark
7	Gates Memorial Library	Gates Memorial Library	May 4, 1981 (#81000632)	317 Stilwell Blvd. 29°52′42″N 93°55′38″W	Port Arthur	Recorded Texas Historic Landmark
8	Hinchee House	Hinchee House	November 21, 1978 (#78002960)	1814 Park St. 30°04′12″N 94°05′38″W	Beaumont	Recorded Texas Historic Landmark
9	Idle Hours	Idle Hours	May 22, 1978 (#78002961)	1608 Orange St. 30°04′07″N 94°05′57″W	Beaumont	
10	Jefferson County Courthouse	Jefferson County Courthouse	June 17, 1982 (#82004509)	1149 Pearl St. 30°04′44″N 94°05′36″W	Beaumont	State Antiquities Landmark
11	Jefferson Theatre	Jefferson Theatre	January 30, 1978 (#78002962)	345 Fannin St. 30°04′54″N 94°05′52″W	Beaumont	Recorded Texas Historic Landmark, part of Beaumont Commercial District
12	Lamar State College of Technology Administration Building	Lamar State College of Technology Administration Building	November 27, 2015 (#15000838)	1026 Mirabeau St. 30°02′34″N 94°04′21″W	Beaumont	
13	Lucas Gusher, Spindletop Oil Field	Lucas Gusher, Spindletop Oil Field	November 13, 1966 (#66000818)	3 mi (4.8 km). S of Beaumont on Spindletop Ave. 30°01′12″N 94°04′31″W	Beaumont	
14	Marconi Tower at Port Arthur College	Marconi Tower at Port Arthur College	August 5, 2008 (#08000756)	1500 Procter St. 29°52′46″N 93°55′35″W	Port Arthur	
15	McFaddin House Complex	McFaddin House Complex	January 25, 1971 (#71000942)	1906 McFaddin St. 30°05′14″N 94°06′56″W	Beaumont	Recorded Texas Historic Landmark
16	Mildred Buildings	Mildred Buildings	December 1, 1978 (#78002963)	1400 block of Calder Ave. 30°05′08″N 94°06′36″W	Beaumont	Recorded Texas Historic Landmark
17	Pompeiian Villa	Pompeiian Villa	May 23, 1973 (#73001967)	1953 Lakeshore Dr. 29°52′59″N 93°55′22″W	Port Arthur	Recorded Texas Historic Landmark
18	Port Arthur Downtown Historic District		January 14, 2021 (#100006046)	Roughly bounded by West Reverend Doctor Ransom Howard St., Fort Worth Ave., Lakeshore Dr., and Waco St. 29°52′20″N 93°56′09″W	Port Arthur	
19	Port Arthur Federated Women's Clubhouse	Port Arthur Federated Women's Clubhouse	July 18, 1985 (#85001559)	1924 Lakeshore Dr. 29°52′54″N 93°55′22″W	Port Arthur	Recorded Texas Historic Landmark
20	Port Arthur-Orange Bridge	Port Arthur-Orange Bridge	October 10, 1996 (#96001127)	TX 87 at the Jefferson and Orange Cnty. line 29°58′47″N 93°52′18″W	Groves	Historic Bridges of Texas, 1866-1945 MPS; extends into Orange County
21	Rose Hill	Rose Hill	October 31, 1979 (#79002986)	100 Woodworth Blvd. 29°53′24″N 93°54′54″W	Port Arthur	State Antiquities Landmark, Recorded Texas Historic Landmark
22	Sanders House	Sanders House	December 13, 1978 (#78002964)	479 Pine; 30°05′10″N 94°05′53″W	Beaumont	Recorded Texas Historic Landmark
23	Temple to the Brave		January 26, 2026 (#100012637)	1365 Pennsylvania Avenue; 30°04′27″N 94°05′34″W	Beaumont	
24	US Post Office and Federal Building	US Post Office and Federal Building	May 12, 1986 (#86001099)	500 Austin Ave. 29°52′22″N 93°56′07″W	Port Arthur	
25	Woman's Club of Beaumont Clubhouse	Woman's Club of Beaumont Clubhouse	August 16, 1994 (#94000983)	575 Magnolia Ave. 30°05′11″N 94°06′15″W	Beaumont	

== See also ==
- National Register of Historic Places listings in Texas
- Recorded Texas Historic Landmarks in Jefferson County
