= National Register of Historic Places listings in Lubbock County, Texas =

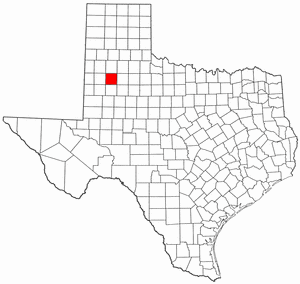
Location of Lubbock County in Texas

List of NRHP-registered historic places in Lubbock County, Texas

This list is intended to be a complete list of properties and districts listed on the National Register of Historic Places in Lubbock County, Texas. There are four districts and 17 individual properties including one National Historic Landmark in the county. Three properties are also Recorded Texas Historic Landmarks.

This National Park Service list is complete through NPS recent listings posted July 31, 2026.

== Current listings ==
The publicly disclosed locations of National Register properties and districts may be seen in a mapping service provided.

	Name on the Register	Image	Date listed	Location	City or town	Description
1	Warren and Myrta Bacon House	Warren and Myrta Bacon House	July 15, 1982 (#82004512)	1802 Broadway; 33°35′06″N 101°51′23″W	Lubbock	Recorded Texas Historic Landmark
2	Cactus Theater	Cactus Theater	May 8, 1998 (#98000447)	1812 Buddy Holly Ave. 33°34′42″N 101°50′39″W	Lubbock	
3	Canyon Lakes Archeological District	Canyon Lakes Archeological District	March 26, 1976 (#76002049)	Address restricted	Lubbock	
4	Carlock Building	Carlock Building	July 28, 2004 (#04000767)	1001-1013 13th St. 33°35′00″N 101°50′45″W	Lubbock	
5	Federal Building and U.S. Courthouse		August 4, 2026 (#100013293)	1205 Texas Avenue; 33°35′03″N 101°50′44″W	Lubbock	
6	Fort Worth and Denver South Plains Railway Depot	Fort Worth and Denver South Plains Railway Depot	July 26, 1990 (#90001120)	1801 Ave. G 33°34′43″N 101°50′32″W	Lubbock	
7	Great Plains Life Insurance Company Building	Great Plains Life Insurance Company Building	March 17, 2021 (#100006318)	1220 Broadway; 33°35′05″N 101°50′56″W	Lubbock	AKA Metro Tower or NTS Tower.
8	Holden Properties Historic District	Holden Properties Historic District	May 29, 1998 (#98000602)	3103, 3105, 3105A, 3105B, 3107, 3109, and 3111 20th St. 33°34′34″N 101°52′56″W	Lubbock	
9	William Curry and Olive Price Holden House	William Curry and Olive Price Holden House	August 5, 1994 (#94000834)	3109 20th St. 33°34′34″N 101°52′54″W	Lubbock	Part of Holden Properties Historic District
10	In Town Inn		September 1, 2022 (#100008171)	1212 Main St. 33°35′08″N 101°50′54″W	Lubbock	
11	Kress Building	Kress Building	October 2, 1992 (#92001305)	1109 Broadway; 33°35′05″N 101°50′50″W	Lubbock	
12	Lubbock County Jail	Lubbock County Jail	February 13, 2018 (#100002130)	811 Main St. 33°35′08″N 101°50′38″W	Lubbock	
13	Lubbock High School	Lubbock High School	May 1, 1985 (#85000924)	2004 19th St. 33°34′41″N 101°51′35″W	Lubbock	Recorded Texas Historic Landmark
14	Lubbock Lake Site	Lubbock Lake Site	June 21, 1971 (#71000948)	Landmark Dr off US 84; 33°37′19″N 101°53′23″W	Lubbock	
15	Lubbock Post Office and Federal Building	Lubbock Post Office and Federal Building	February 17, 1995 (#95000101)	800 Broadway; 33°35′06″N 101°50′35″W	Lubbock	
16	Pittsburgh Plate Glass Company		March 13, 2026 (#100012805)	611 23rd Street; 33°34′27″N 101°50′30″W	Lubbock	
17	Fred and Annie Snyder House	Fred and Annie Snyder House	January 28, 1992 (#91002019)	2701 19th St. 33°34′38″N 101°52′30″W	Lubbock	
18	South Overton Residential Historic District	South Overton Residential Historic District	March 14, 1996 (#96000276)	Roughly bounded by Broadway, Ave. Q., 19th St. and University Ave. 33°34′51″N 101°51′47″W	Lubbock	
19	Texas Technological College Dairy Barn	Texas Technological College Dairy Barn	April 2, 1992 (#92000336)	Texas Tech University campus 33°34′53″N 101°52′40″W	Lubbock	Recorded Texas Historic Landmark; part of Texas Technological College Historic District
20	Texas Technological College Historic District	Texas Technological College Historic District	May 10, 1996 (#96000523)	Roughly bounded by 6th St., University Ave., 19th St., and Flint St. 33°35′02″N 101°52′28″W	Lubbock	
21	Tubbs-Carlisle House	Tubbs-Carlisle House	November 2, 1990 (#90001719)	602 Fulton Ave. 33°35′23″N 101°56′35″W	Lubbock	Recorded Texas Historic Landmark

== See also ==
- National Register of Historic Places listings in Texas
- Recorded Texas Historic Landmarks in Lubbock County
