= Pompeiian Villa =

Historic house in Texas, United States

- U.S. National Register of Historic Places
- Recorded Texas Historic Landmark
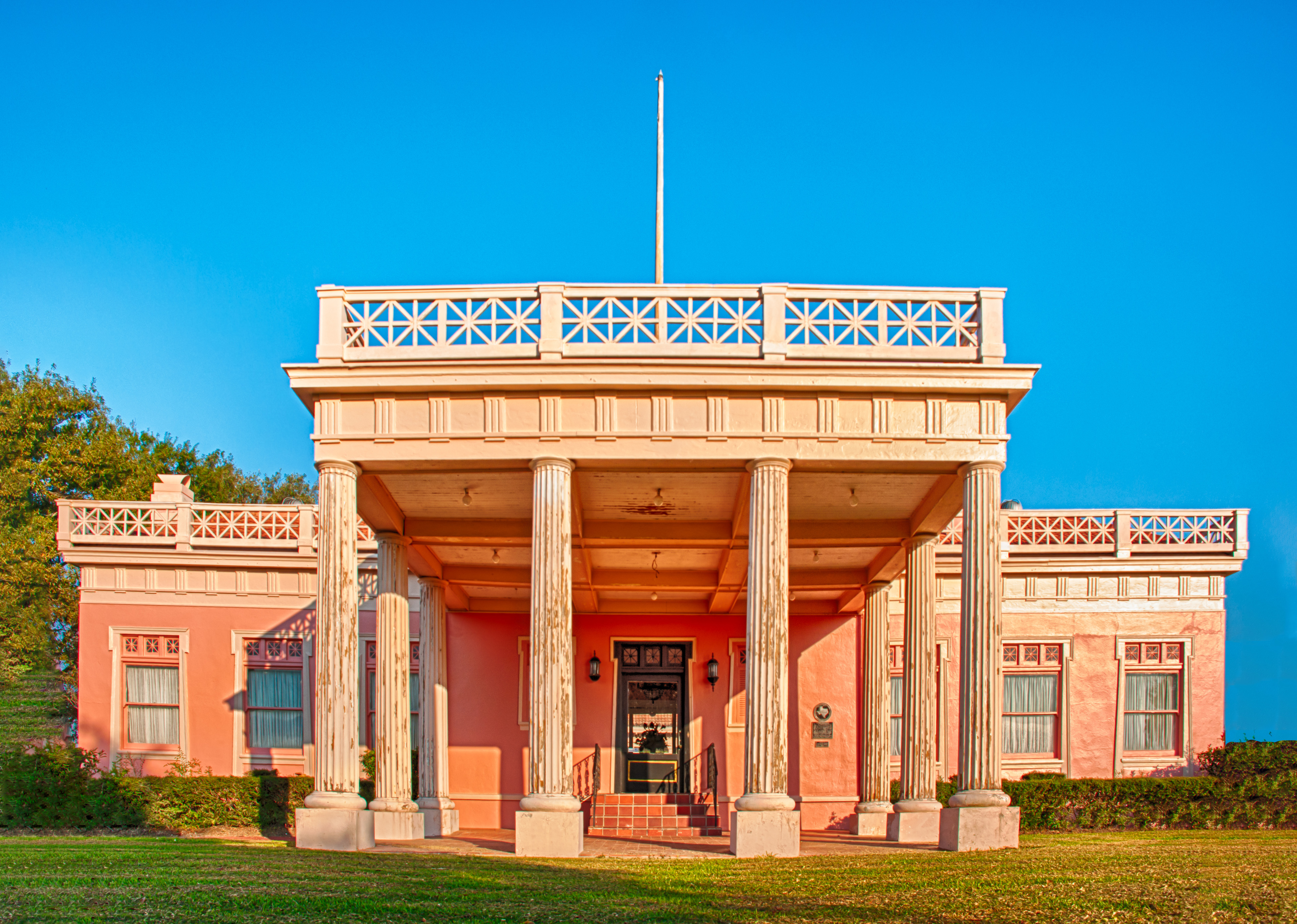
- Pompeiian Villa in 2012

- Location within Texas Location within the United States
- Interactive map showing the location of Pompeiian Villa
- Location: 1953 Lakeshore Dr., Port Arthur, Texas
- Coordinates: 29°52′59″N 93°55′22″W
- Area: 2.5 acres (1.0 ha)
- Built: 1900
- Architect: George C. Nimmons
- Architectural style: Classical Revival
- Website: Pompeiian Villa
- NRHP reference No.: 73001967
- RTHL No.: 10512

Significant dates
- Added to NRHP: May 23, 1973
- Designated RTHL: 1973

The Pompeiian Villa is a historic house in Port Arthur, Texas, U.S.. It was built in 1900 for Isaac Ellwood, and designed by architects George C. Nimmons and William K. Fellows. It belonged to James Hopkins, the vice president of the Diamond Match Company, from 1901 to 1903, when it was sold to George Craig for 10% of Texaco. It has been listed on the National Register of Historic Places since May 23, 1973.

The house is owned by the Port Arthur Historical Society, and is open for tours by reservation with the Museum of the Gulf Coast.

== See also ==
- National Register of Historic Places listings in Jefferson County, Texas
- Recorded Texas Historic Landmarks in Jefferson County
