= Presbyterian Manse (Jefferson, Texas) =

Historic house in Texas, United States

- U.S. National Register of Historic Places
- Recorded Texas Historic Landmark
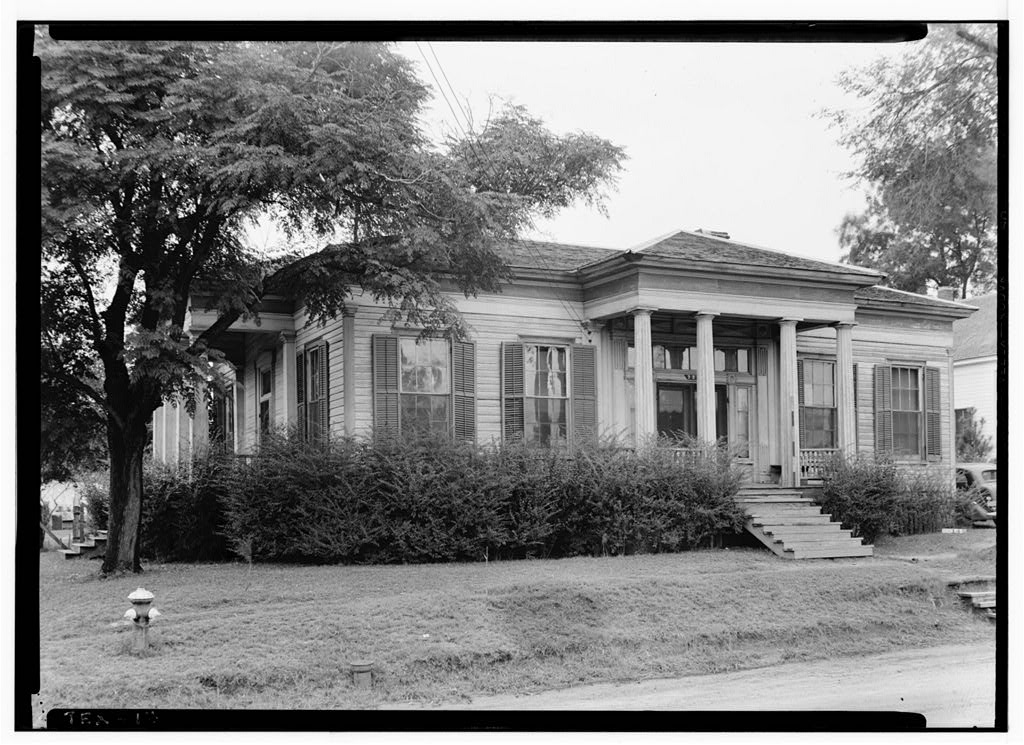
- Presbyterian Manse in 1936

- Location within Texas Location within the United States
- Location: NE corner of Alley and Delta Sts., Jefferson, Texas
- Coordinates: 32°45′27″N 94°21′3″W
- Area: less than one acre
- Built: 1839
- Architectural style: Greek Revival
- NRHP reference No.: 69000211
- RTHL No.: 8068, 15534

Significant dates
- Added to NRHP: October 28, 1969
- Designated RTHL: 1966

The Presbyterian Manse is a historic church parsonage at the northeast corner of Alley and Delta Streets in Jefferson, Texas.

It was built in 1839 and added to the National Register in 1969.

== See also ==
- National Register of Historic Places listings in Marion County, Texas
- Recorded Texas Historic Landmarks in Marion County
