= Freeman Plantation =

Historic house in Texas, United States

- Freeman Plantation House
- U.S. National Register of Historic Places
- Recorded Texas Historic Landmark
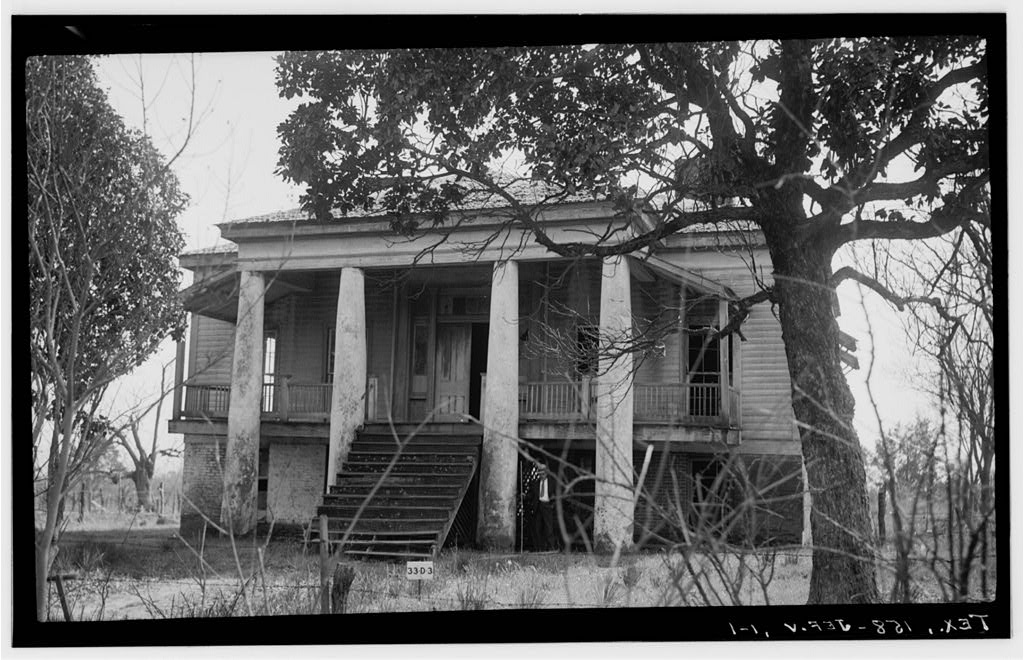
- Freeman Plantation House in 1934

- Location within Texas Location within the United States
- Nearest city: Jefferson, Texas
- Coordinates: 32°45′48″N 94°22′12″W
- Area: 9 acres (3.6 ha)
- Architectural style: Greek Revival
- NRHP reference No.: 69000209
- RTHL No.: 8041

Significant dates
- Added to NRHP: November 25, 1969
- Designated RTHL: 1965

The Freeman Plantation is a Southern plantation with a historic mansion located in Jefferson, Texas, USA. The house was designed in the Greek Revival architectural style, and it was completed in 1850. It has been listed on the National Register of Historic Places since November 25, 1969. It was purchased by the Daughters of the American Revolution in 1971.

== See also ==
- National Register of Historic Places listings in Marion County, Texas
- Recorded Texas Historic Landmarks in Marion County
