= Rose Hill (Port Arthur, Texas) =

Historic house in Texas, United States

- U.S. National Register of Historic Places
- Texas State Antiquities Landmark
- Recorded Texas Historic Landmark
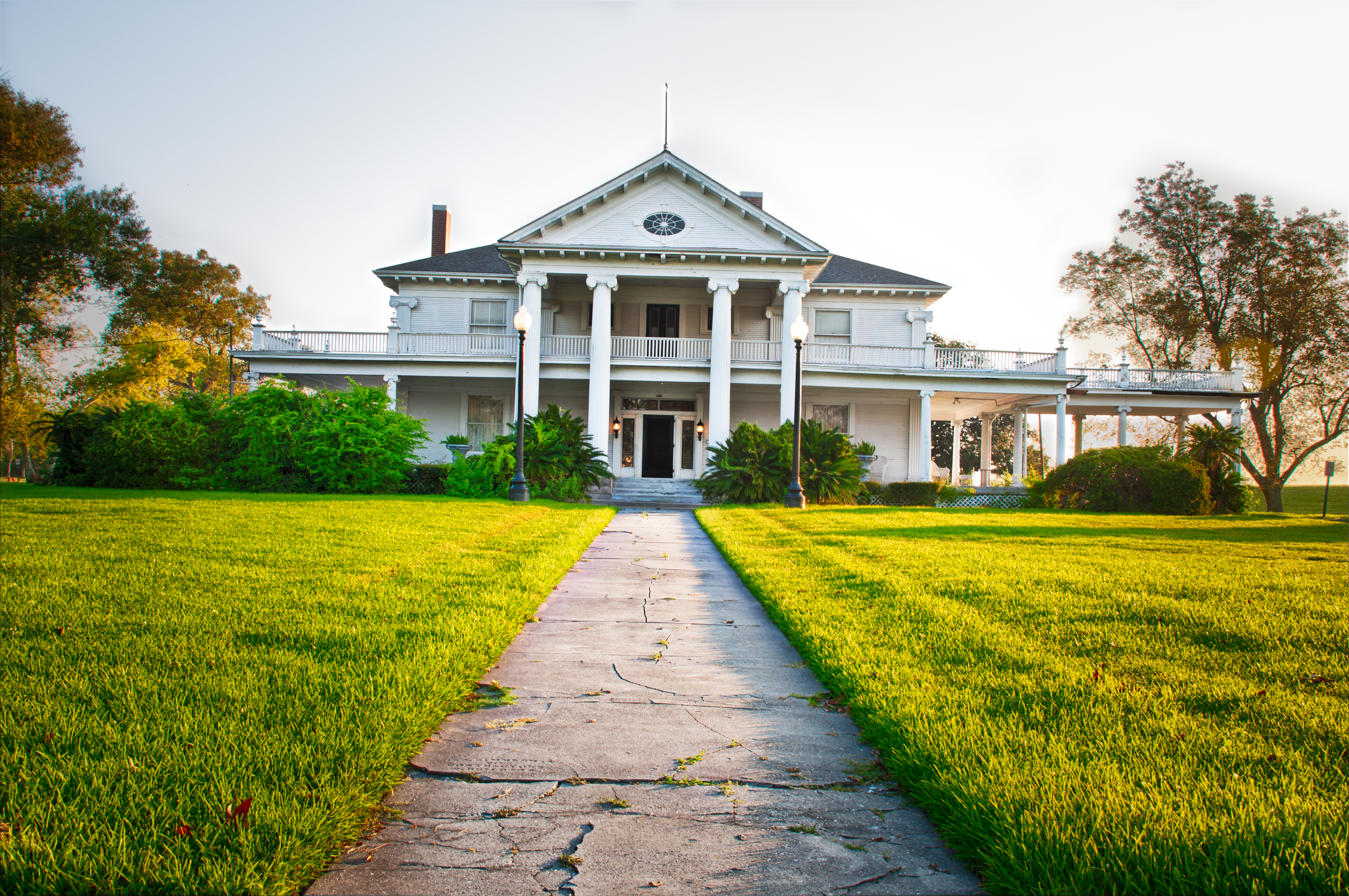
- Rose Hill in 2012

- Location within Texas Location within the United States
- Interactive map showing the location of Rose Hill
- Location: 100 Woodworth Blvd, Port Arthur, Texas
- Coordinates: 29°53′24″N 93°54′54″W
- Area: 11.9 acres (4.8 ha)
- Built: 1905
- Architect: J.H. Baxter
- Architectural style: Classical Revival
- NRHP reference No.: 79002986
- TSAL No.: 8200000396
- RTHL No.: 10582, 10583

Significant dates
- Added to NRHP: October 31, 1979
- Designated TSAL: January 1, 1981
- Designated RTHL: 1978

Rose Hill is a historic mansion in Port Arthur, Texas. It was built in 1906 for Rome Hatch Woodworth, who served as the mayor of Rose Hill. It was listed on the National Register of Historic Places in 1979.

== See also ==
- National Register of Historic Places listings in Jefferson County, Texas
- Recorded Texas Historic Landmarks in Jefferson County
