= Tubbs–Carlisle House =

Historic house in Texas, United States

- U.S. National Register of Historic Places
- Recorded Texas Historic Landmark
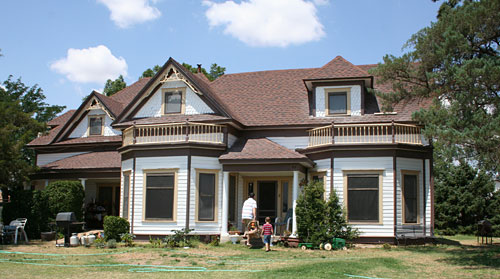
- Tubbs–Carlisle House

- Location within Texas Location within the United States
- Location: 602 Fulton Ave. Lubbock, Texas
- Coordinates: 33°35′23″N 101°56′35″W
- Area: 2.7 acres (1.1 ha)
- Built: 1908
- Architectural style: Queen Anne
- NRHP reference No.: 90001719
- RTHL No.: 12723

Significant dates
- Added to NRHP: November 2, 1990
- Designated RTHL: 2002

Tubbs–Carlisle House, or Tubbs House, or Tubbs/Revier House, is a historic house in Lubbock, Texas. It was named for Isham Tubbs and his wife, Texana Tubbs (née Carlisle), who were early settlers in what is today Lubbock.

== Construction ==
Isham and Texana Tubbs began to think of caring for Texana's sister, Lizzie Spikes Carlisle, who had cared for the sisters' mother, Lucinda Pelts Carter Spikes, until her death at age 85 in 1902. This called for the sale of developed homesteads in Wolfforth, Texas and a move 10 miles across the prairie onto 1 1/2 sections adjoining W. A.'Gus' Carlisle's homesite.

The timber for use in construction of this house was cut from trees selected by Isham while on a return trip to their prior home in Kaufman County, Texas some 500 miles to the east. After milling, the lumber was railed to Colorado City, Childress and Amarillo, Texas, as the railway neared Lubbock, and hauled to the site from those railheads by horse and wagon. There it cured onsite until construction was begun in 1907 and finished in 1908.

The house was modeled after one found in a catalog fancied by Texana. As the house began to take shape in framing, Gus and Lizzie helped with the addition on the north side of a smaller quarters for their own home. The design uses pier and beam Queen Anne Styling, from the end of the Victorian Era. It has 1':1' pitch roofs, numerous cupolas, "fish scaling" gables with "Gingerbread" scroll work, and extensive curved and squared porches on front and a squared porch on back.

The home has served as a residence for descendants of Isham and Texanna Tubbs since their return around 1910 from Mexico at the outbreak of the Mexican Revolution. Descendants of the Tubbs gathered in the yards and under the trees and porches of the Tubbs House for a family reunion in summer 2011. The house is one of the last Queen Anne home in the area.

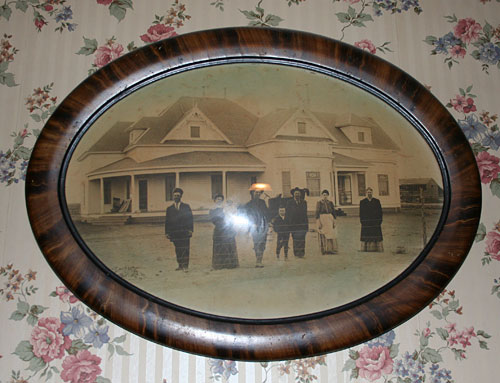
.

== See also ==
- National Register of Historic Places listings in Lubbock County, Texas
- Recorded Texas Historic Landmarks in Lubbock County
