= Carlock Building =

Historic office building in Lubbock, Texas

- U.S. National Register of Historic Places
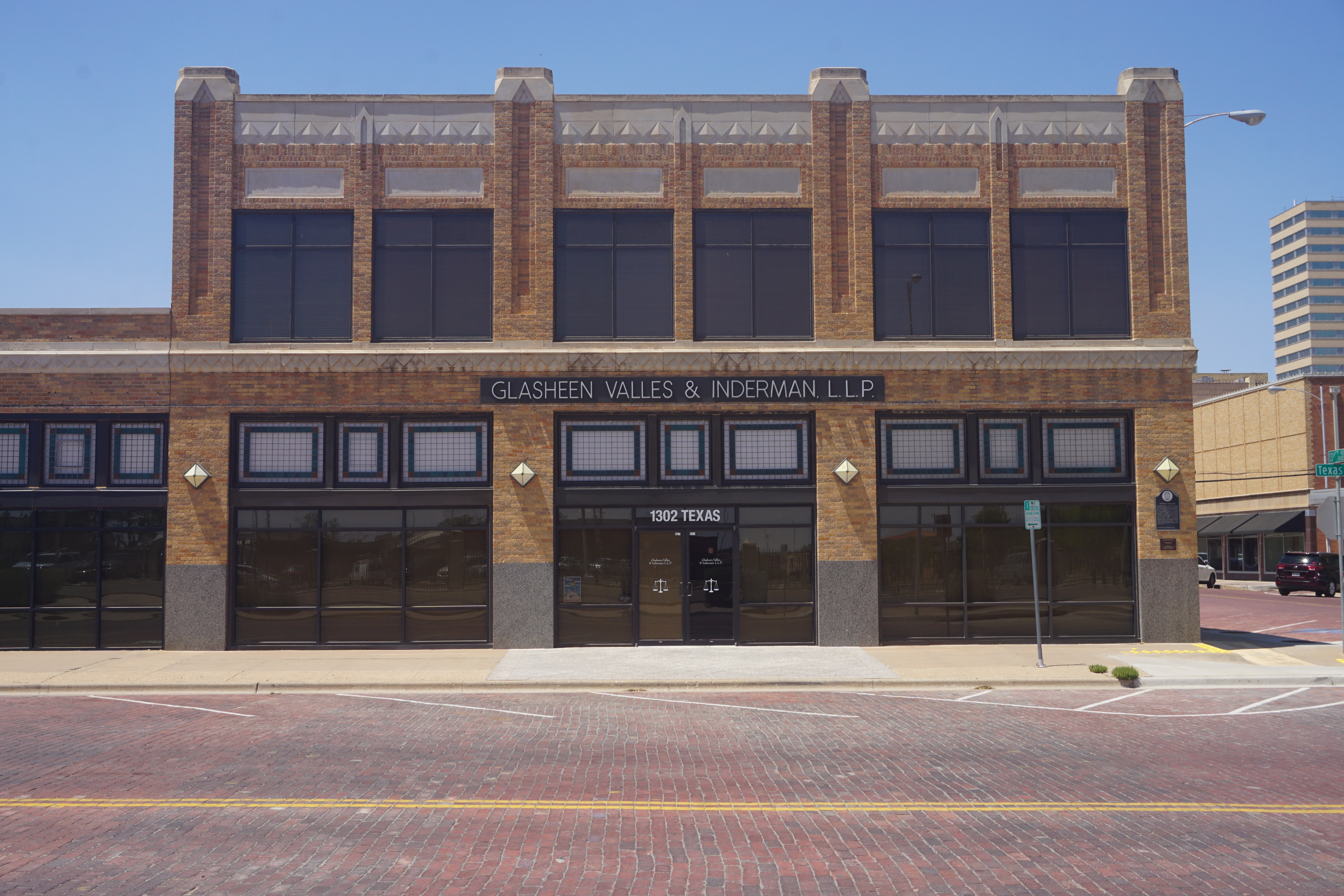
- Carlock Building, east side

- Location within Texas Location within the United States
- Location: 1001-1013 13th St., Lubbock, Texas
- Coordinates: 33°35′0″N 101°50′45″W
- Area: less than one acre
- Built: 1930
- Architect: J.B. Davies and Co.
- Architectural style: Art Deco
- NRHP reference No.: 04000767
- Added to NRHP: July 28, 2004

The Carlock Building, 1001 – 1013 13th Street, Lubbock, Texas is an office building designed in the Art Deco style by J. B. Davies & Company of Fort Worth, Texas. It was constructed in 1930 as a cotton exchange for J. D. Doughty and J. B. Kerby. The building reflected the importance of cotton in the region and the growth of peripheral industries.

Cotton merchandising firms headed by Charles Paul Carlock and Watson have continuously occupied this building since its construction. The Carlock Building has been listed on the National Register of Historic Places.

The building currently houses law offices of Glasheen, Valles and Inderman L.L.P. - Personal Injury Attorneys.

== See also ==
- National Register of Historic Places listings in Lubbock County, Texas
