= First National Bank Building (Jayton, Texas) =

- U.S. National Register of Historic Places
- Recorded Texas Historic Landmark
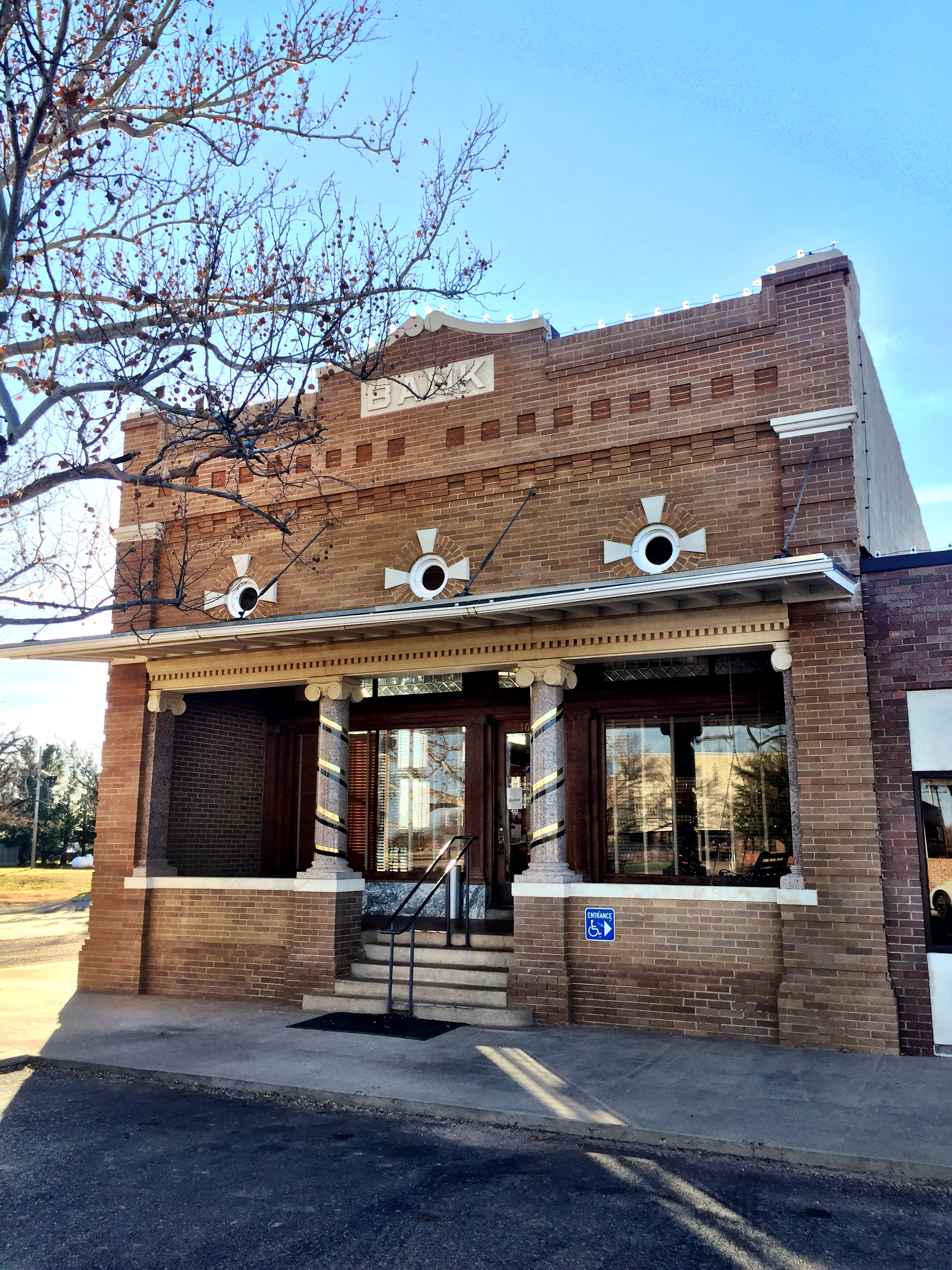
- First National Bank Building in 2016

- Location within Texas Location within the United States
- Location: 102 N. Donoho St., Jayton, Texas
- Coordinates: 33°14′52″N 100°34′27″W
- Area: less than one acre
- Built: 1912
- Architect: R.H. Stuckey
- Architectural style: Classical Revival, Enframed Block
- NRHP reference No.: 97001209
- RTHL No.: 11993

Significant dates
- Added to NRHP: September 30, 1997
- Designated RTHL: 1997

The First National Bank Building at 402 Donoho St. in Jayton, Texas was built in 1912. It was listed on the National Register of Historic Places in 1997.

It is a Classical Revival-style building with brick veneer and masonry bearing walls on a concrete foundation. It also served as the Kent County Courthouse in 1955.

It was designed by architect Rockwell Henry Stuckey (1855–1936).

It is also a Recorded Texas Historic Landmark.

== See also ==
- National Register of Historic Places listings in Kent County, Texas
- Recorded Texas Historic Landmarks in Kent County
