= Old United States Post Office and Courts Building (Jefferson, Texas) =

- Old U.S. Post Office and Courts Building
- U.S. National Register of Historic Places
- Recorded Texas Historic Landmark
- Federal building in 2014

- Location within Texas Location within the United States
- Interactive map showing the location for The Old U.S Post Office and Courts Building, Jefferson
- Location: 223 W. Austin St., Jefferson, Texas
- Coordinates: 32°45′20″N 94°20′45″W
- Area: less than one acre
- Built by: James H. Caster
- Architect: William A. Ferret
- Architectural style: Romanesque Revival, Greek Revival
- Website: Jefferson Historical Society Museum
- NRHP reference No.: 69000210
- RTHL No.: 8034

Significant dates
- Added to NRHP: October 28, 1969
- Designated RTHL: 1966

The Old U.S. Post Office and Courts Building is a historical 19th century brick government building, located in Jefferson, Marion County, Texas.

The building now houses the Jefferson Historical Museum. It was listed on the National Register of Historic Places in 1969.

== History ==
Construction on the Romanesque Revival building with Greek Revival details started in 1888, and was completed by 1890.

It originally served as a courthouse of the United States District Court for the Eastern District of Texas, and as a U.S. post office.

The post office was on the first floor, the court was on the second.

The building was purchased by the Jefferson Historical Society for use as a museum in 1965.

== See also ==
- National Register of Historic Places listings in Marion County, Texas
- Recorded Texas Historic Landmarks in Marion County
