= Texas Technological College Dairy Barn =

- U.S. National Register of Historic Places
- Recorded Texas Historic Landmark
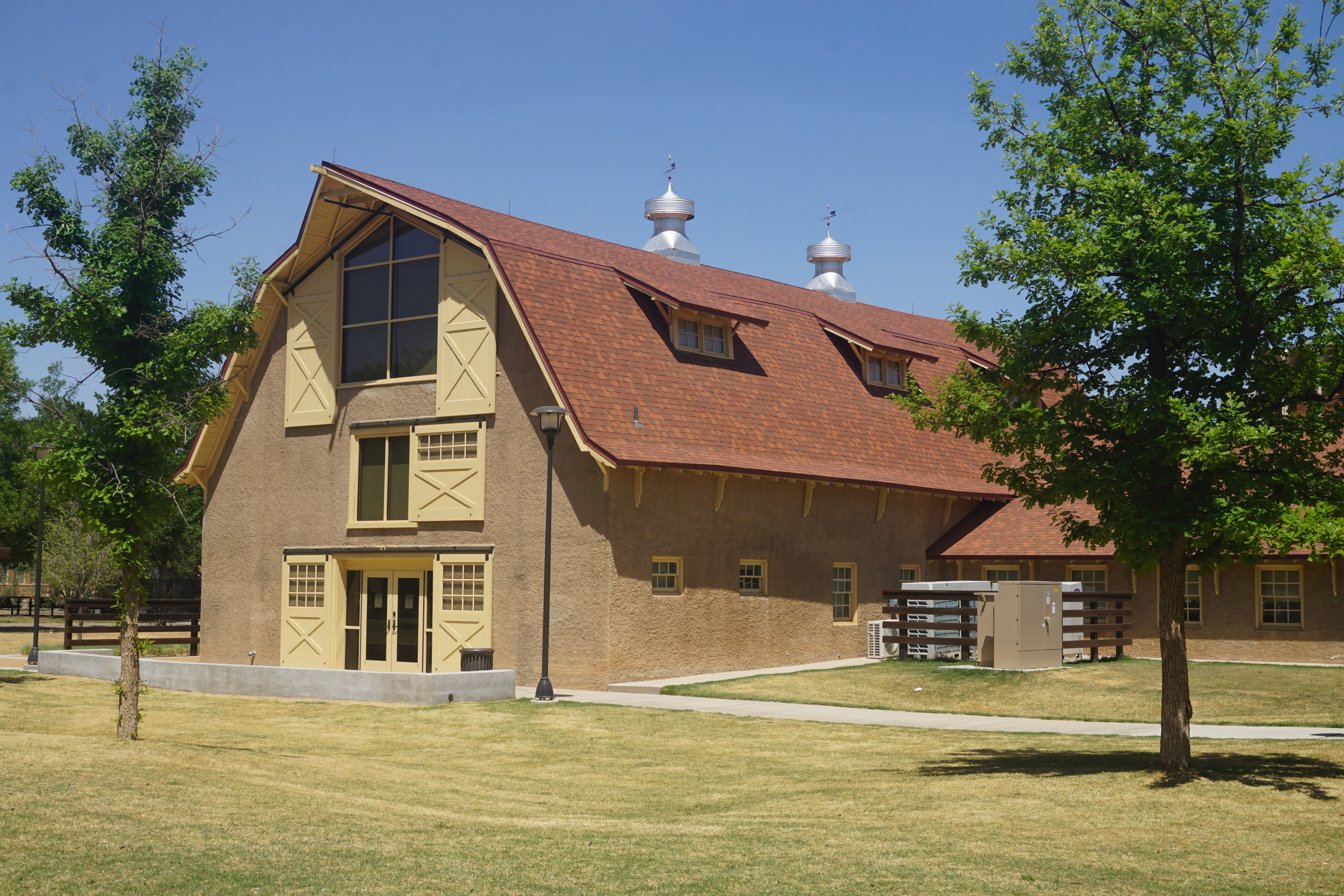
- Dairy barn

- Location within Texas Location within the United States
- Location: Texas Tech University campus, Lubbock, Texas
- Coordinates: 33°34′53″N 101°52′40″W
- Area: less than one acre
- Built: 1927
- Architect: Wyatt Hedrick; Sanguinet, Staats & Hedrick
- Architectural style: Bungalow/Craftsman, Barn
- NRHP reference No.: 92000336
- RTHL No.: 18313

Significant dates
- Added to NRHP: April 2, 1992
- Designated RTHL: 2016

The Texas Technological College Dairy Barn, located on the Texas Tech University campus in Lubbock, Texas, was constructed from 1926–27 and served as a teaching facility for 40 years. The building was designed by architect W. C. Hedrick of Fort Worth, Texas, with assistance from Agricultural Dean A. H. Leidigh and Professor W. L. Stangel.

Until 1935, students would bring their own cows to campus and market their own milk products through the Student Dairy Association. After 1927, the Dairy Manufacturers department sold milk and ice cream to Lubbock residents and college cafeterias. The university moved its dairy facility elsewhere in 1967 and abandoned the dairy barn.

From 1990 through 1992, students raised funds to preserve the barn as a symbol of Texas Tech's agricultural roots. The building was added to the National Register of Historic Places in 1992.

On October 16, 2020, Texas Tech unveiled renovations to the barn, which was made possible with a $3.5 million restoration project announced in 2017.

It has a hay hood.

== See also ==
- National Register of Historic Places listings in Lubbock County, Texas
- Recorded Texas Historic Landmarks in Lubbock County
