= Idle Hours =

Historic house in Texas, United States

- U.S. National Register of Historic Places
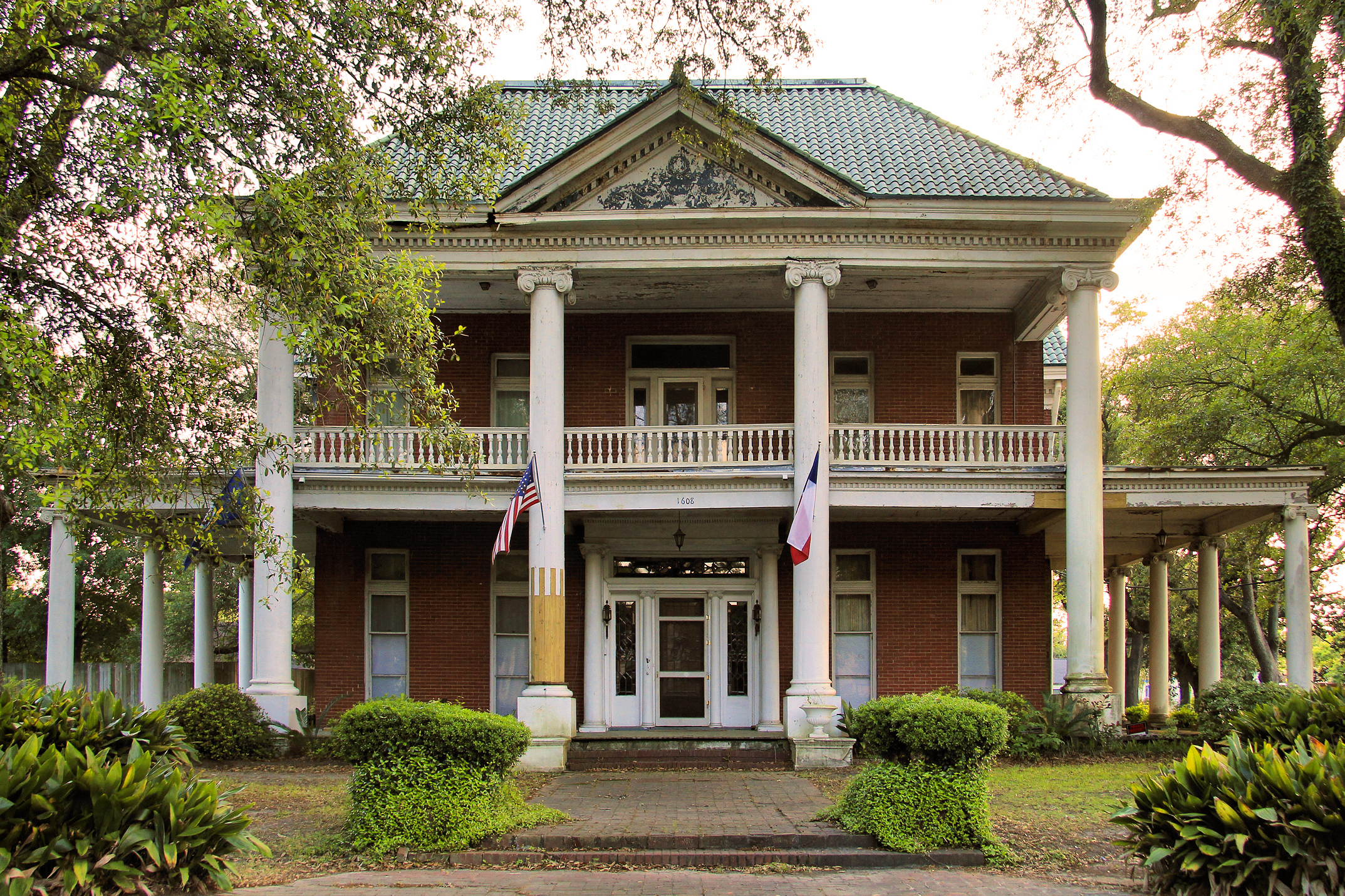
- Idle Hours in 2014

- Location within Texas Location within the United States
- Location: 1608 Orange St., Beaumont, Texas
- Coordinates: 30°04′07″N 94°05′57″W
- Area: 1 acre (0.40 ha)
- Built: 1903
- Architect: Frank Tipton Smith
- Architectural style: Classical Revival
- NRHP reference No.: 78002961
- Added to NRHP: May 22, 1978

The house nicknamed "Idle Hours" was built in 1903 by architect Frank T. Smith for L.P. Ogden and his wife Cynthia. Because the house was considered to be out in the country at the time of its construction, Mrs. Ogden preferred to retain her town home and named her new country estate "Idle Hours". The house was added to the National Register of Historic Places in 1978.

The home was owned by several prominent Beaumont families. In 1970 it was donated to Land Manor, a non-profit organization which subsequently converted the residence into a halfway house to help people return to society. In 2002 it once again became a private residence of the Bienvenu family and continues to be known by the many locals as "Bienvenu Manor". The Bienvenu family continues to do extensive renovations to restore the carriage house, servant's quarters and the large main house.

== See also ==
- National Register of Historic Places listings in Jefferson County, Texas
