= William M. McFaddin =

William M. McFaddin (c. 1819–1898) served in the Texas Revolution at San Jacinto. He founded a ranching empire in southeast Texas that survives today. William P.H. Mcfaddin, James Alfred McFaddin, David H. McFaddin, John Andrew McFaddin, and Charles Walter McFaddin were his sons, and Eliza Ann (Di) McFaddin, and Elizabeth (Lizzie) McFaddin, were his daughters.
