= McFaddin–Ward House =

Historic house in Texas, United States

- McFaddin House Complex
- U.S. National Register of Historic Places
- Recorded Texas Historic Landmark
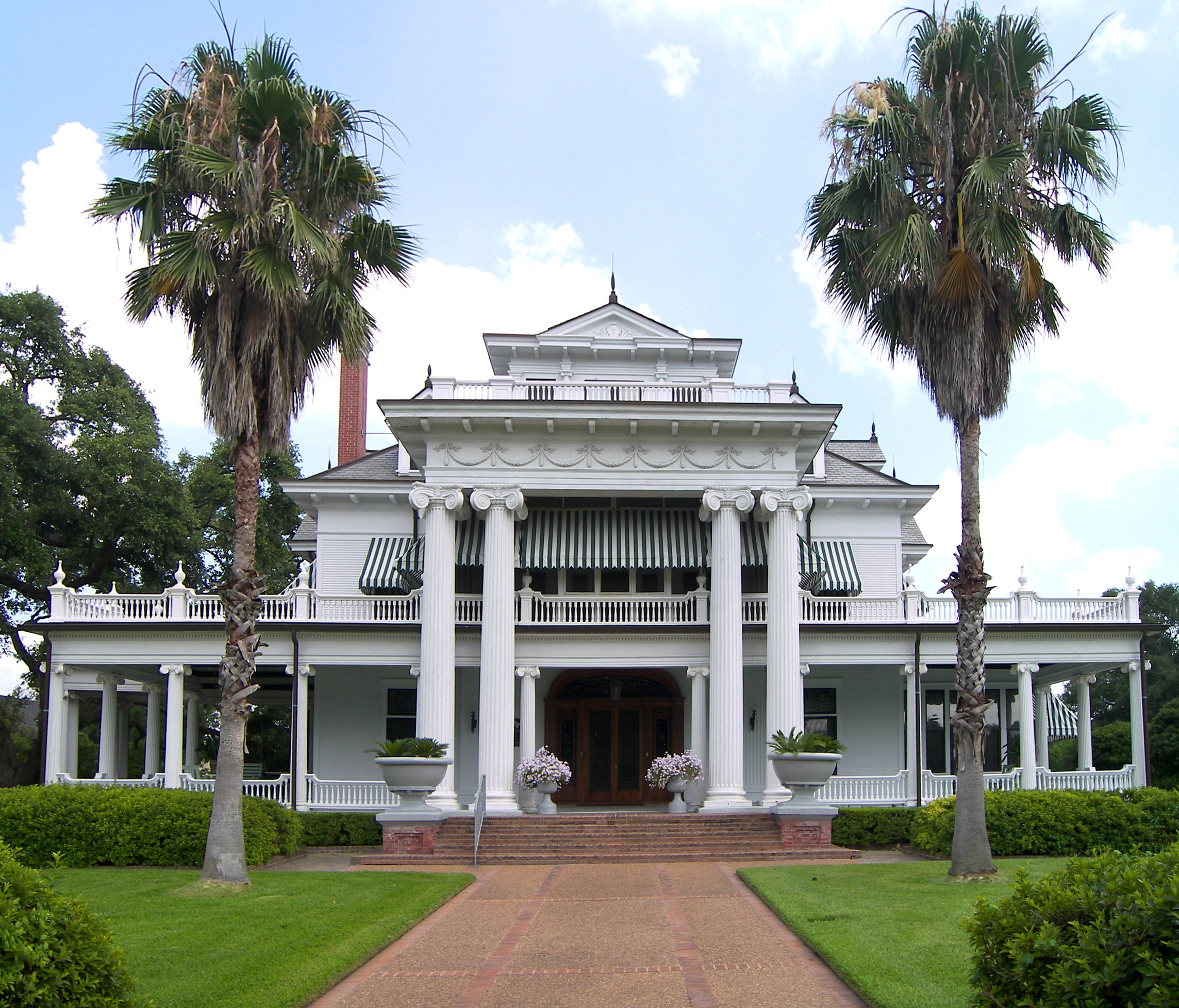
- McFaddin–Ward House in 2007

- Location within Texas Location within the United States
- Location: 1906 McFaddin St., Beaumont, Texas
- Coordinates: 30°5′15″N 94°6′54″W
- Area: 9.9 acres (4.0 ha)
- Built: 1906
- Architect: Henry Conrad Mauer
- Architectural style: Classical Revival
- Website: The McFaddin-Ward House
- NRHP reference No.: 71000942
- RTHL No.: 10542

Significant dates
- Added to NRHP: January 25, 1971
- Designated RTHL: 1976

The McFaddin–Ward House is a historic home in Beaumont, Texas, United States built in 1905 1906 in the Beaux-Arts Colonial Revival style. The 12,800-square-foot (1,190 m^{2}) house and furnishings reflect the lifestyle of the prominent family who lived in the house for seventy-five years. The house was added to the National Register of Historic Places in 1971.

Di Vernon Averill commissioned architect Henry Conrad Mauer to build the house, which was sold the next year to Di's brother, William P.H. McFaddin. McFaddin and his wife Ida Caldwell McFaddin, from Huntington, West Virginia, moved into the house in 1907 with their three children: Mamie, age 11, Perry Jr., age 9, and James Lewis Caldwell, age 6.

A substantial carriage house was added in the same year. The carriage house had a stable, hayloft, garage, gymnasium, and staff quarters. When the McFaddins' daughter Mamie married Carroll Ward in 1919, the newlyweds moved in with the McFaddins and lived their entire married lives there.

Before Mamie McFaddin Ward died in 1982, she created a foundation to preserve the house as a museum which opened to the public in 1986. Today, the McFaddin–Ward House Museum offers free guided tours of the Historic Home, Carriage House, and Gardens, led by volunteer docents Tuesday through Sunday. Two options for tours are available during operating hours: 1) McFaddin–Ward House Tours, which include three floors of the Historic Home, Carriage House, and Gardens and are open to ages eight and up. 2) Carriage House and Garden Tours, which are open to all ages.The museum recommends booking tours online, but walk-ins are still welcome.

Outside the home are spacious lawns, flower beds and rose gardens. Inside, a substantial permanent collection of antique furniture and household items are displayed throughout three floors. The McFaddin–Ward House is one of the few house museums in which the home's original furnishings are intact and on display. It is also one of the few Beaux-Arts Colonial Revival homes still open to the public. New exhibits and displays are changed often, giving fresh interpretations of the home.

In addition to tours, the museum hosts community events and educational programs. Educational programs focus on a range of topics and are geared toward children and adults. The museum hosts lectures, music events on the lawn, summer camps, and seasonal celebrations. The holiday season is celebrated with an annual open house that features beautiful holiday decorations throughout the first floor of the house, live music, and children's activities.

In addition, it was named a Texas State Historic Landmark in 1976. The home has been featured various TV's Arts & Entertainment's America's Castles as a Lone Star Estate (only 3 Texas homes were featured), and the house has been included in several important architectural books.

== See also ==
- National Register of Historic Places listings in Jefferson County, Texas
- Recorded Texas Historic Landmarks in Jefferson County
