= William Perry Herring McFaddin =

Perry McFaddin
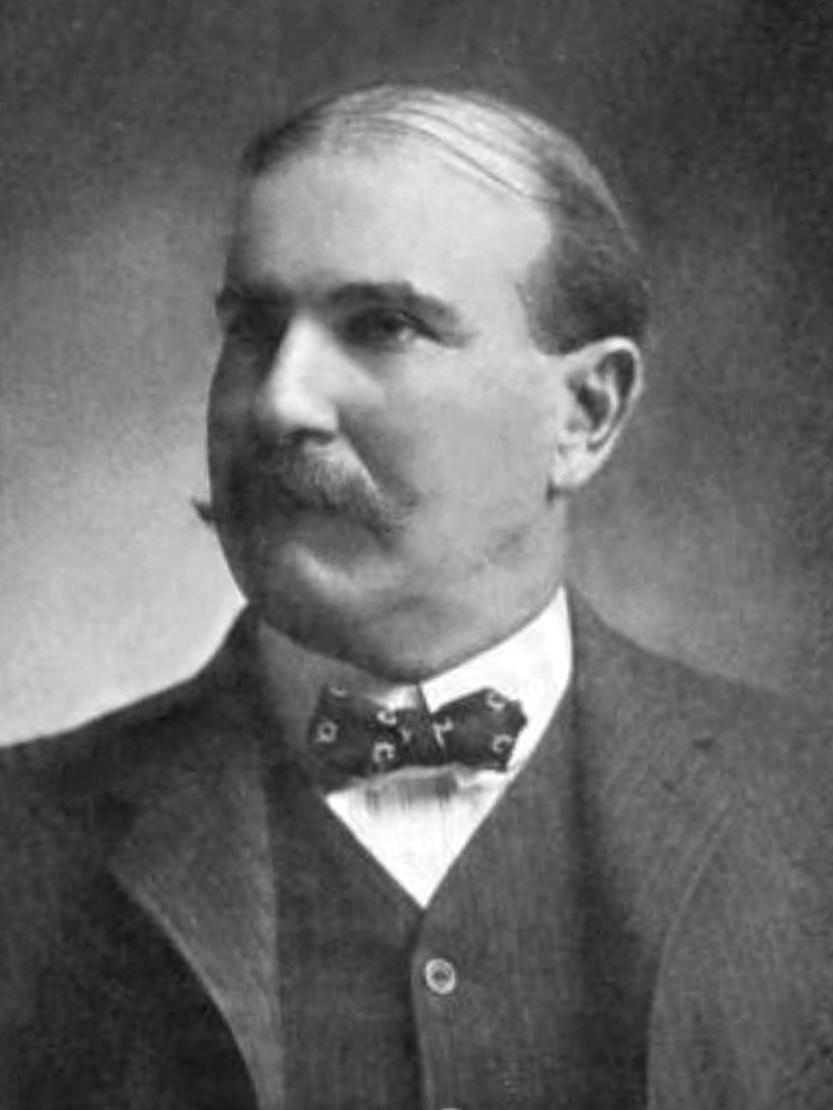
- Born: 1856; Jefferson County, Texas
- Died: 1935 (aged 78–79); Jefferson County, Texas
- Resting place: Magnolia Cemetery, Beaumont
- Occupation: Rancher

William Perry Herring McFaddin (1856–1935), known as Perry, was a rancher and early landowner in the early years of Beaumont, Texas. Under William McFaddin, the McFaddin Ranches of Beaumont reached their greatest extent. The Spindletop oil gusher was located on land leased from McFaddin. The site of Port Arthur, Texas, was purchased from McFaddin by Arthur Edward Stilwell. Former pieces of the McFaddin Ranches now make up Sea Rim State Park, the McFaddin National Wildlife Refuge, and the J.D. Murphree Wildlife Management Area. The McFaddin-Ward House was erected on his homestead and is listed in the National Register of Historic Places.
