= List of Recorded Texas Historic Landmarks (Hunt-Martin) =

The following is a partial list of Recorded Texas Historic Landmarks (RTHLs) arranged by county as designated by the Texas Historical Commission and local county historical commissions in Texas. This page includes RTHLs in the following counties: Hunt, Hutchinson, Irion, Jack, Jackson, Jasper, Jeff Davis, Jefferson, Jim Hogg, Jim Wells, Johnson, Jones, Karnes, Kaufman, Kendall, Kenedy, Kent, Kerr, Kimble, King, Kinney, Kleberg, Knox, La Salle, Lamar, Lamb, Lampasas, Lavaca, Lee, Leon, Liberty, Limestone, Lipscomb, Live Oak, Llano, Loving, Lubbock, Lynn, Madison, Marion, and Martin.

Recorded Texas Historic Landmarks listed by county
Anderson-Callahan • Cameron-Duval • Eastland-Gray • Grayson-Hudspeth • Hunt-Martin • Mason-Rusk • Sabine-Travis • Trinity-Zavala

KEY

Landmarks with multiple historic designations are colored according to their highest designation within the following hierarchy.

⁕ Listed individually on the National Register of Historic Places (NRHP) as a National Historic Landmark
⁂ Listed on the NRHP as a contributing property of a National Historic Landmark District
† Listed individually on the NRHP
‡ Listed as a contributing property of an NRHP Historic District
§ Listed individually as or as part of a State Historic Site
# Listed individually as or as part of a State Antiquities Landmark

== Hunt County ==
Registered Texas Historic Landmark	Image	Marker number	Physical address	Nearest city	Year designated	Description
Bourland-Stevens-Samuell House		7773	1916 Stonewall St. 33°8′37″N 96°6′27″W	Greenville	1969	
Central Christian Church (Disciples of Christ)†	More images	7776	2611 Wesley St. 33°8′19″N 96°6′30″W	Greenville	1989	
Commerce Post Office	More images	7782	1210 Park St. 33°15′1″N 95°53′53″W	Commerce	1991	Commerce Public Library
Douglass School		17939	1301 Morse St. 33°8′3″N 96°5′45″W	Greenville	2014	
Gen. Hal C. Horton Home		7804	3925 Moulton St. 33°7′44″N 96°5′53″W	Greenville	1969	
Germany House		12090	3403 Lee St. 33°8′23″N 96°6′53″W	Greenville	1999	
Hunt County Courthouse, 1929†	More images	7823	2507 Lee St. 33°8′22″N 96°6′23″W	Greenville	1994	
Kavanaugh Methodist Church		7809	2516 Park St. 33°7′53″N 96°6′26″W	Greenville	1994	
Lone Oak Methodist Church		14123	218 Main St. 32°59′48″N 95°56′32″W	Lone Oak	1988	
President's House†	More images	12091	NW corner Stonewall St. at Campbell St. 33°14′33″N 95°54′18″W	Commerce	1997	Stonewall St., between Bryan and Bois D'Arc, Texas A&M University
W. R. J. Camp House†	More images	7774	2620 Church St. 33°8′34″N 96°6′27″W	Greenville	1987	

== Hutchinson County ==
Registered Texas Historic Landmark	Image	Marker number	Physical address	Nearest city	Year designated	Description
Ace Borger Home		77	829 N. Hedgecoke St. 35°40′31″N 101°23′33″W	Borger	1976	829 N. Hedgecoke, Borger
East Ward Elementary School		16744	200 E. 9th St. 35°40′33″N 101°23′18″W	Borger	2011	Northeast corner of Ninth and Harvey Streets
Girl Scout Little House		15271	119 N. McGee St. 35°39′59″N 101°23′41″W	Borger	2008	119 N. McGee
Holt School		2515	NW corner FM 281 at CR 22 36°1′24″N 101°13′51″W	Stinnett	1989	16 mi. NE of stinnett on SH 207, then 5.9 mi. E on FM 281
Hutchinson County Courthouse†		2602	500 Main St. 35°49′39″N 101°26′32″W	Stinnett	1995	S.H. 207, Courthouse Square, Stinnett
Isaac McCormick Cottage, "Birthplace of Hutchinson County"		2	N side 100 blk E. 5th St. 35°49′42″N 101°26′32″W	Stinnett	1967	North side of Courthouse Square, SH 207 - Stinnett
Plemons Bridge	More images	15709	Plemons Rd. over Canadian River 35°44′51″N 101°20′49″W	Borger	2009	

== Irion County ==
Registered Texas Historic Landmark	Image	Marker number	Physical address	Nearest city	Year designated	Description
Barnhart Cowboy Church		258	SE corner 5th St. and Draper St. 31°7′44″N 101°10′27″W	Barnhart	1981	corner of 5th St. and Draper
Mertzon Central School		3169	302 N. 3rd St. 31°15′36″N 100°49′24″W	Mertzon	1962	corner of Juanita and Third; marker is inside the school library

== Jack County ==
Registered Texas Historic Landmark	Image	Marker number	Physical address	Nearest city	Year designated	Description
First Methodist Church, Jermyn, Texas		1778	First St. at S. Wise St. 33°15′36″N 98°23′31″W	Jermyn	1968	Corner of S. Wise and 1st streets
First National Bank		1600	101 N. Main St. 33°13′7″N 98°9′33″W	Jacksboro	1969	US 281 at US 380, west side of courthouse square
Former Gulf, Texas & Western Railroad Depot		1947	302 S. Main St. 33°12′55″N 98°9′33″W	Jacksboro	1968	
Fort Richardson Cavalry Post Hospital, 1867⁕†§#	More images	2010	W side of parade ground at Ft. Richardson 33°12′27″N 98°9′52″W	Jacksboro	1965	Fort Richardson State Historical Park
Fort Richardson Hotel	More images	2011	101 S. Main St. 33°13′5″N 98°9′33″W	Jacksboro	1967	US 281 and US 380, southwest corner of courthouse square
Jacksboro's First Railroad Depot	More images	2700	S end of Depot St. at Ft. Richardson park boundary 33°12′29″N 98°9′40″W	Jacksboro	1974	at end of Depot Street, at east gate of Fort Richardson State Historical Park
Officers' Quarters⁕†§#	More images	3674	S side of parade ground at Ft. Richardson 33°12′23″N 98°9′44″W	Jacksboro	1964	Fort Richardson State Historical Park
Old Hess Building		3743	102 N. Church St. 33°13′6″N 98°9′26″W	Jacksboro	1967	southeast corner of the square

== Jackson County ==
Registered Texas Historic Landmark	Image	Marker number	Physical address	Nearest city	Year designated	Description
Branch and Bonnot House		488	CR 440 E of SH 172 28°53′22″N 96°27′54″W	Edna	1965	from Edna, take SH 111 East about 9 miles, then go south on FM 172 about 3.75 mile go E on gravel road CR 440 (first house on W side of street)
Dr. Bronaugh-Hasdorff Home		1263	203 E. Brackenridge St. 28°58′36″N 96°38′33″W	Edna	1967	203 E Breckenridge St., Edna
Dutart-McDowell Home		1307	403 N. Wells St. 28°58′49″N 96°38′55″W	Edna	1967	Texana Museum, 403 Wells St., Edna
George F. Horton Home		2151	404 Hanover St. 28°58′27″N 96°38′42″W	Edna	1966	404 Hanover St., Edna
Killough Home		2940	403 N. Wells St. 28°58′49″N 96°38′55″W	Edna	1966	403 Wells St., Texana Museum, Edna
La Bauve-Young-Payne Home		2992	112 E. Brackenridge St. 28°58′36″N 96°38′36″W	Edna	1967	112 E. Brackenridge St., Edna
Meriwether-Simons-Farquhar House		3345	801 S. Allen St. 28°58′10″N 96°38′31″W	Edna	1968	801 S. Allen ST., Edna
Old J. C. Traylor Place		2670	403 N. Wells St. 28°58′49″N 96°38′55″W	Edna	1964	Texana Museum, 403 Wells St.
Old Morales Store		3770	10191 SH 111 29°6′28″N 96°44′45″W	Morales	1967	Hwy. 111, 1 mile S of Morales
Texana Presbyterian Church†		5238	Brackenridge Pkwy., Brackenridge Recreation Complex at Lake Texana 28°56′36″N 96°32′20″W	Edna	1981	FM 1822/510, S. Apollo Dr., Edna (near SE city limits)
Ward-Coates Home		5717	6 mi. S on SH 172 28°45′5″N 96°27′11″W	La Ward	1965	From La Ward, take US 172 S. about 6 miles, then go E over cattle guard about .3 miles - house is visible from road.

== Jasper County ==
Registered Texas Historic Landmark	Image	Marker number	Physical address	Nearest city	Year designated	Description
Andrew F. Smyth Home†		10464	0.9 mi. N of FM 2799 on CR 101 30°56′7″N 94°8′39″W	Jasper	1965	8 mi. W Jasper SH63 to FM 1747 to Bevilport Rd. Turn at first road. .9 mi to "Smyth's Landing"
Beaty-Orton House†#		10433	206 S. Main St. 30°55′8″N 93°59′58″W	Jasper	1976	
Belle-Jim Hotel		11941	160 N. Austin St. 30°55′18″N 93°59′57″W	Jasper	1999	
Bridges House†		10436	1 mi. N of FM 2254 on CR 434 30°48′17″N 93°54′51″W	Roganville	1966	take FM 2254 W to Rockhill Rd. N about 1 mi.
Hardy Pace Home		10461			1965	
R. C. Doom House†		10441	7602 FM 2799 30°55′25″N 94°7′27″W	Jasper	1965	on FM 2799 about 9 mi. W of Jasper near junction of FM 2799 and FM 1747
Waggoner-Scarborough Home		10466	731 N. Main St. 30°55′39″N 94°0′4″W	Jasper	1986	

== Jeff Davis County ==
Registered Texas Historic Landmark	Image	Marker number	Physical address	Nearest city	Year designated	Description
First Rural School West of Pecos River	More images	10477	SH 118 11 mi. SE of Fort Davis 30°31′12″N 103°46′8″W	Fort Davis	1967	take SH 118 SE approx. 11 miles to ROW
Fort Davis United Methodist Church		17051	200 S. Front St. 30°35′16″N 103°53′45″W	Fort Davis	1962	Front Street & Woodward Ave.
Grierson-Sproul House†		18381	901 Court Ave. 30°35′26″N 103°54′17″W	Fort Davis	2016	
Jeff Davis County Courthouse†#	More images	12368	100 Court Ave. 30°35′18″N 103°53′42″W	Fort Davis	2000	at the intersection of SH 17 and SH 118 in Fort Davis
Jeff Davis County Jail		16485	100 Woodward Ave. 30°35′17″N 103°53′42″W	Fort Davis	2010	Fort Davis, 100 West Woodward Avenue
Smith-Carlton Adobe House		17533	940 S. Front St. 30°34′37″N 103°53′47″W	Fort Davis	2013	
Trueheart, Henry M. and Annie V., House†	More images	10488	804 Court Ave. 30°35′20″N 103°54′8″W	Fort Davis	1964	4 blocks S of Courthouse Square; corner of 7th and Court St.
Union Mercantile	More images	10489	100 Memorial Sq. 30°35′20″N 103°53′37″W	Fort Davis	1965	N of the Courthouse Square

== Jefferson County ==
Registered Texas Historic Landmark	Image	Marker number	Physical address	Nearest city	Year designated	Description
Boudreaux House		14513	10714 E. Clubb Rd. 29°56′11″N 94°14′56″W	Fannett	1966	.5 mi. E of SH 124 on Broussard Cemetery Rd., S of Fannett
Caroline Gilbert Hinchee House†		10534	1814 Park St. 30°4′12″N 94°5′38″W	Beaumont	1982	
Central Fire Station		10498	400 Walnut St. 30°5′10″N 94°5′55″W	Beaumont	1983	
Clubhouse of the Federated Women's Clubs of Port Arthur†		10515	1924 Lakeshore Dr. 29°52′54″N 93°55′22″W	Port Arthur	1982	
David Crockett Middle School (RAZED)		10505	1400 Royal St. 30°4′9″N 94°6′5″W	Beaumont	1984	Building razed 1996.
Dugat-Hamshire House		10510	11916 Dugat Rd. 29°54′51″N 94°15′17″W	Fannett	1974	off SH 124, 12 mi. SW of Beaumont in Fannett
Ellwood-Craig House†		10512	1953 Lakeshore Dr. 29°52′59″N 93°55′22″W	Port Arthur	1973	
First National Bank Building‡	More images	10521	495 Orleans St. 30°4′59″N 94°5′57″W	Beaumont	1989	
French Trading Post†	More images	10527	2995 French Rd. 30°6′36″N 94°8′35″W	Beaumont	1970	
Fuller, Ruby Ruth, Building		15944	300 Stilwell Blvd.Blvd. 29°52′45″N 93°55′35″W	Port Arthur	2009	
Gates Memorial Library†	More images	10530	317 Stilwell Blvd. 29°52′42″N 93°55′38″W	Port Arthur	1981	
Hamshire House		10533	E. Hamshire Rd. E of Gallier Rd. 29°51′33″N 94°17′16″W	Hamshire	1966	
Hebert Home		14837		Beaumont	1965	
Holmes Duke House†		10511	694 Forrest St. 30°5′15″N 94°6′18″W	Beaumont	1986	
Jefferson Theatre†‡	More images	10537	345 Fannin St. 30°4′54″N 94°5′52″W	Beaumont	1978	
McFaddin-Ward House†	More images	10542	1906 McFaddin Ave. 30°5′14″N 94°6′56″W	Beaumont	1976	
Mildred Buildings†	More images	11946	1415, 1425-95 Calder Ave. 30°5′8″N 94°6′36″W	Beaumont	1999	
Morris-Booz-White House		10545	2545 Lakeshore Dr.Blvd. 29°53′14″N 93°55′5″W	Port Arthur	1988	
Pivoto-Robinson House		10552	FM 1009 E of Bonner Rd. 30°1′21″N 94°25′48″W	Nome	1981	off US 1009, .7 mi. south of US 90 in Nome
Saint Anthony's Cathedral	More images	10560	700 Jefferson St. 30°4′40″N 94°6′3″W	Beaumont	1980	
Sanders House†		10561	479 Pine St. 30°5′10″N 94°5′53″W	Beaumont	1982	
South County Office Building		10565	525 Lakeshore Dr. 29°52′14″N 93°55′58″W	Port Arthur	1989	
Texas' First Rice Mill		10576	1800 Pecos St. 30°4′53″N 94°6′48″W	Beaumont	1968	
Tyrrell Public Library‡	More images	10578	695 Pearl St. 30°4′56″N 94°5′48″W	Beaumont	1976	
Vuylstekke House		10579	1831 Lakeshore Dr. 29°52′54″N 93°55′28″W	Port Arthur	1996	
Woodworth House (Rose Hill)†#		10582	100 Woodworth Blvd. 29°53′24″N 93°54′54″W	Port Arthur	1978	
Woodworth House (Rose Hill)†#		10583	100 Woodworth Blvd. 29°53′24″N 93°54′54″W	Port Arthur	1978	

== Jim Hogg County ==
Registered Texas Historic Landmark	Image	Marker number	Physical address	Nearest city	Year designated	Description
Hotel Viggo		2576	205 N. Smith Ave. 27°18′29″N 98°40′43″W	Hebbronville	1983	205 N. Smith Street (SH 16), Hebbronville
New York Store		16538	308 E. Galbraith St. 27°18′24″N 98°40′32″W	Hebbronville	2010	on 306 E. Galbraith St. off Texas Hwy 359 and east of Hwy 16; downtown Hebbronville facing south in the middle of the street
Old Garza Home		6054	602 E. Santa Clara St. 27°18′30″N 98°40′20″W	Hebbronville	1962	602 E. Santa Clara Street, Hebbronville
Randado Catholic Church		4183	County road 0.5 mi. N of SH 16 just E of FM 649 27°4′51″N 98°52′44″W	Hebbronville	1962	from Hebbronville, take SH 16 about 22 miles south to town of Randada - go north about .5 mile on county road to church, Randado

== Jim Wells County ==
Registered Texas Historic Landmark	Image	Marker number	Physical address	Nearest city	Year designated	Description
McGill Brothers Building		3294	66 S. Wright St. 27°44′58″N 98°4′27″W	Alice	1994	66 South Wright Street, Alice

== Johnson County ==
Registered Texas Historic Landmark	Image	Marker number	Physical address	Nearest city	Year designated	Description
Carnegie Library Building†#		731	201 N. Caddo St. 32°20′54″N 97°23′11″W	Cleburne	1981	201 North Caddo Street, Cleburne
Church of the Holy Comforter		860	209 E. Wardville St. 32°20′56″N 97°23′6″W	Cleburne	1970	209 East Wardville, Cleburne
Emory Home		1481	300 College St. 32°15′57″N 97°10′29″W	Grandview	1986	700 East College, Grandview
First Methodist Church		1741	301 S. Spears St. 32°24′18″N 97°12′44″W	Alvarado	1965	301 South Spear Street, Alvarado
Godley School	More images	16441	309 N. Pearson St. 32°27′13″N 97°31′52″W	Godley	2010	309 N. Pearson
Henry Briden Cabin		2443	301 S. SH 174 32°14′6″N 97°22′46″W	Rio Vista	1975	First State Bank grounds, Highway 174, Rio Vista
John L. and Annie Upshaw Cleveland House		12864	808 S. Anglin St. 32°20′28″N 97°23′0″W	Cleburne	2002	808 S. Anglin St
Johnson County Courthouse†#	More images	2831	2 Main St. 32°20′50″N 97°23′10″W	Cleburne	1999	Courthouse Square, Highway 174–171, Cleburne
Johnson County Feeders Supply		18013	302 S. Caddo St. 32°20′43″N 97°23′8″W	Cleburne	2014	southwest corner of S. Caddo and Harrell streets
Joiner-Long House†#		12890	604 Prairie Ave. 32°20′23″N 97°23′29″W	Cleburne	2002	604 Prairie Avenue
Little Old House		3099	409 N. Buffalo St. 32°20′56″N 97°23′25″W	Cleburne	1965	409 North Buffalo Street, Cleburne
Lowell Smith Home‡		3077	1500 FM 916 32°14′20″N 97°21′27″W	Rio Vista	1965	from Rio Vista, take FM 916 west 1 mile; private property
Meredith Hart House†		3344	0.5 mi. E on FM 916 32°14′21″N 97°21′29″W	Rio Vista	1965	Private from Rio Vista, take FM 916 .5 mile east
Mizpah Gate		15977	100 W. Hillcrest St. 32°23′47″N 97°19′36″W	Keene	2009	in front of 100 W. Hillcrest
Renfro-Clark House		4244	128 N. Clark St. 32°32′40″N 97°19′3″W	Burleson	1970	128 North Clark Street, Burleson
Riggs Pennington Home		3983	E side SH 171 on S edge of town 32°19′23″N 97°22′36″W	Cleburne	1965	Highway 171, Hillsboro Highway, at Cleburne City Limits (east side of street)
Yellow Jacket Stadium		16542	1201 W. Henderson St. 32°20′30″N 97°24′4″W	Cleburne	2010	South side of West Henderson Street - approximately 2 miles from the Johnson County Courthouse

== Jones County ==
Registered Texas Historic Landmark	Image	Marker number	Physical address	Nearest city	Year designated	Description
Anson Opera House		173	1120 11th St. 32°45′26″N 99°53′50″W	Anson	1963	1120, 11th St., Anson
Avoca Methodist Church		252	Howard St. at CR 604 32°51′58″N 99°42′56″W	Avoca	1981	Howard Street
First Baptist Church†		15310	214 N. Swenson St. 32°56′50″N 99°48′8″W	Stamford	1989	
First Presbyterian Church Building		1826	1300 Ave. K 32°45′26″N 99°53′50″W	Anson	1990	
First United Methodist Church of Anson		1880	832 Commercial Ave. 32°45′33″N 99°53′50″W	Anson	1982	
Jones County Courthouse†	More images	12415	1100 12th St. 32°45′23″N 99°53′47″W	Anson	2000	11th St. and Commercial (US 277/83), Anson
St. John's Methodist Church†		5046	200 S. Ferguson St. 32°56′38″N 99°47′59″W	Stamford	1964	Corner of Hamilton and Ferguson streets
Swenson Ranch Commissary		11984	201 S. Swenson St. 32°56′37″N 99°48′16″W	Stamford	1999	

== Karnes County ==
Registered Texas Historic Landmark	Image	Marker number	Physical address	Nearest city	Year designated	Description
First Presbyterian Church		1815	405 E. Mayfield St. 28°53′17″N 97°53′51″W	Karnes City	1970	405 E. Mayfield, Karnes City
First Store in Panna Maria‡	More images	1874	13870 FM 81 28°57′27″N 97°53′56″W	Panna Maria	1966	FM 81, Panna Maria
Immaculate Conception Church‡	More images	2619	SW corner FM 81 at CR 382 28°57′26″N 97°53′53″W	Panna Maria	1966	FM 81, Panna Maria
John Gawlik House‡		17888	NE corner CR 381 at CR 242 28°57′30″N 97°54′1″W	Panna Maria	2014	Northeast Corner of CR 381 and CR 242 in Panna Maria.
Old Helena Courthouse		3742	FM 81 at W. CR 302 28°57′1″N 97°49′14″W	Helena	1962	Old Courthouse Square, FM 81, Helena
Ox-Cart Road (Section of Chihuahua Road)		3892	FM 81 at W. CR 302 28°57′3″N 97°49′14″W	Helena	1967	Old courthouse Square, FM 81, Helena
Pilarczyk Store‡	More images	4016	13879 FM 81 28°57′28″N 97°53′55″W	Panna Maria	1968	FM 81, Panna Maria
Saint Joseph's School‡	More images	4459	CR 382 SE of FM 81 28°57′26″N 97°53′50″W	Panna Maria	1990	FM 81, Panna Maria
Saint Joseph's School‡	More images	14815	CR 382 SE of FM 81 28°57′26″N 97°53′50″W	Panna Maria	1966	
Saint Matthew's Episcopal Church		4472	309 S. Fifth St. 28°48′56″N 97°51′4″W	Kenedy	1986	309 S. 5th Street, Kenedy

== Kaufman County ==
Registered Texas Historic Landmark	Image	Marker number	Physical address	Nearest city	Year designated	Description
Carnegie Library Building†#	More images	9425	207 N. Frances St. 32°44′17″N 96°16′42″W	Terrell	1983	
Cartwright House†	More images	9424	505 Griffith Ave. 32°44′44″N 96°17′4″W	Terrell	1968	
Church of Our Merciful Saviour		8500	500 S. Jackson St. 32°35′11″N 96°18′37″W	Kaufman	1967	500 block of S. Jackson St., Kaufman
Church of the Good Shepherd		8499	200 W. College St. 32°44′23″N 96°16′41″W	Terrell	1967	200 W. College (corner of college and Frances Sts.), Terrell
Covenant United Presbyterian Church		8504	400 E. Mulberry St. 32°35′20″N 96°18′23″W	Kaufman	1971	400 E. Mulberry St., Kaufman
Dick P. Moore House		8536	306 S. Bois d'Arc St. 32°44′51″N 96°28′23″W	Forney	1985	306 S. Bois d'Arc St., Forney
Dr. L. E. Griffith Home		8524	805 First St. 32°44′36″N 96°16′58″W	Terrell	1962	805 First St., Terrell
Duncan and Emma McKellar House		16928	306 S. Center St. 32°44′43″N 96°28′18″W	Forney	2011	Forney, 306 S. Center St.
Forney High School Building	More images	8518	600 S. Bois d'Arc St. 32°44′39″N 96°28′36″W	Forney	1994	600 S. Bois d'Arc St., Forney
Greenslade Drug Store		8523	111 W. Mulberry St. 32°35′20″N 96°18′35″W	Kaufman	1968	111 W. Mulberry St. on public square, Kaufman
Griffith House		18851	801 First St. 32°44′33″N 96°17′1″W	Terrell	2017	At the corner of First and Johnson Streets, North, 30 Degrees West of the center of the intersection of those streets in Terrell.
Huff-Park House		8527	201 Wykagyl St. 32°35′25″N 96°18′49″W	Kaufman	1971	201 N. Wykagyl, Kaufman
John H. Corley Home		8501	720 Griffith Ave. 32°44′57″N 96°17′15″W	Terrell	1968	720 Griffith Ave., Terrell
McKellar House		8534	303 S. Center St. 32°44′40″N 96°28′17″W	Forney	1989	303 S. Center St., Forney
R. L. Warren House†		8560	705 Griffith Ave. 32°44′51″N 96°17′12″W	Terrell	1973	705 Griffith Avenue, Terrell
Robert A. Terrell Home		8554	Bowser Cir., Southwestern Christian College 32°44′6″N 96°17′5″W	Terrell	1962	on campus of Southwestern Christian College on Bowser St., enter off US 80/Moore Ave., Terrell
Terrell Elementary School		8555	700 N. Catherine St. 32°44′39″N 96°16′32″W	Terrell	1997	700 N. Catherine St., Terrell
Texas & Pacific Railroad Freight Depot		8559	200 S. Virginia St. 32°44′7″N 96°16′32″W	Terrell	1996	200 S. Virginia St., Terrell
Victorian Residence, 1883 (Cartwright House)†	More images	15332	505 Griffith Ave. 32°44′44″N 96°17′4″W	Terrell	1968	
W. E. Henderson Home		8525	26239 FM 429 32°47′26″N 96°11′24″W	Terrell	1970	from the intersection of US 80 and FM 429 on the eastern edge of Terrell, take FM 429 NE about 5 1/2 miles to home on W side of road
Walter P. and Meck Allen House		13855	611 Griffith Ave. 32°44′50″N 96°17′11″W	Terrell	2004	
William and Blanche Brooks House†		11986	500 S. Center St. 32°44′34″N 96°28′24″W	Forney	1997	

== Kendall County ==
Registered Texas Historic Landmark	Image	Marker number	Physical address	Nearest city	Year designated	Description
1860 Temporary Headquarters of Gen. Robert E. Lee	More images	23	N side E. Evergreen St. E of S. Main St. 29°47′18″N 98°43′43″W	Boerne	1963	Main and Evergreen Street, Boerne
1907 Comfort State Bank Building‡	More images	29	NW corner High St. and Seventh St. 29°58′2″N 98°54′29″W	Comfort	1988	Corner 7th and High Streets, Comfort
Arno Schwethelm Building‡	More images	208	701 High St. 29°58′0″N 98°54′29″W	Comfort	1981	7th and High Streets, Comfort
August Ebers House		236	W of Old Hwy. 9 S of Gillespie County line 30°8′10″N 98°49′6″W	Fredericksburg	1983	from Comfort take Old State Road 9 fourteen miles to house in Bankersmith
August Faltin Building‡	More images	237	NW corner Main St. and Seventh St. 29°57′57″N 98°54′32″W	Comfort	1982	Main and Seventh, Comfort
Beseler House		383	518 N. Main St. 29°47′53″N 98°44′3″W	Boerne	1985	
Comfort Community Church‡		998	318 High St. 29°58′13″N 98°54′48″W	Comfort	1986	High Street, between 2nd and 3rd, Comfort
Comfort Post Office‡	More images	1000	715 High St. 29°58′0″N 98°54′27″W	Comfort	1986	
Comfort School†		17739	232 High St. 29°58′15″N 98°54′53″W	Comfort	2013	NW corner of 3rd and High Streets
Fabra Smokehouse	More images	1546	202 S. Main St. 29°47′33″N 98°43′55″W	Boerne	1980	smokehouse on S side of 194 Main Street building - Boerne
Faltin Homestead‡	More images	1564	430 Seventh St. 29°57′58″N 98°54′32″W	Comfort	1962	Main and Seventh Street, Comfort
Hanisch House		2361	Fourth St. N of Cypress Creek	Comfort	1965	SH 27 and Cypress Creek, Comfort
Henry J. Graham Building	More images	2449	402 E. Blanco Rd. 29°47′47″N 98°43′49″W	Boerne	1986	on W side of city hall
Hygieostatic Bat Roost†	More images	2608	400 ft. S of FM 473 1.5 mi. E of town 29°58′13″N 98°53′5″W	Comfort	1981	from Comfort take FM 473 about 1.5 miles E - bat roost is about 400 feet S of the highway
Idlewilde Lodge		2615	115 FM 473 29°58′3″N 98°52′59″W	Comfort	1983	from Comfort, take FM 473 about 1.5 miles E - turn S onto road to lodge, about .5 mile to site
Ingenhuett-Faust Hotel‡	More images	2646	717 High St. 29°58′0″N 98°54′26″W	Comfort	1985	
Ingenhuett-Karger Saloon‡	More images	15937	725 High St. 29°57′59″N 98°54′25″W	Comfort	2009	
James House		2726	114 Oak Park Dr. 29°47′2″N 98°43′42″W	Boerne	1982	
Joseph Dienger Building†	More images	2857	106 West Blanco 29°47′40″N 98°43′55″W	Boerne	1981	
Julius A. and Anna Phillip House		2888	116 N. Plant Ave. 29°47′54″N 98°43′32″W	Boerne	1993	
Karger Building‡	More images	15936	723 High St. 29°57′59″N 98°54′26″W	Comfort	2009	725 High Street
Kendalia Community Church		2919	108 Arthur St. 29°58′9″N 98°31′36″W	Kendalia	1979	Jones and Arthurs Streets, Kendalia - two blocks N of SH 473
Kendall County Courthouse†#	More images	2921	204 E. San Antonio Ave. 29°47′40″N 98°43′50″W	Boerne	1970	San Antonio and Watts Streets, east of Main Street, Boerne
Kuhlmann-King House	More images	2977	402 E. Blanco Rd. 29°47′44″N 98°43′48″W	Boerne	1982	on W side of city hall
Lex Sanitarium		14702	300 yds. S of Johns Rd. 1 mi. W of town	Boerne	1991	
Ludwig Hein Home‡	More images	3145	622 High St. 29°58′3″N 98°54′30″W	Comfort	1987	
Otto Brinkmann House†‡	More images	3882	602 High St. 29°58′4″N 98°54′32″W	Comfort	1976	
Paul Ingenhuett Home‡	More images	3956	417 Eighth St. 29°57′57″N 98°54′25″W	Comfort	1979	
Rice Home		15626	Near Cypress Creek	Comfort	1965	
Saint Peter's Catholic Church	More images	4484	800 S. Main St. 29°47′11″N 98°43′47″W	Boerne	1987	800 Block South Main Street, Boerne
Stieler Ranch House		5120	6 mi. N on US 87 30°3′56″N 98°55′0″W	Comfort	1970	at site, U.S. 87, 6 mile N of Comfort, Texas
Stotts Home (Robert E. Lee House)	More images	14280	N side E. Evergreen St. E of S. Main St. 29°47′18″N 98°43′43″W	Boerne	1963	
The Gass Schmiede‡	More images	5343	SW corner High St. and Eighth St. 29°57′59″N 98°54′24″W	Comfort	1986	8th and High Streets, Comfort
Theis House		5460	Newton Alley behind 242 S. Main St. 29°47′31″N 98°43′52″W	Boerne	1984	on Newton Alley behind 242 Main Street, Boerne
Vogt-Clegg Log House		5660	221 S. Plant Ave. 29°47′40″N 98°43′29″W	Boerne	1993	**On Private Property**
Waring Schoolhouse	More images	5719	108 Ave. E 29°57′10″N 98°48′17″W	Waring	1986	108 Avenue, Waring - from Comfort take IH-10 2 miles S, then FM 1621 5 miles E to Waring
Welfare School		12370	217 Waring-Welfare Rd. 29°57′7″N 98°48′19″W	Welfare	2000	
Weyrich Building		16468	714 S. Main St. 29°47′12″N 98°43′45″W	Boerne	2010	714 South Main Street
Ye Kendall Inn†	More images	5925	128 W. Blanco 29°47′38″N 98°44′0″W	Boerne	1962	

== Kenedy County ==
Registered Texas Historic Landmark	Image	Marker number	Physical address	Nearest city	Year designated	Description
The Armstrong Ranch House		5287	E of US 77 S 20 mi. 26°56′11″N 97°45′53″W	Sarita	1982	from Sarita, take US 77 south about 20 miles - private - no access

== Kent County ==
Registered Texas Historic Landmark	Image	Marker number	Physical address	Nearest city	Year designated	Description
First National Bank Building†	More images	11993	102 Donaho St. 33°14′52″N 100°34′28″W	Jayton	1997	
Old Kent County Jail		3756	Jct. SH 208 at CR 200 33°10′4″N 100°45′11″W	Clairemont	1965	junction of US 380 and SH 208, Clairemont

== Kerr County ==
Registered Texas Historic Landmark	Image	Marker number	Physical address	Nearest city	Year designated	Description
A. C. Schreiner Jr. Home		51	405 Water St. 30°2′57″N 99°8′41″W	Kerrville	1981	405 Water Street, Kerrville
Cade House		11992	375 Cade Loop Rd. 30°4′7″N 99°16′11″W	Ingram	1999	Cade Loop Road, 1.3 mi. S of SH 39
Camp Verde Barracks†		680	Camp Verde Rd. 0.5 mi. W of SH 173 29°53′27″N 99°7′19″W	Camp Verde	1962	From Kerrville, take SH 173 to Camp Verde. Turn W onto Farm Road N of Verde Creek near junction with 480. Continue .5 mile to site. On private property.
Camp Verde General Store and Post Office	More images	681	285 E. Verde Creek Rd. 29°53′39″N 99°6′17″W	Camp Verde	1971	From Kerrville, take SH 173 S approximately 13 miles to Camp Verde. Store is located near intersection with FM 480.
Captain Charles Schreiner†	More images	710	216 Earl Garrett St. 30°2′46″N 99°8′23″W	Kerrville	1970	216 Earl Garrett Street, Kerrville
Captain Charles Schreiner Home†	More images	711	216 Earl Garrett St. 30°2′46″N 99°8′23″W	Kerrville	1962	216 Earl Garrett Street, Kerrville
First Presbyterian Church of Kerrville		1840	800 Jefferson St. 30°2′51″N 99°8′17″W	Kerrville	1995	800 Jefferson
First Presbyterian Church of Kerrville (sanctuary)		14483	800 Jefferson St. 30°2′51″N 99°8′17″W	Kerrville	1987	
First School House		1863	1736 Y.O. Ranch Rd. 30°12′26″N 99°40′7″W	Mountain Home	1967	from Mountain Home take SH 41 approximately 15.2 miles to Y.O. Ranch - marker located at visitor's complex
Guthrie Building†	More images	14000	241 Earl Garrett St. 30°2′47″N 99°8′22″W	Kerrville	2007	241 Earl Garrett Street
Kennedy-Petersen House		18623	840 Earl Garrett St. 30°3′7″N 99°8′2″W	Kerrville	2017	
Masonic Building†	More images	14261	211 Earl Garrett St. 30°2′44″N 99°8′23″W	Kerrville	2008	211 Earl Garrett St.
Remount Station		4240	1736 Y.O. Ranch Rd. 30°12′26″N 99°40′7″W	Mountain Home	1967	from Mountain Home, take SH 41 approximately 15.2 miles to the Y.O. Ranch - marker located at visitor's complex
San Antonio & Aransas Pass Passenger Train Depot		18622	615 Schreiner St. 30°2′59″N 99°8′20″W	Kerrville	2017	
Scott and Josephine Carr Schreiner		17951	425 Water St. 30°2′55″N 99°8′39″W	Kerrville	2014	
The Comparette Home		5312	1001 Jefferson St. 30°2′40″N 99°8′6″W	Kerrville	1979	1001 Jefferson Street, Kerrville
The Cypress Creek School	More images	5318	Stoneleigh Rd. 0.5 mi. from FM 1341 30°1′1″N 98°58′39″W	Kerrville	1982	from Kerrville, take FM 1341 about 10 miles to Cypress Creek - turn S onto Stonleigh Road, about .5 miles to school
Woolls Building†		12604	318 San Antonio St. 29°56′40″N 99°2′13″W	Center Point	2001	

== Kimble County ==
Registered Texas Historic Landmark	Image	Marker number	Physical address	Nearest city	Year designated	Description
Brambletye†		265	RM 2291 2.7 mi. N of I-10 30°33′51″N 99°51′21″W	Junction	1983	from Junction, take IH-10W about 4 miles, then north 2.7 miles on FM 2291
Campsite of Marques De Rubi, 1767		1188	RM 1674 0.9 mi. E of RM 2291 30°31′16″N 99°49′23″W	Junction	1967	about 4 miles NW of Junction on HWY 1674
First Church in Community Copperas Methodist Church		1528	I-10 N. frontage road E. of jct. RM 1674 at Exit 442 30°30′0″N 99°58′48″W	Junction	1968	from Junction go west on IH-10 11.5 miles - take exit FM 1674, go east 1.1 miles to marker and church
Hogget Home		2321	0.5 mi. along previous US 377 roadway from jct. US 377 and Park Road 73 30°26′42″N 99°49′22″W	Junction	1965	from Junction, take US 377 about 5 miles to turnoff to state park (Hwy. 73) - take right on dead end road, go .5 mi. to home (private property)
Kimble County Courthouse	More images	11708	501 Main St. 30°29′20″N 99°45′57″W	Junction	2000	
Kimble County Jail		2892	415 Pecan St. 30°29′24″N 99°45′54″W	Junction	1964	N. 5th and Pecan St.
Marvin E. and Retta Ann Blackburn House		13206	1720 College St. 30°29′19″N 99°46′46″W	Junction	2004	1720 College Street
Masonic Hall		3164	613 Main St. 30°29′21″N 99°46′1″W	Junction	1966	
Near Route of Old Military Road		3545	I-10 S. frontage road at FM 2169 jct. at Exit 465 30°25′4″N 99°40′19″W	Junction	1975	from Junction, take IH-10E about 8 miles to Exit #465 (Segovia) - marker is on access road in front of truck stop
Old Cloud Home		3638	FM 2169 5 mi. E. of Junction 30°30′5″N 99°42′1″W	Junction	1964	on FM 2169 5 miles east of Junction
Old Log Cabin		3641	101 N. Fourth St. 30°29′19″N 99°45′52″W	Junction	1965	corner of 4th and College St. (museum)
Old Noxville School		3618	CR 4731 near Knoxville Cemetery 30°22′18″N 99°23′29″W	Junction	1968	29 miles E of Junction Via FM 479 on CR just E of little Devil's River; school is about 1/2 down CR.
Old Rock Store, 1879		4323	119 N. Sixth St. 30°29′19″N 99°46′0″W	Junction	1964	Corner of 6th and College St., Junction
Reichenau Gap		4238	1.5 miles SW of London on US 377 30°39′11″N 99°35′16″W	London	1966	1.5 miles SW of London on US 377

== King County ==
Registered Texas Historic Landmark	Image	Marker number	Physical address	Nearest city	Year designated	Description
King County Courthouse		2945	700 Baker St. 33°37′8″N 100°19′20″W	Guthrie	1962	Courthouse, intersection of Highway 82 and 83, Guthrie

== Kinney County ==
Registered Texas Historic Landmark	Image	Marker number	Physical address	Nearest city	Year designated	Description
1873 Infantry Barracks‡		16385	367 Fort Clark Rd. 29°18′16″N 100°25′15″W	Brackettville	2010	Brackettville, 367 Fort Clark Road
1886 Kitchen/Mess Hall‡		18182	2-3 Mackenzie Rd 29°18′24″N 100°25′10″W	Brackettville	2015	
8 Medallions on Officers' Row Quarters‡		17	Colony Row 29°18′21″N 100°25′20″W	Brackettville	1991	
Adjutant's Quarters (Quarters # 20)‡		12001	20 Colony Row 29°18′15″N 100°25′25″W	Brackettville	1999	
Army Service Club‡		15793	154 Fort Clark Rd. 29°18′49″N 100°25′3″W	Brackettville	2009	154 Fort Clark Road
Catholic Church		761	301 S. Sweeney St. 29°18′25″N 100°25′8″W	Brackettville	1966	fronts Sweeney Street, just past (south of) where it crosses El Paso Street, Brackettville
Catholic Church		14206	301 S. Sweeney St. 29°18′49″N 100°25′3″W	Brackettville	1962	
Commanding Officer's Quarters‡		1001	29 Colony Row 29°18′21″N 100°25′21″W	Brackettville	1988	No. 29 colony row, Ft. Clark Springs, Brackettville
Filippone Building		12735	W. El Paso St. and James St. 29°18′51″N 100°25′5″W	Brackettville	2001	El Paso and Brown Streets
Fort Clark Guardhouse‡		1976	McClernand Rd. at Crockett Rd. 29°18′16″N 100°25′7″W	Brackettville	1962	on northeast corner of McClernand and Baylor Street, Fort Clark Springs, Brackettville
Fort Clark Post Theater‡		12002	Patton Dr. at Fort Clark Rd. 29°18′18″N 100°25′16″W	Brackettville	1997	SW corner of Fort Clark Rd. and Patton Rd., Fort Clark Springs
Kinney County Courthouse†#		13189	501 N. Ann St. 29°18′48″N 100°25′3″W	Brackettville	2003	Brackettville, 501 N. Ann Street
Las Moras Masonic Lodge Building		3040	503 S. Ann St. 29°18′41″N 100°25′2″W	Brackettville	1990	Ann Street (Highway 334) at Cook Alley, Brackettville
Married Officers' Quarters 8-9‡		13643	8 Colony Row 29°18′21″N 100°25′20″W	Brackettville	2006	8 Colony Row
Montalvo House		3440	103 E. Thomas St. 29°18′50″N 100°24′53″W	Brackettville	1979	building now fronts Thomas Street just east of where H crosses Ann Street (and Rt. 334), Brackettville (called "The Well")
New Cavalry Barracks‡		15811	123 McClernand Road 29°18′17″N 100°25′5″W	Brackettville	2009	123 McClernand Road
Officers' Club Open Mess‡		16424	1 McClernand Rd.N 29°18′23″N 100°25′12″W	Brackettville	2010	
Officers Quarters 2-3 and 4‡		13963	2-3-4 Colony Row 29°18′27″N 100°25′18″W	Brackettville	2007	Fort Clark Springs
Officers' Row Quarters‡		3678	Colony Row 29°18′18″N 100°25′25″W	Fort Clark Springs	1991	Colony ROW Road between Nos. 8, 9 and 10, Ft. Clark Springs, Brackettville
Old Guard House		3738	Patton Dr. 29°18′21″N 100°25′18″W	Brackettville	1962	fronts Patton Road in fort's interior open space, Fort Clark, Brackettville
Partrick Building		15039	114 North St. 29°18′41″N 100°25′6″W	Brackettville	2008	114 North Street
Robert E. Lee Building‡		4295	Baylor St. at NW corner with Lee Ct. 29°18′18″N 100°25′12″W	Brackettville	1963	northwest corner of Lee and Baylor Streets, Fort Clark, Brackettville
Ross Home		4353	500 S. Ann St. 29°18′40″N 100°25′2″W	Brackettville	1962	located on Ann Street (Highway 334) directly across from Chamber of Commerce and Masonic Lodge, Brackettville
Staff Officers' Quarters‡		5086	Bend of Colony Row 29°18′17″N 100°25′27″W	Brackettville	1990	Colony ROW between quarters Nos. 22 and 25, Ft. Clark Springs, Brackettville
U.S. Army Signal Corps Building		15094	202 McClain Road 29°18′17″N 100°25′28″W	Brackettville	2008	

== Kleberg County ==
Registered Texas Historic Landmark	Image	Marker number	Physical address	Nearest city	Year designated	Description
Henrietta M. King High School†		2440	400 W. King Ave. 27°31′0″N 97°52′22″W	Kingsville	1981	Kleberg and Third Avenue, Kingsville
Historic Cattle Dipping Vat		763	3 mi. N on Bus. US 77 27°33′13″N 97°50′12″W	Kingsville	1967	from Kingsville, take US 77 (business route) 3 miles north
Kingsville Railroad Depot		2955	102 E. Kleberg Ave. 27°31′1″N 97°52′6″W	Kingsville	1974	Kleberg Avenue and railroad track (7th Street), Kingsville
Robert J. Kleberg Public Library		4297	SE corner W. Yoakum Ave. at N. Third St. 27°31′3″N 97°52′18″W	Kingsville	1981	Third and Yoakum streets (southeast corner), Kingsville
Santa Gertrudis, Headquarters of the King Ranch⁂‡	More images	4583	Ranch road W of jct. SH 141 at W. Santa Gertrudis St. 27°31′4″N 97°55′2″W	Kingsville	1981	on private property—King Ranch off SH 141 at west edge of Kingsville

== Knox County ==
Registered Texas Historic Landmark	Image	Marker number	Physical address	Nearest city	Year designated	Description
Benjamin School (razed)		9430	E. Hayes St. and S. Church St. 33°35′32″N 99°47′23″W	Benjamin	1966	Hwy. 82 and S. Church St.
Brazos River Bridge†		18703	SH 6 over Brazos River 33°30′2″N 99°48′7″W	Benjamin	2015	6 miles south of Benjamin on Hwy 6
First Christian Church (razed)		1699	N. Bedford St. and E. Dimmit St. 33°35′7″N 99°47′29″W	Benjamin	1967	corner of E. Bedford St. and E. Dimmit St., Benjamin

== La Salle County ==
Registered Texas Historic Landmark	Image	Marker number	Physical address	Nearest city	Year designated	Description
Welhausen School		8138	204 NE. Lane St. 28°25′49″N 99°13′42″W	Cotulla	1990	204 NE Lane St.

== Lamar County ==
Registered Texas Historic Landmark	Image	Marker number	Physical address	Nearest city	Year designated	Description
Atkinson-Morris House†		8182	802 Fitzhugh Ave. 33°40′7″N 95°32′49″W	Paris	1972	
Capt. Wm. E. Moore Home		8211			1965	
Central Presbyterian Church‡		8189	309 S. Church St. 33°39′31″N 95°33′15″W	Paris	1994	
Ewing House		8192	135 Fourth St. NW 33°39′46″N 95°33′38″W	Paris	1967	
First Presbyterian Church†		8197	410 W. Kaufman St. 33°39′36″N 95°33′37″W	Paris	1968	
Hayes House		8200	901 S. Main St. 33°39′12″N 95°33′22″W	Paris	1983	
Home of Sam Bell Maxey†‡§#	More images	8208	812 S. Church St. 33°39′14″N 95°33′17″W	Paris	1962	
J. M. Biard House	More images	8183	1015 W. Kaufman St. 33°39′33″N 95°33′58″W	Paris	1965	
J. M. Early House		8191	1970 Clarksville St. 33°39′19″N 95°32′7″W	Paris	1968	
Judge Wm. Henry Lightfoot House‡		8207	746 S. Church St. 33°39′16″N 95°33′17″W	Paris	1965	
Lamar County Courthouse‡#	More images	12313	119 N. Main St. 33°39′45″N 95°33′24″W	Paris	2000	
Lightfoot-Coleman House‡		12012	746 S. Church St. 33°39′16″N 95°33′17″W	Paris	1965	
McCuistion Home†		8210	730 Clarksville St. 33°39′36″N 95°32′56″W	Paris	1965	
Pleasant Grove		8231	1.5 mi. E on FM 1184 33°31′10″N 95°37′8″W	Howland	1966	FM 1184 abvout 1.5 mi. east of Howland
Scott Mansion†‡		8225	425 S. Church St. 33°39′27″N 95°33′15″W	Paris	1984	
Union Station†	More images	13688	1100 W. Kaufman St. 33°39′35″N 95°34′1″W	Paris	2002	Paris, 1100 W. Kaufman
Wilburn Family Home		8230		Petty	1973	private property - call CHC for information
William Huddle Home		8202	1038 FM 2820 33°42′7″N 95°38′42″W	Hopewell	1968	on FM 2820 in Hopewell, across from VFW
Williams, Sheb, Home		14599	1.5 mi. E on FM 1184 33°31′10″N 95°37′8″W	Howland	1966	

== Lamb County ==
Registered Texas Historic Landmark	Image	Marker number	Physical address	Nearest city	Year designated	Description
Old Watering Trough		3832	S side E 100 blk US 84 34°4′2″N 102°31′27″W	Sudan	1966	on US 84 between Commerce & Main Streets-Sudan; marker faces dirt access road
Spade Ranch Headquarters, North		14752		Hart Camp	1965	
Sudan Hotel		5145	104 E. First Ave. 34°3′59″N 102°31′30″W	Sudan	1963	on 1st Street, between Main & Commerce-Sudan

== Lampasas County ==
Registered Texas Historic Landmark	Image	Marker number	Physical address	Nearest city	Year designated	Description
A. J. Northington House		54	803 S. Live Oak St. 31°3′44″N 98°10′35″W	Lampasas	1964	
C.C. Abney House		594	402 S. Broad St. 31°3′50″N 98°11′5″W	Lampasas	1964	402 South Broad Street, Lampasas
Central Christian Church of Lampasas‡		793	201 E. Third St. 31°3′55″N 98°10′52″W	Lampasas	1985	NE corner of Chestnut and Third Street, Lampasas
First Public School in Lampasas		1858	NE corner of N. Main St. at E. North Ave. 31°4′6″N 98°10′52″W	Lampasas	1965	NE corner of intersection of N. Main St. & E. North Ave. BUILDING RAZED
Hart House‡		2398	511 Western Ave. 31°3′51″N 98°10′42″W	Lampasas	1966	511 Western Avenue, Lampasas
Huling Cottage		2595	205 E. Second St. 31°3′59″N 98°10′52″W	Lampasas	1965	205 Second Street, Lampasas
J. A. Adkins House		2666	1211 Taylor St. 31°3′58″N 98°10′4″W	Lampasas	1966	1211 Taylor Street, Lampasas
John Patterson House		2797	E of US 281 on S edge of town 31°18′0″N 98°10′7″W	Adamsville	1964	east side of Highway 281, s. city limits, Adamsville
Junior High School		14325	N. Main St. at E. Ave. A 31°4′9″N 98°10′55″W	Lampasas	1965	
Keystone Hotel‡		2935	404 E. Second St. 31°3′59″N 98°10′45″W	Lampasas	1965	404 Second Street, Lampasas
Lampasas Colored School†		15734	514 College St. 31°3′53″N 98°10′23″W	Lampasas	2009	
Lampasas County Courthouse†‡#	More images	12795	501 E. Fourth St. 31°3′56″N 98°10′40″W	Lampasas	1965	Courthouse square, Live Oak St.
Lampasas County Courthouse Site†‡#	More images	3023	501 E. Fourth St. 31°3′56″N 98°10′40″W	Lampasas	1965	Courthouse Square, Western and 3rd, Lampasas
Lampasas County Jail‡		6023	410 E. Fourth St. 31°3′52″N 98°10′42″W	Lampasas	1965	In front of new jail, corner (southwest) of Live Oak Street and 4th Street, Lampasas
Lee Straley House		3064	3 mi. N of town E of US 281 31°18′52″N 98°10′9″W	Adamsville	1963	from Adamsville, take Highway 281 north about 3 miles, house is on east side of road
Malone-Manuel House		14609	502 W. Third St. 31°3′47″N 98°11′13″W	Lampasas	2005	
Manuel Hardware Building‡		15765	401 E. Third St. 31°3′57″N 98°10′45″W	Lampasas	2009	
Matt and Rebecca Smith House		13606	202 E. Fifth St. 31°3′47″N 98°10′49″W	Lampasas	2006	202 E 5th St
Moses Hughes Home, 1856		3477	5 mi. W on FM 580 31°5′26″N 98°17′39″W	Lampasas	1969	from Lampasas, take FM 580 west about 5 miles
Old Cook Home, 1861		1051	313 Water St. 31°3′32″N 98°10′32″W	Lampasas	1966	Behind Winn Dixie. Driveway located on east side of S. Western Street about 1/10 mile north of Highway 190, Lampasas.
Old Huling Mansion		3751	2.5 mi. W on FM 580, S side of road 31°4′2″N 98°15′7″W	Lampasas	1966	from Lampasas, take FM 580 west about 2.5 miles (south side of road), private ranch (MARKER REPORTED MISSING 6/23/2009)
Philip Smith House		4007	4684 FM 2527 31°13′26″N 98°6′44″W	Lampasas	1966	From Lampasas, take Highway 281 north about 8 miles, then go east about 4 miles on FM 1690; follow FM 2527 south about 1.3 miles to house (located just south of graveyard on east side of road).
Phillips and Trosper Buildings†‡		4010	408-410 E. Third St. 31°3′56″N 98°10′42″W	Lampasas	1994	408-410 East 3rd Street, Lampasas
Saint Mary's Episcopal Church‡		4467	501 S. Chestnut St. 31°3′51″N 98°10′51″W	Lampasas	1967	Corner of 4th and Chestnut Street, Lampasas
Santa Fe Depot, 1904‡		4575	501 E. Second St. 31°4′2″N 98°10′43″W	Lampasas	1966	Second and Live Oak Street (501 Second St.)
Shade Denson House		4651	S of CR 3010 just past Sulphur Creek crossing 31°3′40″N 98°7′45″W	Lampasas	1964	From Lampasas take 190 east about 1 mile, then go north on CR 7 about 1.3 mile. House is on south side of road just past Sparks Crossing. (MARKER REPORTED MISSING 6/23/2009)
Site of Old Opera House‡		4855	302 E. Third St. 31°3′55″N 98°10′48″W	Lampasas	1967	City Hall, Third Street, Lampasas
Summerville Home		5148	106 N. Broad St. 31°4′2″N 98°11′10″W	Lampasas	1964	
Trosper Building†‡		15490	408-410 E. Third St. 31°3′56″N 98°10′42″W	Lampasas	1994	
W. N. Huling Home, 1877		5676	204 S. Main St. 31°4′0″N 98°10′52″W	Lampasas	1965	204 South Main Street, Lampasas
W. R. Hughes Home		5678	Pvt. Rd. 89 E of FM 1715 31°5′45″N 98°2′34″W	Kempner	1966	Private property. From Kempner, take US 190 West about 3.5 miles, then go north on CR 8 about 2 miles to private drive (no access - house is down private drive #89 about 2 miles near junction of Sulphur Creek and Lampasas).
Witcher House		17108	407 S. Park St. 31°3′47″N 98°11′11″W	Lampasas	2012	407 S. Park Street

== Lavaca County ==
Registered Texas Historic Landmark	Image	Marker number	Physical address	Nearest city	Year designated	Description
Estate of John Hallett		1489	600 N. La Grange St. 29°27′2″N 96°56′36″W	Hallettsville	1967	corner of West La Grange and Crockett, Hallettsville
Herder Half Moon Place		2458	1.6 mi. SW on FM 533 from US 90A 29°25′45″N 97°12′39″W	Shiner	1982	from Shiner, take US 90A west 1.2 mile take FM 531 southwest 1.6 miles
Masonic Lodge Building		3245	511 N. Ave. D 29°25′48″N 97°10′12″W	Shiner	1967	511 North Avenue D, Shiner
Old Hanging Tree	More images	3740	Park Road 3 in city park next to Hallettsville Golf Course 29°27′13″N 96°56′38″W	Hallettsville	1967	in city park, in front of Golf Club, west side of US 77 north city limits, Hallettsville
Old Moulton Baptist Church	More images	3772	2287 FM 1680 29°35′13″N 97°10′33″W	Old Moulton	1970	from Moulton, take FM 1680 northwest about 2 miles to Old Moulton
Orrin L. Winters Cabin	More images	3878	Veterans Dr. in city park 29°34′10″N 97°9′1″W	Moulton	1974	in City Park, Lancaster Street, Moulton
Orth-Fitch House		3879	507 Coke St. 29°17′8″N 97°8′24″W	Yoakum	1983	507 Coke Street, Yoakum
Park Place School Building		3937	505 Elenora St. 29°17′36″N 97°8′18″W	Yoakum	1996	505 Elenora, Yoakum (burned in April 2014)
Saints Cyril and Methodius Catholic Church†		4489	306 S. Ave. F 29°25′23″N 97°9′56″W	Shiner	1990	424 St. Ludmilla, Shiner
Sam and Will Moore Institute	More images	4510	400 Bobkat Dr. 29°34′44″N 97°8′54″W	Moulton	1973	Moulton High School, west Bobcat Drive, Moulton
Shiner Opera House	More images	4685	207 E. Seventh St. 29°25′52″N 97°10′17″W	Shiner	1979	7th Street and Avenue D, Shiner
The Lay-Bozka House†	More images	5369	205 Fairwinds St. 29°26′31″N 96°56′50″W	Hallettsville	1968	205 Fair Winds or 90A, south side of intersection with Hackberry Street, Hallettsville
William Green House		5828	817 N. Ave. E 29°25′53″N 97°10′24″W	Shiner	1970	Highway 90A, Shiner (across from City Hall)

== Lee County ==
Registered Texas Historic Landmark	Image	Marker number	Physical address	Nearest city	Year designated	Description
Early Chapel Cemetery		8144	0.2 mi. S of FM 696 E 3.2 mi. from Loop 123 30°24′7″N 97°3′47″W	Lexington	1967	3.5 mi. east of Lexington on FM 696, then south on dirt road about .2 mile
Edward R. Sinks House		18813	818 E. Hempstead St. 30°10′49″N 96°55′49″W	Giddings	2017	
First Presbyterian Church	More images	8150	132 S. Grimes St. 30°10′55″N 96°56′10″W	Giddings	1967	Grimes and Hempstead St.
Fletcher Home†	More images	8151	171 E. Hempstead St. 30°10′55″N 96°56′12″W	Giddings	1966	171 Hempstead at Grimes St.
Lee County Courthouse†#	More images	8166	200 S. Main St. 30°10′53″N 96°56′14″W	Giddings	1968	Main St.
Old Evergreen Tree		8145	FM 1624 halfway between SH 21 and US 77 30°16′13″N 96°57′15″W	Lincoln	1967	.5 mi. south on FM 1624 from SH 21/FM 1624 intersection; halfway between SH 21 and US 77
St. Paul's Lutheran Church	More images	8175	1572 CR 211 30°6′51″N 96°59′17″W	Serbin	1963	6 miles south of Giddings on FM 448, 4.5 miles west on FM 2239, then south on CR 211, Serbin

== Leon County ==
Registered Texas Historic Landmark	Image	Marker number	Physical address	Nearest city	Year designated	Description
Concord Missionary Baptist Church		9619	CR 348 at SH 7 31°15′20″N 96°8′22″W	Concord	1970	off SH 7 on CR 348 near cemetery in Concord about 8 mi. S of Jewett; church burned in wildfires in 2011, marker replaced with subject marker in 2012
Evans Chapel Church		17959	4133 FM 977 W 31°7′53″N 96°1′39″W	Leona	2014	4.1 miles west of Leona on FM 977, south (left) side of FM 977
James and Julia Anderson House		12399	417 Weakley St. 31°21′41″N 96°8′53″W	Jewett	1999	
Leon County Courthouse†#		9629	206 St. Marys St. 31°15′30″N 95°58′41″W	Centerville	1966	at intersection of SH 7 and SH 75
Old Bowling School and Masonic Lodge		9618	W side FM 1147 near S end 31°12′59″N 96°10′48″W	Marquez	1964	from Marquez, take SH 7 about 3.8 mi. E to FM 1147, go S about 3 mi. to school on W side of road - just before pavement ends

== Liberty County ==
Registered Texas Historic Landmark	Image	Marker number	Physical address	Nearest city	Year designated	Description
Cleveland-Partlow House†		9649	2131 Grand Ave. 30°3′49″N 94°47′6″W	Liberty	1962	
Dayton's Old School		17880	111 W. Houston Ave. 30°2′36″N 94°53′18″W	Dayton	2014	Dayton Old School Museum
Gillard - Duncan House		9655	650 FM 1011 30°5′52″N 94°45′45″W	Liberty	1981	Sam Houston Regional Library and Research Center
Henry O. Ager Home		16900	537 Fannin St. 30°3′39″N 94°47′42″W	Liberty	2011	Northeast corner of Block 20; corner of Cos & Fannin, one block East of Main St.
Hill and Sara McClanahan House		16840	401 Austin St. 30°20′59″N 95°5′18″W	Cleveland	2011	
Homestead of John S. and Jane Susanna Lee Brown, 1856		9638	0.5 mi. off SH 61 approx. 4 mi. S	Devers	1965	4 mi. S of Devers, Anahuac Highway 1/2 mi. of road
Judge Walter S. Neel House		17824	1204 N. Main St. 30°3′9″N 94°53′36″W	Dayton	2014	1204 N. Main Street
Old Wells' Store		9692	SH 321 at CR 2274 30°17′34″N 94°58′41″W	Cleveland	1968	from Cleveland take SH 321 about 7 mi. SE
Ott Hotel		13537	305 Travis St. 30°3′29″N 94°47′51″W	Liberty	2005	305 Travis
Thomas Jefferson Chambers Home†		9644	624 Milam St. 30°3′42″N 94°47′53″W	Liberty	1978	
Tom Hill House		16405	211 S. Bonham Ave. 30°20′23″N 95°5′13″W	Cleveland	2010	Cleveland, 211 S. Bonham

== Limestone County ==
Registered Texas Historic Landmark	Image	Marker number	Physical address	Nearest city	Year designated	Description
Bassett House		18240	1343 CR 666 31°19′56″N 96°40′2″W	Kosse	2015	1343 Limestone County Road 666 (located 3 miles northwest of Kosse)
Early Mexia Home		1347	621 N. Red River St. 31°41′16″N 96°28′38″W	Mexia	1969	621 N Red River - Corner of Red River and Grason St., Mexia
Focke Gin, Old (BURNED)		14338		Mexia	1962	
Henry-Martin-Dorsett House		15024		Mexia	1962	
Kosse Tabernacle		16984	200 W. Adams St. 31°18′32″N 96°37′52″W	Kosse	2011	NW Madison &S.W Corner of Adams and Mignonette
L. P. Smith House		2982	101 S. Kaufman St. 31°40′49″N 96°28′45″W	Mexia	1967	101 S. Kaufmann St. Mexia
Limestone County Courthouse		12031	200 W. State St. 31°31′21″N 96°32′6″W	Groesbeck	1998	
Martin House		3228	SH 14, S of Mexia	Mexia	1962	From Mexia, take SH 14 south about 3 miles.
Miss Rogers' Music Room		3402	609 N. Bonham St. 31°41′8″N 96°28′53″W	Mexia	1965	609 N Bonham St., Mexia

== Lipscomb County ==
Registered Texas Historic Landmark	Image	Marker number	Physical address	Nearest city	Year designated	Description
Lipscomb County Courthouse†#	More images	12483	Courthouse Sq. 36°14′2″N 100°16′14″W	Lipscomb	2000	

== Live Oak County ==
Registered Texas Historic Landmark	Image	Marker number	Physical address	Nearest city	Year designated	Description
Charter Oak		824	FM 799, 6 mi. SE of George West in Gussettville	George West	1966	from George West, take FM 799 east about 6 miles
Chauncy and Minnie Canfield House		17975	508 Crockett St. 28°20′4″N 98°7′3″W	George West	2014	Northeast corner of Frio and Crockett Streets
Cunningham Home		17657	411 E. Thornton St. 28°27′36″N 98°10′42″W	Three Rivers	2013	Northwest corner of East Thornton St. and North Hermann Avenue
First State Bank Building		1871	101 E. Thornton St. 28°27′39″N 98°10′56″W	Three Rivers	1964	Thornton and Harborth Streets, near town square, Three Rivers
Live Oak County Jail†	More images	18104	107 Currey St. 28°26′56″N 98°6′5″W	Oakville	2015	Southeast corner of Curry and Community Circle
Murphy Ranch House		18272			2015	by Lake Corpus Christi
Rialto Theater		18459	106 W. Thornton St. 28°27′39″N 98°10′56″W	Three Rivers	2016	

== Llano County ==
Registered Texas Historic Landmark	Image	Marker number	Physical address	Nearest city	Year designated	Description
Acme Dry Goods Building‡		9431	109 W. Main St. 30°45′2″N 98°40′35″W	Llano	1987	
Antlers Hotel‡		15150	1001 King Ct. 30°39′38″N 98°26′12″W	Kingsland	2002	
Badu House†		9433	601 Bessemer Ave. 30°45′24″N 98°40′34″W	Llano	1981	
Cassaday Grey Granite Company Office Building		9434	501 Bessemer Ave. 30°45′21″N 98°40′33″W	Llano	1992	
Edna J. Moore Seaholm House		12038	1105 Wright St. 30°44′48″N 98°40′43″W	Llano	1998	
Ford Street Commercial Row‡		9439	702, 704, and 706 Ford St. 30°45′4″N 98°40′33″W	Llano	1991	702, 704, 706 Ford St.
Grace Episcopal Church		9441	1200 Oatman St. 30°44′47″N 98°40′28″W	Llano	1965	
Lappe House		9445	On private property 3 mi. NE of RM 1431 near Ft. Mason crossing on Colorado River 30°42′41″N 98°24′44″W	Mason	1964	private property
Llano County Courthouse†‡#		9446	107 W. Sandstone St. 30°44′59″N 98°40′36″W	Llano	1980	
Llano County Jail†		9448	700 Oatman St. 30°45′3″N 98°40′28″W	Llano	1979	
Old Southern Hotel Building†		9455	201 W. Main St. 30°45′1″N 98°40′38″W	Llano	1981	corner of Berry and Main
Robert F. Rowntree House		18463	18606 RM 2323 30°34′3″N 98°52′24″W	Llano	2016	20 miles SW of town of Llano, less than 1 mile east of Prairie Mountain School on RR 2323
Trinity Methodist Church		18029	Old Schoolhouse Rd. 30°42′1″N 98°47′29″W	Castell	1962	Old Schoolhouse Road, off FM 152
Watkins House		9459	210 W. Sandstone St. 30°44′56″N 98°40′41″W	Llano	1994	

== Loving County ==
Registered Texas Historic Landmark	Image	Marker number	Physical address	Nearest city	Year designated	Description
Mentone Community Church		3340	NW corner Pecos St. and Wheat St. 31°42′29″N 103°36′4″W	Mentone	1964	on Church, 3 blocks N. of Courthouse Mentone

== Lubbock County ==
Registered Texas Historic Landmark	Image	Marker number	Physical address	Nearest city	Year designated	Description
Arnett House		18255	2100 Dover Ave. 33°34′30″N 101°55′59″W	Lubbock	2015	
Bacon Home†	More images	273	1802 Broadway St. 33°35′6″N 101°51′23″W	Lubbock	1982	1802 Broadway, Lubbock.
Bledsoe Santa Fe Depot		434	6105 19th St. 33°34′39″N 101°56′58″W	Lubbock	1973	6105 Nineteenth Street, Lubbock
Igo Ranch Headquarters (NOT FOUND)		15296		Lubbock	1962	
Immanuel Lutheran Church		18254	12421 S. CR 3100 33°28′53″N 101°42′38″W	Posey	2015	
Isham and Texana Tubbs House†	More images	12723	602 Fulton Ave. 33°35′23″N 101°56′36″W	Lubbock	2002	602 Fulton Avenue
Lubbock High School†	More images	3144	2004 19th St. 33°34′41″N 101°51′35″W	Lubbock	1984	2004 19th Street, Lubbock
Lubbock Women's Club		17701	2020 Broadway St. 33°35′5″N 101°51′41″W	Lubbock	2013	
Mast House		5376	2301 Broadway St. 33°35′3″N 101°51′59″W	Lubbock	1983	2301 Broadway, Lubbock
Original Lubbock Municipal Airport		17972	6004 N. Cedar Ave. (I-27 Exit 9) 33°39′19″N 101°50′4″W	Lubbock	2014	
Rockwell Lumber Company Office Building		4329	166 N. Seventh St. 33°26′20″N 101°38′29″W	Slaton	1986	166 North 7th Street, Slaton
Slaton Harvey House	More images	14011	400 Railroad Ave. 33°26′33″N 101°38′19″W	Slaton	2007	400 Railroad Ave.
St. Elizabeth's Catholic Church		14893	2300 Main St. 33°35′7″N 101°51′59″W	Lubbock	2005	
Texas Tech Dairy Barn†‡	More images	18313	1503 Detroit Ave. 33°34′53″N 101°52′40″W	Lubbock	2016	Dairy Barn is located on the campus of Texas Tech University

== Lynn County ==
Registered Texas Historic Landmark	Image	Marker number	Physical address	Nearest city	Year designated	Description
A. J. Warren Building	More images	55	904 Eighth St. 32°57′54″N 101°49′58″W	O'Donnell	1975	Corner of Eighth and Doak Streets, O'Donnell
Lynn County Courthouse†#	More images	15274	Bounded by S. 1st St., S. 2nd St., Ave. H, and Ave. J 33°9′52″N 101°47′44″W	Tahoka	2008	
Spanish Explorers' Route		4999	Green Ave. at 17th St. 33°19′18″N 101°43′50″W	Wilson	1967	SH 211, west limit of Wilson in Roadside Park
T Bar Ranch Headquarters		15121	NW of jct. CR M and CR 18 33°9′52″N 101°47′44″W	Tahoka	1962	
Wilson Mercantile Company		5857	1601 Tenth St. 33°14′45″N 101°53′21″W	Wilson	1967	Green Mercantile Building; Corner of Tenth Street and Greenwood Avenue, Wilson

== Madison County ==
Registered Texas Historic Landmark	Image	Marker number	Physical address	Nearest city	Year designated	Description
Shapira Hotel†	More images	11261	209 N. Madison St. 30°57′1″N 95°54′53″W	Madisonville	1982	209 N. Madison St.

== Marion County ==
Registered Texas Historic Landmark	Image	Marker number	Physical address	Nearest city	Year designated	Description
19th Century Business House‡	More images	8046	123 W. Austin St. 32°45′23″N 94°20′43″W	Jefferson	1966	
A. M. Urquhart House		8100	1105 S. Line St. 32°45′7″N 94°20′57″W	Jefferson	1985	
Alice Emmert Home‡		8030	408 E. Jefferson St. 32°45′22″N 94°21′2″W	Jefferson	1974	
Alley-McKay House‡		8009	306 Delta St. 32°45′26″N 94°21′8″W	Jefferson	1986	
Atkins House‡		8011	407 E. Walker St. 32°45′35″N 94°21′3″W	Jefferson	1972	
Austin Street Mercantile‡	More images	8012	107 W. Austin St. 32°45′24″N 94°20′41″W	Jefferson	1970	Austin St., across from Courthouse
Beard House†‡	More images	8013	212 N. Vale St. 32°45′27″N 94°20′46″W	Jefferson	1966	
Benefield Sr. Home		14440	1009 S. Line St. 32°45′9″N 94°20′57″W	Jefferson	1966	
Bluebonnett Farm		8016	FM 2208 E of US 59 across from roadside park 32°44′13″N 94°20′47″W	Jefferson	1966	
Brown-Bender House		8020	409 E. Broadway St. 32°45′42″N 94°21′2″W	Jefferson	1983	House damaged by fire in August 2013. Marker is temporarily in storage.
Brown Building‡	More images	8019	112 N. Vale St. 32°45′24″N 94°20′44″W	Jefferson	1966	
Capt. Wm. Perry House†		8047	510 N. Walnut St. 32°45′38″N 94°20′49″W	Jefferson	1966	
Carlson, Mary, Home†‡	More images	15468	501 E. Walker St. 32°45′34″N 94°21′0″W	Jefferson	1966	
Christ Episcopal Church‡	More images	8022	703 S. Main St. 32°45′20″N 94°21′2″W	Jefferson	1964	
Claiborne House‡		18545	312 S. Alley St. 32°45′31″N 94°21′4″W	Jefferson	2016	
Dan N. Alley Home†‡	More images	8021	501 E. Walker St. 32°45′34″N 94°21′0″W	Jefferson	1966	
Deware, J. M., Residence‡	More images	14492	202 E. Dixon St. 32°45′37″N 94°21′13″W	Jefferson	1966	
Doyle Bower House		8017	1105 S. Line St. 32°45′10″N 94°20′57″W	Jefferson	1966	
Early Jefferson Lodge Building‡	More images	8057	61 W. Dallas St. 32°45′18″N 94°20′43″W	Jefferson	1990	
Early Jefferson Masonic Lodge Building‡	More images	14819	61 W. Dallas St. 32°45′18″N 94°20′43″W	Jefferson	1990	
Excelsior House†‡	More images	8031	211 W. Austin St. 32°45′21″N 94°20′44″W	Jefferson	1962	
Falling Leaves, 1855‡		8032	304 E. Jefferson St. 32°45′22″N 94°21′9″W	Jefferson	1965	
First Methodist Church‡	More images	8039	305 W. Henderson St. 32°45′25″N 94°20′54″W	Jefferson	1965	
Freeman Plantation†	More images	8041	0.8 mi. W on SH 49 32°45′48″N 94°22′12″W	Jefferson	1980	1 mi. west of Jefferson on SH 49 (watch for sign)
Freeman Plantation†	More images	8042	0.8 mi. W on SH 49 32°45′48″N 94°22′12″W	Jefferson	1965	SH 49, 1 mi. west of Jefferson
"Gay 90's House"		8015	1009 S. Line St. 32°45′9″N 94°20′57″W	Jefferson	1966	
George T. Todd House		8096	505 N. Polk St. 32°45′36″N 94°20′52″W	Jefferson	1974	
Godfrey-Singleton House‡		18163	405 Delta St. 32°45′27″N 94°21′4″W	Jefferson	2015	
Guarding Oak‡	More images	8045	301 S. Friou St. 32°45′33″N 94°21′11″W	Jefferson	1964	
Haggard, George E., Bldg. (RE 80)‡	More images	15238	123 W. Austin St. 32°45′23″N 94°20′43″W	Jefferson	1966	
Haggard, George E., Funeral Home‡	More images	14604	123 W. Austin St. 32°45′23″N 94°20′43″W	Jefferson	1966	
Historic Houston Street Victorian Cottage		8050	312 Houston St. 32°45′5″N 94°20′54″W	Jefferson	1970	
Home of Capt. Charles G. Graham‡		8044	409 Delta St. 32°45′28″N 94°21′2″W	Jefferson	1986	
Houston Street College		15137		Jefferson	1970	
Hudgins-Blake House		8051	1111 S. Line St. 32°45′5″N 94°20′57″W	Jefferson	1973	
Immaculate Conception Church‡	More images	8052	201 N. Vale St. 32°45′25″N 94°20′47″W	Jefferson	1964	
J. H. Rowell Home‡		8084	301 S. Alley St. 32°45′33″N 94°21′6″W	Jefferson	1966	
Jay Gould Railroad Car‡	More images	8043	208 W. Austin St. 32°45′21″N 94°20′43″W	Jefferson	1964	
Jefferson Ordnance Magazine†		16909	0.3 mi. NE of SH 134 crossing of Big Cypress Bayou 32°45′29″N 94°20′18″W	Jefferson	2011	North-northeast of Highway 59 and Big Cypress Bayou
Jefferson Playhouse†‡	More images	8058	209 W. Henderson St. 32°45′25″N 94°20′51″W	Jefferson	1965	
Jefferson Public Library‡	More images	8059	303 W. Lafayette St. 32°45′23″N 94°20′50″W	Jefferson	1966	
Knightwood‡		8064	201 E. Walker St. 32°45′35″N 94°21′13″W	Jefferson	1965	
Manse, The†‡	More images	15534	401 Delta St. 32°45′27″N 94°21′3″W	Jefferson	1966	
Marion County Courthouse‡#	More images	14394	102 W. Austin St. 32°45′23″N 94°20′40″W	Jefferson	2002	
McCasland, Joe, Home‡		14851	403 E. Walker St. 32°45′35″N 94°21′4″W	Jefferson	1966	
Methodist Church‡	More images	15382	305 W. Henderson St. 32°45′25″N 94°20′54″W	Jefferson	1965	
Moseley, J.B., Home		15495	412 N. Soda St. 32°45′40″N 94°20′44″W	Jefferson	1966	
Murphy Building‡		8074	114 W. Austin St. 32°45′22″N 94°20′41″W	Jefferson	1983	
Old Apothecary Shop		8010	312 E. Broadway St. 32°45′40″N 94°21′6″W	Jefferson	1965	
Old Federal Building‡		8033	107 N. Vale St. 32°45′23″N 94°20′44″W	Jefferson	1965	
Old Federal Court and Post Office Building†‡	More images	8034	223 W. Austin St. 32°45′20″N 94°20′45″W	Jefferson	1966	
Old Home of Geo. Keese	More images	8062	112 S. Friou St. 32°45′38″N 94°21′9″W	Jefferson	1966	
Old Livery Stable‡		8066	201 W. Austin St. 32°45′22″N 94°20′43″W	Jefferson	1968	
Old Rosebud Saloon‡		8082	205 N. Vale St. 32°45′22″N 94°20′44″W	Jefferson	1965	
Perry Woods Home†‡	More images	8104	502 E. Walker St. 32°45′33″N 94°21′0″W	Jefferson	1965	
Plantation House‡		8087	211 N. Market St. 32°45′24″N 94°20′52″W	Jefferson	1966	
Planters Bank†‡	More images	8078	224 E. Walnut St. 32°45′26″N 94°20′42″W	Jefferson	1965	
Presbyterian Church‡	More images	8080	501 E. Jefferson St. 32°45′24″N 94°20′59″W	Jefferson	1966	
Preston Home		8073	412 N. Soda St. 32°45′40″N 94°20′44″W	Jefferson	1966	
R. B. Walker House	More images	8102	524 N. Polk St. 32°45′38″N 94°20′52″W	Jefferson	1990	
Red River Warehouse		8081	Lake St. near Walnut	Jefferson	1965	
Rogers Home†‡	More images	8068	401 Delta St. 32°45′27″N 94°21′3″W	Jefferson	1966	
Rogers Home‡		8071	403 E. Walker St. 32°45′35″N 94°21′4″W	Jefferson	1966	
Rowell Family Home‡	More images	8028	202 E. Dixon St. 32°45′37″N 94°21′13″W	Jefferson	1966	
Rowell Home‡		8083	307 N. Vale St. 32°45′29″N 94°20′51″W	Jefferson	1966	
S. D. Rainey Home‡		8092	109 W. Henderson St. 32°45′29″N 94°20′49″W	Jefferson	1966	
Sagamore‡		8085	201 E. Dixon St. 32°45′38″N 94°21′13″W	Jefferson	1966	
Schluter Home‡		8086	602 Taylor St. 32°45′18″N 94°20′57″W	Jefferson	1965	
Sedberry, Mrs. Ruth, Home†‡	More images	14947	211 N. Market St. 32°45′24″N 94°20′51″W	Jefferson	1966	
Singleton Family Home†	More images	8088	401 N. Soda St. 32°45′37″N 94°21′21″W	Jefferson	1966	
St. Louis Commission Company Warehouse		8089		Jefferson	1962	
Stilley-Young House†		13675	405 Moseley St. 32°45′22″N 94°21′5″W	Jefferson	2006	405 Moseley St
T. J. Taylor Jr. Home		8091	209 E. Broadway St. 32°45′42″N 94°21′11″W	Jefferson	1964	
Terry, R.S., Home‡		14632	109 W. Henderson St. 32°45′29″N 94°20′49″W	Jefferson	1966	
The Figures House‡		8035	407 E. Jefferson St. 32°45′24″N 94°21′3″W	Jefferson	1973	
The Homestead‡	More images	8048	410 Delta St. 32°45′26″N 94°21′2″W	Jefferson	1965	
The House of the Seasons†‡	More images	8049	409 S. Alley St. 32°45′27″N 94°21′6″W	Jefferson	1962	
"The Magnolias"†	More images	8067	209 E. Broadway St. 32°45′42″N 94°21′10″W	Jefferson	1965	
The Marsh Place‡		8070	202 S. Friou St. 32°45′37″N 94°21′9″W	Jefferson	1972	
The Thurman Place‡		8094	207 S. Alley St. 32°45′36″N 94°21′7″W	Jefferson	1972	
Todd-Terhune Residence‡		8097	310 E. Jefferson St. 32°45′22″N 94°21′6″W	Jefferson	1978	
Union Missionary Baptist Church		17064	520 Houston St. 32°45′0″N 94°20′48″W	Jefferson	2011	520 Houston Street, Jefferson
W. S. Terry Home		8093	404 N. Walnut St. 32°45′36″N 94°20′45″W	Jefferson	1966	
William Clark Residence‡		8023	201 W. Henderson St. 32°45′28″N 94°20′49″W	Jefferson	1981	

== Martin County ==
Registered Texas Historic Landmark	Image	Marker number	Physical address	Nearest city	Year designated	Description
Carmelite Monastery†		12545	400 E. Carpenter St. 32°8′2″N 101°47′21″W	Stanton	2000	
Connell House		12046	410 N. Convent St. 32°8′0″N 101°47′20″W	Stanton	1997	
J. E. Millhollon Ranch House		2674	I-20 Bus. 0.5 mi. E of town 32°8′11″N 101°46′25″W	Stanton	1974	From Stanton, take US 80 about .5 mile East.
Kelly Home		15107		Stanton	1962	
Old Martin County Jail		3762	300 N. St. Joseph St. 32°7′53″N 101°47′29″W	Stanton	1982	300 St. Joseph St., Stanton
Sister of Mercy Convent/Carmelite Monastery†		4715	400 E. Carpenter St. 32°8′2″N 101°47′21″W	Stanton	2000	301 E. Carpenter St. Stanton

== See also ==
Recorded Texas Historic Landmarks listed by county
Anderson-Callahan • Cameron-Duval • Eastland-Gray • Grayson-Hudspeth • Hunt-Martin • Mason-Rusk • Sabine-Travis • Trinity-Zavala
