= Wells Fargo Building (Lubbock, Texas) =

Coordinates: 33.5850°N 101.8519°W

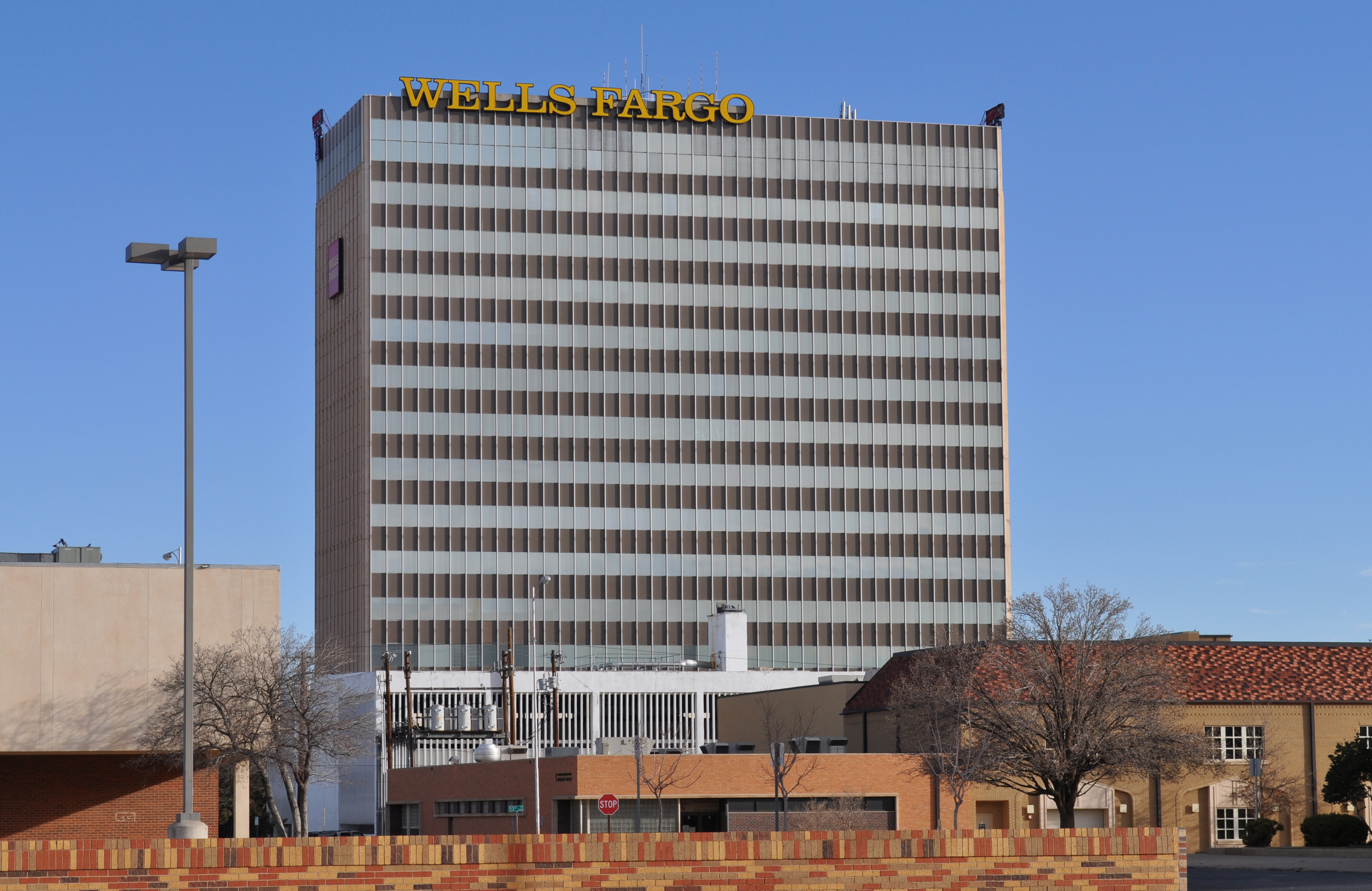
- Interactive map of the Wells Fargo Building area

General information
- Location: Lubbock, Texas
- Completed: 1968
- Owner: Wells Fargo

Height
- Antenna spire: 258 ft (79 m)
- Roof: 208 ft (63 m)
- Top floor: restaurant, pvt. club (both closed)

Technical details
- Floor count: 15 (above ground)
- Lifts/elevators: 6 (4 public, 2 pvt)

The Wells Fargo Building also known as Wells Fargo Center is an office building located at 1500 Broadway Street in Lubbock, Texas. According to Emporis the building is the 2nd tallest in Lubbock, behind only the Metro Tower. The building's basement is one of the largest fallout shelters in Texas and reportedly could shelter occupants from a 10-megaton nuclear weapon air burst over Reese AFB (now closed) 11 miles to the West. The building's roof is capable of supporting a helicopter landing pad. A water main break in January 2009 caused the building to be evacuated and temporarily closed.
