= Cactus Theater =

Theater in Lubbock, Texas

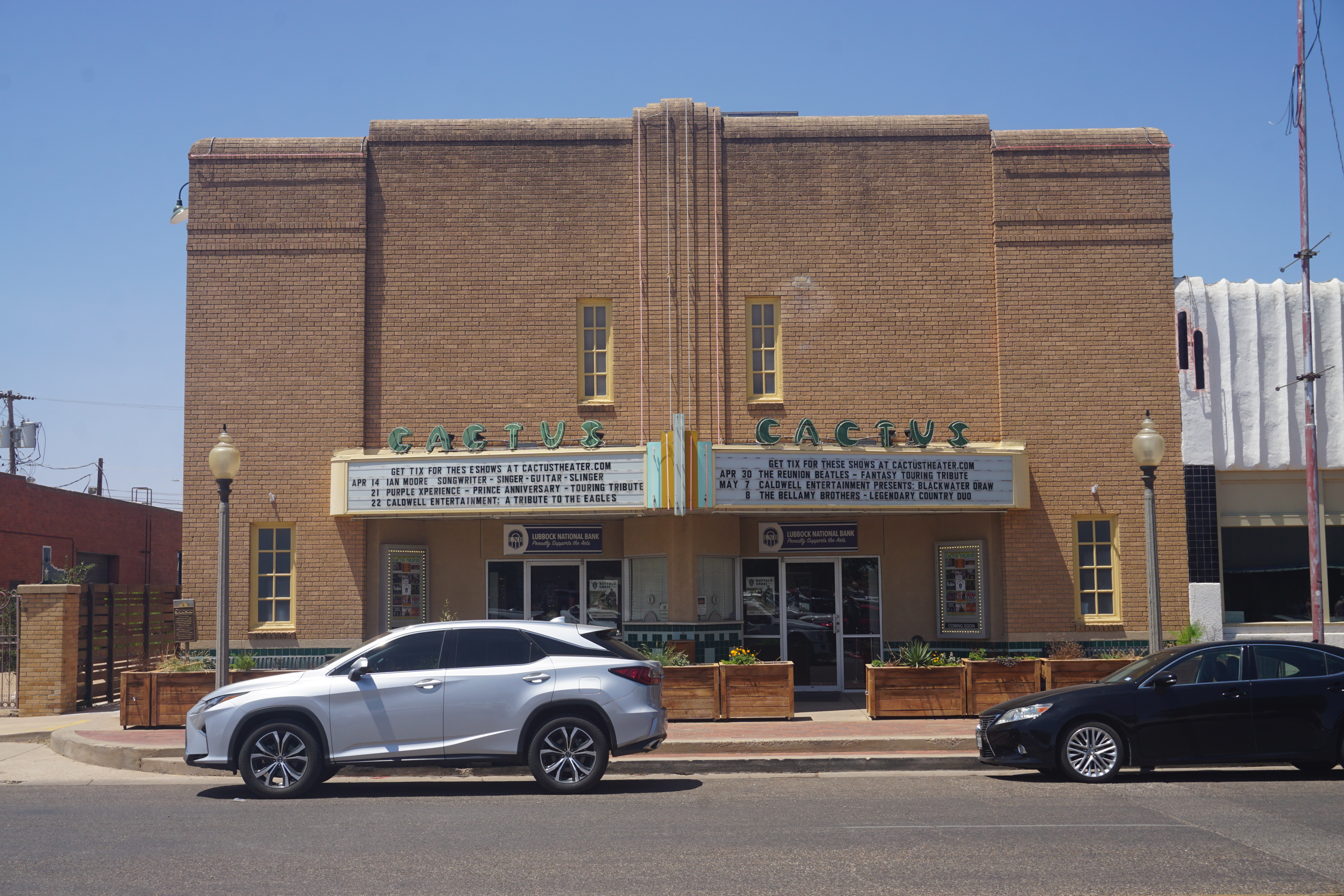
- Interactive map of Cactus Theater
- Address: 1812 Buddy Holly Avenue; Lubbock, Texas; U.S.
- Coordinates: 33.57839°N 101.84473°W
- Owner: Cactus Theater Inc.
- Capacity: 426
- Type: Movie theater
- Screen: 1
- Current use: Cinema, live event venue

Construction
- Built: 1938
- Opened: 1938
- Reopened: 1995
- Architect: Robert Maxey

Website
- www.cactustheater.com
- Cactus Theater
- U.S. National Register of Historic Places
- Location within Texas Location within the United States
- Area: less than one acre
- Architectural style: Art Deco
- NRHP reference No.: 98000447
- Added to NRHP: May 8, 1998

The Cactus Theater is a theater in Lubbock, Texas. It hosts live music productions, musicals, and theatrical plays.

== History ==
In 1938, Lubbock businessmen Joe H. Bryant, M. A. Sanders, and Glenn Woody built Lubbock's first suburban neighborhood movie theater. The Art Deco style theater was designed by architect Robert Maxey. The theater was built as a "second-run" movie theater and boasted a seating capacity of 720. It also had "washed air" cooling and a marquee with over 750 feet of neon lighting.

The Cactus remained opened for twenty years. However, by 1957, there were seventeen movie theaters in the city. The competition from the other traditional theaters and the popularity of six new drive-in theaters forced the older Cactus out of business. The Cactus closed on May 6, 1958.

== Remodeled theater ==
As part of the development of Lubbock's Depot District in 1993, Don Caldwell, along with a group of investors, bought the Cactus Theater and refurbished it into a live performance/movie theater. The refurbished theater retains its original balcony and slope on the bottom floor - and a full stage was added in the re-birthing process. The original wooden seating was eventually replaced with 383 modern seats. The old projection booth was redesigned with spotlights. The theater's West Texas heritage was recognized with murals on both walls, painted by artist John Russell Thomasson, depicting Caprock Canyon.

After re-opening in the mid-’90s and through mid-2016, the theater featured shows such as Nostalgia Nights, Cactus Family Christmas Celebration, Gospel Night, Cactus Cuties local artist showcase, new artist showcase and The JD's, a doo wop group founded by the late Don Allison, a musician and producer at the Cactus. Texas-based artists like Joe Ely, B. J. Thomas, Gary Morris, Jerry Jeff Walker, and The Maines Brothers Band played at the venue during this time. Also during this time period, the theater featured live theatrical plays including Fiddler on the Roof, The Odd Couple, Jesus Christ Superstar, Buddy - The Buddy Holly Story, The Rainmaker, Hello Dolly!, Oklahoma! and more. The Cactus also played host to several debut musical plays from local writers, such as Heavenly Country and Holy Rock ‘n Rollers.

== Cactus Cuties ==
No longer singing as a group, the girls of The Cactus Cuties were one of the many popular acts at the Cactus Theater. These singing girls were coached and managed by Cameron Caldwell at Terri Caldwell Music. Originally, the Cactus Cuties were Baylee Barrett, Blaire Elbert, Andi Kitten, and Madeline Powell. In the summer of 2007 the Cuties were invited to guest star on Disney Channel's "Cory in The House" which aired around the same time their first YouTube video went viral in early 2008. The video featured five Cactus Cuties (one of whom no longer sung with the group) singing their own rendition of the "Star-Spangled Banner" and captured the hearts of over three million people in one month. Their unique and amazing harmonies as well as their character and charm made the girls very popular on the internet. As of 2017, the video has over 10 million views.

The Cactus Theater continues to host programs such as the Holly Ave and the Cactus Kids aimed toward developing young talent and upcoming artists.

The Cactus Cuties performed on The Rachael Ray Show, Jerry Lewis MDA Telethon, National Day of Prayer at Cannon House Office Building in the District of Columbia, and Oprah Winfrey's Search for the Most Talented Kids. Their singing is also available on a compact disc and a DVD both titled Cactus Cuties: Live at the Cactus 2009. For personal reasons, Andi Kitten decided it was time to leave the group in September 2010. Makenzie Patton joined the remaining three girls shortly thereafter.

== See also ==
- National Register of Historic Places listings in Lubbock County, Texas
- Lubbock Post Office and Federal Building
- Silent Wings Museum
