= KRFE =

- Lubbock, Texas; United States
- Frequency: 580 kHz
- Branding: KRFE AM 580 / 95.9 FM

Programming
- Format: News/Talk
- Affiliations: Fox News Radio; Radio America; Westwood One

Ownership
- Owner: KRFE Radio, Inc.

History
- First air date: 1953; 73 years ago
- Former call signs: KDAV; KRLB; KJBX

Technical information
- Licensing authority: FCC
- Facility ID: 60804
- Class: B
- Power: 500 watts (day); 290 watts (night)
- Transmitter coordinates: 33°32′00″N 101°49′14″W
- Translator: 95.9 K240FA (Lubbock)

Links
- Public license information: Public file; LMS
- Webcast: Listen Live
- Website: KRFE Online

KRFE (580 AM) is a radio station licensed to Lubbock, Texas, serving Lubbock and the surrounding South Plains region. KRFE is owned by KRFE Radio, Inc.

== History ==
The station traces its history to KDAV, which went on air in 1953. Buddy Holly, who regularly performed on KDAV before becoming an international superstar. KRFE's current programming combines locally produced talk programming with nationally syndicated programming. Its local programming focuses on Lubbock and West Texas and includes community affairs, agriculture, oil and gas, veterans' issues and other regional topics.

The original KDAV on 580 AM went on the air September 19, 1953. The Texas State Historical Association says it is "generally agreed" that KDAV was the first station anywhere to program 100% country music. The Country Radio Hall of Fame is even more direct: it credits founder of KDAV, Dave "Pappy" Stone with establishing the nation's first full-time country music station.

== Staff ==
Wade Wilkes is the owner of KRFE and a longtime Lubbock broadcaster. He hosts The Wade Wilkes Morning Show and remains involved in the station's daily programming. Tony Thulin serves as KRFE's general manager and is involved in several of the station's locally produced programs, including The Vet Show and Arms & Ammo Radio. Mike Dalby is an on-air personality at KRFE. Tim Snyder hosts West Texas AG, Oil & Gas, covering agriculture, energy and other issues affecting producers and businesses across West Texas. Steve Burns co-hosts Arms & Ammo Radio.

Broadcast translator for KRFE
Call sign	Frequency	City of license	FID	ERP (W)	HAAT	Class	Transmitter coordinates	FCC info
K240FA	95.9 FM	Lubbock, Texas	202886	99	94 m (308 ft)	D	33°32′1.3″N 101°49′13.6″W	LMS
