= Crosbyton-Southplains Railroad =

- Railroad map of Texas, 1926

Overview
- Headquarters: Lubbock, Texas
- Dates of operation: 1910–1915
- Successor: Santa Fe Railroad

Technical
- Length: 38.4 miles including 5.2 miles of yard track and sidings

The Crosbyton-South Plains Railroad, also known as the South Plains and Santa Fe railroad, was a railroad which operated from Crosbyton, Texas, to Lubbock, Texas, between the years of 1910 and 1948.

== History ==
The railroad was chartered on April 6, 1910. The initial capital was $150,000 and the first board of directors consisted of Julian M. Bassett, Roger M. Bassett, William D. Petzel, and Joseph C. Johnson, of Crosbyton, Texas; Avery Coonley of Riverside, Illinois; and John S. Coonley and Prentiss L. Coonley, of Chicago, Illinois with the principal office located in Crosbyton. The intent was to construct two lines, totaling 120 miles. The first line was to run Crosbyton to Lubbock, Texas, and the second from Crosbyton to Plainview, Texas. The Crosbyton to Lubbock line was completed in early 1911 and consisted of 38.4 miles of main line track and 5.2 miles of yard track and sidings. Construction never began on the second line from Crosbyton to Plainview. The Crosbyton-South Plains' first run occurred on April 10, 1911, departing from Crosbyton with service to Lubbock. The nearly 39 mile long line ran through the towns of Ralls, Texas, Lorenzo, Texas, and Idalou, Texas, before reaching Lubbock. At its peak, the Crosbyton-South Plains operated one steam locomotive, 2 passenger cars and 2 freight cars.

In 1912, the railroad was ordered to construct a depot in Ralls by the Railroad Commission.

On August 1, 1915, the Atchison, Topeka and Santa Fe Railroad purchased Crosbyton-South Plains, later renaming it to the South Plains and Santa Fe Railroad on August 17, 1916. At this point in time, the principal office was moved to Lubbock, with the board of directors including Atchison, Topeka and Santa Fe Railway President E. P. Ripley.

On July 1, 1917, the Panhandle and Santa Fe Railroad leased the original C-SP line, along with all of Atchison, Topeka and Santa Fe's other holdings. Operations continued until 1948 when the Panhandle and Santa Fe Railroad merged with the parent company, the Santa Fe Railway. The former South Plains and Santa Fe holdings were disposed by Santa Fe, bringing about the end of the original Crosbyton-South Plains Railroad.

In January 1990, the original Crosbyton-South Plains line was sold to the Crosbyton Railroad. Operations ceased in under one year due to a lack of business.

Today, remnants of the original Crosbyton-South Plains Railroad can still be found in and around Lubbock, Texas. Pieces of the main line to the West, once running to Crosbyton, can still be seen along East Municipal Drive in Lubbock. Main line track still exists, connecting to the Burlington Northern & Santa Fe Railway lines running through Lubbock. Not much else is left of the original Crosbyton-South Plains Railroad.
