= Covenant Health System =

American health care provider

Coordinates: 33.5769°N 101.8919°W

Covenant Health System is an American health care provider which serves West Texas and Eastern New Mexico. It has about 1,300 beds in its five primary acute-care and specialty hospitals; it also manages about a dozen affiliated community hospitals. Covenant Health System, part of the St. Joseph Health System (since 2016: Providence St. Joseph Health), also maintains a network of family health care and medical clinics. Covenant Health System's major facilities are Covenant Medical Center, Covenant Specialty Hospital, and Covenant Children's Hospital. The health system also includes some 20 clinics and 50 physician practices, and its extensive outreach programs target isolated rural communities with mobile services. Covenant Health was founded in 1998 through the merger of two of Lubbock's health care facilities, St. Mary of the Plains Hospital and the Lubbock Methodist Hospital System.

== History ==
In 1918 the thirty-five bed Lubbock Sanitarium, was established, by Drs. J. T. Hutchinson, O.F. Peebler and A. R. Ponton on land donated by Dr. Marvin Cartwell Overton. In 1942 it was incorporated as Lubbock General Hospital, and renamed Lubbock Memorial Hospital in honor of soldiers from Lubbock who died during World War II. In 1953 the hospital opened in a new facility on 19th Street with the name Methodist Hospital under ownership of the Northwest Texas Conference of the United Methodist Church. In the late 1980s and in the 1990s, Methodist Hospital completed mergers that expanded its presence to nearby Levelland and Plainview. Methodist Hospital is now known as "Covenant Medical Center".

In 1937 a small group of doctors in Lubbock, Texas founded the 10-bed Plains Hospital and Clinic. However, founders Frank B. Malone Sr., Olan Key and Sam Arnett preferred practicing medicine to handling hospital administration. They contacted the Sisters of St. Joseph of Orange, California, who had experience in operating hospitals. In 1939 The sisters purchased the hospital; it was agreed that the founding doctors would continue to manage the clinic. The hospital was then named St. Mary of the Plains Hospital, which displays a floor medallion with the initials MKA commemorating the original founders. St. Mary of the Plains Hospital is now known as "Covenant Medical Center–Lakeside".

Covenant Health was created in 1998 when Methodist Hospital and St. Mary of the Plains merged.

In 2009 Grace Health System doing business as Grace Medical Center acquired the 123-bed acute care Highland Community Hospital in Lubbock. In February 2018, Covenant Health acquired Grace Health System, which includes Grace Medical Center and Grace Clinic in Lubbock.

== Services ==
Covenant Health serves West Texas and Eastern New Mexico, and includes seven hospitals, more than 1,100 beds, more than 5,000 employees and more than 600 staff physicians.

More than 600 physicians treat over 38,000 annual admissions, and over 100,000 emergency room visits through a number of specialty treatment centers. Covenant Heart and Vascular Institute, Covenant NeuroScience Institute, Joe Arrington Cancer Research and Treatment Center, and Women's Hospital.

== Schools ==
The health system has a school of nursing, school of radiography, and school of surgical technology.
