= John Frullo =

American politician (born 1962)

Member of the Texas House of Representatives from the 84th district
- In office November 22, 2010 – January 10, 2023
- Preceded by: Carl Isett
- Succeeded by: Carl Tepper

Personal details
- Born: John Michael Frullo; August 27, 1962 (age 64)
- Party: Republican
- Children: 2
- Education: University of Wyoming
- Occupation: Accountant; Business owner
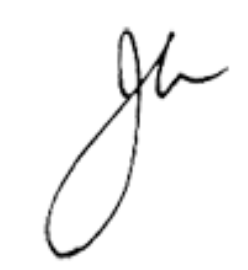
- Signature

John Michael Frullo (born August 27, 1962) is a Republican politician who represents District 84 in the Texas House of Representatives.

== Personal life ==
John M. Frullo was born on August 27, 1962, and graduated in 1984 with a degree in accounting from the University of Wyoming. He has two adult sons. For several years, Frullo worked as a CPA auditing government entities and businesses. In 1993, he purchased a printing business in Lubbock, Texas. Currently, he owns a commercial printing, design, and advertisement company known as Midtown Printing and Graphics, Inc.

== Political career ==
Frullo, a Republican, was sworn in to represent district 84 in the Texas House of Representatives on November 22, 2010, succeeding Carl Isett. District 84 includes the majority of Lubbock, including most of central Lubbock. Representative Frullo serves on the Higher Education Committee and the Culture Recreation and Tourism Committee. Frullo has previously served on International Relations and Economic Development Committee, State Affairs Committee, Insurance Committee, and the Calendars Committee.

Texas House of Representatives
Preceded by Carl Isett	Texas State Representative for District 84; 2010–present	Succeeded by Incumbent
