= Lubbock, Texas =

City in Texas, United States

- City
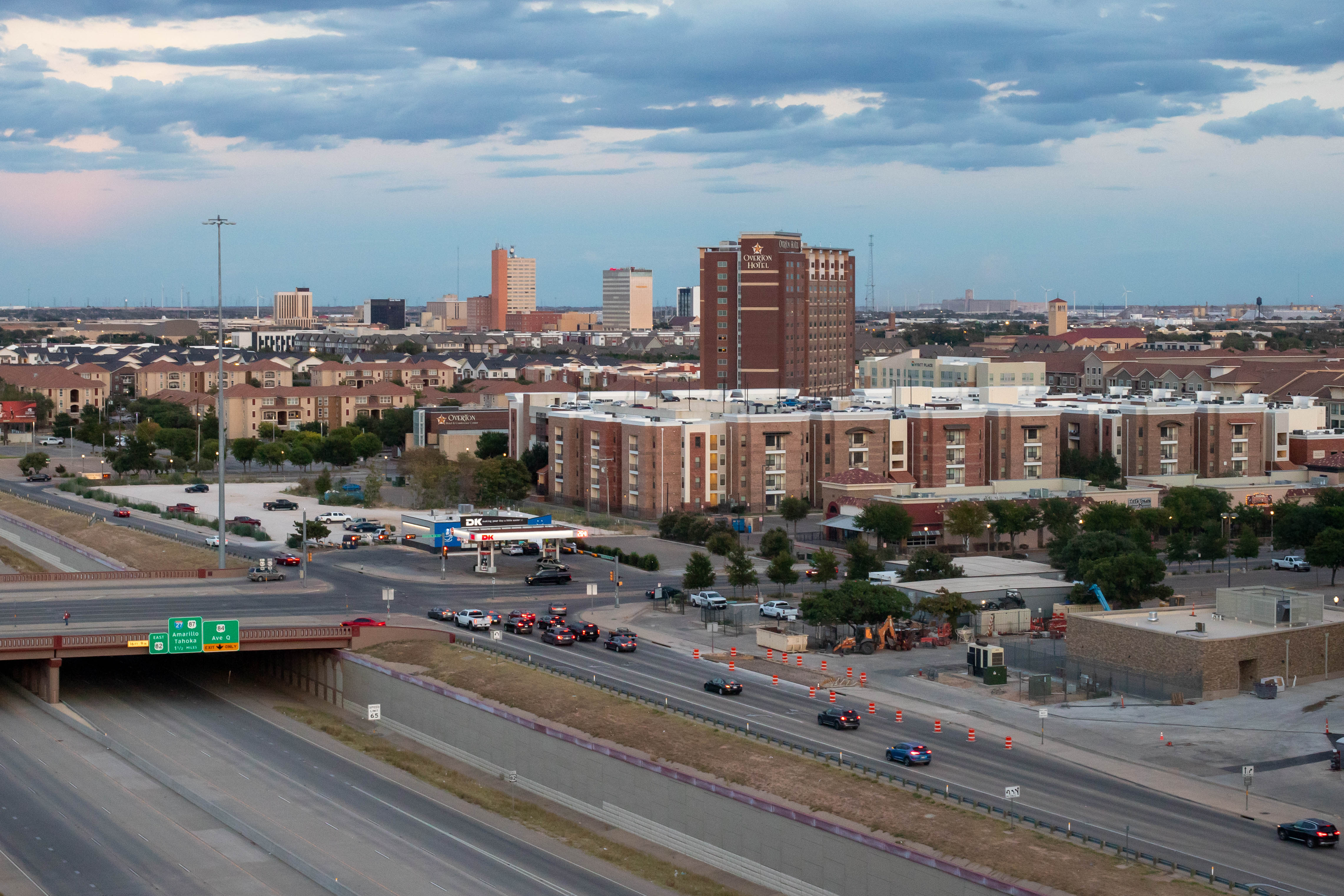
- Downtown Lubbock in 2024

- Flag Logo
- Nickname: Hub City
- Interactive map of Lubbock, Texas
- Location within Texas Location within the United States
- Coordinates: 33°35′06″N 101°50′42″W
- Country: United States
- State: Texas
- County: Lubbock
- Settled: 1889
- Incorporated: March 16, 1909
- Named for: Thomas Saltus Lubbock

Government
  - Type: Council–manager
  - Mayor: Mark McBrayer (R)
  - City manager: W. Jarrett Atkinson

Area
  - City: 135.85 sq mi (351.85 km^{2})
  - Land: 134.61 sq mi (348.63 km^{2})
  - Water: 1.24 sq mi (3.22 km^{2})
- Elevation: 3,202 ft (976 m)

Population (2020)
  - City: 257,141
  - Estimate (2025): 273,071 ▲
  - Rank: 84th in the United States; 10th in Texas
  - Density: 2,021.4/sq mi (780.5/km^{2})
  - Urban: 272,280 (US: 150th)
  - Urban density: 2,562/sq mi (989.2/km^{2})
  - Metro: 367,109 (US: 154th)
  - CSA: 404,104 (US: 103rd)
- Demonym: Lubbockite
- Time zone: UTC−6 (CST)
  - Summer (DST): UTC−5 (CDT)
- ZIP Codes: 79401–79416, 79423–79424, 79430, 79452–79453, 79457, 79464, 79490–79491, 79493, 79499
- Area code: 806
- FIPS code: 48-45000
- GNIS feature ID: 1374760
- Website: www.mylubbock.us

Lubbock (/ˈlʌbək/ LUB-ək) is a city in the U.S. state of Texas and the county seat of Lubbock County. With a population of 257,141 at the 2020 census (estimated at 273,071 in 2025), Lubbock is the 10th-most populous city in Texas and the 84th-most populous in the United States. The city is in the northwestern part of the state, in the Great Plains region, an area known historically and geographically as the Llano Estacado, and ecologically is part of the southern end of the High Plains, lying at the economic center of the Lubbock metropolitan area, which had an estimated population of 367,109 in 2024.

Lubbock's nickname, "Hub City", derives from it being the economic, educational, and healthcare hub of the multicounty region, located north of the Permian Basin and south of the Texas Panhandle, commonly called the South Plains. The area is the largest contiguous cotton-growing region in the world and is heavily dependent on water from the Ogallala Aquifer for irrigation. Lubbock is home to Texas Tech University, the sixth-largest college by enrollment in the state.

== History ==
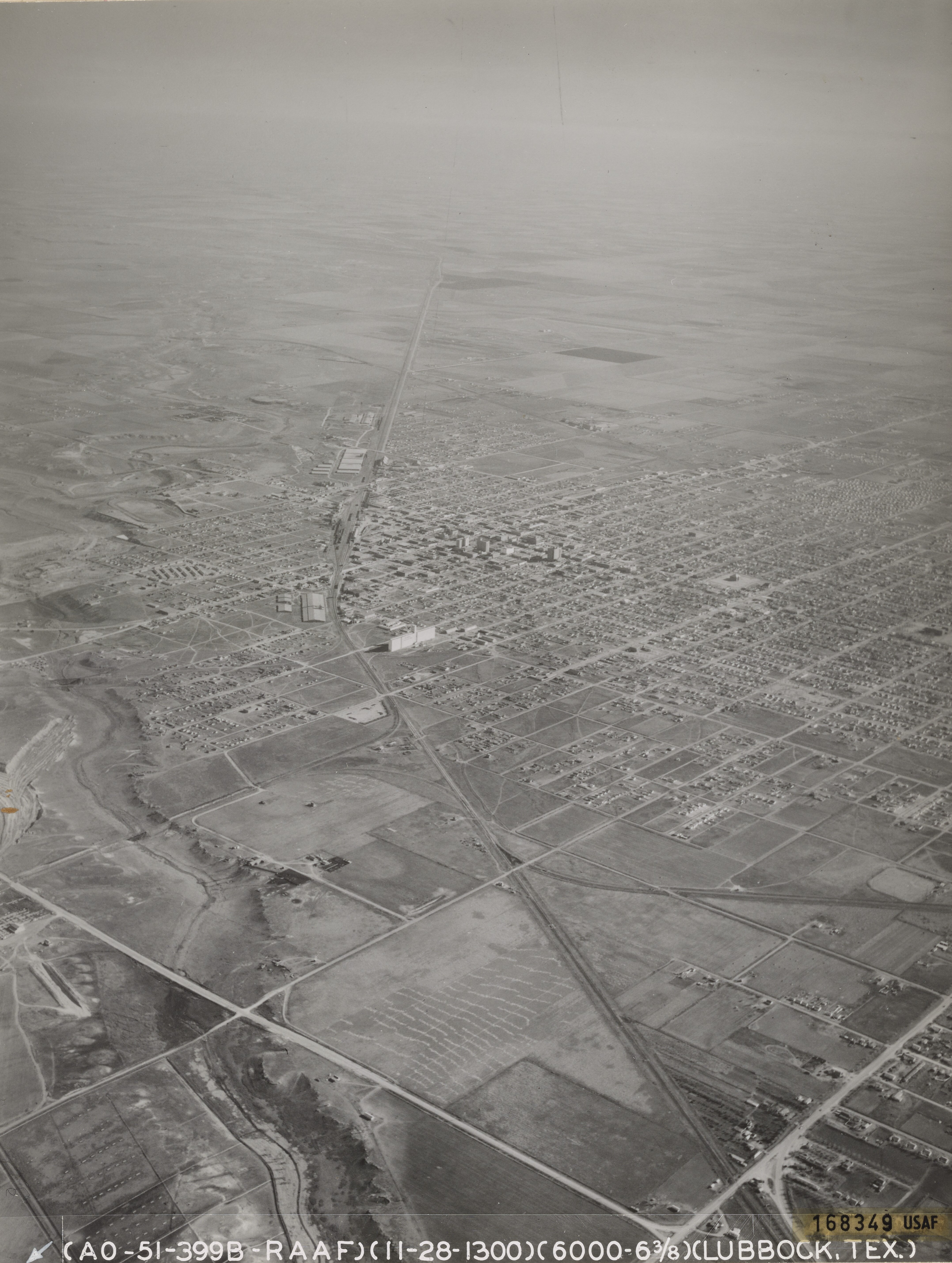
Lubbock in 1928

In 1867, the land that would become Lubbock was the heart of Comancheria, the shifting domain controlled by the Comanche.

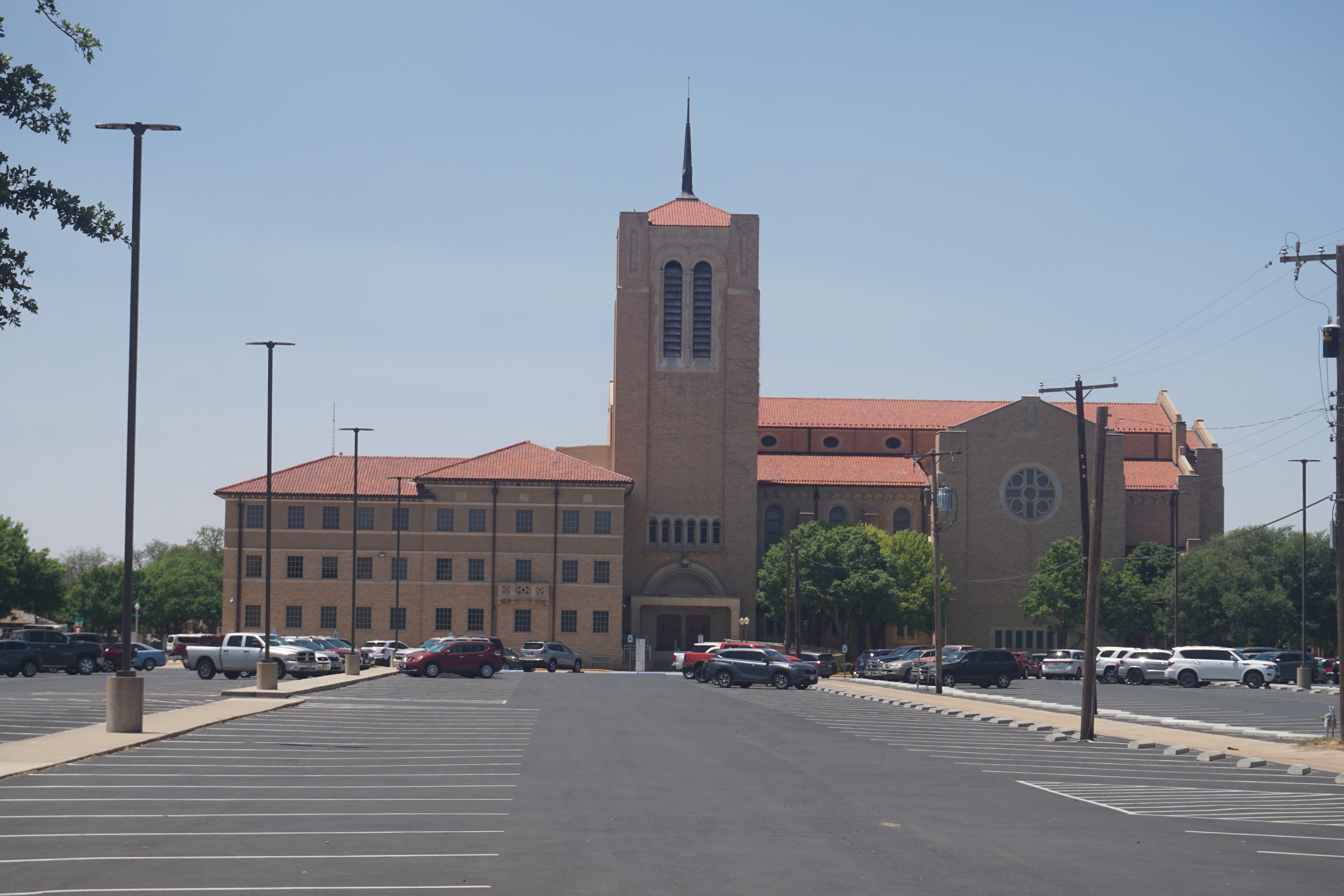
Lubbock has a large number of churches, including the downtown First Baptist congregation.

Lubbock County was founded in 1876. It was named after Thomas Saltus Lubbock, former Texas Ranger and brother of Francis Lubbock, governor of Texas during the Civil War. As early as 1884, a U.S. post office existed in Yellow House Canyon. A small town, known as Old Lubbock, Lubbock, or North Town, was established about three miles to the east. In 1890, the original Lubbock merged with Monterey, another small town south of the canyon. The new town adopted the Lubbock name. The merger included moving the original Lubbock's Nicolett Hotel across the canyon on rollers to the new townsite. Lubbock became the county seat in 1891, and was incorporated on March 16, 1909. In the same year, the first railroad train arrived.

Texas Technological College (now Texas Tech University) was founded in Lubbock in 1923. A separate university, Texas Tech University Health Sciences Center, opened as Texas Tech University School of Medicine in 1969. Both universities are now overseen by the Texas Tech University System, after it was established in 1996 and based in Lubbock. Lubbock Christian University, founded in 1957, affiliated with the Churches of Christ, has its main campus in the city. South Plains College and Wayland Baptist University operate branch campuses in Lubbock.

At one time, Lubbock was home to Reese Air Force Base, located 6 mi (10 km) west of the city. It was established in August 1941, during the defense build-up prior to World War II (1941–1945), by the United States Department of War and the U.S. Army as Lubbock Army Airfield. It served the old U.S. Army Air Forces, and later the U.S. Air Force (USAF), after reorganization and establishment in 1947. The USAF base's primary mission throughout its existence was pilot training. The base was closed 30 September 1997, after being selected for closure by the Base Realignment and Closure Commission in 1995, and is now a research and business park called Reese Technology Center.

The city is home to the Lubbock Lake Landmark, part of the Museum of Texas Tech University. The landmark is an archaeological and natural-history preserve at the northern edge of the city. It shows evidence of almost 12,000 years of human occupation in the region. The National Ranching Heritage Center, also part of the Museum of Texas Tech University, houses historic ranch-related structures from the region.

During World War II, airmen cadets from the Royal Air Force, flying from their training base at Terrell, Texas, routinely flew to Lubbock on training flights. The town served as a stand-in for the British for Cork, Ireland, which was the same distance from London, England, as Lubbock is from Terrell.

In August 1951, a V-shaped formation of lights was seen over the city. The "Lubbock Lights" series of sightings received national publicity and is regarded as one of the first great "UFO" cases. The sightings were considered credible because they were witnessed by several respected science professors at Texas Technological College and were photographed by a Texas Tech student. The photographs were reprinted nationwide in newspapers and in Life. Project Blue Book, the USAF's official investigation of the UFO mystery, concluded the photographs were not a hoax and showed genuine objects, but dismissed the UFOs as being either "night-flying moths" or a type of bird called a plover reflected in the nighttime glow of Lubbock's new street lights.

In 1960, the U.S. Census Bureau reported Lubbock's population as 128,691 and area as 75.0 sq mi (194 km^{2}).

On May 11, 1970, the Lubbock Tornado struck the city. Twenty-six people died, and damage was estimated at $125 million. The Metro Tower (NTS Building), then known as the Great Plains Life Building, at 274 ft (84 m) in height, is believed to have been the tallest building ever to survive a direct hit from an F5 tornado.

During the late 1970s to mid-1980s, Texas Instruments was a major Lubbock employer, manufacturing consumer electronics – including early calculators, digital watches, and TI-99 series home computers. In the early 1980s, shipping up to 5,000 computers a day from the Lubbock factory, TI briefly dominated the U.S. home computer market.

In August, 1988, tens of thousands of people came to Lubbock, drawn by an apparition of Mary.

On August 12, 2008, the Lubbock Chamber of Commerce announced they would lead the effort to get enough signatures to have a vote on allowing county-wide packaged alcohol sales. The petition effort was successful and the question was put to the voters. On May 9, 2009, Proposition 1, which expanded the sale of packaged alcohol in Lubbock County, passed by a margin of nearly two to one, with 64.5% in favor. Proposition 2, which legalized the sale of mixed drinks in restaurants county-wide, passed with 69.5% in favor. On September 23, 2009, The Texas Alcoholic Beverage Commission issued permits to more than 80 stores in Lubbock. Prior to May 9, 2009, Lubbock County allowed "package" sales of alcohol (sales of bottled liquor from liquor stores), but not "by the drink" sales, except at private establishments such as country clubs. Inside the city limits, the situation was reversed, with restaurants and bars able to serve alcohol, but liquor stores forbidden.

After news broke about Planned Parenthood of Greater Texas hiring for a Lubbock location, Senator Charles Perry started a petition to keep Planned Parenthood out of Lubbock. On September 9, 2020, Senator Perry held a press conference with Representative Dustin Burrows and Representative John Frullo in support of Lubbock becoming a "sanctuary city for the unborn" through the passage of an ordinance, written by anti-abortion activist Mark Lee Dickson, which would outlaw abortion within the city limits. On November 17, 2020, the Lubbock City Council voted 7–0 against the ordinance outlawing abortion, leading the "sanctuary city for the unborn" initiating committee to file for the ordinance to be placed on the May ballot. Planned Parenthood began offering abortion services on April 15, 2021, with early voting taking place on April 19, 2021. On May 1, 2021, the citizens of Lubbock voted on the ordinance with 62% in favor and 38% against, becoming the largest "sanctuary city for the unborn" in the nation. Planned Parenthood filed a lawsuit in an attempt to stop the ordinance from going into effect, but lost their case after the ordinance went into effect on June 1, 2021, and a federal judge dismissed the case. Planned Parenthood later appealed the decision to the 5th Circuit Court of Appeals, but in January 2022 withdrew their appeal.

== Geography ==
Lubbock is considered to be the center of the Llano Estacado portion of the South Plains, with Midland on the southern edge, and Amarillo denoting the northern boundary. According to the United States Census Bureau, as of 2022, the city has a total area of 135.85 sq mi (351.85 km^{2}), of which 134.605 sq mi (348.63 km^{2}) (99.08%) are land and 1.244 sq mi (3.22 km^{2}), or (0.92%), is covered by water. The population density was 1,900 inhabitants per square mile (730/km^{2}).

=== Skyline ===
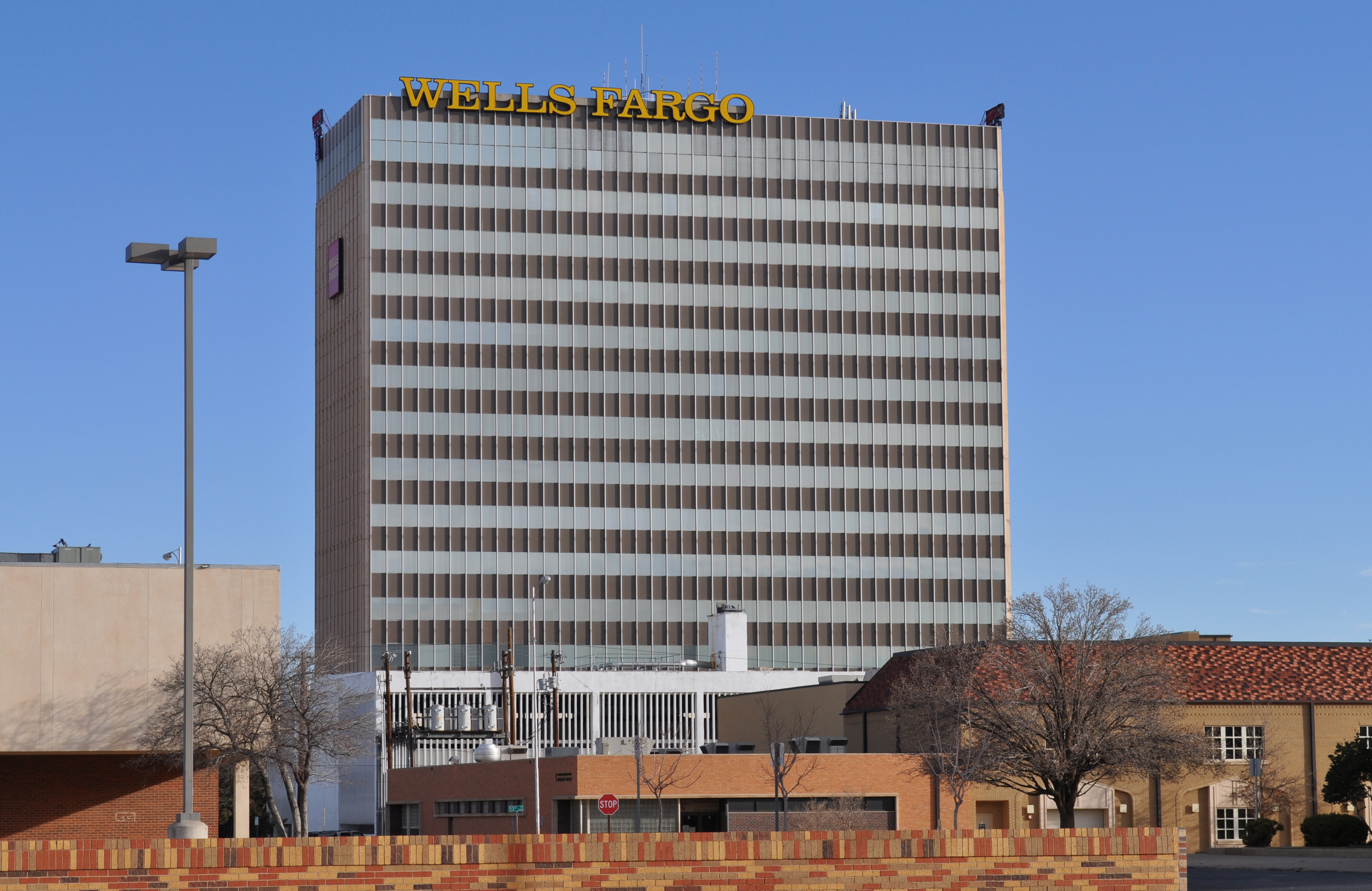
The Wells Fargo Building is the second-tallest building in Lubbock.

The tallest buildings in Lubbock are listed below.

Rank	Name	Height ft / m	Floors (Stories)	Year Completed
1	NTS Tower	274/84	20	1955
2	Wells Fargo Building	209/64	15	1968
3	TTU Media and Communication Building	208/63	12	1969
4	Overton Hotel	165/50	15	2009
5	TTU Architecture Building	158/48	10	1971
6	Citizens Tower	153/46.5	11	1963
7	Park Tower	150/46	15	1968
–	Caprock Hilton Hotel (demolished)	144/44	12	1929
8	Lubbock County Office Building	143/44	12	1940
9	Pioneer Hotel	136/41.5	11	1926
10 =	TTU Chitwood Hall	134/41	12	1967
10 =	TTU Coleman Hall	134/41	12	1967
10 =	TTU Weymouth Hall	134/41	12	1967
13	Lubbock National Bank Building	134/41	10	1979
14	Covenant Medical Center	114/34.5	10	1994
15	Mahon Federal Building and U.S. Courthouse	107/33	8	1971
16	Victory Tower	96/29	8	1999

=== Climate ===
Lubbock has a cool semi-arid climate (Köppen classification BSk). On average, Lubbock receives 18.33 in (466 mm) of rain and 7.0 in (0.18 m) of snow per year.

In 2013, Lubbock was named the "Toughest Weather City" in America according to the Weather Channel.

Summers are hot, with 92 afternoons on average of 90 °F (32.2 °C)+ highs and 13.3 afternoons of 100 °F (37.8 °C)+ highs, with lows of 70 °F (21.1 °C)+ on 30 mornings. Lubbock is the 10th-windiest city in the US with an average wind speed of 12.4 mph (20.0 km/h; 5.5 m/s). The highest recorded temperature was 114 °F (45.6 °C) on June 27, 1994.

Winter afternoons in Lubbock are typically sunny and mild, but mornings are cold, with temperatures usually dipping below freezing, and as the city is in USDA Plant Hardiness Zone 7, lows reaching 10 °F or −12.2 °C occur on 1.5 mornings and 4.5 afternoons occur where the temperature fails to rise above freezing. The lowest recorded temperature was −17 °F (−27.2 °C) on February 8, 1933.

Lubbock can experience severe thunderstorms during the spring, and occasionally the summer. The risk of tornadoes and very large hail exists during the spring in particular, as Lubbock sits on the far southwestern edge of Tornado Alley.

Climate data for Lubbock, Texas, 1991–2020 normals, (Note: Mean maxima and minima (i.e., the highest and lowest temperature readings during an entire month or year) calculated based on data at said location from 1991 to 2020.) extremes 1911–present
Month	Jan	Feb	Mar	Apr	May	Jun	Jul	Aug	Sep	Oct	Nov	Dec	Year
Record high °F (°C)	87 (31)	91 (33)	98 (37)	104 (40)	109 (43)	114 (46)	111 (44)	109 (43)	107 (42)	100 (38)	90 (32)	86 (30)	114 (46)
Mean maximum °F (°C)	76.0 (24.4)	80.4 (26.9)	87.3 (30.7)	92.3 (33.5)	98.8 (37.1)	103.1 (39.5)	102.1 (38.9)	100.3 (37.9)	97.0 (36.1)	91.5 (33.1)	82.1 (27.8)	74.9 (23.8)	105.3 (40.7)
Mean daily maximum °F (°C)	55.0 (12.8)	59.7 (15.4)	67.8 (19.9)	76.0 (24.4)	84.2 (29.0)	91.6 (33.1)	93.4 (34.1)	92.2 (33.4)	84.9 (29.4)	75.5 (24.2)	63.8 (17.7)	55.1 (12.8)	74.9 (23.8)
Daily mean °F (°C)	41.1 (5.1)	45.1 (7.3)	53.0 (11.7)	61.2 (16.2)	70.4 (21.3)	78.6 (25.9)	81.2 (27.3)	79.9 (26.6)	72.3 (22.4)	61.8 (16.6)	50.0 (10.0)	41.7 (5.4)	61.4 (16.3)
Mean daily minimum °F (°C)	27.2 (−2.7)	30.6 (−0.8)	38.3 (3.5)	46.3 (7.9)	56.7 (13.7)	65.6 (18.7)	69.0 (20.6)	67.5 (19.7)	59.8 (15.4)	48.1 (8.9)	36.3 (2.4)	28.3 (−2.1)	47.8 (8.8)
Mean minimum °F (°C)	13.4 (−10.3)	15.8 (−9.0)	21.4 (−5.9)	31.1 (−0.5)	41.7 (5.4)	56.1 (13.4)	62.1 (16.7)	59.7 (15.4)	46.6 (8.1)	31.5 (−0.3)	20.0 (−6.7)	12.8 (−10.7)	9.1 (−12.7)
Record low °F (°C)	−16 (−27)	−17 (−27)	−2 (−19)	18 (−8)	27 (−3)	39 (4)	49 (9)	43 (6)	33 (1)	16 (−9)	−1 (−18)	−2 (−19)	−17 (−27)
Average precipitation inches (mm)	0.65 (17)	0.65 (17)	1.10 (28)	1.33 (34)	2.69 (68)	2.58 (66)	1.96 (50)	1.74 (44)	2.55 (65)	1.53 (39)	0.80 (20)	0.75 (19)	18.33 (466)
Average snowfall inches (cm)	1.6 (4.1)	1.4 (3.6)	0.4 (1.0)	0.1 (0.25)	0.0 (0.0)	0.0 (0.0)	0.0 (0.0)	0.0 (0.0)	0.0 (0.0)	0.1 (0.25)	1.0 (2.5)	2.4 (6.1)	7.0 (18)
Average precipitation days (≥ 0.01 in)	3.5	4.2	4.9	4.4	7.0	7.6	5.8	6.4	6.0	5.6	3.7	3.6	62.7
Average snowy days (≥ 0.1 in)	1.6	1.4	0.7	0.1	0.0	0.0	0.0	0.0	0.0	0.2	0.5	1.2	5.7
Average relative humidity (%)	57.9	56.7	49.7	47.2	52.8	55.7	54.5	59.4	64.3	59.3	57.7	59.5	56.2
Mean monthly sunshine hours	210.1	202.9	267.8	286.3	310.7	326.0	338.0	318.6	261.6	258.2	214.7	201.7	3,196.6
Percentage possible sunshine	66	66	72	73	72	76	77	77	71	73	69	65	72
Source: NOAA (sun and relative humidity 1961–1990)

== Demographics ==
Historical population
Census	Pop.	Note	%±
1910	1,938		—
1920	4,051		109.0%
1930	20,520		406.5%
1940	31,853		55.2%
1950	71,747		125.2%
1960	128,691		79.4%
1970	149,101		15.9%
1980	173,979		16.7%
1990	186,206		7.0%
2000	199,564		7.2%
2010	229,573		15.0%
2020	257,141		12.0%
2025 (est.)	273,071	▲	6.2%
U.S. Decennial Census

=== Racial and ethnic composition ===
Note: the US Census treats Hispanic/Latino as an ethnic category. This table excludes Latinos from the racial categories and assigns them to a separate category. Hispanics/Latinos may be of any race.
Race / Ethnicity (NH = Non-Hispanic)	Pop 2000	Pop 2010	Pop 2020	% 2000	% 2010	% 2020
White alone (NH)	122,330	127,915	122,337	61.30%	55.72%	47.58%
Black or African American alone (NH)	16,907	18,744	24,599	8.47%	8.16%	9.57%
Native American or Alaska Native alone (NH)	619	845	1,225	0.31%	0.37%	0.48%
Asian alone (NH)	3,004	5,471	9,236	1.51%	2.38%	3.59%
Pacific Islander alone (NH)	41	147	156	0.02%	0.06%	0.06%
Some Other Race alone (NH)	133	241	811	0.07%	0.10%	0.32%
Mixed race or Multiracial (NH)	1,744	2,585	7,232	0.87%	1.13%	2.81%
Hispanic or Latino (any race)	54,786	73,625	91,545	27.45%	32.07%	35.60%
Total	199,564	229,573	257,141	100.00%	100.00%	100.00%

In 2019, Lubbock had a racial and ethnic makeup of 50.1% non-Hispanic whites, 7.1% Blacks and African Americans, 0.3% American Indians and Alaska Natives, 2.6% Asians, <0.1% Native Hawaiian or other Pacific Islander, 0.1% some other race, and 2.4% two or more races. The Hispanic and Latino American population (of any race) was an estimated 37.4% of the total population. The diversifying population reflected state- and nationwide trends among traditional minority populations.

=== Population ===
According to Move.org in 2016, Lubbock and its metropolitan area was the 6th best for residents aged 20 and older. The Lubbock area was also first in Texas for Millennial home-ownership, and 14th in the U.S. in 2020. The median value of owner-occupied housing units were $152,800 and the gross rent for Lubbock was $976. Lubbockites had a median household income of $52,254 in 2019, and a mean income of $72,144.

In 2011, the estimated median income for a household in the city was $43,364, and for a family was $59,185. Male full-time workers had a median income of $40,445 versus $30,845 for females. The per capita income for the city was $23,092. About 11.4% of families and 20.8% of the population were below the poverty line, including 24.5% of those under age 18 and 7.3% of those age 65 or over.

=== 2020 census ===
As of the 2020 census, Lubbock had a population of 257,141. The median age was 31.8 years. 23.0% of residents were under the age of 18 and 13.4% of residents were 65 years of age or older. For every 100 females there were 95.6 males, and for every 100 females age 18 and over there were 93.3 males age 18 and over.

98.9% of residents lived in urban areas, while 1.1% lived in rural areas.

There were 100,563 households in Lubbock, of which 30.0% had children under the age of 18 living in them. Of all households, 40.0% were married-couple households, 21.8% were households with a male householder and no spouse or partner present, and 30.9% were households with a female householder and no spouse or partner present. About 30.1% of all households were made up of individuals and 9.4% had someone living alone who was 65 years of age or older.

There were 111,247 housing units, of which 9.6% were vacant. The homeowner vacancy rate was 1.5% and the rental vacancy rate was 11.9%.

The racial and ethnic makeup of the city in 2020 was 47.58% non-Hispanic white, 9.57% Black or African American, 0.48% Native American or Alaska Native, 3.59% Asian alone, 0.06% Pacific Islander, 0.32% some other race, 2.81% multiracial, and 35.6% Hispanic or Latino American of any race.

Racial composition as of the 2020 census
Race	Number	Percent
White	152,995	59.5%
Black or African American	26,083	10.1%
American Indian and Alaska Native	2,779	1.1%
Asian	9,423	3.7%
Native Hawaiian and Other Pacific Islander	217	0.1%
Some other race	29,984	11.7%
Two or more races	35,660	13.9%
Hispanic or Latino (of any race)	91,545	35.6%

=== 2010 census ===
At the 2010 United States census, 229,573 people, 88,506 households, and 53,042 families resided in the city.

In 2010, the racial makeup of the city was 75.8% White, 8.6% Black or African American, 0.7% Native American, 2.4% Asian, 0.1% Pacific Islander, 9.9% from other races, and 2.5% from two or more races. Hispanics or Latin Americans of any race were 32.1% of the population. Non-Hispanic whites were 55.7% of the population in 2010, down from 77.2% in 1970.

=== 2000 census ===
At the 2000 U.S. census, 199,564 people, 77,527 households, and 48,531 families resided in the city.

In 2000, the city's racial makeup was 72.9% White, 8.7% African American, 0.6% Native American, 1.5% Asian, <0.1% Pacific Islander, 14.3% from other races, and 2.0% from two or more races. Hispanics or Latinos of any race were 27.5% of the population.

The city's median household income in 2000 was $31,844, and for the median family income was $41,418. Males had a median income of $30,222 versus $21,708 for females. The city's per capita income was $17,511. About 12.0% of families and 18.4% of the population were below the poverty line, including 21.9% of those under age 18 and 10.1% of those age 65 or over.

=== Religion ===
Christianity is the dominant religion in Lubbock and its metropolitan area, being part of the Bible Belt. As of 2020, the largest Christian groups were Baptists, followed by the Catholic Church and Methodism. The largest Baptist denominations within the Lubbock area are the Southern Baptist Convention and Baptist General Convention of Texas. Catholics within the metropolitan area are primarily served by the Roman Catholic Diocese of Lubbock. Methodists are divided between the United Methodist Church and other smaller Methodist bodies. The Church of Jesus Christ of Latter-Day Saints dedicated a temple in the city in 2002 that serves church members living in West Texas, the Panhandle, and adjacent parts of New Mexico.

Of the religious population, 1.9% practiced Islam; the Islamic religion is the second largest in the area as of 2020. Eastern faiths including Buddhism and Hinduism were collectively the third largest groups in Lubbock, and Judaism was practiced by an estimated 0.1% of the population.

== Economy ==
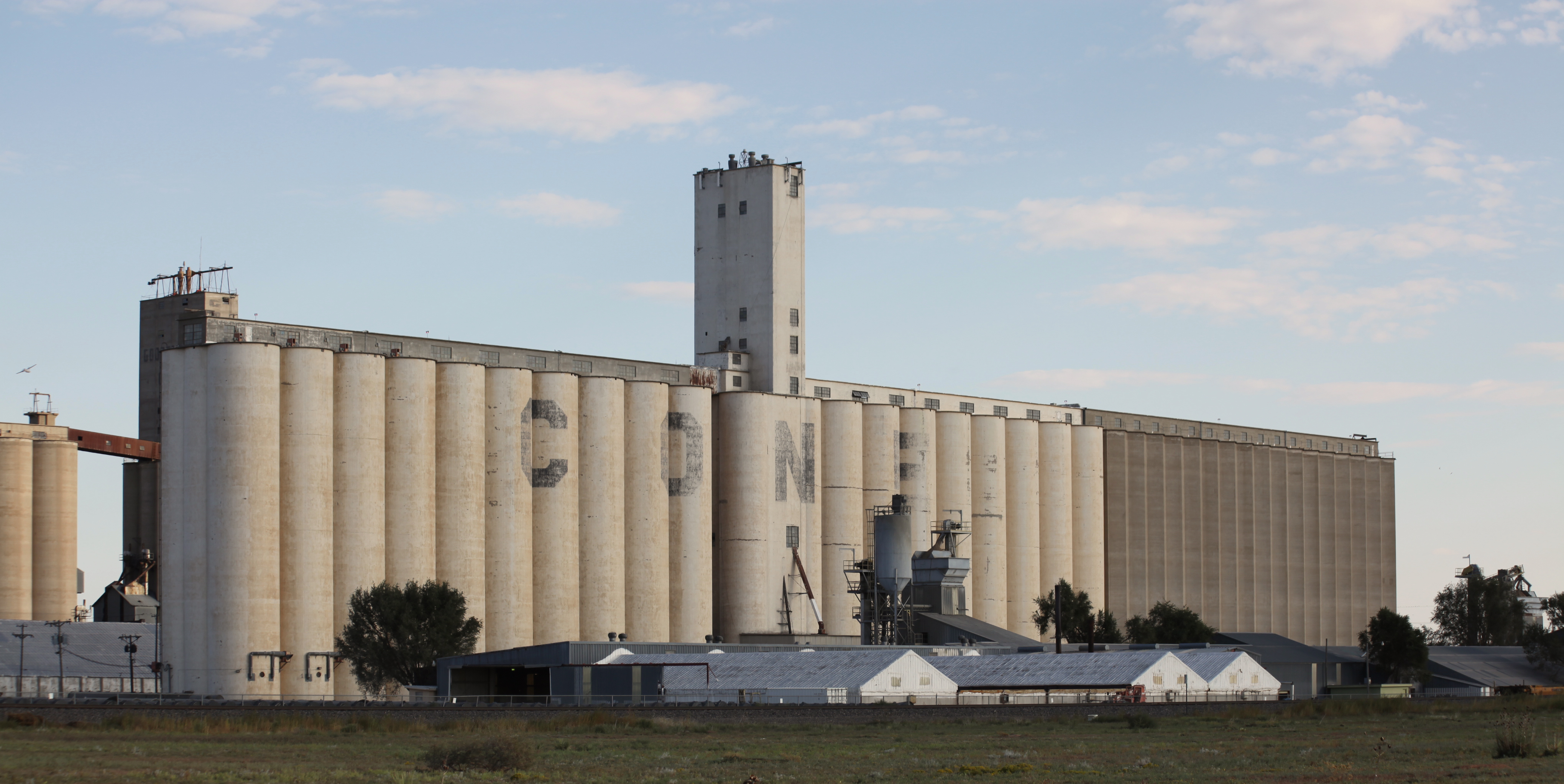
Cone grain elevator, north side of Lubbock

The Lubbock area is the largest contiguous cotton-growing region in the world and is heavily dependent on federal government agricultural subsidies and on irrigation water drawn from the Ogallala Aquifer. The aquifer is being depleted at a rate unsustainable over the long term. Some progress has been made toward water conservation, and new technologies such as low-energy precision application irrigation were originally developed in the Lubbock area. A new pipeline from Lake Alan Henry is expected to supply up to 3.2 billion US gallons (12,000,000 m^{3}; 12 GL) of water per year.

The 10 largest employers in terms of the number of employees are Texas Tech University, Covenant Health System, Lubbock Independent School District, University Medical Center, United Supermarkets, City of Lubbock, Texas Tech University Health Sciences Center, AT&T, and Lubbock County. A study conducted by a professor at the Rawls College of Business determined Texas Tech students, faculty, and staff contribute about $1.5 billion to the economy, with about $297.5 million from student shopping alone.

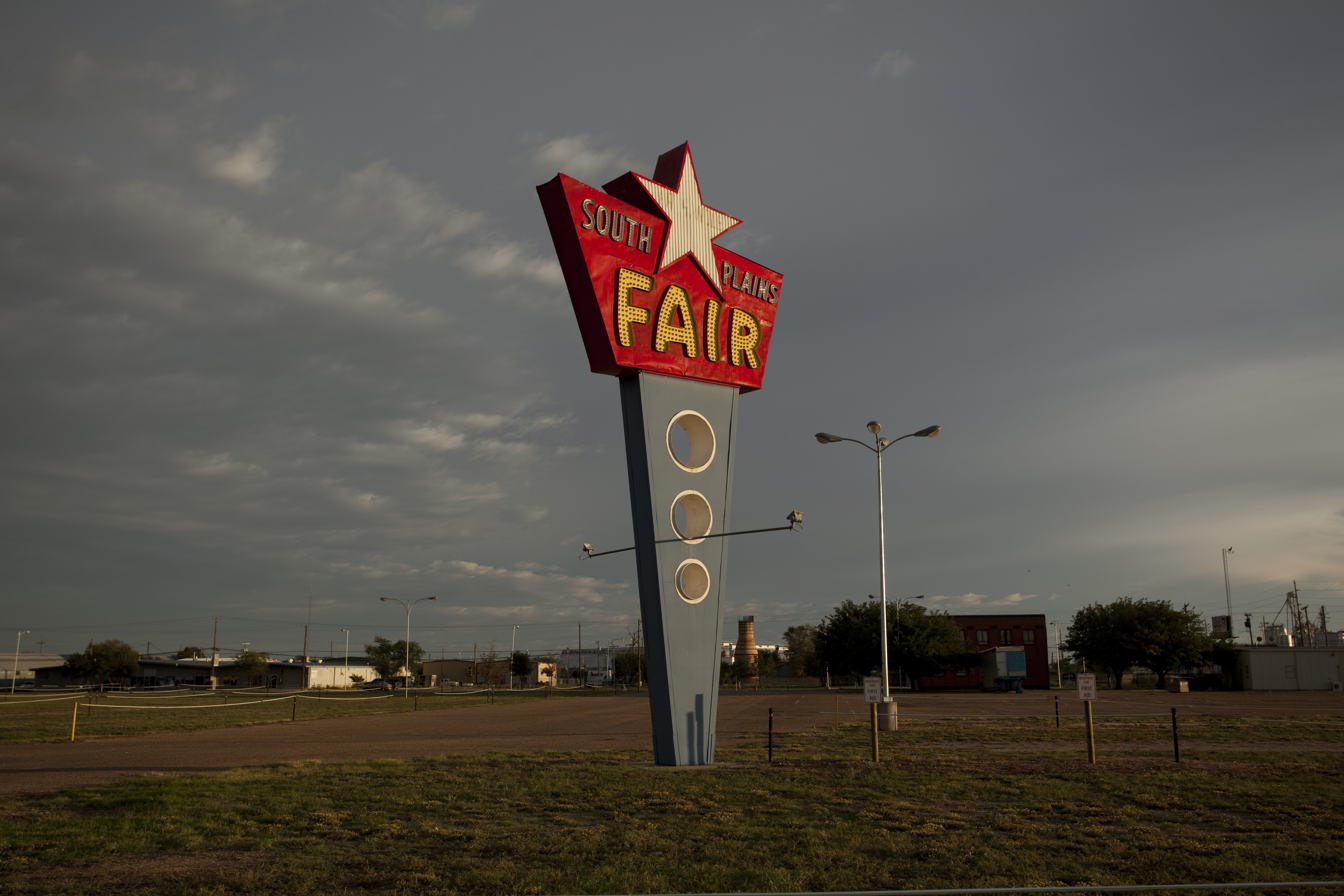
Panhandle-South Plains Fairgrounds

=== Environmental issues ===
The Scrub-A-Dubb Barrel Company, in the north of the city, had been the cause of public complaints, and committed numerous environmental violations, since the 1970s. Local KCBD News undertook several investigations into the barrel recycling company's waste-handling practices, and when the business closed in 2011, the Environmental Protection Agency was called in to begin cleaning up the site, which they described as "a threat to public health, welfare, and the environment". Greg Fife, the EPA's on-site coordinator, said: "Out of the 60,000 [barrels] we have on site, we think there are between 2,000 and 4,000 that have significant hazardous waste in them". Local residents were informed, "hazardous substances have overflowed the vats and flowed off the site into nearby Blackwater Draw and subsequently through Mackenzie recreational park. The runoff is easily accessible to children at play in the park, golfers, and the park's wildlife." Remediation of the site was expected to take at least five months, at a cost of $3.5 million in federal dollars.

== Arts and culture ==
=== Annual cultural events ===
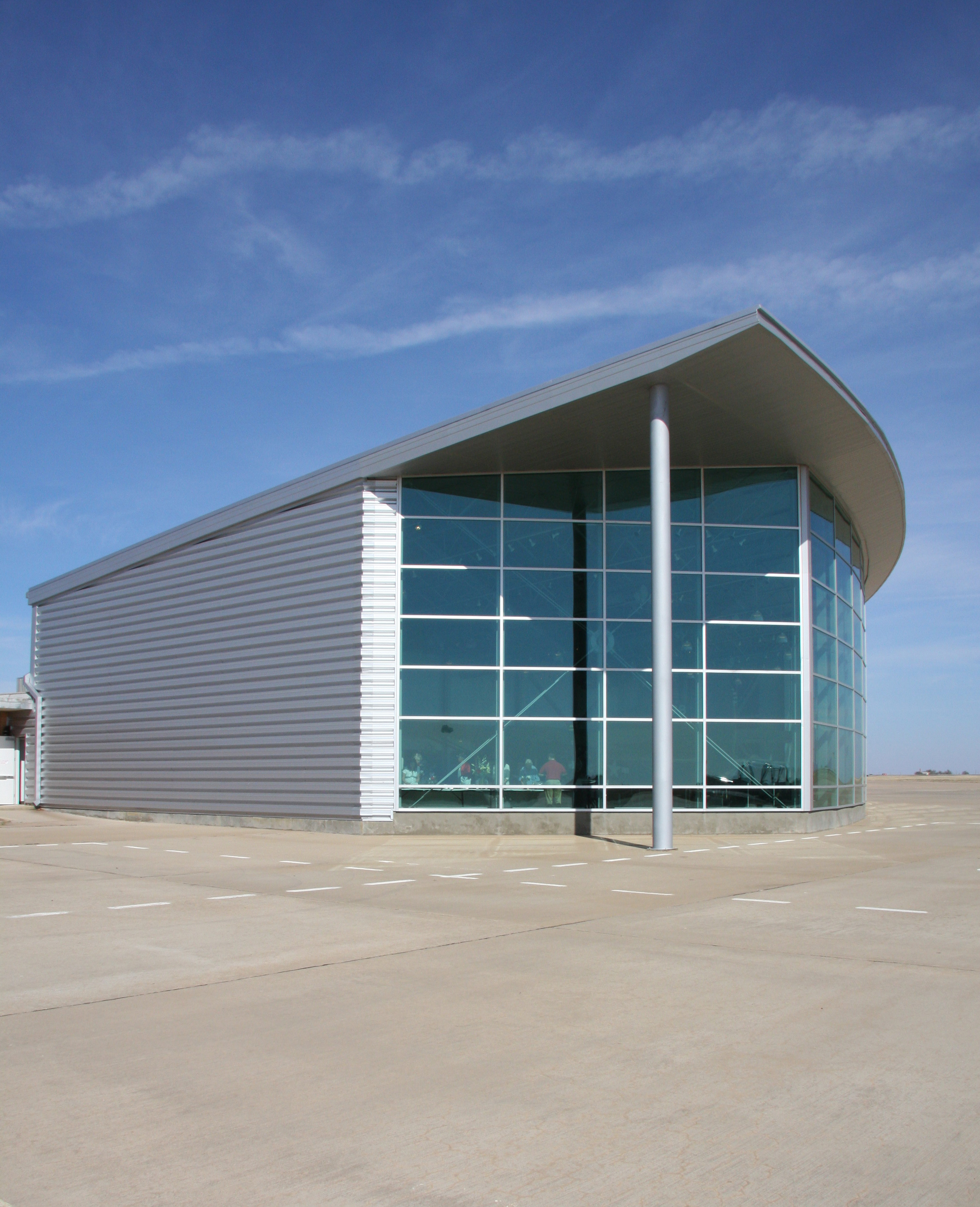
Lubbock's Silent Wings Museum at the former South Plains Army Airfield

Every year on July 4, Lubbock hosts the 4th on Broadway event, an Independence Day festival. The event is free to the public, and is considered the largest free festival in Texas. The day's activities usually include a morning parade, a street fair along Broadway Avenue with food stalls and live bands, the Early Settlers' Luncheon, and an evening concert/fireworks program. Broadway Festivals Inc., the nonprofit corporation which organizes the event, estimated a 2004 attendance over 175,000 people. Additionally, the College Baseball Foundation holds events relating to its National College Baseball Hall of Fame during the 4th on Broadway event.

The South Plains Fair is also hosted annually, and features a wide variety of entertainment, including live music, theme-park rides, and various food items sold in a carnival-like setting. During the fair, many agricultural and livestock contests also take place, bringing many participants from the surrounding cities.

The National Cowboy Symposium and Celebration, an annual event celebrating the prototypical Old West cowboy, takes place in Lubbock. The event, held in September, features art, music, cowboy poetry, stories, and the presentation of scholarly papers on cowboy culture and the history of the American West. A chuckwagon cook-off and horse parade also take place during the event.

=== Monthly cultural events ===
On the first Friday of each month, Lubbock hosts a free art walk in downtown called the First Friday Art Trail. The event, which is managed by the Louise Hopkins Underwood Center for the Arts and has been held since 2004, attracts around 20,000 people monthly. In July 2024, the Lubbock City Council voted to strip $30,000 in funding for the event after council member David Glasheen discovered the money was being used to promote drag shows and LGBTQ+ workshops, a move which attracted complaints from a small number of Lubbock residents and some members of the Lubbock arts community.

=== Music ===
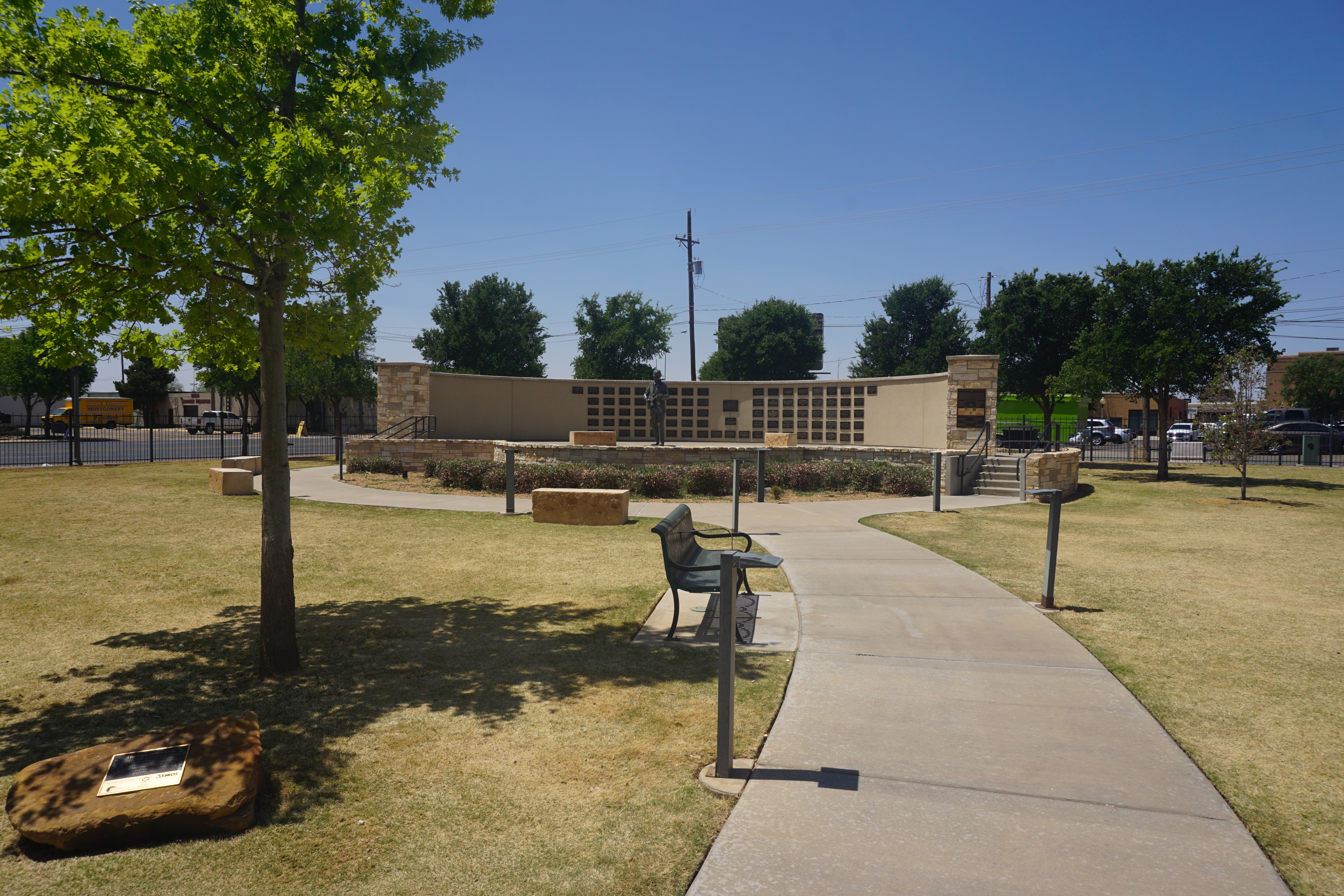
Buddy and Maria Elena Holly Plaza

The West Texas arts scene has created a "West Texas Walk of Fame" within Buddy and Maria Elena Holly Plaza in the historic Depot District, which details musicians such as Buddy Holly, who came from the local area. Lubbock continues to play host to rising and established alt-country acts at venues such as the Cactus Theater and The Blue Light Live, both on Buddy Holly Avenue. The spirit of Buddy Holly is preserved in the Buddy Holly Center in Lubbock's Depot District. The 2004 film Lubbock Lights showcased much of the music associated with the city of Lubbock.

Lubbock is the birthplace of rock and roll legend Buddy Holly, and features a cultural center named for him. The city renamed its annual Buddy Holly Music Festival the Lubbock Music Festival after Holly's widow increased usage fees for his name. Similarly, the city renamed the Buddy Holly West Texas Walk of Fame to honor area musicians as the West Texas Hall of Fame. On January 26, 2009, the City of Lubbock agreed to pay Holly's widow $20,000 for the next 20 years to maintain the name of the Buddy Holly Center. Additionally, land near the center will be named the Buddy and Maria Holly Plaza. Holly's legacy is also remembered through the work of deejays, such as Jerry "Bo" Coleman, Bud Andrews, and Virgil Johnson on radio station KDAV.

Groundbreaking was held on April 20, 2017, for the construction of a new performing arts center, the Buddy Holly Hall of Performing Arts and Sciences, a downtown $154 million project that opened in January 2021. Holly Hall will also have concession sites and a bistro with both outdoor and indoor dining. United Supermarkets has been named the food and beverage provider. Thus far, the private group, the Lubbock Entertainment and Performing Arts Association, has raised or received pledges in the amount of $93 million. The Lubbock Independent School District and Ballet Lubbock also support the project.

Lubbock is the birthplace of Mac Davis (1942–2020), who graduated at the age of 16 from Lubbock High School and became a country music singer, songwriter, and actor with crossover success. His early work writing for Elvis Presley produced the hits "Memories", "In the Ghetto", and "A Little Less Conversation". A subsequent solo career in the 1970s produced hits, such as "Baby, Don't Get Hooked on Me", making him a well-known name in popular music. He also starred in his own variety show, a Broadway musical, and various films and television programs.

Outsider musician and psychobilly pioneer The Legendary Stardust Cowboy was also born in Lubbock. He began his musical career there, playing free shows in various parking lots around town. Since striking it big, however, he has not performed in Lubbock, due to how little support and encouragement the city showed him when he was first starting out. John Denver got his start in Lubbock and as a freshman student at Texas Tech in 1966 could be found playing in the Student Union for free. His father was a colonel in the USAF stationed at Reese Air Force Base west of the city.

The Lubbock Symphony Orchestra was founded in 1946 and performs at the Lubbock Memorial Civic Center Theatre.

The Moonlight Musicals Amphitheater is a 930-seat amphitheater opened in 2006. For a period was known as the Wells Fargo Amphitheater. It is used for concerts, stage shows and other special events.

=== Tourism ===
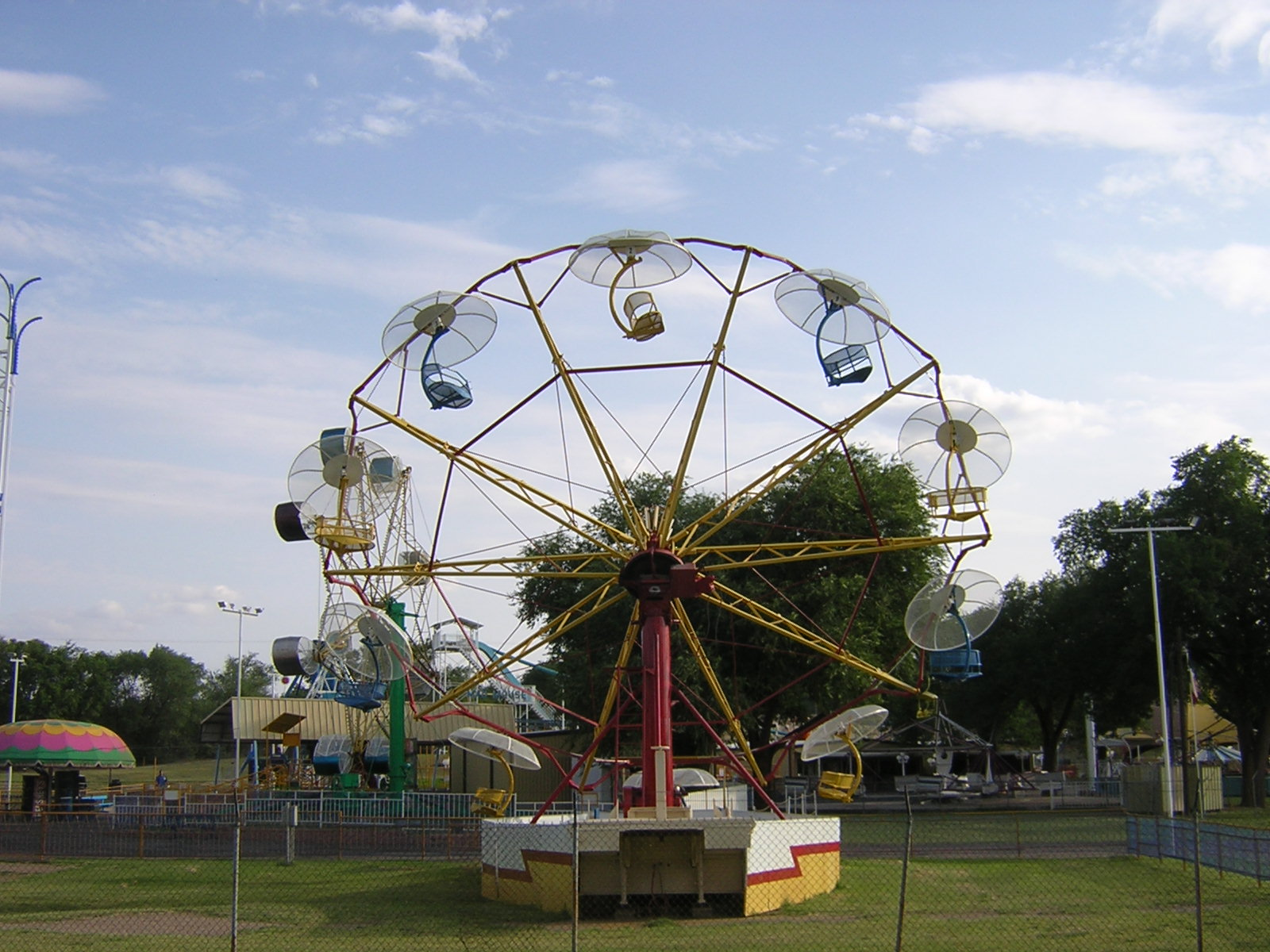
Joyland Amusement Park

Lubbock sits within the Texas High Plains, an eight-million-acre region that produces 80% of the state's wine grapes. Five wineries are based near Lubbock, providing a significant draw for wine lovers.

The National Ranching Heritage Center, a museum of ranching history, is in Lubbock. It features a number of authentic early Texas ranch buildings, as well as a railroad depot and other historic buildings. An extensive collection of weapons is also on display.

The Southwest Collection, an archive of the history of the region and its surroundings, which also works closely with the College Baseball Foundation, is on the campus of Texas Tech University, as are the Moody Planetarium and the Museum of Texas Tech University.

The Depot District, an area of the city dedicated to music and nightlife in the old railroad depot area, boasts theatres, upscale restaurants, and cultural attractions. The district is also home to several shops, pubs, nightclubs, a radio station, a magazine, a winery, a salon, and other establishments. Many of the buildings were remodeled from the original Fort Worth & Denver South Plains Railway Depot which stood on the site. The Buddy Holly Center, a museum highlighting the life and music of Buddy Holly, is also in the Depot District, as is the restored community facility, the Cactus Theater.

Lubbock is also home to the Silent Wings Museum. Located on North I-27, Silent Wings features photographs and artifacts from World War II-era glider pilots.

The Science Spectrum is an interactive museum and 58-foot, domed-screen "omni theatre" with a special focus on children and youth.

=== National Register of Historic Places ===
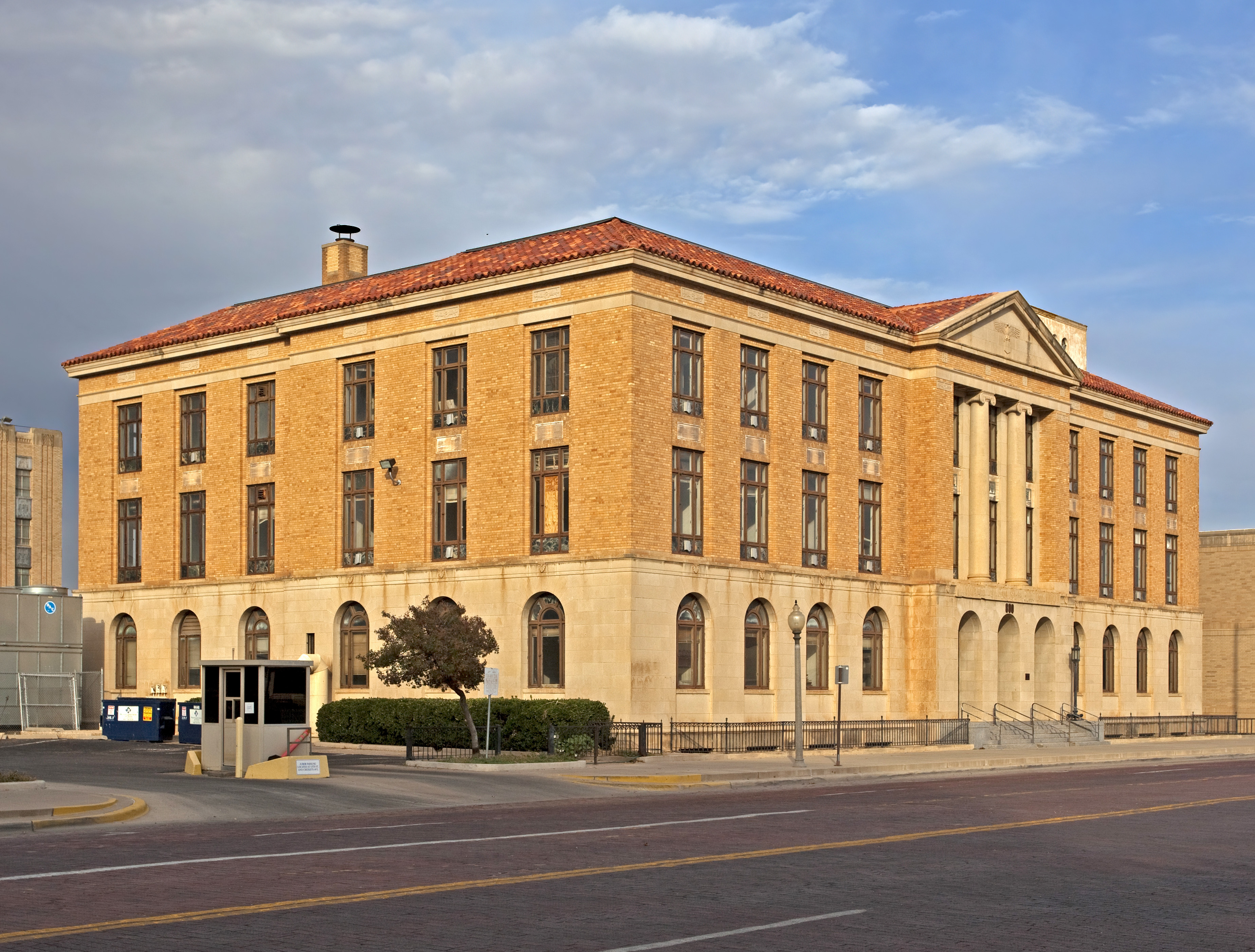
Lubbock Post Office and Federal Building, constructed in 1932.

- Cactus Theater
- Canyon Lakes Archaeological District
- Carlock Building
- Fort Worth and Denver South Plains Railway Depot
- Fred and Annie Snyder House
- Holden Properties Historic District
- Kress Building
- Lubbock High School
- Lubbock Lake Landmark
- Lubbock Post Office and Federal Building
- South Overton Residential Historic District
- Texas Technological College Dairy Barn
- Texas Technological College Historic District
- Tubbs-Carlisle House
- Warren and Myrta Bacon House
- William Curry Holden and Olive Price Holden House

== Sports ==
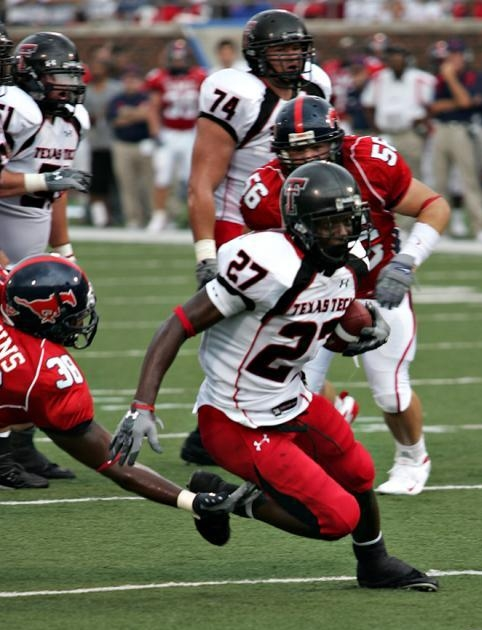
A Texas Tech Red Raiders football game

The Texas Tech Red Raiders are in the Big 12 Conference and field 17 teams in 11 different varsity sports. Men's varsity sports at Texas Tech are baseball, basketball, cross country, football, golf, tennis, and indoor and outdoor track and field. Women's varsity sports are basketball, cross country, golf, indoor and outdoor track and field, soccer, softball, tennis, and volleyball.

The football program has been competing since October 3, 1925. The Red Raiders have won 15 conference titles and been to 50 bowl games, winning five of the last seven.

The men's basketball program, started in 1925, has been to the NCAA Tournament 18 times—advancing to the Sweet 16 seven times, and the Elite Eight twice, and in 2019 they reached the Final Four and were the NCAA Tournament Runner-up under coach Chris Beard. Bob Knight, hall-of-famer and second-winningest coach in men's college basketball history, coached the team from 2001 to 2008.

Of the varsity sports, Texas Tech has had its greatest success in women's basketball. Led by Sheryl Swoopes and head coach Marsha Sharp, the Lady Raiders won the NCAA Women's Basketball Championship in 1993. The Lady Raiders have also been to the NCAA Elite Eight three times and the NCAA Sweet 16 seven times. In early 2006, Lady Raiders coach Marsha Sharp resigned and was replaced on March 30, 2006, by Kristy Curry, who had been coaching at Purdue.

Texas Tech also offers 30 club sports, including cycling, equestrianism, ice hockey, lacrosse, polo, rodeo, rugby, running, sky diving, swimming, water polo, and wrestling. In 2006, the polo team, composed of Will Tankard, Ross Haislip, Peter Blake, and Tanner Kneese, won the collegiate national championship.

In addition, Lubbock is the home of the Chaparrals of Lubbock Christian University. With a recent move up to NCAA Division 2, the women's basketball team has won the 2016 and 2019 national championships. In 2009, the Lubbock Christian University baseball team won their second NAIA National Championship.

High-school athletics also feature prominently in the local culture.

=== Professional and Semi-professional teams ===
The Lubbock Renegades, a member of the af2, a developmental league of the Arena Football League, were in operation from 2006 to 2008. The team played in the former Lubbock Memorial Coliseum.

The Lubbock Cotton Kings, of the former Central Hockey League, operated from 1999 to 2007.

In 2021, National Premier Soccer League announced the formation of the Lubbock Matadors SC in the 2022 season.

=== Little League ===
In 2007, the Lubbock Western All-Stars Little League Baseball team made it to the final four of the Little League World Series.

== Parks and recreation ==
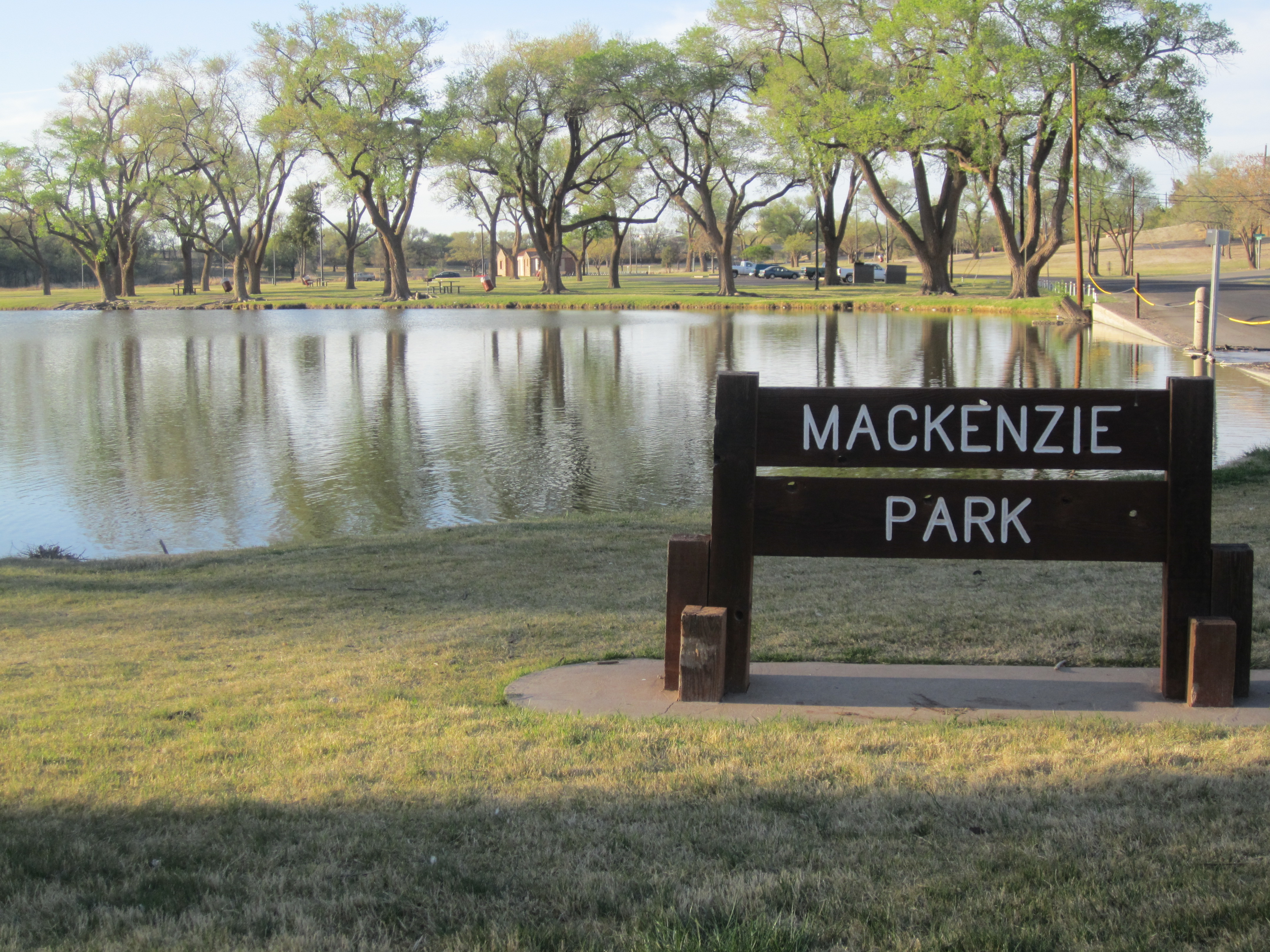
Entrance to Mackenzie Park

In March 1877, during the Buffalo Hunters' War, the Battle of Yellow House Canyon took place at what is now the site of Mackenzie Park. Today, Mackenzie Park is home to the now closed Joyland Amusement Park, Prairie Dog Town, and both a disc golf and a regular golf course. The park also holds the American Wind Power Center, which houses over 100 historic windmills on 28 acres (11 hectares). Two tributaries of the Brazos River wind through Mackenzie Park, which is collectively part of the rather extensive Lubbock Park system. These two streams, Yellow House Draw and Blackwater Draw, converge in the golf course, forming the head of Yellow House Canyon, which carries the waters of the North Fork Double Mountain Fork Brazos River.

Lubbock is home to numerous parks, scattered throughout the city. Most parks feature a small lake and attract waterfowl of various species. One of Lubbock's larger lakes, Dunbar Historic Lake, lies in Dunbar Historic Lake Park, near Mackenzie Park. Drainage exits into the North Fork Double Mountain Fork Brazos River. The park features miles of hiking trails and the Crosbyton-Southplains Railroad trestle, built in 1911, which spans the North Fork Double Mountain Fork Brazos River at the park's southeast end. This trestle has become known by many locals as "Hell's Gate" or "Hell's Gate Trestle" for its supposed paranormal activity.

Many parks in Lubbock are home to a series of Playa Lakes. Often small in size, the lakes serve as reservoirs for stormwater and irrigation runoff, and are an important part of the West Texas High Plains ecosystem. Playa lakes generally drain from one to another over land during a rainfall event, but many were connected as part of an underground drainage project in the early 2000s to avoid flooding.

== Government ==
=== Municipal government ===
City government (as of January 2021):
Mayor	Mark McBrayer (R)
District 1	Christy Martinez-Garcia (Mayor Pro Tem)
District 2	Gordon Harris
District 3	David Bruegel
District 4	Tim Green
District 5	Jennifer Wilson
District 6	Tim Collins

Lubbock has a council-manager government system, with all governmental powers resting in a legislative body called a city council. Voters elect six council members, one for each of Lubbock's six districts, and a mayor. The council members serve for a term of four years, and the mayor serves for two years. After the first meeting of the city council after newly elected council members are seated, the council elects a mayor pro tempore, who serves as mayor in absence of the elected mayor. The council also appoints a city manager to handle the ordinary business of the city. Currently, no term limits are set for either city council members or the mayor.

After a previous attempt failed in the city council, Lubbock approved by popular referendum a "sanctuary city for the unborn" ordinance, seeking to outlaw abortion within city limits. The ordinance went into effect shortly thereafter and the only abortion clinic stopped providing abortion care. Planned Parenthood sued and a federal judge upheld the ordinance.

=== Politics ===
United States presidential election results for Lubbock, Texas
Year	Republican		Democratic		Third party(ies)	
Year	No.	%	No.	%	No.	%
2016	51,033	63.26%	24,963	30.94%	4,674	5.79%
2020	60,537	61.77%	35,818	36.55%	1,645	1.68%

Lubbock is in Texas's 19th congressional district, represented by Republican Jodey Arrington. In the Texas House of Representatives, Lubbock County is covered by districts 83 and 84.

According to a study released by the nonpartisan Bay Area Center for Voting Research in 2005, Lubbock is the second-most conservative city in the United States among municipalities greater than 100,000 in population.

City of Lubbock vote by party in Class II Senate elections
Year	Democratic	Republican	Other
2020	33.5% 32,513	63.2% 61,255	3.3% 3,156
2014	22.1% 8,034	77.9% 28,298	0.00% 0

John Cornyn went from a nearly 80% win in the city in 2014 to a barely 63% win in 2020.

City of Lubbock vote by party in Class I Senate elections
Year	Democratic	Republican	Other
2018	38.6% 28,868	60.6% 45,404	0.8% 606

City of Lubbock vote by party in Gubernatorial elections
Year	Democratic	Republican	Other
2018	32.9% 24,536	64.6% 48,131	2.5% 1,862
2014	24.8% 9,335	75.2% 28,331	0.00% 0

City of Lubbock vote by party in Lieutenant Gubernatorial elections
Year	Democratic	Republican	Other
2018	37.5% 22,847	59.3% 44,016	3.2% 2,345

== Education ==
=== K-12 Schools ===
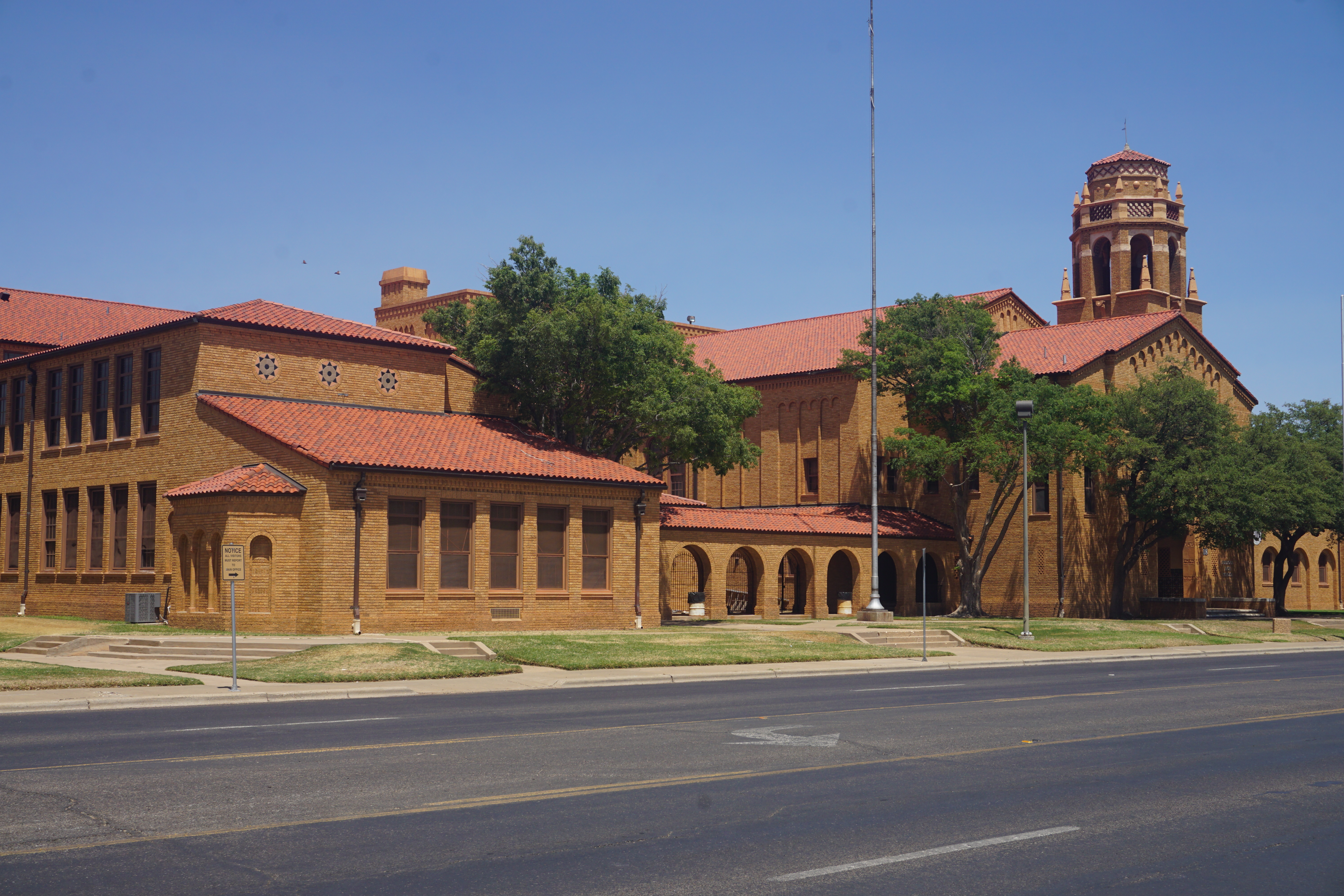
Lubbock High School

Schools in Lubbock are operated by several public school districts and independent organizations.

Public school districts with sections serving the Lubbock city limits:

- Lubbock Independent School District
- Frenship Independent School District
- Idalou Independent School District
- Lubbock-Cooper Independent School District
- New Deal Independent School District
- Roosevelt Independent School District
- Shallowater Independent School District

Private schools:

- All Saints Episcopal School
- Christ the King Cathedral School
- Trinity Christian School
- Lubbock Christian High School
- Kingdom Preparatory Academy
- Southcrest Christian School

Charter schools:

- Harmony Science Academy
- Sharp Academy

=== Higher education ===
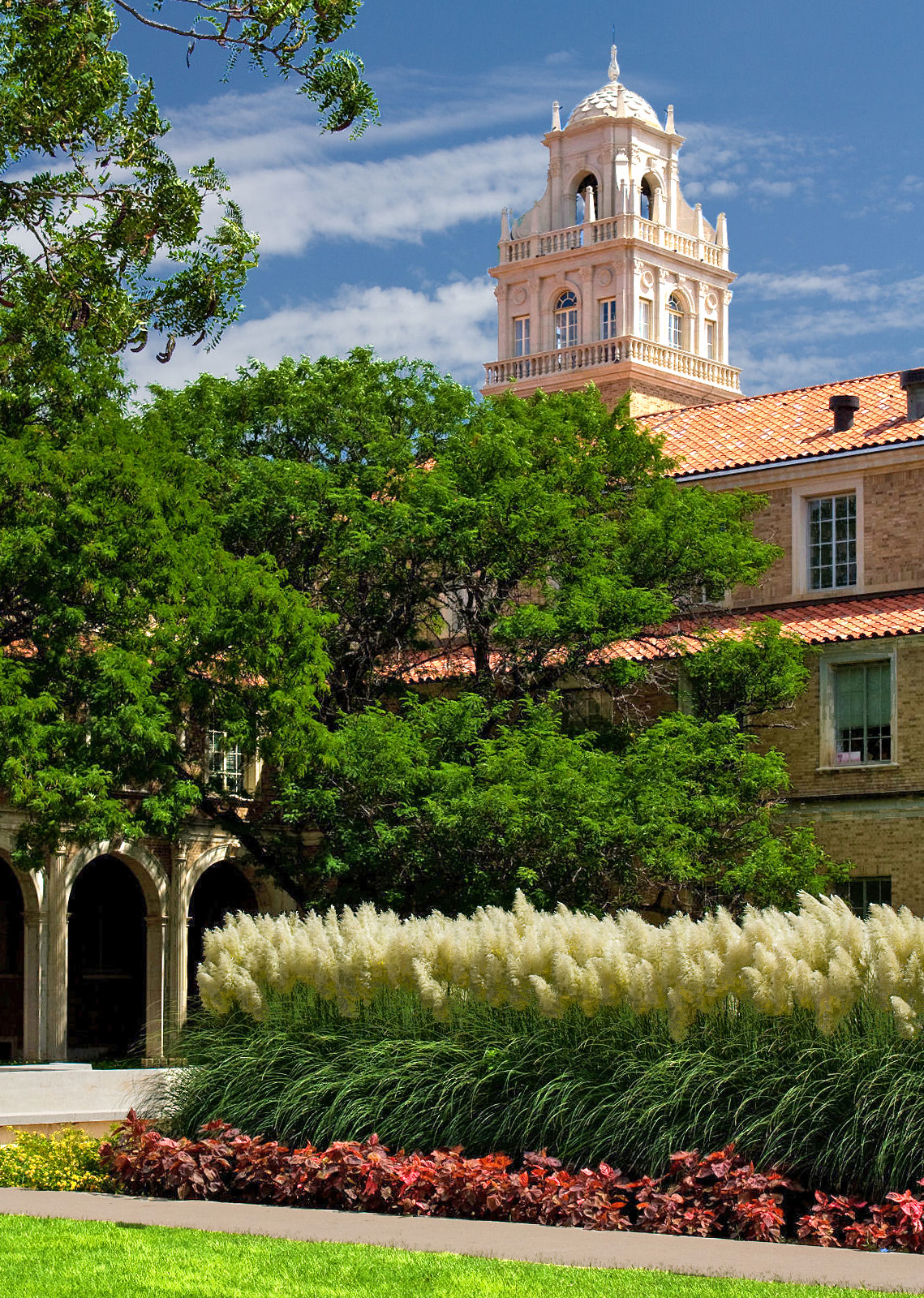
Texas Tech University

Lubbock is home to Texas Tech University, which was established on February 10, 1923, as Texas Technological College. It is the leading institution of the Texas Tech University System and has the seventh-largest enrollment in the state of Texas. It is one of two schools (the other being UT Austin) in Texas to house an undergraduate institution, law school, and medical school at the same location. Altogether, the university has educated students from all 50 US states and over 100 foreign countries. Enrollment has continued to increase in recent years, and growth is on track with a plan to have 40,000 students by 2020.

Lubbock is also home to other college campuses in the city, including Lubbock Christian University, South Plains College, Wayland Baptist University, and Sunset International Bible Institute.

Covenant Health System, a health-care provider serving West Texas and Eastern New Mexico, operates a school of nursing, school of radiography, and school of surgical technology.

== Media ==
Lubbock's main newspaper is the daily Lubbock Avalanche-Journal, which is owned by Gannett. The newspaper also publishes a full-color lifestyle magazine, Lubbock Magazine, eight times a year. Texas Tech University publishes a student-run daily newspaper called The Daily Toreador.

Local TV stations include KTTZ-TV-5 (PBS), KCBD-11 (NBC), KLBK-13 (CBS), KLCW-TV-22 (The CW, with MyNetworkTV on DT2), KAMC-28 (ABC), and KJTV-TV-34 (Fox).

Texas Tech University Press, the book- and journal-publishing office of Texas Tech University, was founded in 1971, and as of 2012, has about 400 scholarly, regional, literary, and children's titles in print.

=== Radio ===
- 88.1 KTXT-FM (College)
- 88.5 K203CB (Christian Contemporary)
- 89.1 KTTZ-FM (Public Radio)
- 89.7 KLTB (Spanish Christian)
- 90.1 KAMY-FM (Christian Contemporary)
- 90.5 KBAH (Religious)
- 90.9 KKLU (Christian Contemporary)
- 91.5 K218DI (Religious)
- 91.9 KPGA (FM)(Christian Contemporary)
- 92.3 K222CQ KLZK (Hip Hop)
- 92.7 KVCE (Religious)
- 93.1 K226CH KTTU-FM (Texas Country)
- 93.7 KLBB-FM (Classic Hits)
- 94.1 K231BE KLZK (Classic Country)
- 94.5 KFMX (Active Rock)
- 95.1 K236CP KFYO (AM) (News & Talk)
- 95.5 KAIQ (Regional Mexican)
- 95.9 K240FA KRFE (Talk)
- 96.3 KLLL (Country)
- 96.9 K245BG KTTU-FM (Classic Country)
- 97.3 KTTU-FM (Sports)
- 97.7 K249DU KTTU-FM (Oldies)
- 98.1 KKCL-FM (Classic Hits)
- 98.7 K254CI (Christian Contemporary)
- 99.1 KLCT LPFM (Religious)
- 99.5 KQBR (Country)
- 100.3 KMMX (Top-40)
- 100.7 K264AN (Sports Talk)
- 101.1 KONE-FM (Classic Rock)
- 101.7 K269HH KKLU (Christian Contemporary)
- 102.1 K271DE KAMY-FM (Christian Contemporary)
- 102.5 KZII (Top-40)
- 102.9 KVIO-FM LPFM (Religious)
- 103.5 KAMZ (Regional Mexican)
- 103.9 K280GU KKAM (Talk)
- 104.3 KHLK (Religious)
- 104.9 KBTE (Hip Hop)
- 105.3 KJDL-FM (Spanish Christian)
- 105.7 KRBL (Texas Country)
- 106.5 KXTQ-FM (Tejano)
- 106.9 KKYN (Country)
- 107.3 KSSL (Classic Country)
- 107.7 KLZK (Hot Adult Contemporary)

== Infrastructure ==
The Texas Department of Criminal Justice operates the Lubbock District Parole Office in Lubbock.

The Texas Department of Transportation operates the West Regional Support Center and Lubbock District Office in Lubbock.

The United States Postal Service operates post offices in Lubbock.

=== Transportation ===
==== Highways ====
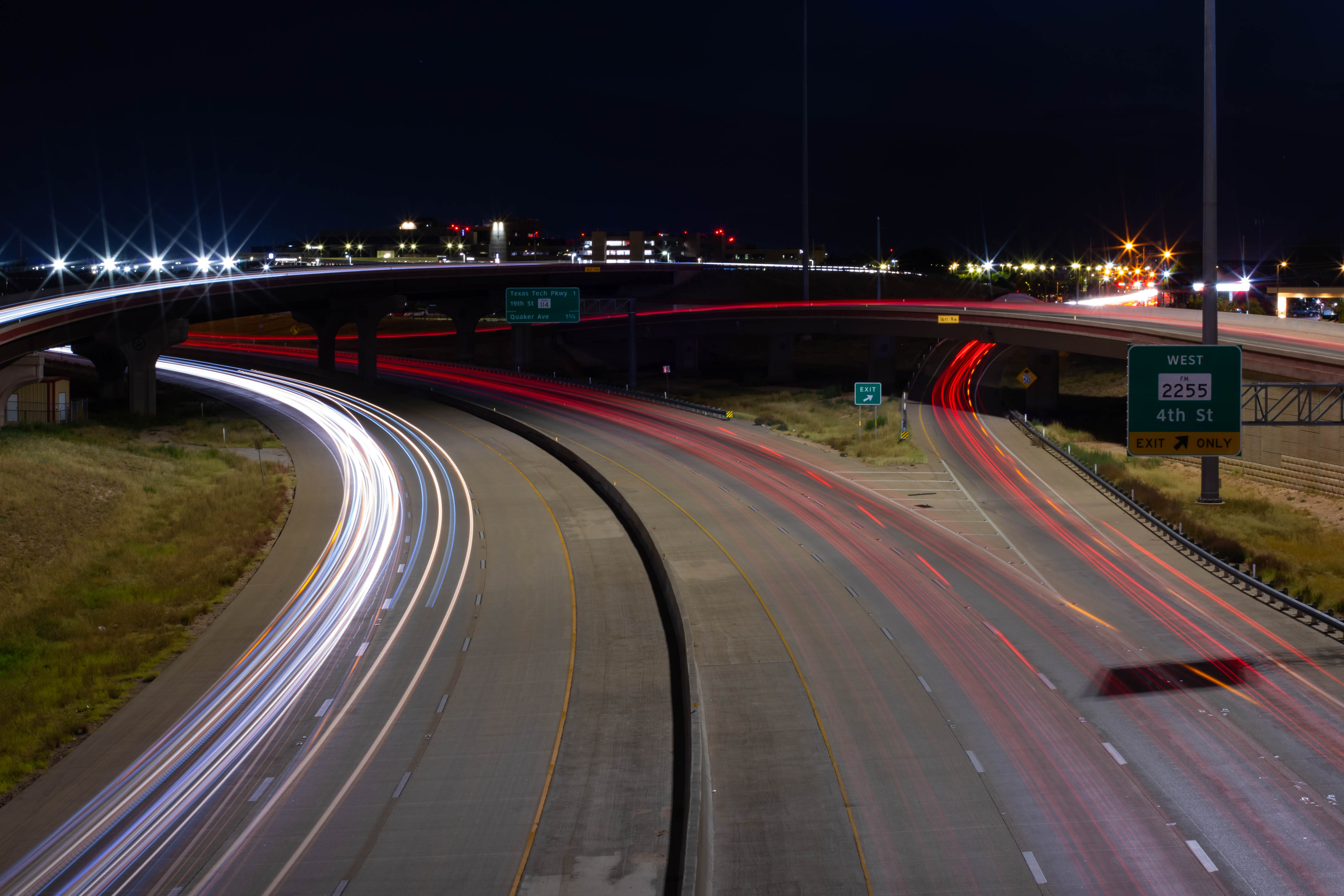
US 82, locally known as the Marsha Sharp Freeway

Lubbock is served by major highways. Interstate 27 (the former Avenue H) links the city to Amarillo and Interstate 40, a transcontinental route. I-27 was completed through the city in 1992 (it originally terminated just north of downtown). Other major highways include US 62 and US 82, which run concurrently (except for 4th Street via US 82 and 19th Street via US 62) through the city east–west as the Marsha Sharp Freeway, 19th Street (US 62 only), 4th Street/Parkway Drive (US 82 only) and Idalou Highway. US 84 (Avenue Q/Slaton Highway/Clovis Road) is also another east–west route running northwest–southeast diagonally. US Highway 87 runs between San Angelo and Amarillo and follows I-27 concurrently. State Highway 114 runs east–west, following US 62/82 on the east before going its own way. Lubbock is circled by Loop 289, which suffers from traffic congestion despite being a potential bypass around the city, which is the reason behind I-27 and Brownfield Highway being built through the city to have freeway traffic flow effectively inside the loop.

The city is set up on a simple grid plan. In the heart of the city, numbered streets run east–west and lettered avenues run north–south – the grid begins at Avenue A in the east and First Street in the north. North of First Street, city planners chose to name streets alphabetically from the south to the north after colleges and universities. The north–south avenues run from A to Y. What would be Avenue Z is actually University Avenue, since it runs along the east side of Texas Tech. Beyond that, the A-to-Z convention resumes, using US cities found east of the Mississippi River (e.g. Akron Avenue, Boston Avenue, Canton Avenue). Again, the Z name is not used, with Slide Road appearing in its place.

==== Rail service ====
Lubbock currently does not provide intercity rail service, although various proposals have been presented over the years to remedy this. One, the Caprock Chief, would have seen daily service as part of a Fort Worth, Texas—Denver, Colorado service, but it failed to gain interest. Lubbock is served by the BNSF Railway company, Plainsman Switching Company (PSC), and West Texas & Lubbock Railway (WTLC). PSC interchanges with BNSF (also with UP through a UP-BNSF Haulage agreement) in Lubbock and has 19 miles of track within city limits of Lubbock with 36 customers. Options exist for transloading a variety of materials on the line, from wind-turbine parts to steel shafts. PSC handles many commodities such as cottonseed, cottonseed oil, cottonseed meal, cottonseed hulls, milo, corn, wheat, pinto beans, sand, rock, lumber, nonperishable food items, chemicals, paper products, brick, and bagging material, and can also store cars. WTLC interchanges with BNSF (also with UP through a UP-BNSF Haulage agreement) in Lubbock. WTLC has a yard on the west side of Lubbock, where they switch cars to go down their line to Levelland or to Brownfield. WTLC handles commodities of grains, chemicals, sands, peanuts, lumber, etc.

==== Airports ====
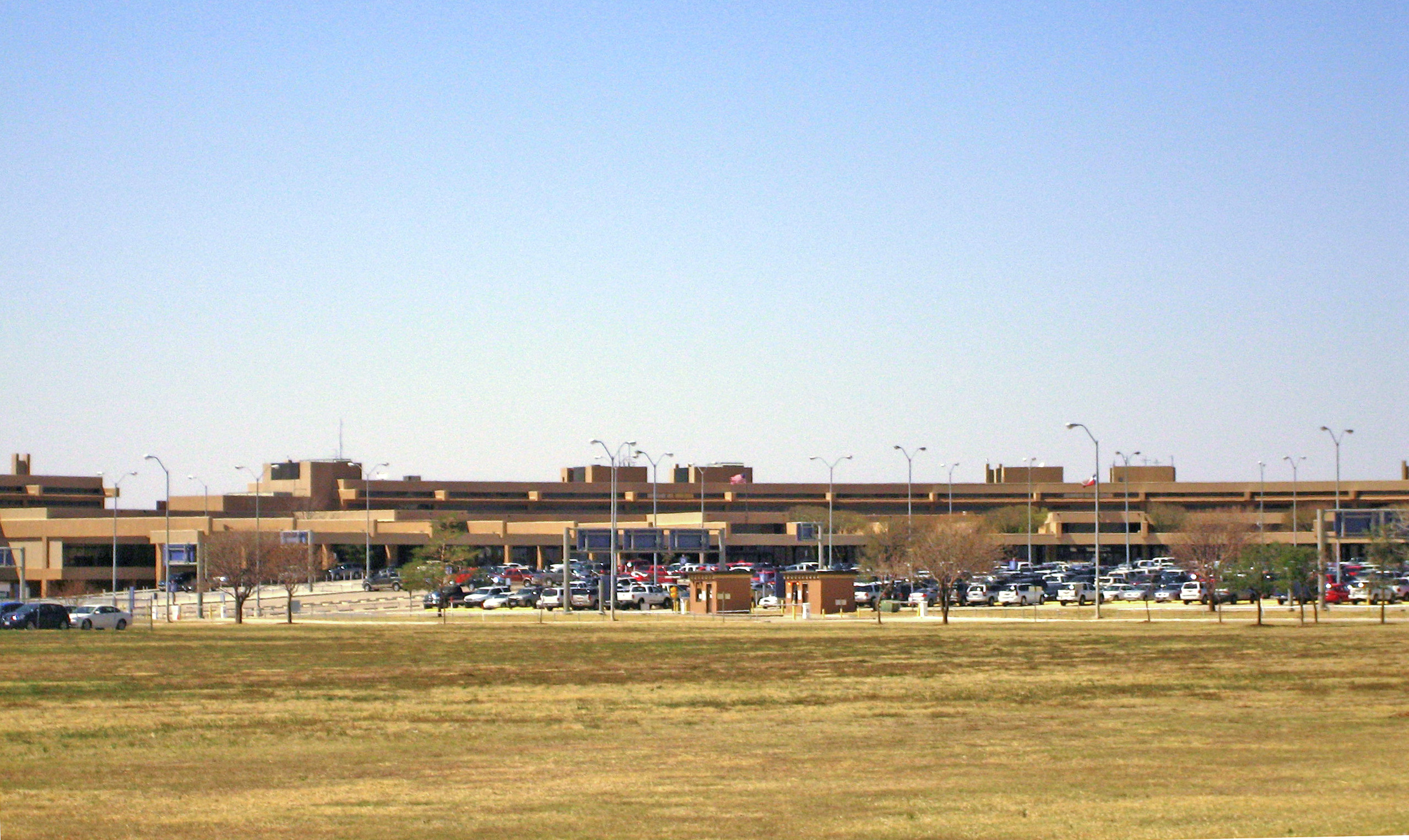
Lubbock Preston Smith International Airport

The city's air services are provided by Lubbock Preston Smith International Airport, which is named for the Lubbock businessman who became lieutenant governor and governor of Texas. It is on the city's northeast side. The airport is the eighth-busiest airport in Texas. Lubbock Preston Smith Airport also plays host as a major hub to FedEx's feeder planes that serve cities around Lubbock.

==== Intercity bus service ====
Greyhound Lines operates the Lubbock Station at 801 Broadway, just east of the Lubbock County Courthouse.

==== Public transportation ====
Public transportation is provided by Citibus, a bus transit system running Monday through Saturday every week with a transit center hub in downtown. It runs bus routes throughout the city, with the main routes converging at the Downtown Transfer Plaza, which also houses the Greyhound bus terminal. Citibus has been in continual service since 1971, when the city of Lubbock took over public transit operations. The paratransit system is called Citiaccess.

Citibus' six diesel-electric hybrid buses have begun service on city routes. Managers hope the buses will use 60% of the fuel their older, larger versions consume in moving customers across the city. The buses seat 23 passengers, can support full-sized wheelchairs, and will run on all but two city-based routes.

==== Modal characteristics ====
According to the 2016 American Community Survey, 80.9% of working Lubbock (city) residents commuted by driving alone, 12.9% carpooled, 1% used public transportation, and 1.5% walked. About 1.5% used all other forms of transportation, including taxi, bicycle, and motorcycle. About 2.3% worked at home.

In 2015, 7.3% of Lubbock households were without a car, which decreased to 5.6% in 2016. The national average was 8.7% in 2016. Lubbock averaged 1.74 cars per household in 2016, compared to a national average of 1.8 per household.

==== Milwaukee Avenue ====
In the early years of the 21st century, Lubbock turned its Milwaukee Avenue into a major thoroughfare. Previously, Milwaukee was a 4-mile dirt road on farm land with hardly any traffic a mile or more from major development. With growth headed westward, the city allocated nearly $20 million to convert the road into a seven-lane concrete thoroughfare. In 2004, the city funded the project and other developments to come by establishing a new fund that tapped part of the franchise fees received. As of 2018, more than $124 million in street construction has been possible from the fund, including Slide Road, 98th Street, Indiana Avenue, and the last phases of the Marsha Sharp Freeway. Public Works Director Wood Franklin said Milwaukee Avenue was conceived on the "build it and they will come" theory. Marc McDougal, then the mayor of Lubbock, described the project as a well calculated risk that subsequently greatly benefited the city.

=== Lubbock Power and Light ===
The majority of Lubbock is served by Lubbock Power and Light, founded in 1916. After over 100 years of service, LP&L has decided to join the Electric Reliability Council of Texas and open the Lubbock market to competitive electricity providers. Their recent anticipated approval by the Federal Energy Regulatory Commission (FERC) has been approved as of September 28, 2023. LP&L is on track to be the first municipally owned utility to enter the competitive market in ERCOT on March 4, 2024.

== Notable people ==
=== Arts and science ===
- Chace Crawford, actor, notable for roles in The Covenant, Gossip Girl and The Boys
- Dan Flores, a writer and historian who specializes in cultural and environmental studies of the American West who began his academic career at Texas Tech University
- Bryan A. Garner, lawyer, lexicographer, and teacher.
- J. Michael Bailey, psychologist and professor at Northwestern University, was born in Lubbock
- Jill Goodacre, model and actress
- Rick Husband, Astronaut and graduate from Texas Tech University
- Joshua Meyer, artist
- Gabor B. Racz, professor of anesthesiology at Texas Tech University Health Science Center, is the inventor of the Racz catheter
- Joseph Skibell (born October 18, 1959), American novelist and essayist and his brother, actor Steven Skybell
- Wayne Tippit (1932–2009), American television and stage character actor
- Erik Valdez, actor
- Helen Wagner (1918–2010), television actress (As the World Turns)
- Spencer Wells, a geneticist, grew up in Lubbock and graduated from Lubbock High School
- Kevin Williamson, National Review roving correspondent, grew up in Lubbock and once worked for the Lubbock Avalanche-Journal
- Micah Wright,

=== Military ===
- James Honea, 16th Master Chief Petty Officer of the Navy

=== Music ===
- Josh Abbott, singer of Texas country band Josh Abbott Band
- Terry Allen, Texas country and outlaw country singer-songwriter, painter and conceptual artist
- Jerry Allison, rock and roll drummer and original member of The Crickets
- Ponty Bone, singer, accordion player
- Wade Bowen, Texas Country/Red Dirt singer
- Mac Davis, country music singer, songwriter, and actor
- Travis Garland of the band NLT
- Jimmie Dale Gilmore, Butch Hancock, and Joe Ely (collectively known as The Flatlanders)
- Pat Green, Texas country music artist
- Buddy Holly, musician and singer-songwriter who was a central and pioneering figure of mid-1950s rock and roll
- Bobby Keys, saxophonist
- Logan Lynn, singer, musician, writer, composer, singer, producer
- Lloyd Maines of The Maines Brothers Band
- Natalie Maines, singer of the band The Chicks
- Joe B. Mauldin, rock and roll bassist and original member of The Crickets
- Delbert McClinton American blues rock and electric blues singer-songwriter, guitarist, harmonica player, and pianist
- Richie McDonald, lead singer of Lonestar until 2007
- Kevin Morby, indie folk singer-songwriter
- Cory Morrow, Texas country singer-songwriter
- Daron Norwood, American 90's country singer, signed to Giant
- Norman Carl Odam (aka The Legendary Stardust Cowboy)
- Pete Orta of the Christian rock group Petra
- Amanda Shires, singer-songwriter and fiddle player
- Niki Sullivan, rock and roll guitarist and original member of The Crickets
- Josh Wilson, a contemporary Christian musician.
- Flatland Cavalry, a country and Americana band.

=== Politics ===
- Jodey Arrington, Republican politician who represents Texas's 19th congressional district in the U.S. House of Representatives
- William H. Bledsoe, State Senator who in 1923 pushed for the legislation and the first $1 million appropriation which brought Texas Tech University to Lubbock
- William John Cox (Billy Jack Cox), political activist
- Robert L. Duncan, an American politician and the fourth chancellor of the Texas Tech University System
- John Frullo, is a Republican politician who represented District 84 in the Texas House of Representatives
- Delwin Jones late American politician, who, prior to 2011, was the oldest member of the Texas House of Representatives, having represented what became, and what remains District 83 based in the area surrounding Lubbock
- Mickey Leland, late Texas U.S. Representative
- John T. Montford, former member of the Texas State Senate from District 28, based about Lubbock. He is also a former district attorney for Lubbock County and a former chancellor of the Texas Tech University Systems
- James C. Nance, co-founder of Plains Journal, Oklahoma community newspaper chain publisher and Speaker of the Oklahoma House of Representatives, President pro tempore of the Oklahoma Senate and member Uniform Law Commission
- Charles Perry, member of the Texas State Senate from West Texas District 28 which contains the two cities of Lubbock and San Angelo
- Preston Earnest Smith, a long-time resident of Lubbock, was the 40th Governor of Texas from 1969 to 1973 and earlier served as the lieutenant governor from 1963 to 1969
- Claire Valdez, American Politician and member of the New York State Assembly representing the 37th District since 2025

=== Sports ===
- Ruben Castillo, boxer
- Madisyn Cox, competitive swimmer
- Mason Crosby, former National Football League (NFL) placekicker
- Jarrett Culver, shooting guard for the Memphis Grizzlies
- Craig Ehlo, basketball player
- Preston Kilwien, soccer player
- Anthony Lynn, American football head coach of the Los Angeles Chargers who played at Texas Tech University
- Greg Minton, former Major League Baseball pitcher
- Donnie Moore, baseball player
- Terry Norris, boxer
- Orlin Norris, boxer
- Mark Payne, professional basketball player
- Ron Reeves, former American football quarterback
- Micheal Ray Richardson, basketball player and coach
- Daniel Santiago, former professional basketball player
- W. E. Shattuc, who raced in the Indianapolis 500 in 1925, 1926, and 1927
- Ryan Tannehill, quarterback for the Miami Dolphins and later, the Tennessee Titans
- Bubba Shobert, National Motorcycle Champion
- Trae Young, point guard for the Atlanta Hawks
- Shea Salinas, soccer player for the San Jose Earthquakes

== Sister cities ==
=== Current sister cities ===
- City of Musashino, Tokyo, Japan – relationship established 1983

== See also ==
- Rosenthal Field
