= Texas's 84th House of Representatives district =

American legislative district

Texas's 84th State House of Representatives district
Representative
Carl Tepper; R–Lubbock

District 84 is a district in the Texas House of Representatives. It has been represented by Republican Carl Tepper since 2023.

== Geography ==
The district contains the majority of Lubbock County, Texas.

== Members ==
- Carl Isett (until 2010)
- John Frullo (2010–2023)
- Carl Tepper (since 2023)
