= Rosenthal Field =

Ballpark in Lubbock, Texas, US

- Interactive map of Rosenthal Field
- Full name: Rosenthal Field
- Former names: Hubber Park
- Location: Lubbock, Texas
- Coordinates: 33.6007°N 101.8661°W
- Owner: Mrs. Sam Rosenthal

Construction
- Opened: 1922
- Renovated: 1948
- Closed: 1956

Tenants
- Lubbock Hubbers (West Texas League) (1922) (Panhandle-Pecos Valley League) (1923) (West Texas League) (1928) (West Texas–New Mexico League) (1938–1942 & 1946–1955) (Big State League) (1956)

Rosenthal Field was a ballpark in Lubbock, Texas. It opened in 1948 as Hubber Park but the wife of Sam Rosenthal, who dedicated himself to building up the Lubbock Hubbers into a championship team, changed the name almost immediately to Rosenthal Field. By mid 1954 it was called Odam field.
