= Carl Tepper =

American politician

Member of the Texas House of Representatives from the 84th district
- Incumbent
- Assumed office January 10, 2023
- Preceded by: John Frullo

Personal details
- Party: Republican
- Education: Texas Tech University (BA)
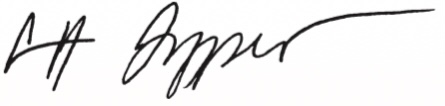
- Signature

Carl H. Tepper is an American politician. A Republican, he represents District 84 in the Texas House of Representatives.
