= Moonlight Musicals Amphitheater =

930-seat amphitheater

Coordinates: 33.5864°N 101.8313°W

- Interactive map of Moonlight Musicals Amphitheater
- Former names: Wells Fargo Amphitheater
- Address: 413 E. Broadway, Lubbock, TX, 79403
- Location: Mackenzie Park
- Seating type: Grass terrace
- Capacity: 930
- Type: Open Air Amphitheater

Construction
- Groundbreaking: 2003
- Built: 2003-2006
- Opened: August 2006
- Cost: $2.7 million by 2006 (adjusted from $1.7 million in 1999)

Tenant
- Moonlight Musicals

The Moonlight Musicals Amphitheater is a 930-seat amphitheater located in Lubbock, Texas. Construction began in 2003 and was opened in 2006. For a period was known as the Wells Fargo Amphitheater. It is used for concerts, stage shows and other special events.

== History ==
In April 2002, the then President of Wells Fargo Bank, Gary Lawrence, gave $500,000 to contribute to the renovation and creation of a first class open air amphitheater in Lubbock's Mackenzie Park. In 1999 Lubbock voters had already approved $1.7 million for the construction of an Amphitheater at Mackenzie Park, but after construction adjustments requirements had reason to $2.7 million. The donation left a requirement for another $500,000 to ensure complete funding.

In June of 2003 a further $150,000 was donated by Dallas based oil company Alon-Fina. Construction of the venue began in 2003 with the remaining money required to complete the project coming from other private donations while work was already under way.

== Opening ==
The amphitheater was opened in August of 2006 with an eight performance run of the Rodgers and Hammerstein musical Oklahoma! put on by what was then known as Lubbock Moonlight Musicals. Since then the amphitheater has hosted almost 40 further productions put on by the now re-branded Moonlight Musicals group.
