= Caprock Chief =

Proposed rail route in the US

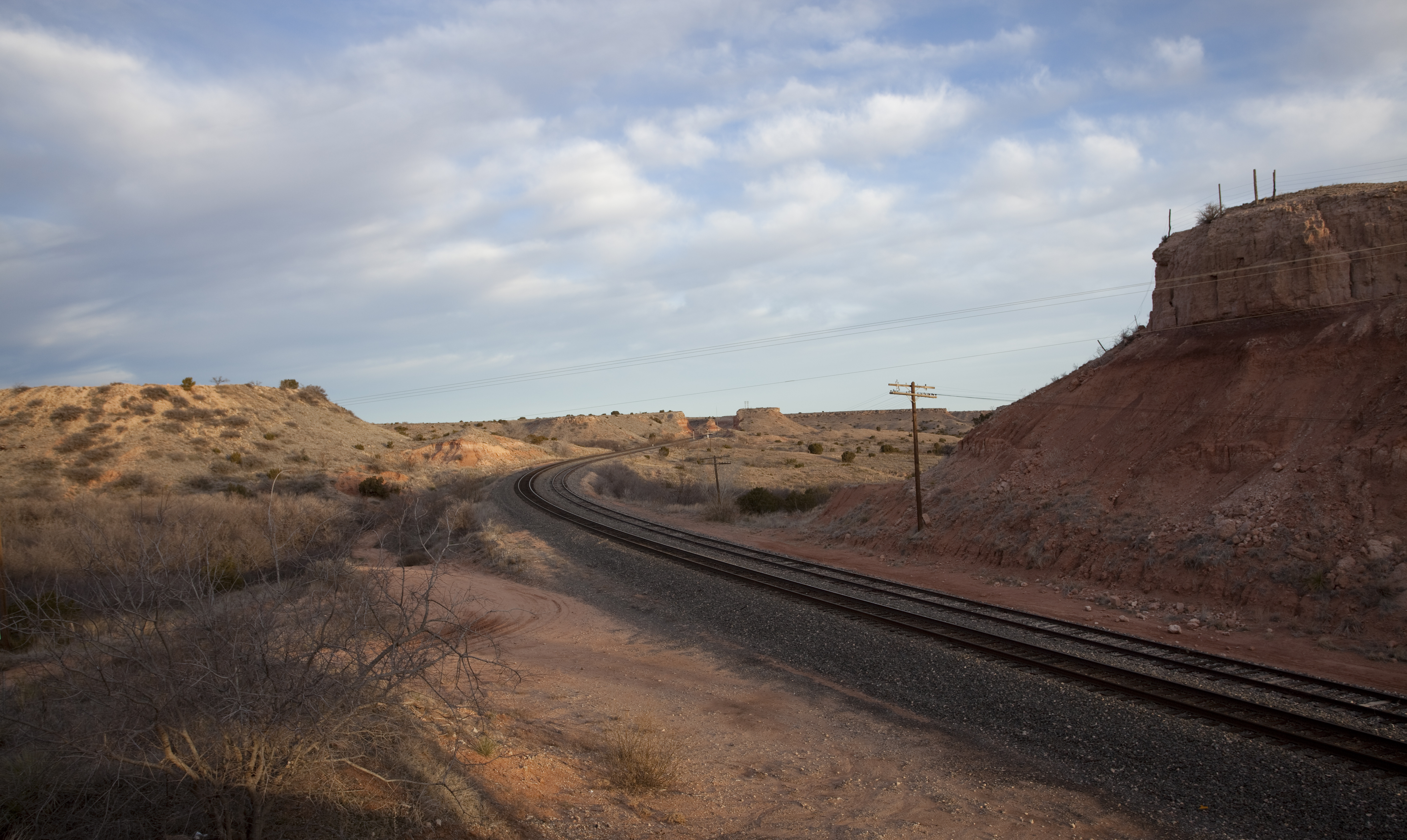
The proposed route of the Caprock Chief would follow the existing BNSF Railway, shown here as it climbs the Caprock Escarpment of the Llano Estacado between Southland and Post, Texas.

The Caprock Chief or Caprock Xpress was a proposed Amtrak inter-city rail service which would run from Fort Worth, Texas, to Denver, Colorado, passing through the Texas Panhandle, which currently does not have passenger rail service of any kind. Initially proposed 2000–2001, the project has not yet seen significant progress and is unlikely to be implemented. "Caprock" is a geological term for a harder or more resistant rock type overlying a weaker or less resistant rock type, and lends its name to the Caprock Escarpment that defines the edge of the high plains of the Llano Estacado.

== Route ==
The train would run west from Fort Worth across northern Texas, then turn north to run through the Texas Panhandle and the western edge of Oklahoma before entering Colorado. It would serve the following communities:

- Texas: Fort Worth, Weatherford, Eastland, Abilene, Sweetwater, Lubbock, Plainview, Amarillo
- Oklahoma: Boise City
- Colorado: La Junta, Pueblo, Colorado Springs, Littleton, and Denver

Both Fort Worth and Denver are served by long-distance trains (the Texas Eagle and California Zephyr, respectively), but there has not been single-train service between the two cities since the Texas Zephyr ended in 1967. As of 2010, any such trip would require changing trains in Illinois or California, a detour of over a thousand miles.

Fort Worth is also served by the Heartland Flyer, which connects it to Oklahoma City, Oklahoma, while La Junta is a stop on the transcontinental Southwest Chief. None of the other proposed station stops have train service. In the past there have been proposals to re-route the existing Sunset Limited (Los Angeles—Orlando) farther north to serve the Fort Worth—Sweetwater segment.

== Development ==
The impetus for the route came from the Texas Association of Rail Passengers (TARP), which lobbied local governments to support the concept. In late 2001 a visit by Amtrak officials to Lubbock produced discussion, but no commitment from the corporation.

In early 2002 the Amarillo City Commission voted unanimously in favor of "a resolution supporting proposed Amtrak rail service expansion to provide a direct route through the Panhandle of Texas from Fort Worth, Texas to Denver, Colorado via the Caprock Chief line." The Lubbock chamber of commerce also voiced its support for the route, with 92% of its members in favor. Commenting on the proposal, representative Mac Thornberry warned that "Having Amtrak service through the Panhandle would be a good thing for our region...but it won't be easy. Our nation's rail infrastructure faces some serious challenges, and Amtrak is already heavily subsidized by the taxpayers. Any new routes will have to improve Amtrak's financial situation, rather than make it worse."

By 2004 the president of the TARP acknowledged that the proposal was dead: "It's probably years off before this can be considered...We figure you've got to start talking about it at some point. It has to be an idea and you have to develop that idea." The proposal reemerged in 2013–2014, when Amtrak contemplated re-routing the Southwest Chief via Amarillo. TARP officials expected that the change could make Amarillo a hub for train services. The Caprock Chief, with termini in Denver and Fort Worth, would allow passengers to transfer at Amarillo to increase ridership of the Southwest Chief.

== See also ==
- Ports-to-Plains Corridor
- Atchison, Topeka and Santa Fe Railway
