= Metro Tower (Lubbock) =

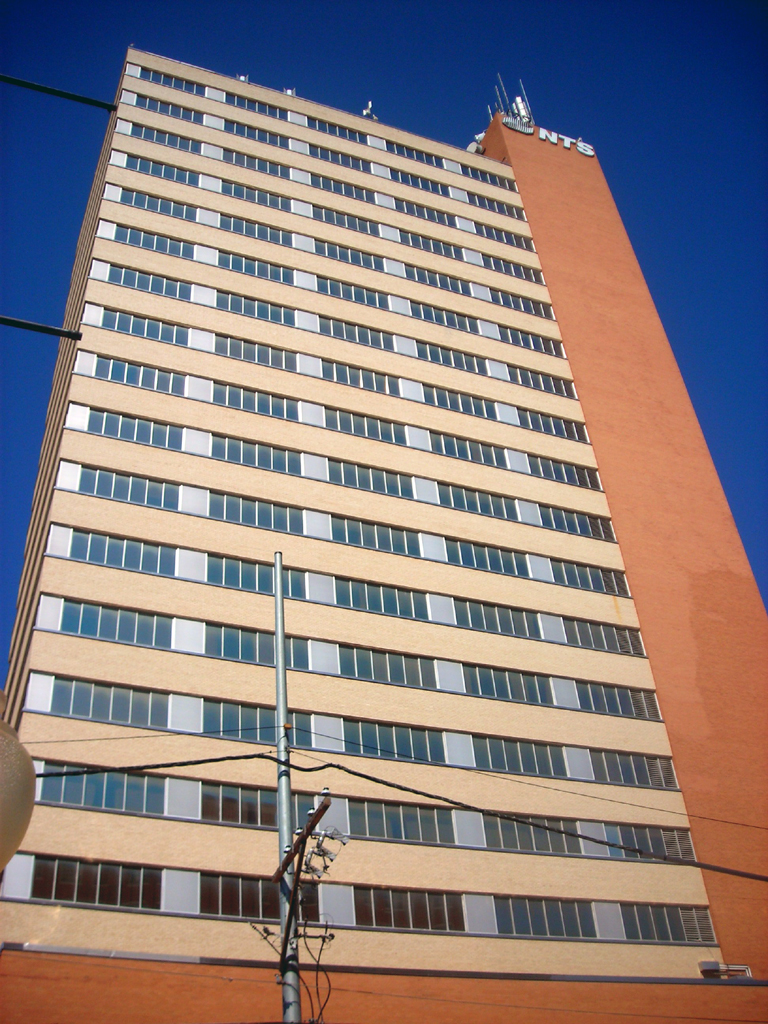
- Metro Tower survived a direct hit from a tornado
- Interactive map of the Metro Tower area
- Former names: Great Plains Life Building
- Alternative names: NTS Tower; NTS Communications Building

Record height
- Tallest in Lubbock since 1955^{[I]}
- Preceded by: Bank of America Tower

General information
- Status: Completed
- Type: Commercial offices
- Location: 1220 Broadway Street; Lubbock, Texas
- Coordinates: 33.584794°N 101.848836°W
- Construction started: 1954
- Completed: 1955
- Owner: NTS Communications

Height
- Roof: 274 ft (84 m)

Technical details
- Floor count: 20
- Floor area: 111,000 sq ft (10,310 m^{2})
- Lifts/elevators: 4 (originally installed by Westinghouse; Modernized in 2014 by OTIS

The Metro Tower, also known as the NTS Tower, is an office high-rise building located in Lubbock, Texas. Completed in 1955, it is the tallest building in Lubbock at 274 feet (84 meters). The 20-story building was originally known as the Great Plains Life Building after an insurance company that was its first occupant. It suffered heavy damage in the 1970 Lubbock tornado, and sat vacant and derelict for several years amid talk of possible demolition. After extensive renovation, the building was reopened in 1975 and has been occupied ever since.The damage is still visible, with a darkened paint color on the orange section of the building. It is the second-tallest-known building to have survived a direct hit by an F5 tornado. The tallest is the ALICO building in Waco, which is two stories taller. However, after the tornado, the Lubbock fire department closed some floors due to the worsening condition of the building.

In mid-2019, it was stated that MRE Capital would renovate the building. The renovation would include facelift and full restoration of the building. It would also add 89 residential units. The company would provide US$20 million budget for the revitalization. The building renovation was expected to start in late 2019, and be finished by the end of 2021.

The building was listed on the National Register of Historic Places in 2021.

Records
Preceded by Bank of America Tower	Tallest Building in Lubbock; 1955—Present; 84 m	Succeeded by None
