= Lubbock Post Office and Federal Building =

- U.S. National Register of Historic Places
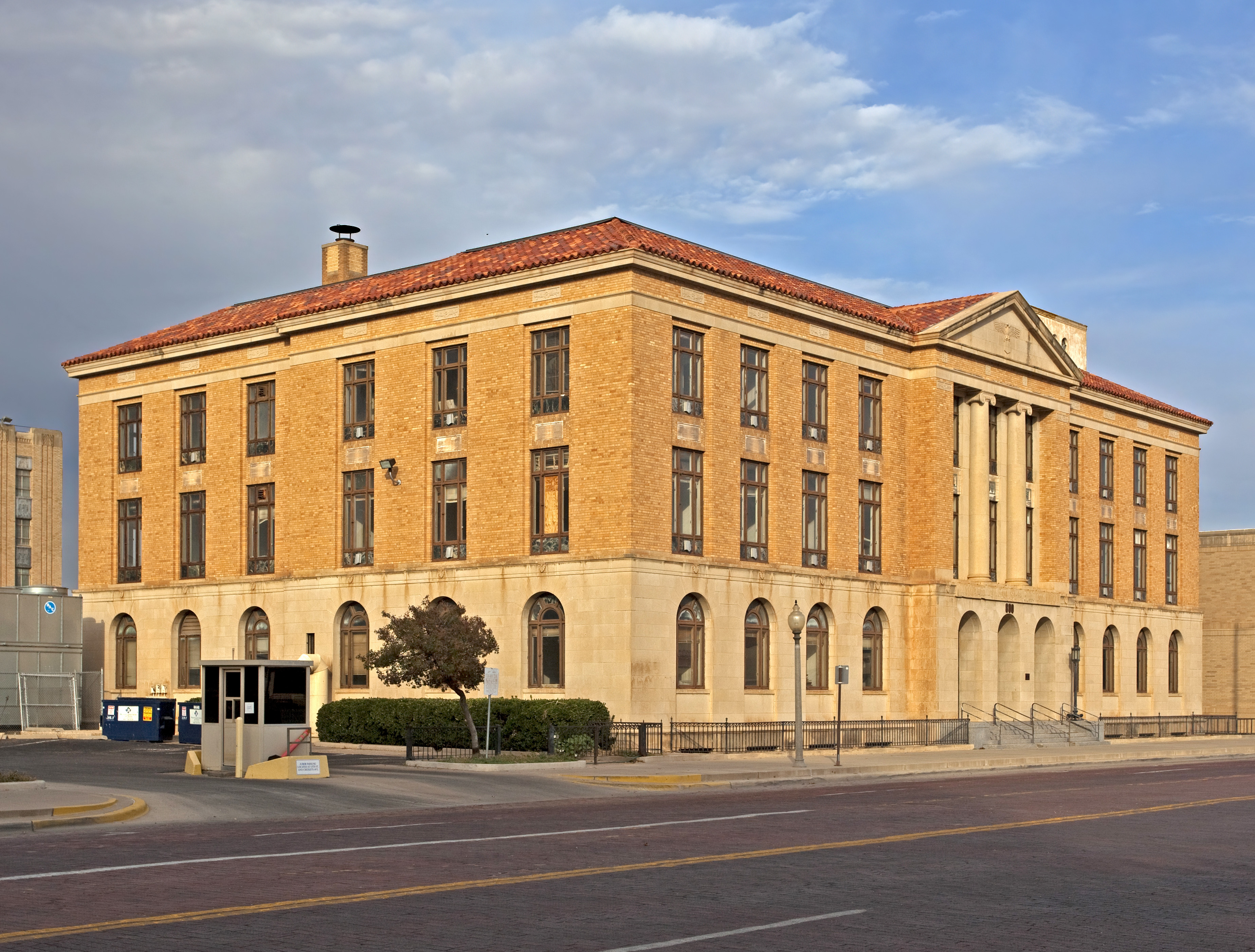
- Lubbock Post Office and Federal Building in 2012

- Location within Texas Location within the United States
- Location: 800 Broadway, Lubbock, Texas
- Coordinates: 33°35′6″N 101°50′35″W
- Area: less than one acre
- Built: 1931
- Built by: William McDonald Construction Co.
- Architect: James A. Wetmore
- Architectural style: Classical Revival
- NRHP reference No.: 95000101
- Added to NRHP: February 17, 1995

The Lubbock Post Office and Federal Building, located at 800 Broadway in downtown Lubbock, Texas, was a post office and federal courthouse from 1932 to 1968.

== History ==
Federal funds were obtained through the Public Buildings Act of 1926 to construct a new federal courthouse in Lubbock, Texas. Construction began in 1931 and the building was completed in 1932 at a cost of $4.7 million. The United States District Court for the Northern District of Texas met here until 1968, after which time it was used by Lubbock County for offices and storage. A lack of proper building maintenance led to its abandonment in 1998.

The building was nominated and listed on the National Register of Historic Places in 1995. In 2011, Preservation Texas, a nonprofit preservation group, listed it as one of the most endangered historic sites in Texas.

In 2013, Lubbock's Commissioners Court put the building up for sale and Appaloosa Development of Lubbock offered $500,000 but then backed out of the deal. More recently John Thompson (Austin) and Jeff Sagansky (New York) of Elm Tree Partners and John Snyder (Oklahoma) have offered $425,000 for the 28,000 sq ft (2,600 m^{2}) building. The offer was accepted by Lubbock County Commissioners and plans are to convert the building to apartment or hotel rooms, dining, or office space.

== Architectural description ==
The 3-story building was designed in the late Classical Revival style, which can be seen in its symmetrical plan and its ornamentation. While the first floor has a limestone exterior, the second and third floors have a buff brick exterior designed to resemble an Italian Renaissance palazzo.

== See also ==
- National Register of Historic Places listings in Lubbock County, Texas
- List of United States federal courthouses in Texas
