= 105.3 FM =

FM radio frequency

The following radio stations broadcast on FM frequency 105.3 MHz:

== Argentina ==
- América in Paraná, Entre Ríos
- Blue in La Plata, Buenos Aires
- Del Buen Ayre in Bella Vista, Buenos Aires
- El Signo in Rosario, Santa Fe
- Espacio in Huangelén, Buenos Aires
- Estación del siglo in Rio Grande, Tierra del Fuego
- La 100 Santa Rosa in Santa Rosa, La Pampa
- La 105 in Villa María, Córdoba
- Q in Alta Gracia, Córdoba.
- Radar in Humboldt, Santa Fe.
- Región in Gálvez. Santa Fe
- Master in Miramar, Buenos Aires
- Metropolis in Formosa

== Australia ==
- 4BBB in Brisbane, Queensland
- 2NEW in Newcastle, New South Wales
- ABC Radio National in Mansfield, Victoria
- Triple J in Swan Hill, Victoria
- Vision Radio Network in Portland, Victoria

== Brazil ==
- ZYD 574 in Novo Hamburgo, Rio Grande do Sul

== Canada (Channel 287) ==
- CBU-FM-4 in Kamloops, British Columbia
- CBVP-FM in Perce, Quebec
- CBWW-FM in Dauphin/Baldy Mountain, Manitoba
- CKKW-FM in Kitchener, Ontario
- CFXY-FM in Fredericton, New Brunswick
- CHCT-FM in Sainte-Marie, Quebec
- CHOW-FM in Amos, Quebec
- CHRD-FM in Drummondville, Quebec
- CHRM-FM in Matane, Quebec
- CISS-FM in Ottawa, Ontario
- CIXM-FM in Whitecourt, Alberta
- CJMX-FM in Sudbury, Ontario
- CJMY-FM in Clarenville, Newfoundland and Labrador
- CKMH-FM in Medicine Hat, Alberta
- CKTG-FM in Thunder Bay, Ontario
- VF2449 in Island Lake, Saskatchewan
- VF2455 in Muskeg River Mine, Alberta
- VF2550 in Pemberton, British Columbia

== Cayman Islands ==
- ZFKA-FM at Cayman Brac
- ZFKZ-FM at Georgetown

== China ==
- CNR Music Radio in Baoding

== Egypt ==
- Nagham FM in multiple locations

== Greece ==
- Siera FM in West Macedonia, Greece

== Guatemala (Channel 44) ==
- TGRN-FM in Flores.

== Indonesia ==
- RRI Programa 4 in Malang

== Israel ==
- Kan Tarbut in Jerusalem and the Judea and Samaria Area

== Malaysia ==
- Kool FM in Johor Bahru, Johor
- Ai FM in Miri, Sarawak
- Johor FM in Northern Johor
- Suria in Klang Valley
- TraXX FM in Kuantan, Pahang and Taiping, Perak

== Mexico ==
- XHBQ-FM in Guaymas, Sonora
- XHCMR-FM in Cuautla, Morelos
- XHE-FM in Durango, Durango
- XHEMAX-FM in Tecomán, Colima
- XHINFO-FM in Mexico City
- XHLUPE-FM in Monterrey, Nuevo León
- XHOU-FM in Huajuapan de León, Oaxaca
- XHPPU-FM in Puerto Peñasco, Sonora
- XHRU-FM in Chihuahua, Chihuahua
- XHUZ-FM in Aguascalientes, Aguascalientes
- XHZTP-FM in Zacatlán, Puebla

== Philippines ==
- Radyo Natin in Infanta, Quezon
- DWMK in Pinamalayan, Oriental Mindoro
- DWTC in Guimba, Nueva Ecija
- DZCT in Tayabas, Quezon
- DYSL in Hinoba-an, Negros Occidental
- DXSI in Mati City
- DXRZ-FM in Santo Tomas, Davao del Norte
- DXXB in Buug, Zamboanga Sibugay
- DXWS in Malaybalay, Bukidnon

== United States (Channel 287) ==
- KAKJ in Marianna, Arkansas
- KBFP in Delano, California
- KBGX in Keaau, Hawaii
- KCJZ in Cambria, California
- KCMS in Edmonds, Washington
- KDDQ in Comanche, Oklahoma
- KDWY in Diamondville, Wyoming
- KFBZ in Haysville, Kansas
- KGDM-LP in Merced, California
- KGRD in Orchard, Nebraska
- KHJJ-LP in Albany, Oregon
- KICI-LP in Iowa City, Iowa
- KIHC-FM in Chariton, Iowa
- KINB in Kingfisher, Oklahoma
- KIOD in McCook, Nebraska
- KIOZ in San Diego, California
- KITS in San Francisco, California
- KIWA-FM in Sheldon, Iowa
- KJDL in Levelland, Texas
- KJMM in Bixby, Oklahoma
- KJRZ-LP in Libby, Montana
- KKNI-FM in Sterling, Alaska
- KLFJ in Hoxie, Arkansas
- KLIP in Monroe, Louisiana
- KLNC in Lincoln, Nebraska
- KLSR-FM in Memphis, Texas
- KLTW in Winnie, Texas
- KLYV in Dubuque, Iowa
- KMOQ in Columbus, Kansas
- KMTX in Helena, Montana
- KNCB-FM in Vivian, Louisiana
- KNOD in Harlan, Iowa
- KONA in Kennewick, Washington
- KQOL (FM) in Sleepy Hollow, Wyoming
- KQOR in Mena, Arkansas
- KRBD in Ketchikan, Alaska
- KRDG in Shingletown, California
- KRLD-FM in Dallas, Texas
- KSLO-FM in Simmesport, Louisiana
- KSMG in Seguin, Texas
- KSWZ-LP in St. George, Kansas
- KTCY in Menard, Texas
- KTDC-LP in Muscatine, Iowa
- KTWL in Hempstead, Texas
- KXRC in Durango, Colorado
- KYBA in Stewartville, Minnesota
- KYMO-FM in East Prairie, Missouri
- KZKS in Rifle, Colorado
- KZLZ in Casas Adobes, Arizona
- KZNN in Rolla, Missouri
- KZPR in Minot, North Dakota
- KZTI in Fallon Station, Nevada
- KZZX in Alamogordo, New Mexico
- WACR in Columbus Afb, Mississippi
- WAOX in Staunton, Illinois
- WBRW in Blacksburg, Virginia
- WDAS in Philadelphia, Pennsylvania
- WECB in Headland, Alabama
- WEQF-FM in Dillwyn, Virginia
- WFIV in Loudon, Tennessee
- WFPC-LP in Rindge, New Hampshire
- WFRB in Frostburg, Maryland
- WGHJ in Fair Bluff, North Carolina
- WGKR in Grand Gorge, New York
- WHTS in Coopersville, Michigan
- WJEN in Killington, Vermont
- WJLT in Evansville, Indiana
- WJYC-LP in Terryville, Connecticut
- WKAY in Knoxville, Illinois
- WKHM in Brooklyn, Michigan
- WKOA in Lafayette, Indiana
- WKPQ in Hornell, New York
- WLUP in Cambridge, Minnesota
- WLVE in Mukwonago, Wisconsin
- WMPI in Scottsburg, Indiana
- WNOH in Windsor, Virginia
- WOOC-LP in Troy, New York
- WOSF in Gaffney, South Carolina
- WOUX in St. Mary's, West Virginia
- WOWC in Morrison, Tennessee
- WPHF-LP in Menomonie, Wisconsin
- WPTQ in Glasgow, Kentucky
- WPTY in Calverton-Roanoke, New York
- WQCN-LP in Richmond, Virginia
- WQID-LP in Hattiesburg, Mississippi
- WRDG in Bowdon, Georgia
- WRHQ in Richmond Hill, Georgia
- WRJH-LP in Greeneville, Tennessee
- WRLN in Red Lake, Minnesota
- WRLO in Antigo, Wisconsin
- WSGC in Tignall, Georgia
- WSHK in Kittery, Maine
- WSTI in Quitman, Georgia
- WTJK in Humboldt, Tennessee
- WVBH-LP in Benton Harbor, Michigan
- WVEX-LP in Midland, Michigan
- WVJZ in Charlotte Amalie, Virgin Islands
- WVRO-LP in Vero Beach, Florida
- WWL in Kenner, Louisiana
- WXKZ in Prestonsburg, Kentucky
- WYCY in Hawley, Pennsylvania
- WYHT in Mansfield, Ohio
- WYKB in Fernandina Beach, Florida
- WYKS in Gainesville, Florida
- WZSP in Nocatee, Florida
