= KEDB =

KEDB may refer to:

- KEDB, a former callsign of KIHC-FM
- KEDB, a TV station in California
- Known error database (KEDB)
