= KJDL =

KJDL may refer to:

- KJDL-FM, a radio station (105.3 FM) licensed to Levelland, Texas, United States
- KWBF (AM), a radio station (1420 AM) licensed to Lubbock, Texas, which held the call sign KJDL from 2005 to 2019
