= KGDM =

KGDM may refer to:

- Gardner Municipal Airport (Massachusetts) (ICAO code KGDM)
- KGDM-LP, a low-power radio station (105.5 FM) licensed to Merced, California, United States
