= WVBH =

WVBH may refer to:

- WVBH (FM), a radio station (88.3 FM) licensed to Beach Haven West, New Jersey, United States
- WVBH-LP, a low-power radio station (105.3 FM) licensed to Benton Harbor, Michigan, United States
