= KELR =

KELR may refer to:

- KELR-LP, a low-power radio station (104.7 FM) licensed to serve Stockton, California, United States
- KIHC-FM, a radio station (105.3 FM) licensed to serve Chariton, Iowa, United States, which held the call sign KELR-FM from 1986 to 2009
