= KWBF =

KWBF may refer to:

- KWBF (AM), a radio station (1420 AM) licensed to serve Lubbock, Texas, United States
- KDXE (FM), a radio station (101.1 FM) licensed to serve Cammack Village, Arkansas, United States, which held the call sign KWBF-FM from 2005 to 2009
- KARZ-TV, a television station (channel 42) licensed to serve Little Rock, Arkansas, which formerly held the KWBF callsign.
