= KIHC =

KIHC may refer to:

- KIHC (AM), a radio station (890 AM) licensed to serve Arroyo Grande, California, United States
- KIHC-FM, a radio station (105.3 FM) licensed to serve Chariton, Iowa, United States
- Judiciary of Kiribati#High Court
