= XHE-FM =

Radio Fórmula station in Durango, Durango, Mexico

- Durango, Durango; Mexico
- Frequency: 105.3 FM
- Branding: Radio Fórmula

Programming
- Format: News/talk

Ownership
- Owner: Grupo Fórmula; (Transmisora Regional Radio Fórmula, S.A. de C.V.)

History
- First air date: June 27, 1934
- Former call signs: XEE-AM
- Former frequencies: 1010 kHz / 1280 kHz / 590 kHz

Technical information
- Licensing authority: CRT
- Class: B1
- ERP: 10,000 watts
- HAAT: 50.8 m (167 ft)
- Transmitter coordinates: 23°59′57″N 104°34′45.7″W

Links
- Webcast: Listen live
- Website: radioformula.com.mx

XHE-FM is a radio station on 105.3 FM that serves the state of Durango, Mexico, with Radio Fórmula programming.

== History ==
XEE was the oldest radio station in Durango. It received its concession on November 24, 1933, but did not come to air until June 27, 1934. XEE broadcast from the residence of its first owner, Alejandro O. Stevenson, with 50 watts on 1010 kHz. The station's opening featured Lázaro Cárdenas, then running for president, as well as Governor Carlos Real and the local military commander, Anacleto López. By the 1940s, XEE had expanded its programming and was operating on a new frequency, 1280; in 1943, Stevenson had transferred the station to José G. Valenzuela. In 1961, Alicia Stevenson Torrijos bought XEE, moving it to 590 and increasing its daytime power to 1,000 watts.

In the 80s it was known as "Radio Cancionero", in the 90s it joined ACIR and was known as "Radio Festival", and it was one of the first stations in COMBO with ACIR's "MIX FM" format. . It was later sold and is known as "La XE" belonging to Grupo Garza Limón.

In 1993, XEE was sold to Radio XEE, S.A. de C.V., which in 1994 converted the station into a combo by receiving authorization to build XHE-FM 105.3. Radio Fórmula acquired XEE-XHE in 2000.
