= XHOU-FM =

Radio station in Huajuapan de León, Oaxaca

- Huajuapan de León, Oaxaca; Mexico
- Frequency: 105.3 FM
- Branding: La Mejor

Programming
- Format: Grupera
- Affiliations: MVS Radio

Ownership
- Owner: Radiodifusora XEOU, S.A. de C.V.

History
- First air date: August 3, 1969

Technical information
- ERP: 25 kW
- Transmitter coordinates: 17°48′25″N 97°47′10″W

Links
- Webcast: lamejor.com.mx/huajuapan

XHOU-FM is a radio station on 105.3 FM in Huajuapan de León, Oaxaca. It carries the La Mejor grupera format from MVS Radio.

== History ==
XEOU-AM 1480 received its concession on July 1, 1969, and signed on August 3 of that year. It was owned by Manuel Humberto Siordia Mata and broadcast as a daytimer with 500 watts. In 1993, it was transferred to Radiodifusora XEOU, which remains in the Siordia Mata family.

XEOU moved to 1020 in the 1990s, increasing power to 5 kW and broadcasting at night for the first time, and to 105.3 FM in 2010.
