= List of Cultural Properties of the Philippines in Tayabas =

This page shows the list of heritage structures in Tayabas, Quezon.

Cultural Property wmph identifier (Note: wmph is an internal identifier used by Wikimedia Philippines to identify the monument. This is not an official identifier, and only shown temporarily in the templates until the government creates an updated complete list.)	Site name	Description	Province	City or municipality	Address	Coordinates	Image
	Municipio de Ciudad de Tayabas	City Hall of Tayabas	Quezon	Tayabas, Quezon	J.P. Rizal Street	14°01′31″N 121°35′33″E	Upload file
	1914 Rizal Monument	Inaugurated on June 19, 1914	Quezon	Tayabas, Quezon	J.P. Rizal Street	14°01′31″N 121°35′34″E	Upload file
	Rural Bank of Tayabas, Inc.	Established in 1963	Quezon	Tayabas, Quezon		14°01′27″N 121°35′37″E	Upload file
	Royola Ancestral House	Royola Ancestral House	Quezon	Tayabas, Quezon	JP. Rizal cor. Luis Palad St.	14°01′26″N 121°35′38″E	Upload file
	Abrigo Ancestral House	Built around the 1960s	Quezon	Tayabas, Quezon	#44 J.P. Rizal St.	14°01′42″N 121°35′40″E	Upload file
	Unfinished Sumilang Ancestral House	Supposed to be the house of the Sumilang Family, unfinished	Quezon	Tayabas, Quezon	Luis Palad St., beside the Tayaba public market	14°01′28″N 121°35′41″E	Upload file
	Gob-Rodriguez Ancestral House	Gob-Rodriguez Ancestral House	Quezon	Tayabas, Quezon	#18 Quezon Avenue	14°01′31″N 121°35′41″E	Upload file
	Florencio Lubiano Ancestral House	Florencio Lubiano Ancestral House, possibly built in 1900s	Quezon	Tayabas, Quezon	#45 Luis Palad St.	14°01′31″N 121°35′41″E	Upload file
	Rauquillo Ancestral House	Rauquillo Ancestral House, possibly built in 1940s	Quezon	Tayabas, Quezon	#44 Luis Palad St.	14°01′30″N 121°35′41″E	Upload file
	Rada Ancestral House	Rada Ancestral House	Quezon	Tayabas, Quezon	#46 Luis Palad St.	14°01′29″N 121°35′41″E	Upload file
	Sia-Chee Ancestral House	Sia-Chee Ancestral House, built in 1942	Quezon	Tayabas, Quezon	#48 Luis Palad St.	14°01′42″N 121°35′50″E	Upload file
	Unknown House in 50 Luis Palad Street	Unknown Owner	Quezon	Tayabas, Quezon	#50 Luis Palad Street	14°01′29″N 121°35′41″E	Upload file
	Anacleto-Llorin Ancestral House	Anacleto-Llorin Ancestral House, possibly built in the 1920s	Quezon	Tayabas, Quezon	#37 Luis Palad St.	14°01′30″N 121°57′00″E	Upload file
	Doroteo Nadres Ancestral House	Doroteo Nadres Ancestral House, built in 1938	Quezon	Tayabas, Quezon	#1 Regidor St.	14°01′32″N 121°35′42″E	Upload file
	Unknown 1940's Ancestral House	Unknown 1940's Ancestral House	Quezon	Tayabas, Quezon	#29 Gen. Luna St.	14°01′33″N 121°35′41″E	Upload file
	Dr. Cesar Sia Ancestral House	Dr. Cesar Sia Ancestral House, possibly built in late 1930s	Quezon	Tayabas, Quezon	#27 Gen. Luna cor. Baltazar St.	14°01′34″N 121°35′40″E	Upload file
	Veleña-Agpi Ancestral House	Veleña-Agpi Ancestral House, possibly built between 1910s to 1920s	Quezon	Tayabas, Quezon	#23 Lopez Jaena St.	14°01′37″N 121°35′38″E	Upload file
	Jesus Salvan Ancestral House	Jesus Salvan Ancestral House, possibly built in the 1940s	Quezon	Tayabas, Quezon	#6 Lopez Jaena St.	14°01′36″N 121°35′40″E	Upload file
	Raquel Garcia Ancestral House	Raquel Garcia Ancestral House, completed on Oct. 14, 1950	Quezon	Tayabas, Quezon	#143 Nadres St.	14°01′37″N 121°35′40″E	Upload file
	Carillo-Agodilla Ancestral House	Carillo-Agodilla Ancestral House	Quezon	Tayabas, Quezon	#144 Nadres Street	14°01′37″N 121°35′40″E	Upload file
	Carillo-Agodilla Ancestral House	Carillo-Agodilla Ancestral House	Quezon	Tayabas, Quezon	#1 A. Mabini cor. Nadres St.	14°01′37″N 121°35′40″E	Upload file
	Obcimea House	Obcimea House, possibly built in the 1920s	Quezon	Tayabas, Quezon	#186 Nadres St.	14°01′40″N 121°35′33″E	Upload file
	Adraque Ancestral House	Adraque Ancestral House, possibly built between 1870s-1890s	Quezon	Tayabas, Quezon	#4 F. Burgos St. cor. F. Baltazar St.	14°01′40″N 121°35′33″E	Upload file
	Remigio Abesamis Ancestral House	Remigio Abesamis Ancestral House, built possibly between 1870s-1900s	Quezon	Tayabas, Quezon	#77 F. Baltazar St.	14°01′40″N 121°35′32″E	Upload file
	Ruins of Reyes Ancestral House	Ruins of Reyes Ancestral House, destroyed during the Second World War	Quezon	Tayabas, Quezon		14°01′40″N 121°35′33″E	Upload file
	Val de Avella Ancestral House	Val de Avella Ancestral House, possibly built from 1920s-1930s	Quezon	Tayabas, Quezon	#12 Burgos St.	14°01′38″N 121°35′32″E	Upload file
	Sumilang House Tayabas	Modernist house, possibly built from 1940s to 1950s	Quezon	Tayabas, Quezon	#9 M.J. Sumilang St.	14°01′38″N 121°35′30″E	Upload file
	Zafranco House	Zafranco House, possibly built in the 1940s	Quezon	Tayabas, Quezon	#92 Quezon Ave. cor. P. Gomez St.	14°01′39″N 121°35′29″E	Upload file
	Ermita de la Virgen de las Angustias Tayabas	Ermita de la Virgen de las Angustias	Quezon	Tayabas, Quezon	M. H. del Pilar St.	14°01′38″N 121°35′26″E	Upload file
	Nagar-Torio Ancestral House	Nagar-Torio Ancestral House, owned by Esther Nagar-Torio. Built in the 1900s in Beaux Art style.	Quezon	Tayabas, Quezon	#96 J.P. Rizal cor. M.H. del Pilar St.	14°01′37″N 121°35′25″E	Upload file
	Pedro Orias House	Pedro Orias House, an old stone camarin that was also used as a warehouse	Quezon	Tayabas, Quezon	#5 F. Perez St.	14°01′29″N 121°35′23″E	Upload file
	Jose Sia House	Jose Sia House, possibly built from late 1930s to 1940s	Quezon	Tayabas, Quezon	#15 F. Perez cor. Zamora Sts.	14°01′27″N 121°35′21″E	Upload file
	Obnamia House	Obnamia House, possibly built from 1910s to 1920s	Quezon	Tayabas, Quezon	#25 F. Perez St.	14°01′26″N 121°35′20″E	Upload file
	Rama Lariosa House	Rama Lariosa House, possibly built from late 1910s to 1920s	Quezon	Tayabas, Quezon	#39 F. Perez St.	14°01′25″N 121°35′19″E	Upload file
	Enrique Pasno House	Enrique Pasno House, possibly built in the 1940s	Quezon	Tayabas, Quezon	#54 F. Perez St.	14°12′12″N 121°35′19″E	Upload file
	Rustico Razalan House	Rustico Razalan House, possibly built in the 1940s	Quezon	Tayabas, Quezon	#66 F. Perez St.	14°01′22″N 121°35′17″E	Upload file
	Valencia-Livranda Ancestral House	Valencia-Livranda Ancestral House, possibly built between 1910s to 1920s	Quezon	Tayabas, Quezon	#67 F. Perez St.	14°01′21″N 121°35′17″E	Upload file
	Mortuario de Cementerio de los Indios	Built in 1887	Quezon	Tayabas, Quezon		14°01′21″N 121°35′09″E	Upload file
	Tayabas Municipal Cemetery	Common cemetery for the inhabitants of Tayabas, established in 1911	Quezon	Tayabas, Quezon		14°01′18″N 121°35′15″E	Upload file
	Puente de Baawin	Puente de Baawin, located at 136.55 Kilometer Post	Quezon	Tayabas, Quezon		14°01′15″N 121°35′14″E	Upload file
	Puente de Ubli	Puente de Ubli	Quezon	Tayabas, Quezon		14°01′20″N 121°35′16″E	Upload file
	Ruins of an Old House	Ruins of an Old House at F. Perez St., now a talyer	Quezon	Tayabas, Quezon	F. Perez St.	14°01′22″N 121°35′17″E	Upload file
	Faustino Dava Ancestral House	Faustino Dava Ancestral House, possibly built in the 1930s	Quezon	Tayabas, Quezon	#63 E.J. Vorias St.	14°01′26″N 121°35′21″E	Upload file
	Amador House	Amador House, possibly built in the 1950s	Quezon	Tayabas, Quezon	#62 E. Ponce St.	14°01′33″N 121°35′31″E	Upload file
	Riola House	Riola House, possibly built from late 1940s to 1950s	Quezon	Tayabas, Quezon	108 C.M. Recto st. cor. M. Ponce St.		Upload file
	Barbara Valencia House	Barbara Valencia House, possibly built in the 1920s	Quezon	Tayabas, Quezon	#96 A. dela Cruz St.	14°01′30″N 121°35′27″E	Upload file
	P. Tabernilla House	P. Tabernilla House, possibly built in late 1930s	Quezon	Tayabas, Quezon	#92 A. dela Cruz St.	14°01′31″N 121°35′28″E	Upload file
	P. Avila House	P. Avila House, possibly built in the 1940s	Quezon	Tayabas, Quezon	#24 A. dela Cruz St.	14°01′30″N 121°35′29″E	Upload file
	Pio Tabernilla House Tayabas	Pio Tabernilla House, possibly built in late 1930s	Quezon	Tayabas, Quezon	#84 A. dela Cruz St.	14°01′30″N 121°35′29″E	Upload file
	Palomera House	Palomera House, possibly built in early 1940s	Quezon	Tayabas, Quezon	#14 S. Reyes St.	14°01′37″N 121°35′31″E	Upload file
	Dr. Severina Nadres House	Dr. Severina Nadres House, possibly built in late 1920s to early 1930s	Quezon	Tayabas, Quezon	#77 Quezon Avenue	14°01′37″N 121°35′32″E	Upload file
	Odiaz-Zarzuela House	Odiaz-Zarzuela House, possibly built in late 1930s to early 1940s	Quezon	Tayabas, Quezon	#19 P. Silang St.	14°01′35″N 121°35′32″E	Upload file
	Tayabas Sun Yat Sen School	Tayabas Sun Yat Sen School, former mansion of Ubaldo Potentiano, made of poured concrete, possibly built in the 1930s	Quezon	Tayabas, Quezon	#11 Paterno St.	14°01′34″N 121°35′33″E	Upload file
	Susanna Nadres House	Susanna Nadres House, possibly built in the 1940s	Quezon	Tayabas, Quezon	#13 Paterno St.	14°01′33″N 121°35′34″E	Upload file
	Ruins of a Bahay na Bato	Ruins of a Bahay na Bato along Quezon Avenue, possibly built between 1910s and 1920s	Quezon	Tayabas, Quezon	Quezon Avenue	14°01′35″N 121°35′35″E	Upload file
	Yacaba House	Yacaba House, possibly built in the 1940s	Quezon	Tayabas, Quezon	#58 Quezon Avenue	14°01′34″N 121°35′35″E	Upload file
	Casa Comunidad de Tayabas	Casa Comunidad de Tayabas, built in 1835. Declared a National Historical Landmark by the National Historical Commission of the Philippines	Quezon	Tayabas, Quezon		14°01′31″N 121°35′31″E	Upload file
	Ruins of San Agustin Mansion	Formerly the Enriquez House, built possibly in the 1920s	Quezon	Tayabas, Quezon	in front of Casa Comunidad de Tayabas	14°01′33″N 121°35′31″E	Upload file
	Dizon 's Bakery	Dizon 's Bakery, established in 1901	Quezon	Tayabas, Quezon	#76 J. Rizal St.	14°07′32″N 121°35′32″E	Upload file
	Mallari Distillery	Ancestral house of Josefita Alandy, now turned into a distillery of the finest Tayabas Lambanog since 1908. House was built in 1901	Quezon	Tayabas, Quezon	#71 J. Rizal St.	14°01′31″N 121°35′32″E	Upload file
	Amelia Reyes-Mallari Ancestral House	Amelia Reyes-Mallari Ancestral House, now turned into a restaurant called Casa de la Abuela. House possibly built from late 1930s to early 1940s	Quezon	Tayabas, Quezon	#70 J. Rizal St.	14°01′32″N 121°35′33″E	Upload file
	Salvaña-Ella House	Salvaña-Ella House, built in 1949	Quezon	Tayabas, Quezon	#47 E. Jacinto St.	14°01′30″N 121°35′36″E	Upload file
	Ros-Abragon House, originally situated in a rice farm at Brgy. Lawigue, transferred to the poblacion in the 1950s. House possibly built from 1890s to 1900s	Ros House	Quezon	Tayabas, Quezon	#28 E. Jacinto St.	14°01′33″N 121°35′37″E	Upload file
	Tayabas Glorietta	The city's band stand, used for main events of the town. Possibly built in the 1930s.	Quezon	Tayabas, Quezon		14°01′33″N 121°35′29″E	Upload file
	Puente de Malagonlong	Largest, most impressive Spanish colonial bridge in Tayabas. Built in 1841, completed in 1850 by Fray Antonio Mateos. Declared as a National Cultural Treasure under the title "Spanish Colonial Bridges of Tayabas"	Quezon	Tayabas, Quezon	along Dumaca River	14°00′47″N 121°37′01″E	Upload file
	Puente de Lacawan	Declared as a National Cultural Treasure under the title "Spanish Colonial Bridges of Tayabas"	Quezon	Tayabas, Quezon	Lakawan River, Brgy. Lakawan	14°00′29″N 121°01′42″E	Upload file
	Puente de Mate	Declared as a National Cultural Treasure under the title "Spanish Colonial Bridges of Tayabas"	Quezon	Tayabas, Quezon	Mate River, Brgy. Mate	14°00′18″N 121°38′02″E	Upload file
	Baldevino-Abaya House	Owned by Jovito Baldevino and Eufrancia Abaya. Built before the 1880s.	Quezon	Tayabas, Quezon	605D Nadres St. cor. Gen. Luna St.	14°01′36″N 121°35′43″E	Upload file
	Gob-Lim House	Gob-Lim House, possibly built in the 1940s	Quezon	Tayabas, Quezon	#125 Nadres St.	14°01′37″N 121°35′43″E	Upload file
	Baasis House	Baasis House, possibly built in the 1940s	Quezon	Tayabas, Quezon	#127 Nadres St.	14°01′37″N 121°35′42″E	Upload file
	Puenete de la Ese	Declared as a National Cultural Treasure under the title "Spanish Colonial Bridges of Tayabas"	Quezon	Tayabas, Quezon	Ibiyang Munti, Brgy. Camaysao	14°02′12″N 121°35′01″E	Upload file
	Puente de las Despedidas	Declared as a National Cultural Treasure under the title "Spanish Colonial Bridges of Tayabas"	Quezon	Tayabas, Quezon	Malaking Ibiya, Brgy. Lalo	14°05′10″N 121°34′16″E	Upload file
	Puente de la Princesa	Declared as a National Cultural Treasure under the title "Spanish Colonial Bridges of Tayabas"	Quezon	Tayabas, Quezon	Ilayang Dumacaa, Brgy. Matuena	14°03′55″N 121°34′20″E	Upload file
	Puente de Bai	Declared as a National Cultural Treasure under the title "Spanish Colonial Bridges of Tayabas"	Quezon	Tayabas, Quezon	Bai Creek, Brgy. Dapdap	14°03′46″N 121°33′25″E	Upload file
	Tayabas Rice Terraces	Tayabas Rice Terraces	Quezon	Tayabas, Quezon		14°03′14″N 121°33′34″E	Upload file
	Puente de Reina Isabel II	Puente de Reina Isabel II, built in 1854 by Fray Antonio Mateos. Declared as a National Cultural Treasure under the title "Spanish Colonial Bridges of Tayabas"	Quezon	Tayabas, Quezon	Iyam River, Brgy. Baguio	14°00′36″N 121°34′52″E	Upload file
	Puente de Urbiztondo	Puente de Urbiztondo, built in 1854 by Fray Antonio Mateos. Declared as a National Cultural Treasure under the title "Spanish Colonial Bridges of Tayabas"	Quezon	Tayabas, Quezon	Malao-a River, Brgy. Malao-a	14°00′20″N 121°34′52″E	Upload file
	Puente de San Francisco de Asis	Puente de San Francisco de Asis, built in 1854 by Fray Antonio Mateos. Declared as a National Cultural Treasure under the title "Spanish Colonial Bridges of Tayabas"	Quezon	Tayabas, Quezon	Domoit River, Brgy. Domoit	13°58′06″N 121°32′56″E	Upload file
	Tayabas Calumpang Elementary School	A typical Gabaldon-type school house, built from the 1920s to 1930s	Quezon	Tayabas, Quezon	Brgy. Calumpang, along Tayabas-Sariaya Provincial Road	13°58′44″N 121°33′29″E	Upload file
	Dailo House	Dailo House, possibly built from late 1870s to 1880s	Quezon	Tayabas, Quezon	Brgy. Calumpang, along Tayabas-Sariaya Provincial Road	13°58′46″N 121°33′33″E	Upload file
	Labios House	Labios House, possibly built in late 1930s	Quezon	Tayabas, Quezon	#54 Tayabas-Sariaya Provincial Road	13°59′00″N 121°33′45″E	Upload file
	Puente de Calumpang	Spanish colonial bridge along Tayabas-Sariaya Provincial Road. Not included under the declaration of National Cultural Treasure under the title "Spanish Colonial Bridges of Tayabas"	Quezon	Tayabas, Quezon	Brgy. Calumpang, along Tayabas-Sariaya Provincial Road	13°59′09″N 121°33′48″E	Upload file
	Puentecito de Putol	Small Spanish colonial bridge along Tayabas-Sariaya Provincial Road in Brgy. Putol. Not included under the declaration of National Cultural Treasure under the title "Spanish Colonial Bridges of Tayabas"	Quezon	Tayabas, Quezon	Brgy. Putol	13°59′51″N 121°34′16″E	Upload file
	Puentecito de Malao-a	Small Spanish colonial bridge along Tayabas-Sariaya Provincial Road in Brgy. Malao-a. Locals call the bridge Malao-a Munti. Not included under the declaration of National Cultural Treasure under the title "Spanish Colonial Bridges of Tayabas"	Quezon	Tayabas, Quezon	Brgy. Malao-a	14°00′28″N 121°34′42″E	Upload file
	Puente de Baguio	Spanish colonial bridge along Tayabas-Sariaya Provincial Road in Brgy. Baguio. Not included under the declaration of National Cultural Treasure under the title "Spanish Colonial Bridges of Tayabas"	Quezon	Tayabas, Quezon	Brgy. Baguio	14°00′57″N 121°35′05″E	Upload file
	Puente de Alitao	An urban bridge built in 1793. The earliest surviving colonial bridge in Tayabas. Declared as a National Cultural Treasure under the title "Spanish Colonial Bridges of Tayabas"	Quezon	Tayabas, Quezon	Brgy. Poblacion	14°01′34″N 121°35′25″E	Upload file
	Santuario de las Almas	A mortuary chapel for the Spanish and Filipino elite during the Spanish Era. Also called Ermita de San Roque.	Quezon	Tayabas, Quezon		14°01′16″N 121°35′46″E	Upload file
	Gusali ng Karunungang Pantahanan	An old ancestral house inside the complex of Silang Elementary School, used as a model house for Home Economics classes. Possibly built in the 1950s.	Quezon	Tayabas, Quezon	Inside Silang Elementary School of Tayabas	14°01′25″N 121°35′44″E	Upload file
	Nida Imperial House	Nida Imperial House, possibly built in the late 1930s.	Quezon	Tayabas, Quezon	#40 A. dela Cruz St.	14°01′26″N 121°35′33″E	Upload file
	Bartolome Malabanan House	A house made of wood and stilts, possibly brought in to the town center from the rice fields outside the town. Possibly built in the 1900s.	Quezon	Tayabas, Quezon	#67 A. dela Cruz St.	14°01′27″N 121°35′31″E	Upload file
	Zulaybar House Tayabas.JPG	Possibly built from 1910s to 1920s	Quezon	Tayabas, Quezon	#21 P. Paterno St.	14°01′28″N 121°35′31″E	Upload file
	Oabel House	Oabel House, possibly built from 1900s to 1910s	Quezon	Tayabas, Quezon	#51 F. Baltazar St.	14°00′10″N 121°35′35″E	Upload file
	Santiago Masinag House	Santiago Masinag House, built possibly from the late 1930s to early 1940s	Quezon	Tayabas, Quezon	#49 F. Baltazar St.	14°01′39″N 121°35′35″E	Upload file
	Roces House	Roces House, built possibly from the late 1930s to early 1940s	Quezon	Tayabas, Quezon	#56 P. Silang St. cor. F. Baltazar St.	14°01′38″N 121°35′35″E	Upload file
	Honorata Cabañas House	Honorata Cabañas House, possibly built in the 1940s	Quezon	Tayabas, Quezon	#61 F. Baltazar St.	14°01′39″N 121°35′34″E	Upload file
	Cabigan House	Cabigan House, possibly built in the 1940s	Quezon	Tayabas, Quezon	#38 Quezon Avenue	14°01′33″N 121°35′38″E	Upload file
	Basilica Minore de San Miguel de Arcangel	The largest church in the province of Quezon. Declared a National Cultural Treasure by the National Museum of the Philippines.	Quezon	Tayabas, Quezon	Brgy. Poblacion	14°01′32″N 121°35′28″E	Upload file
