= WQID-LP =

- Hattiesburg, Mississippi; United States
- Broadcast area: Hattiesburg, Mississippi
- Frequency: 105.3 MHz
- Branding: Hot 105.3

Programming
- Format: Urban contemporary

Ownership
- Owner: Hattiesburg Urban Heritage Association

History
- First air date: 2003

Technical information
- Licensing authority: FCC
- Facility ID: 126778
- Class: L1
- ERP: 100 watts
- HAAT: 6.4 meters (21 feet)
- Transmitter coordinates: 31°19′36.60″N 89°17′24.20″W

Links
- Public license information: LMS
- Webcast: Listen Live

WQID-LP (105.3 FM, "Hot 105.3") is a low-power FM radio station licensed to serve the city of Hattiesburg, Mississippi. The station airs an urban contemporary format.
