= KBGX =

- Keaau, Hawaii; United States
- Broadcast area: Hilo, Hawaii
- Frequency: 105.3 MHz
- Branding: Lava 105.3

Programming
- Format: Classic hits

Ownership
- Owner: Carla Morris and Sally Dobson; (Resoante Hawaii LLC)
- Sister stations: KKOA

History
- First air date: 2003-04-14 (as KHIK)
- Former call signs: KHIK (2003–2003); KIHH (2003–2004)

Technical information
- Licensing authority: FCC
- Facility ID: 85061
- Class: C2
- ERP: 28,000 watts
- HAAT: 28 meters
- Transmitter coordinates: 19°43′18″N 155°27′23″W
- Repeaters: 105.3 KBGX-FM2 (Kailua-Kona); 105.3 KBGX-FM5 (Naalehu)

Links
- Public license information: Public file; LMS
- Webcast: Listen Live
- Website: 1053lava.com

KBGX (105.3 FM, "Lava 105.3") is a radio station broadcasting a classic hits format. Licensed to Keaau, Hawaii, the station serves the Hilo area. The station is currently owned by Carla Morris and Sally Dobson, through licensee Resoante Hawaii LLC, and features programming from Citadel Media's "The True Oldies Channel" satellite feed.

== History ==
The station went on the air as KBGX on 2004-04-14. The station covers most of the Big Island from about 7,000 feet (2,100 m) on Mauna Kea with a booster transmitter in Kona at 6,500 feet (2,000 m) on the same channel.
