= WQCN-LP =

- Richmond, Virginia; United States
- Frequency: 105.3 MHz
- Branding: The Choice 105.3FM

Programming
- Format: Gospel

Ownership
- Owner: Faith & Love Fellowship Church

Technical information
- Licensing authority: FCC
- Facility ID: 193415
- Class: LP1
- ERP: 100 watts
- HAAT: 22 metres (72 ft)
- Transmitter coordinates: 37°30′25.5″N 77°28′57.9″W

Links
- Public license information: LMS
- Webcast: Listen live
- Website: www.choice1053.com

WQCN-LP (105.3 FM, "The Choice 105.3FM") is a radio station licensed to serve the community of Richmond, Virginia. The station is owned by Faith & Love Fellowship Church and airs a gospel music format.

The station was assigned the WQCN-LP call letters by the Federal Communications Commission on May 18, 2015.
