= WAOX =

- Staunton, Illinois; United States
- Frequency: 105.3 MHz
- Branding: The Ox 105.3

Programming
- Format: Hot adult contemporary
- Affiliations: ABC Radio

Ownership
- Owner: Talley Broadcasting Corporation

History
- First air date: December 1, 1999
- Former call signs: WSTN-FM (1998–1999, CP)

Technical information
- Licensing authority: FCC
- Facility ID: 64563
- Class: A
- ERP: 6,000 watts
- HAAT: 87 meters
- Transmitter coordinates: 39°2′37.00″N 89°44′56.00″W

Links
- Public license information: Public file; LMS
- Website: wax.com

WAOX (105.3 FM) is a radio station broadcasting a hot adult contemporary format. It is licensed to Staunton, Illinois, United States. The station is currently owned by Talley Broadcasting Corporation and features programming from ABC Radio.

== History ==
The station went on the air as WSTN-FM on August 21, 1998. On April 30, 1999, the station changed its call sign to the current WAOX.
