= WOUX =

- St. Marys, West Virginia; United States
- Broadcast area: Parkersburg, West Virginia; Harrisville, West Virginia; Marietta, Ohio
- Frequency: 105.3 MHz
- Branding: WOUX 105.3

Programming
- Format: Catholic Religious

Ownership
- Owner: St. Paul Radio Co.

History
- First air date: September 7, 2014

Technical information
- Licensing authority: FCC
- Facility ID: 184911
- Class: A
- ERP: 2,800 watts
- HAAT: 127.7 meters (419 ft)
- Transmitter coordinates: 39°17′42.50″N 81°13′42.00″W

Links
- Public license information: Public file; LMS

WOUX is a Catholic Religious formatted broadcast radio station licensed to St. Marys, West Virginia, serving Parkersburg and Harrisville in West Virginia and Marietta in Ohio. WOUX is owned and operated by St. Paul Radio Co.
