= KWBF (AM) =

- Lubbock, Texas; United States
- Broadcast area: Lubbock metropolitan area
- Frequency: 1420 kHz
- Branding: Walk By Faith Radio 98.7 FM 1420 AM

Programming
- Format: Christian Contemporary

Ownership
- Owner: Victor Flores; (Flores Communications, LLC)

History
- First air date: 1966 (as KLFB)
- Former call signs: KLFB (1967–2005); KJDL (2005–2019)

Technical information
- Licensing authority: FCC
- Facility ID: 17589
- Class: D
- Power: 500 watts day 140 watts night
- Transmitter coordinates: 33°36′49.3″N 101°52′31.6″W
- Translator: 98.7 K254CI (Lubbock)

Links
- Public license information: Public file; LMS
- Website: KWBF on Facebook

KWBF (1420 AM) is a Christian Contemporary formatted broadcast radio station licensed to Lubbock, Texas, serving the Lubbock metropolitan area. The station is owned and operated by Victor Flores, through licensee Flores Communications, LLC.

== History ==
In previous incarnations, the station was owned by John Flache d/b/a "La Fiesta Broadcasting", which led to the original name KLFB. Two competing applications had been tendered in the early sixties by La Fiesta Broadcasting and by "Mid Cities Broadcasting", then owner of KOYL AM/FM Odessa. The station signed on in 1967 as the area's first exclusively Spanish language station. KLFB was sold to a partnership of Drew Ballard and Marcelo Tafoya (owners of 92.1 Hutto Texas) in 1977. They filed for night authority, which was granted in 1979. The station operated from one site (Buddy Holly Park in north Lubbock) by day and a second site (82nd and Ash) in south Lubbock by night.

Eventually, the partners agreed to an exchange where they'd take sole ownership of one station apiece. Ballard became sole owner of KLFB, and Tafoya became sole owner of KRGT Hutto. Ballard operated the station for many years, eventually LMAing the station to a local Catholic lay group.

KLFB was purchased in September 2005 by Walker Broadcasting and Communications. Upon purchase, the format was changed to News/Talk, including a local morning news show, and the call sign changed to KJDL. Former KCBD news director Dave Walker oversaw operations as general manager with former KAMC TV reporter James Clark as news director. Morning news shows were anchored by radio personality Ron Reid and news director James Clark.

Content was provided by CBS Radio Network and USA Radio Network; syndicated programming on the station included Lars Larson, Dennis Miller, Jim Bohannon, Imus in the Morning, Gordon Liddy, Jim Sumpter, Monica Crowley, The Twilight Zone, Meet the Press, and Ed McMahon's Lifestyles Live, as well as various old time radio programs.

As of February 22, 2010, the station changed to a Classic Country format. KJDL was the local affiliate for Houston Astros baseball and aired select NFL and NCAA broadcasts from Compass Sports Media while airing the Classic Country format.

On February 24, 2014, KJDL changed their format to contemporary hit radio, branded as "Z98.5" (frequency in branding is for FM translator K253BD 98.5 FM Lubbock).

On February 27, 2015, KJDL changed their format to alternative rock, branded as "The Edge".

On August 1, 2015, KJDL changed their format to classic country, branded as "Raider Country".

Effective December 1, 2018, Walker Broadcasting & Communications sold KJDL and translator K254CI to Flores Communications, LLC for $140,000. The station changed its call sign to KWBF on April 17, 2019.

== Programming ==
Until February 24, 2014, the station featured a simulcast of its then-sister station True Country 105.3's morning show, syndicated satellite classic country program throughout the day, and an afternoon drive show with Larry Byers called "The Larry-go-round". Houston Astros Baseball as well as New Deal and Shallowater High School sports used to be featured on the station. An afternoon radio show hosted by Lee Barron from 4:45pm-5pm Monday through Friday focuses on local Texas crop prices and conditions. Lee also hosts a two-hour show on Saturday mornings with his son, Jarrod Barron, and contains much of the same information covered during the weekday broadcasts, albeit updated as of Friday night, as well as interviews with various farmers, producers, and young members of 4-H and FFA from surrounding towns.

As Walk By Faith Radio, KWBF airs a mix of News/Talk and Christian music programming. KWBF became the new flagship for the regionally-syndicated Pratt on Texas radio show in February 2021. Later that year, Ken Adams started hosting local talk shows on KWBF, eventually settling in to the 12pm-1pm Weekday timeslot. In early 2023, Bob Rogers, who used to co-host "Reason, Religion & Reality" on News/Talk 95.1 & 790, KFYO; joined KWBF for a Saturday morning talkshow. On October 26, 2023, Michael McDermott announced he was moving his talkshow "McDermott at Large" from KFYO to KWBF, effective October 30, 2023.

== Translators ==
Call sign	Frequency	City of license	FID	ERP (W)	Class	FCC info
K254CI	98.7 FM	Lubbock, Texas	143895	99	D	LMS
