= KDDQ =

Radio station in Comanche, Oklahoma

- Comanche, Oklahoma; United States
- Frequency: 105.3 MHz
- Branding: 105.3 The Eagle

Programming
- Format: Classic rock

Ownership
- Owner: Mollman Media, Inc.

History
- First air date: 1982 (as KHME)
- Former call signs: KHME (1981–1988)

Technical information
- Licensing authority: FCC
- Facility ID: 37687
- Class: A
- ERP: 6,000 watts
- HAAT: 91 meters (299 ft)
- Transmitter coordinates: 34°26′12″N 97°54′47″W

Links
- Public license information: Public file; LMS
- Webcast: Listen Live
- Website: 1053theeagle.com

KDDQ (105.3 FM) is a radio station broadcasting a classic rock music format. Licensed to Comanche, Oklahoma, United States. The station is currently owned by Mollman Media, Inc.
