= Región =

- Type: Daily newspaper
- Founder: Bernardo Aza y González-Escalada
- Founded: 24 July 1923
- Ceased publication: 30 November 1983
- Language: Spanish
- Headquarters: Oviedo
- Country: Spain
- ISSN: 9968-9359

Región (Spanish: [re'xjon], 'Region') was a Spanish newspaper published in the city of Oviedo between 1923 and 1983.

== History ==
Founded in 1923, it started as an ideologically Catholic and conservative newspaper. Its first issue was published on the 24 July 1923, by Bernardo Aza y González-Escalada. Among the first members of its administrative council was Ricardo Vázquez-Prada Blanco, who became the newspaper's most important director, being in charge for over three decades. The newspaper began publication from the workshops located on Melquiades Álvarez Street in Oviedo.

During the era of the Second Spanish Republic, it became the mouthpiece of the Asturian right-wing movement, and although it leaned more toward traditionalism, it supported the conservative coalition CEDA. After the outbreak of the Spanish Civil War, its facilities ended up in the rebel-controlled zone, although due to the military situation, its workshops had to be moved to Luarca. During the Francoist dictatorship, it continued to be published and maintained its traditionalist and integrist editorial line. In 1960, its headquarters were moved to Fray Ceferino Street in Oviedo, taking advantage of the relocation to modernize its machinery. Due to financial problems that the newspaper had been facing for several years, Región eventually shut down in 1983. Its final issue appeared on November 30, 1983.
