= WMPI =

Scottsburg, Indiana; United States
- Broadcast area: Louisville metropolitan area
- Frequency: 105.3 MHz
- Branding: I 105.3

Programming
- Format: Country

Ownership
- Owner: D.R. Rice Broadcasting, Inc.

History
- First air date: December 16, 1966

Technical information
- Licensing authority: FCC
- Facility ID: 14957
- Class: A
- ERP: 2,200 watts
- HAAT: 156 meters (512 ft)
- Transmitter coordinates: 38°42′44.00″N 85°41′12.00″W

Links
- Public license information: Public file; LMS
- Website: i1053.com

WMPI (105.3 FM) is a commercial radio station licensed to Scottsburg, Indiana, United States, and serving the Louisville metropolitan area. Currently owned by D.R. Rice Broadcasting, Inc., it features a country music format.

The station signed on the air on December 16, 1966.
