= KNOD =

- Harlan, Iowa; United States
- Frequency: 105.3 MHz
- Branding: Kool Gold 105.3

Programming
- Format: Classic hits
- Affiliations: Fox News Radio; Westwood One

Ownership
- Owner: Wireless Broadcasting, L.L.C.

History
- First air date: 1979

Technical information
- Licensing authority: FCC
- Facility ID: 15141
- Class: C3
- ERP: 25,000 watts
- HAAT: 86.0 meters (282.2 ft)
- Transmitter coordinates: 41°37′00″N 95°16′10″W

Links
- Public license information: Public file; LMS
- Webcast: Listen Live
- Website: knodfm.com

KNOD (105.3 FM, "Kool Gold 105.3") is a radio station broadcasting a classic hits music format. Licensed to Harlan, Iowa, United States, the station is currently owned by Wireless Broadcasting, L.L.C. and features programming from Fox News Radio and Westwood One.
