= KXRC =

- Durango, Colorado; United States
- Frequency: 105.3 MHz
- Branding: X Rock 105.3

Programming
- Format: Classic rock

Ownership
- Owner: KRJ Company

History
- First air date: 2013
- Call sign meaning: X Rock

Technical information
- Licensing authority: FCC
- Facility ID: 88463
- Class: C3
- ERP: 16,500 watts
- HAAT: 123 meters (404 ft)
- Transmitter coordinates: 37°15′46″N 107°53′58″W

Links
- Public license information: Public file; LMS

KXRC (105.3 FM) is a radio station licensed to Durango, Colorado. The station broadcasts a Classic rock format and is owned by KRJ Company. The station's name and logo refer to a popular eponymous rock climbing site, X-Rock, located on the north edge of town.
