= KQOR =

- Mena, Arkansas; United States
- Frequency: 102.1 MHz
- Branding: The Mountain 102.1

Programming
- Format: Classic country
- Affiliations: Citadel Media

Ownership
- Owner: Ouachita Broadcasting, Inc.

History
- First air date: 2001
- Former frequencies: 105.3 MHz (2001–2025)

Technical information
- Licensing authority: FCC
- Facility ID: 85585
- Class: C3
- ERP: 24,000 watts
- HAAT: 143 meters (469 ft)
- Transmitter coordinates: 34°32′42″N 94°18′21″W

Links
- Public license information: Public file; LMS
- Webcast: Listen Live

KQOR (102.1 FM, "The Mountain 102.1") is a radio station broadcasting a classic country music format. Licensed to Mena, Arkansas, United States, the station is currently owned by Ouachita Broadcasting, Inc.

== History ==
The station originally began broadcasting in 2001, on 105.3 MHz, known as "Classic hits 105.3 KQOR", and featured programming from Westwood One.

On October 4, 2023, the station switched to an classic country format, known as "105.3 The Mountain".

On May 12, 2025, the frequency was changed from 105.3 MHz, to 102.1 MHz, to avoid interference with another station, and to increase watts. The station has since been known as "102.1 The Mountain".
