= Tayabas =

Component city in Quezon, Philippines

- Component city
- City of Tayabas
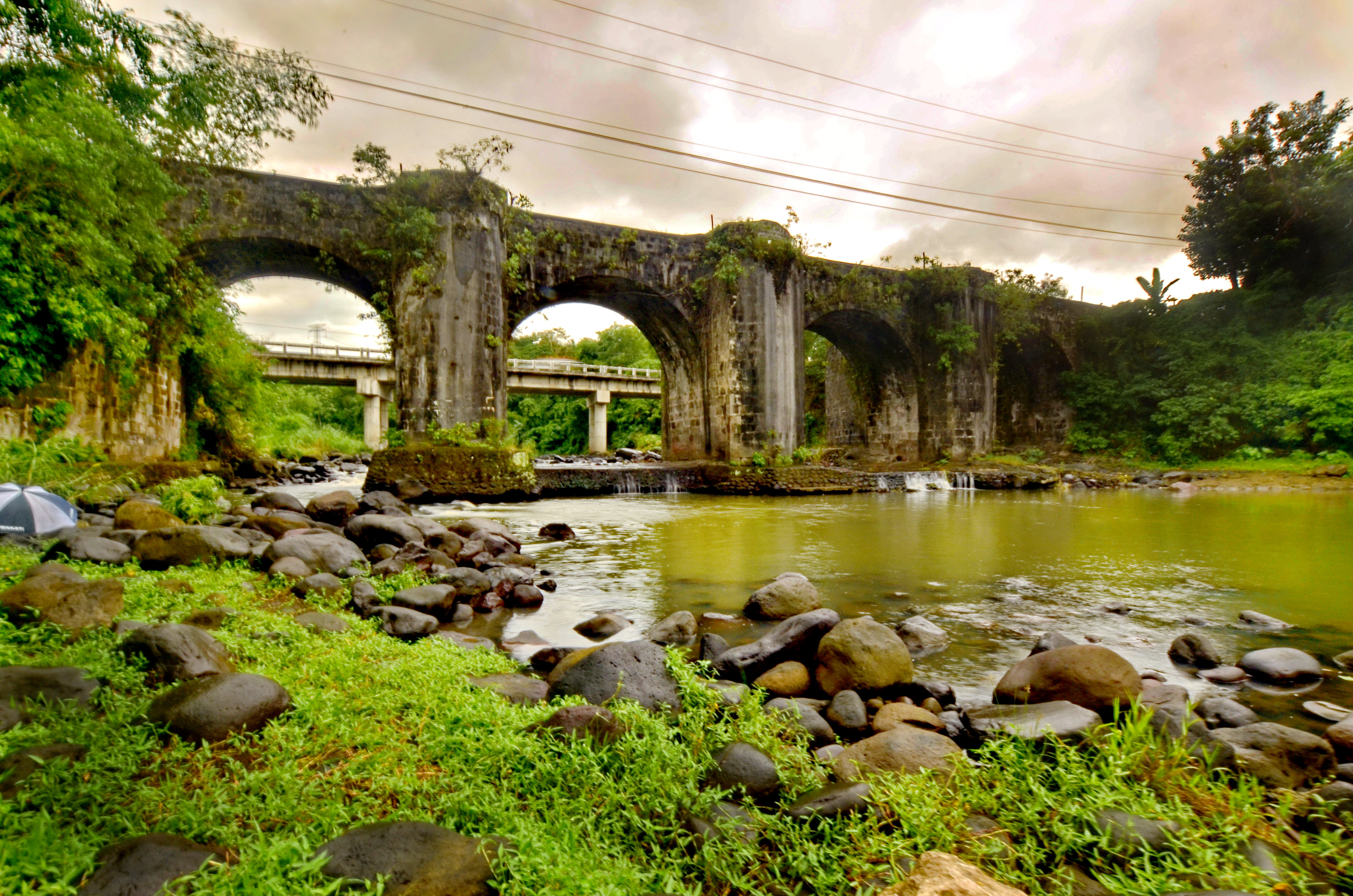
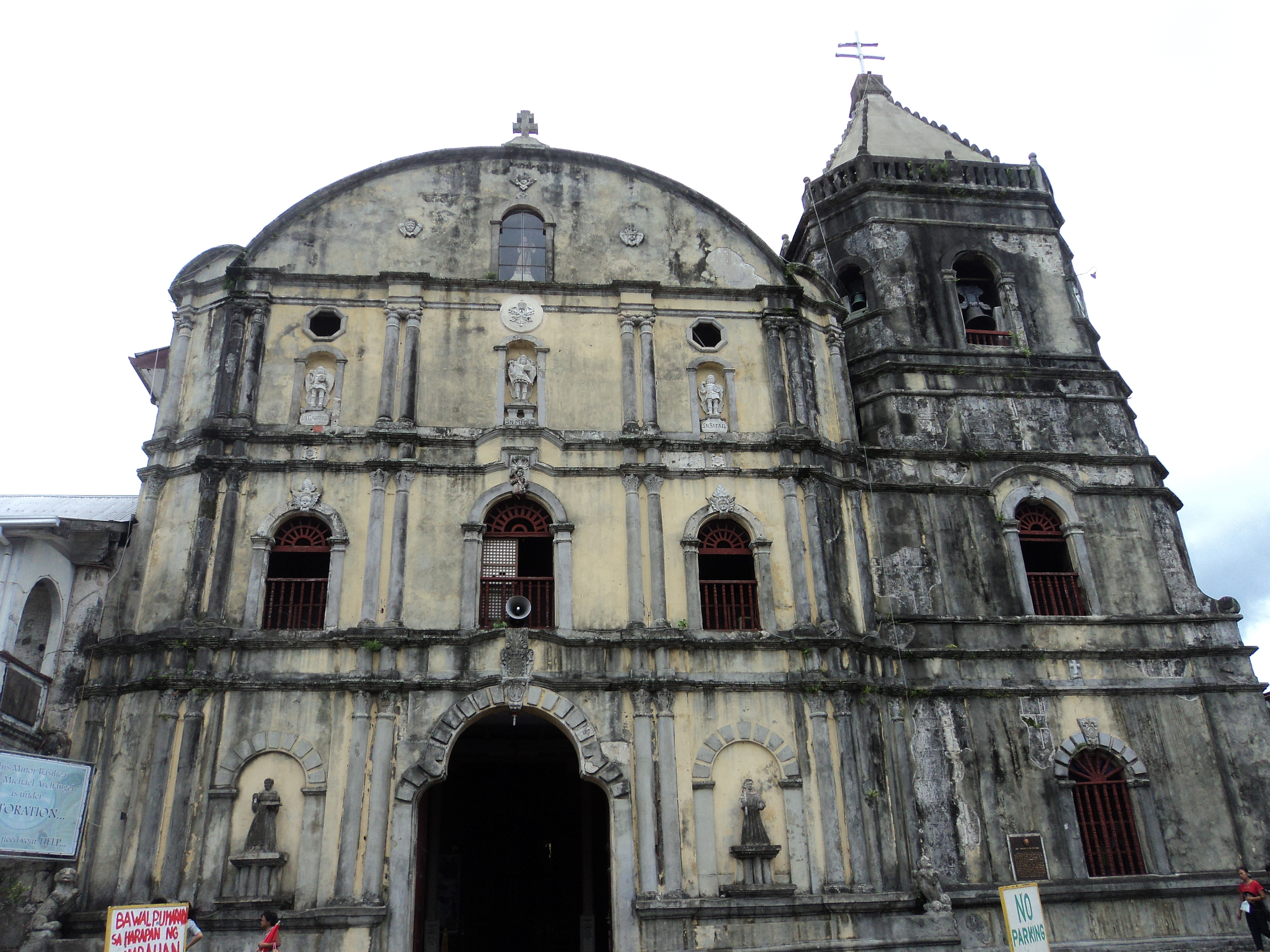
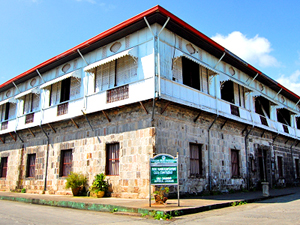
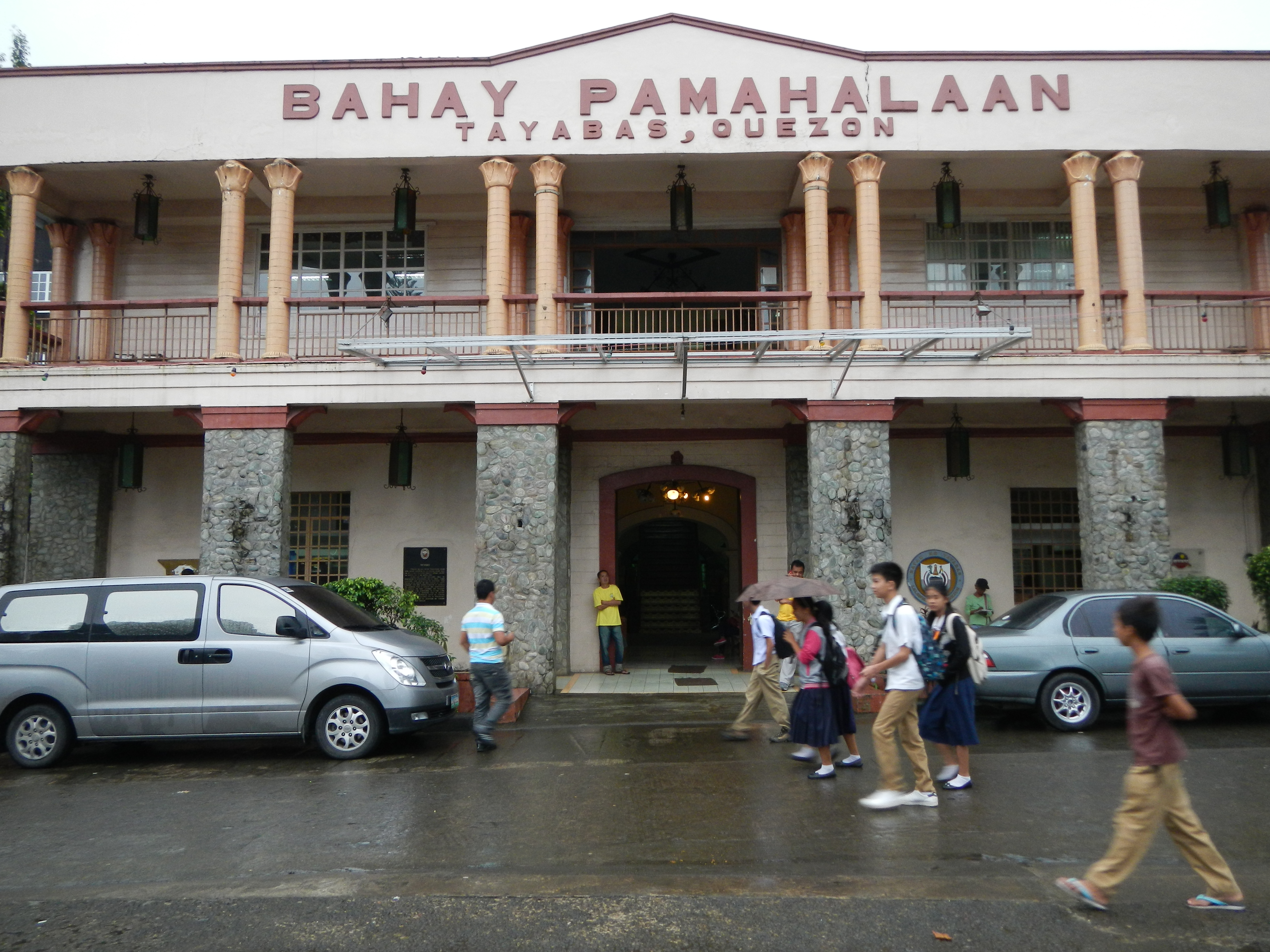
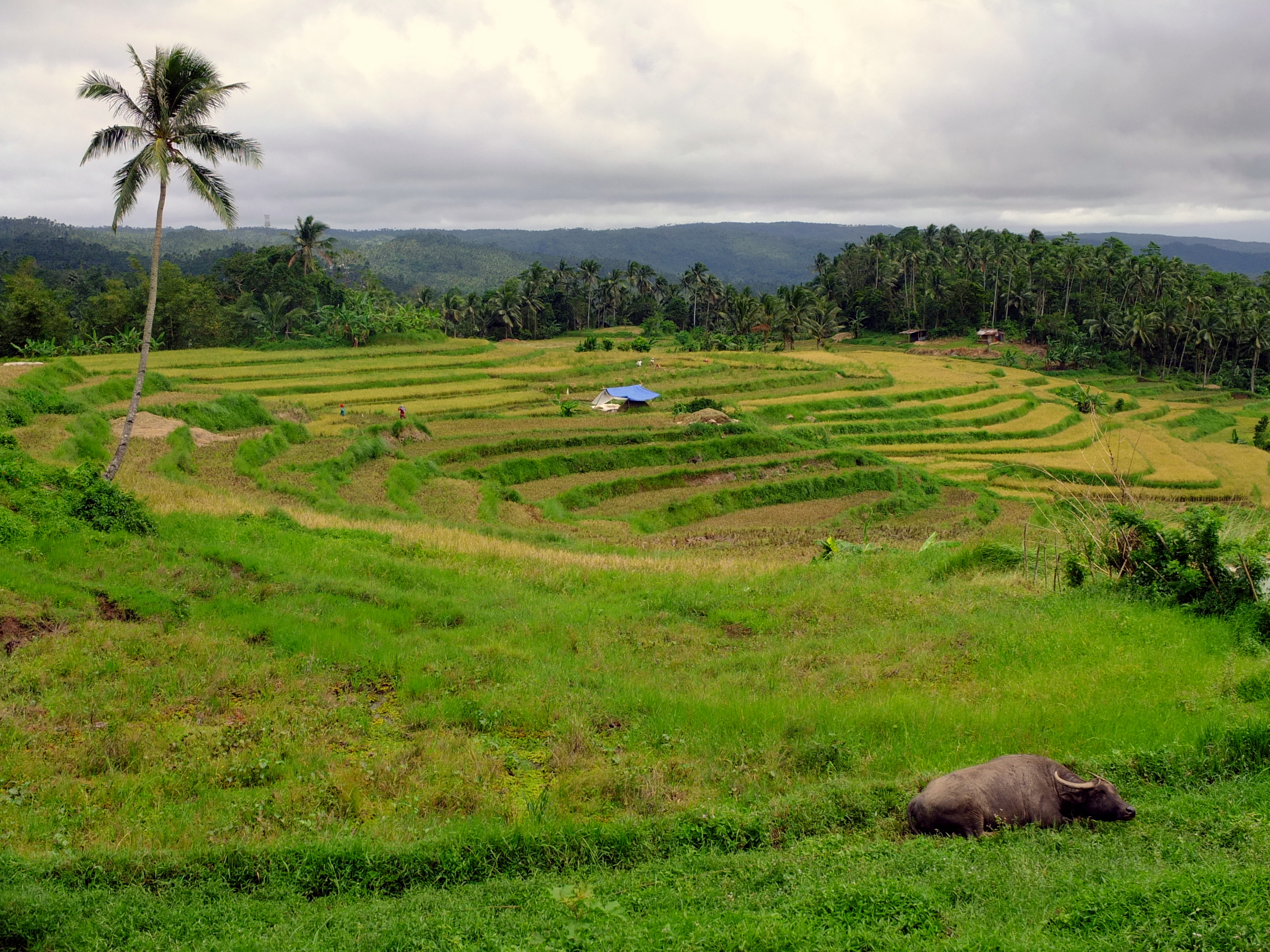
- Malagonlong Bridge, Minor Basilica of Saint Michael Archangel, Casa Comunidad de Tayabas, City Hall, Tayabas Rice Terraces

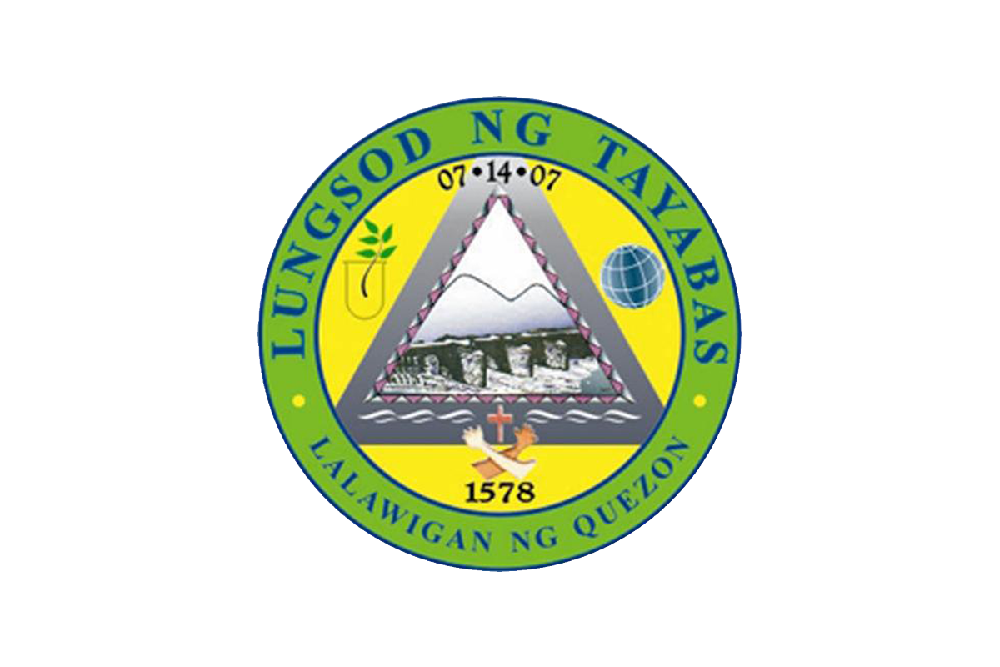
- Flag Seal
- Nicknames: "La Muy Noble Villa"; (The Most Noble Villa): "City of Festivals"; "Home of The Finest Lambanog"; "Rest and Recreation Destination of Quezon"; "City of 11 Spanish Bridges"; "Old Capital of Tayabas Province"
- Motto: "Tayabas: Wala kang Katumbas"
- Map of Quezon with Tayabas highlighted
- Interactive map of Tayabas
- Location within the Philippines
- Coordinates: 14°01′N 121°35′E
- Country: Philippines
- Region: Calabarzon
- Province: Quezon
- District: 1st district
- Founded: 1578
- Cityhood: July 14, 2007 (Lost cityhood in 2008 and 2010)
- Affirmed Cityhood: February 15, 2011
- Barangays: 66 (see Barangays)

Government
  - Type: Sangguniang Panlungsod
  - Mayor: Anthony Piwa Lim
  - Vice Mayor: Rosauro Q. Dalida
  - Representative: Wilfrido Mark M. Enverga
  - City Council: Members: Wenda S. de Torres; Janne Phaula A. Nadres; Nicomedes C. Abesamis; Farley L. Abrigo; Carmelo S. Cabarrubias; Elsa L. Rubio; Dino M. Romero; Luzviminda B. Cuadra; Filemon P. Villanueva Jr.; Mercedita C. Reyes
  - Electorate: 70,696 voters (2025)

Area
  - Total: 230.95 km^{2} (89.17 sq mi)
- Elevation: 228 m (748 ft)
- Highest elevation: 2,163 m (7,096 ft)
- Lowest elevation: 0 m (0 ft)

Population (2024 census)
  - Total: 115,318
  - Density: 499.32/km^{2} (1,293.2/sq mi)
  - Households: 27,849
- Demonym(s): Tayabasin, Tayabense, Tayabeño (archaic)

Economy
  - Income class: 3rd city income class
  - Poverty incidence: 3.33% (2023)
  - Revenue: ₱ 1,117 million (2024)
  - Assets: ₱ 408.8 million (2024)
  - Expenditure: ₱ 473.8 million (2024)
  - Liabilities: ₱ 1,205 million (2024)

Service provider
  - Electricity: Manila Electric Company (Meralco)
- Time zone: UTC+8 (PST)
- ZIP code: 4327
- PSGC: 0405647000 045647000, 0405647000
- IDD : area code: +63 (0)42
- Native languages: Tagalog
- Website: tayabas.gov.ph

Tayabas, officially the City of Tayabas (Filipino: Lungsod ng Tayabas), is a component city in the province of Quezon, Philippines. According to the 2024 census, it has a population of 115,318 people.

The city is known for various historical landmarks like ancestral houses, more than twenty Spanish colonial stone bridges, 16th century stone crosses believed to be abodes of nature spirits, festivals, and local delicacies like lambanog and various desserts, alongside resorts and rest and recreation facilities. It was the former capital of Quezon (then named Tayabas). The prevalent architectural sites of the city, including its bridges, has led numerous scholars to campaign its inclusion in the UNESCO World Heritage List.

== Etymology ==
Sociologist Rolando V. Redor advanced that the name Tayabas was suggested because of the abundance of ferns called ''tagabas''.

According to one reference, Tayabas ''tayaban''. Tayaban is a night creature known for having wings that glow like tropical fireflies.

From the dialect of Tayabas Tagalog, there is also the word ''tayaba'', which is an indigenous practice of the igba for planting.

One of the popular theories for the origin of the name Tayabas is that it comes from the word ''bayabas'' (guava), but the said fruit is not native to the Philippines.

== History ==
=== Early history ===
Tayabas is at the center of the province's long-settled heartland, which possessed the best lands, the oldest parishes, and the most active commercial centers. The provincial heartland was later described by Manuel L. Quezon as having the "richest and gayest places in the province."

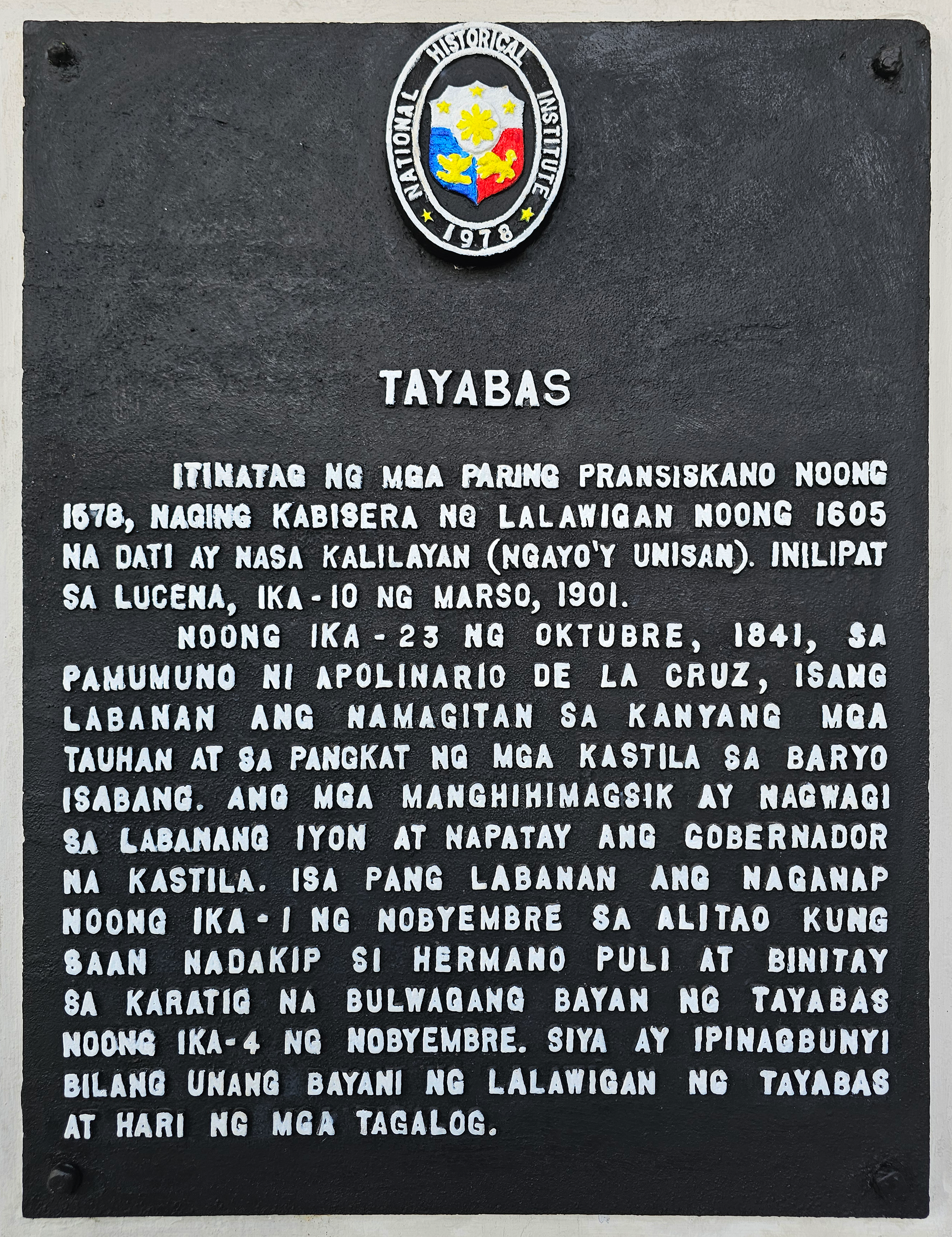
National historical marker installed in the old city hall in 1978

In 1578, Fray Juan de Plasencia and Fray Diego de Oropesa, two Franciscan missionaries from Spain founded the town of Tayabas in order to spread Christianity to its natives. Prior to the occupation, however, the native Tayabenses lived in rural settlements (barangay) typical of those times, headed by chiefs and a council of elders. During this time, ancestral stones and rocks that the people believed to be abodes of nature spirits were turned to stone crosses due to the influx of Christianity. They exist up to this day, however, many have been stolen, uprooted, sold and destroyed due to the belief of foreign treasure hunters that each cross contains treasures.

Historians and archaeologists have disproved these claims by treasure hunters and have found no treasure in any archaic stone crosses in Tayabas. The destruction and uprooting of these crosses has "endangered the stone cross tradition of Tayabas." By the end of the 1700s, Tayabas had 7,396 native families and 12 Spanish Filipino families.

From 1605 to 1901, Tayabas was the capital of the Province of Tayabas, now known as Quezon. In the 19th century, Tayabas was among the biggest towns in the country. Its Minor Basilica of St. Michael the Archangel, which was enlarged in the mid-1850s, is the longest church in the country and is a testament to its past.

In more than three centuries of Spanish occupation, only eight cities and towns were given the title of Villa, and Tayabas was one of them. These are La Villa del Santisimo Nombre de Jesus de Cebu in 1565, La Villa de Santiago de Libon (Albay, 1573), La Villa Fernandina de Vigan (Ilocos, 1574), La Villa Rica de Arevalo (Iloilo, 1581), La Noble Villa de Pila (Laguna, 1610), La Muy Noble Villa de Tayabas (Tayabas, 1703), La Villa de Bacolor (Pampanga, 1765), La Villa de Lipa (Batangas, 1887). While the others were conferred the title of noble villas, Tayabas was given the status of 'most noble' villa.

In the book The Philippines, written by French traveler Jean Baptiste Mallat, and published in 1846, it appears that Tayabas had more than 21,000 people at that time. This was reduced to 16,000 when Lucena became an independent town in 1879. Due to low population growth during the Spanish period, this number remained unchanged until the coming of the Americans.

=== Philippine Revolution ===
Casa Comunidad, a centuries-old building, is the place where Apolinario "Hermano Pule" Dela Cruz was tried and sentenced to death in 1841. It was restored in the 1990s through funds donated by the Friends of Casa Comunidad, an organization of affluent Manila-based Tayabenses.

During the Philippine Revolution, a Spanish garrison occupying the massive church and convent buildings was besieged by Miguel Malvar's forces. The siege lasted 3 months, spanning from 24 June 1898 to 13 August 1898. The siege would end when the Spanish garrison unconditionally surrendered to Malvar's forces.

=== World War II ===
Tayabas features numerous Spanish-era bridges which mirror its rich architectural past and serve as crucial connections to the city. Two of the longest bridges in Tayabas are the Malagonlong Bridge and the Malaoa bridges. During the second world war, Imperial Japanese Forces rapidly advanced toward the city, forcing the locals to rush fortifications.

In a bid to slow the Japanese forces down, the locals planted explosives underneath the Malagonlong Bridge. The plan to destroy the bridge however was unsuccessful as the explosives failed to destroy the bridge. This can be attributed to the bridge's design, which was made to be extremely durable. Malagonlong Bridge was later declared a national historical site.

Later on in the war, the city of Tayabas became the target of small bombing runs from enemy forces. It again suffered a terrible blow near the end of World War II when it was completely burned to the ground after a bombing raid on 15 March 1945. Prior to that, the old houses of Tayabas rivaled those of Vigan's Spanish-era structures.

The local resistance continued their efforts to fight the Japanese all the way to when American Liberation forces and the Philippine Commonwealth troops finally secured the area.

=== Cityhood ===
On July 14, 2007, the municipality held a plebiscite to ratify the conversion of the said act, with the residents voting in favor of the move, although there was a low turnout of voters for the plebiscite.

The Supreme Court declared the cityhood law of Tayabas and 15 other cities unconstitutional after a petition filed by the League of Cities of the Philippines in its ruling on November 18, 2008. On December 22, 2009, the cityhood law of Tayabas and 15 other municipalities regain its status as cities again after the court reversed its ruling on November 18, 2008. On August 23, 2010, the court reinstated its ruling on November 18, 2008, causing Tayabas and 15 cities to become regular municipalities. Finally, on February 15, 2011, Tayabas becomes a city again including the 15 municipalities declaring that the conversion to cityhood met all legal requirements.

After six years of legal battle, in its board resolution, the League of Cities of the Philippines acknowledged and recognized the cityhood of Tayabas and 15 other cities.

== Geography ==
Tayabas is 9 kilometers (5.6 mi) from Lucena and 139 kilometers (86 mi) from Manila and it is accessible by land from Metro Manila passing through Rizal and Laguna east via Manila East Road or via South Luzon Expressway.

=== Barangays ===
Tayabas is politically subdivided into 66 barangays, as indicated below. Each barangay consists of puroks and some have sitios.

- Alitao
- Alsam Ibaba
- Alsam Ilaya
- Alupay
- Angeles Zone I (Poblacion)
- Angeles Zone II
- Angeles Zone III
- Angeles Zone IV
- Angustias Zone I (Poblacion)
- Angustias Zone II
- Angustias Zone III
- Angustias Zone IV
- Anos
- Ayaas
- Baguio
- Banilad
- Ibabang Bukal
- Ilayang Bukal
- Calantas
- Calumpang
- Camaysa
- Dapdap
- Kanlurang Domoit
- Silangang Domoit
- Gibanga
- Ibas
- Ilasan Ibaba
- Ilasan Ilaya
- Ipilan
- Isabang
- Katigan Kanluran
- Katigan Silangan
- Lakawan
- Lalo
- Lawigue
- Lita
- Malaoa
- Masin
- Mate
- Mateuna
- Mayuwi
- Ibabang Nangka
- Ilayang Nangka
- Opias
- Ibabang Palale
- Ilayang Palale
- Kanlurang Palale
- Silangang Palale
- Pandakaki
- Pook
- Potol
- San Diego Zone I (Poblacion)
- San Diego Zone II (Poblacion)
- San Diego Zone III
- San Diego Zone IV
- San Isidro Zone I (Poblacion)
- San Isidro Zone II
- San Isidro Zone III
- San Isidro Zone IV
- San Roque Zone I (Poblacion)
- San Roque Zone II
- Talolong
- Tamlong
- Tongko
- Valencia
- Wakas

=== Climate ===
Climate data for Tayabas (1991–2020, extremes 1970–2023)
Month	Jan	Feb	Mar	Apr	May	Jun	Jul	Aug	Sep	Oct	Nov	Dec	Year
Record high °C (°F)	32.5 (90.5)	32.5 (90.5)	33.5 (92.3)	36.0 (96.8)	36.0 (96.8)	35.5 (95.9)	34.6 (94.3)	35.6 (96.1)	35.5 (95.9)	35.0 (95.0)	34.0 (93.2)	32.4 (90.3)	36.0 (96.8)
Mean daily maximum °C (°F)	27.8 (82.0)	28.4 (83.1)	29.9 (85.8)	31.8 (89.2)	32.5 (90.5)	31.9 (89.4)	31.1 (88.0)	31.2 (88.2)	31.1 (88.0)	30.4 (86.7)	29.4 (84.9)	28.2 (82.8)	30.3 (86.5)
Daily mean °C (°F)	24.8 (76.6)	25.1 (77.2)	26.2 (79.2)	27.7 (81.9)	28.3 (82.9)	28.0 (82.4)	27.4 (81.3)	27.4 (81.3)	27.2 (81.0)	26.8 (80.2)	26.3 (79.3)	25.4 (77.7)	26.7 (80.1)
Mean daily minimum °C (°F)	21.8 (71.2)	21.8 (71.2)	22.6 (72.7)	23.7 (74.7)	24.2 (75.6)	24.0 (75.2)	23.6 (74.5)	23.5 (74.3)	23.2 (73.8)	23.3 (73.9)	23.3 (73.9)	22.6 (72.7)	23.1 (73.6)
Record low °C (°F)	17.5 (63.5)	16.8 (62.2)	17.9 (64.2)	18.3 (64.9)	20.6 (69.1)	21.0 (69.8)	18.9 (66.0)	19.3 (66.7)	19.4 (66.9)	19.4 (66.9)	18.6 (65.5)	18.7 (65.7)	16.8 (62.2)
Average rainfall mm (inches)	165.2 (6.50)	132.8 (5.23)	109.6 (4.31)	99.5 (3.92)	159.7 (6.29)	215.3 (8.48)	273.1 (10.75)	186.4 (7.34)	271.6 (10.69)	452.0 (17.80)	545.2 (21.46)	534.3 (21.04)	3,144.7 (123.81)
Average rainy days (≥ 1 mm)	16	12	9	7	12	14	17	15	16	19	22	22	181
Average relative humidity (%)	86	85	84	81	82	84	85	85	86	86	87	87	85
Source: PAGASA

== Demographics ==
Population census of Tayabas
Year	Pop.	±% p.a.
1903	14,740	—
1918	14,983	+0.11%
1939	18,172	+0.92%
1948	16,989	−0.75%
1960	25,758	+3.53%
1970	35,166	+3.16%
1975	37,756	+1.44%
1980	42,137	+2.22%
1990	54,355	+2.58%
1995	64,449	+3.24%
2000	70,985	+2.09%
2007	87,252	+2.89%
2010	91,428	+1.72%
2015	99,779	+1.68%
2020	112,658	+2.59%
2024	115,318	+0.56%
Source: Philippine Statistics Authority

== Economy ==
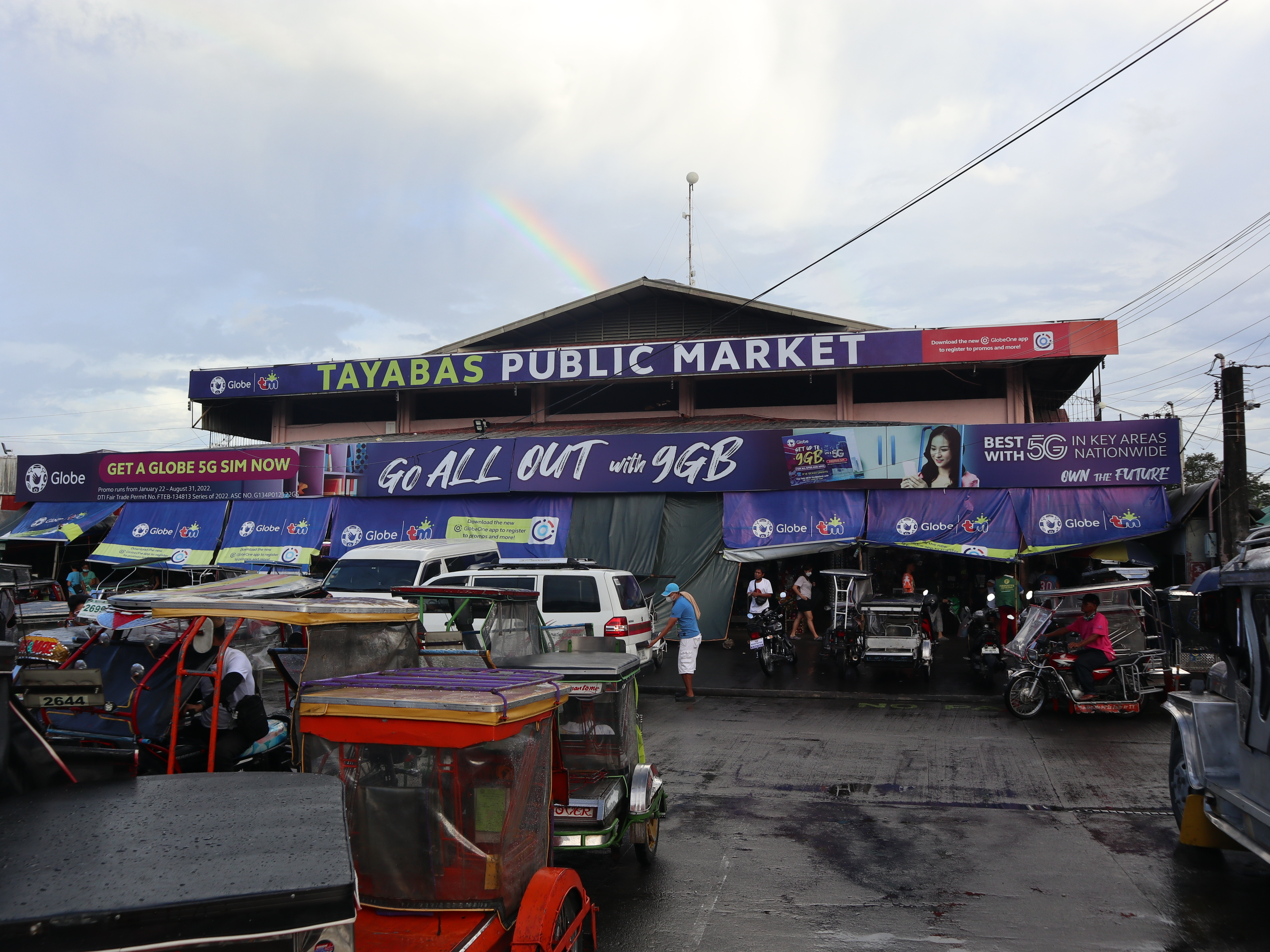
Tayabas Public Market

Poverty incidence of Tayabas (%)

Source: Philippine Statistics Authority

The major agricultural products of Tayabas are rice and coconut. It is also known for sweet delicacies, budin (cassava cake) and lambanog.

== Notable Places of Interest ==
Tayabas is rich in history as it was the capital of Tayabas Province (Now in Quezon) during Spanish era. There are falls, caves, river, and hills/mountains to discover.

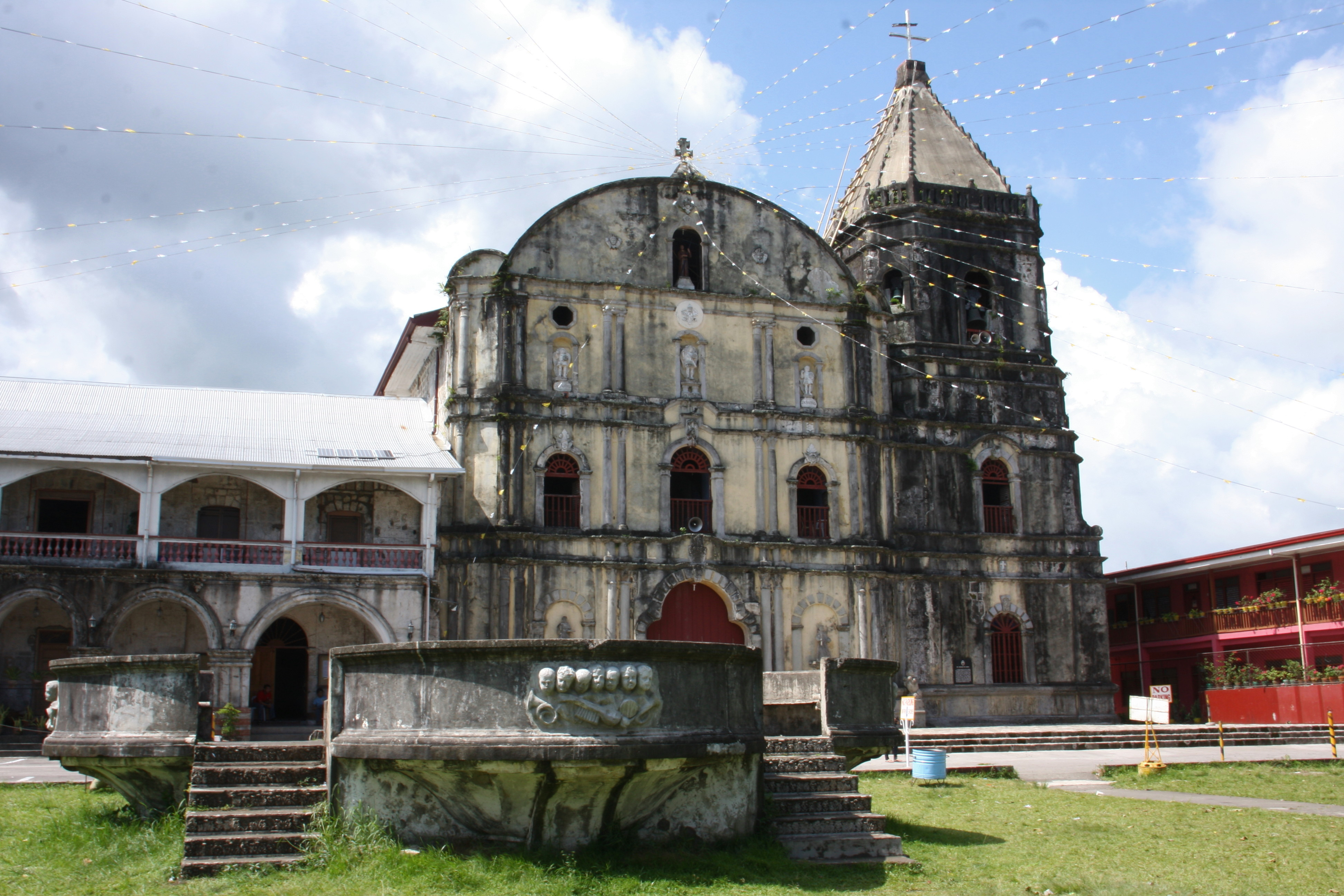
Minor Basilica of Saint Michael Archangel is considered one of the oldest and biggest church in the Philippines

Minor Basilica of St. Michael the Archangel
The Minor Basilica of St. Michael the Archangel is a Roman Catholic basilica located in Tayabas, Quezon. It is the largest Catholic church in the Province of Quezon. It is renowned for having the shape of a key. Locals often refer to the church as Susi ng Tayabas. On October 18, 1988, the title Minor Basilica was conferred by Pope John Paul II. It was proclaimed on January 21, 1989.

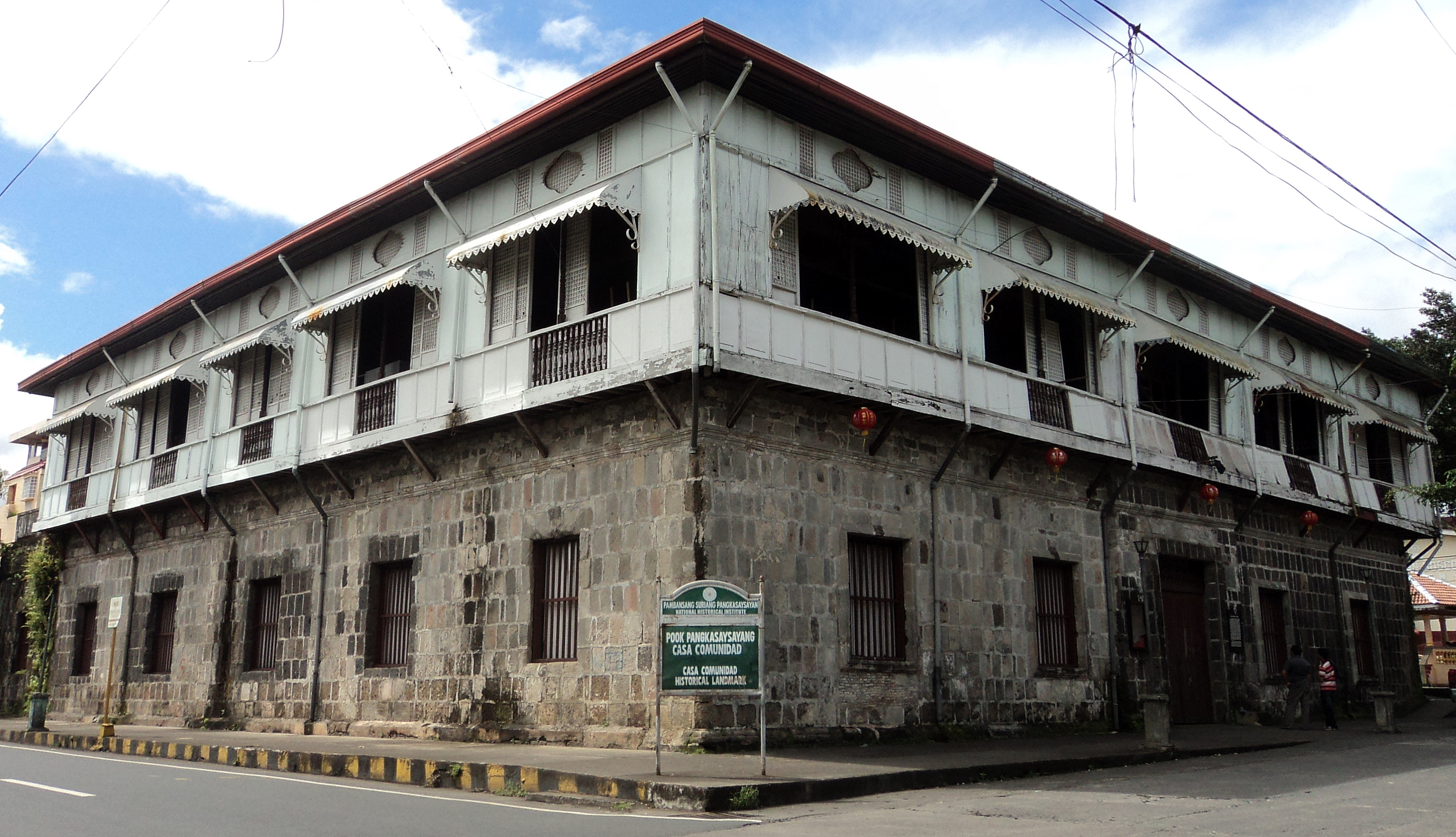
Casa Comunidad de Tayabas is the biggest "Bahay na Bato" ever restored by the National Historical Institute

Casa Comunidad de Tayabas
Constructed in 1831 when Don Diego Enriquez was gobernadorcillo, it is primarily designed as a guesthouse for visiting Spanish dignitaries. According to Buzeta and Brazo, Tayabas in 1851 had a Casa de Comunidad where the prison was located. The Tribunal seems to have been located in the Casa as well. In 1887, Juan Alvarez Guerra, a Spanish official, says that "beyond dispute, it is one of the best in the Philippines... It has spacious halls, magnificent decor, and ornate furniture". He adds that at one corner of the Tribunal was the telegraph station. Unfortunately, shortly after his book was written, a horrific fire consumed the building as well as others in the city. Alfred Marache locates the fire at around 1882–1883. During the American period, the reconstructed building became a public school. Thus from being the center of the local judicial system, it became the center of the community's intellectual life. It was destroyed once more in the bombing of 1945. In the 2000s, Casa de Comunidad was reconstructed by the National Historical Institute. Casa de Comunidad is a national historical landmark which houses the local museum and the municipal library. It is host to many cultural and historical activities. This century old building, is the place where Apolinario "Hermano Pule" Dela Cruz was tried and sentenced to death in 1841.

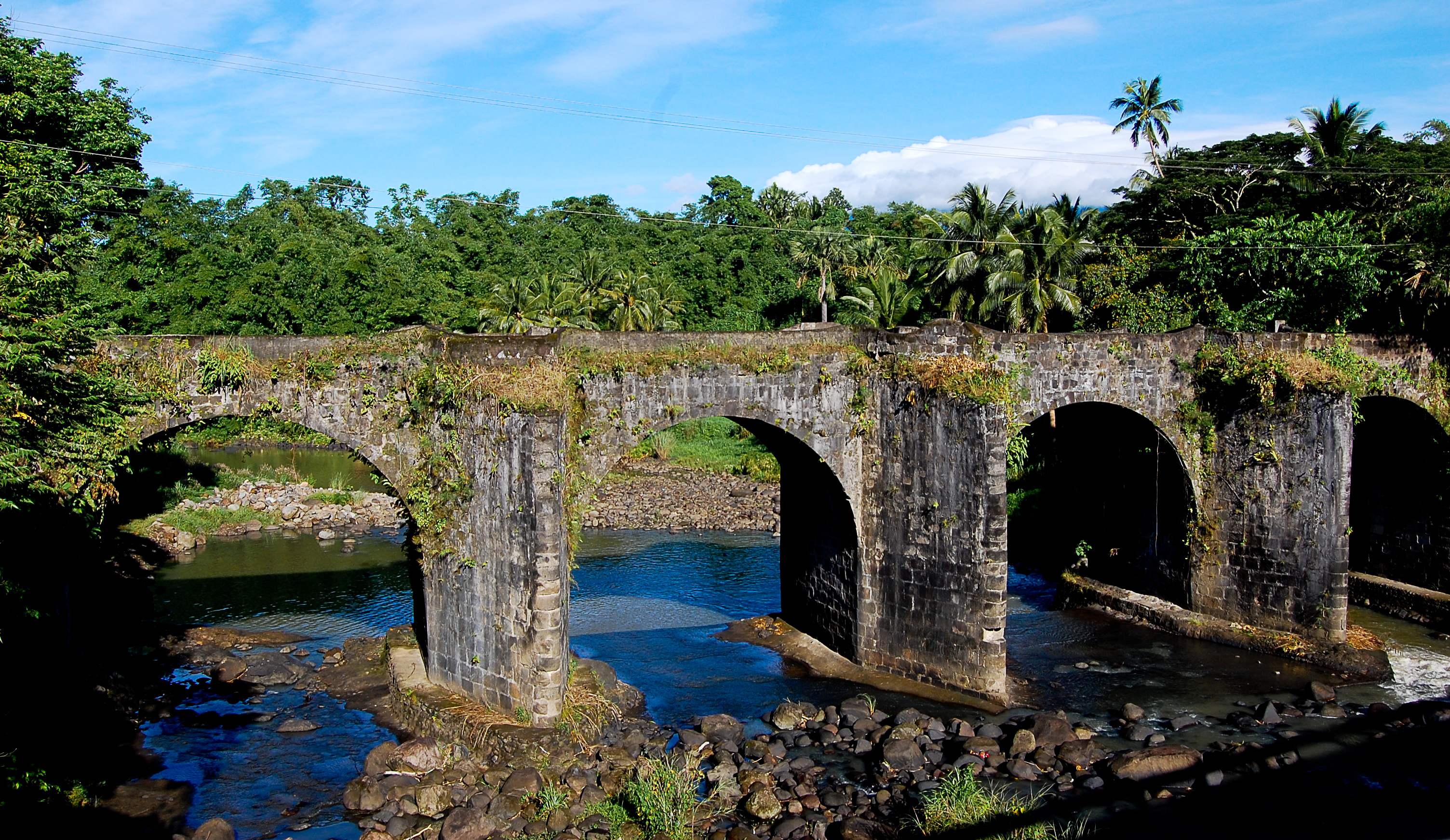
Malagonlong Bridge is considered as a National Cultural Treasure and other 10 bridges in Tayabas

Malagonlong Bridge
A declared historical site by the National Historical Institute and a potential candidate for UNESCO World Heritage, Malogonlong Bridge is one of the oldest and longest stone arched bridges found in province of Quezon. It is a 136-meter-long (446 ft) bridge built between 1840 and 1850 under the direction of the "Ministro del Pueblo," Fray Antonio Mattheos, a Franciscan priest. It was the longest bridge ever made during the Spanish colonial era with approximately 100,000 adobe blocks used.

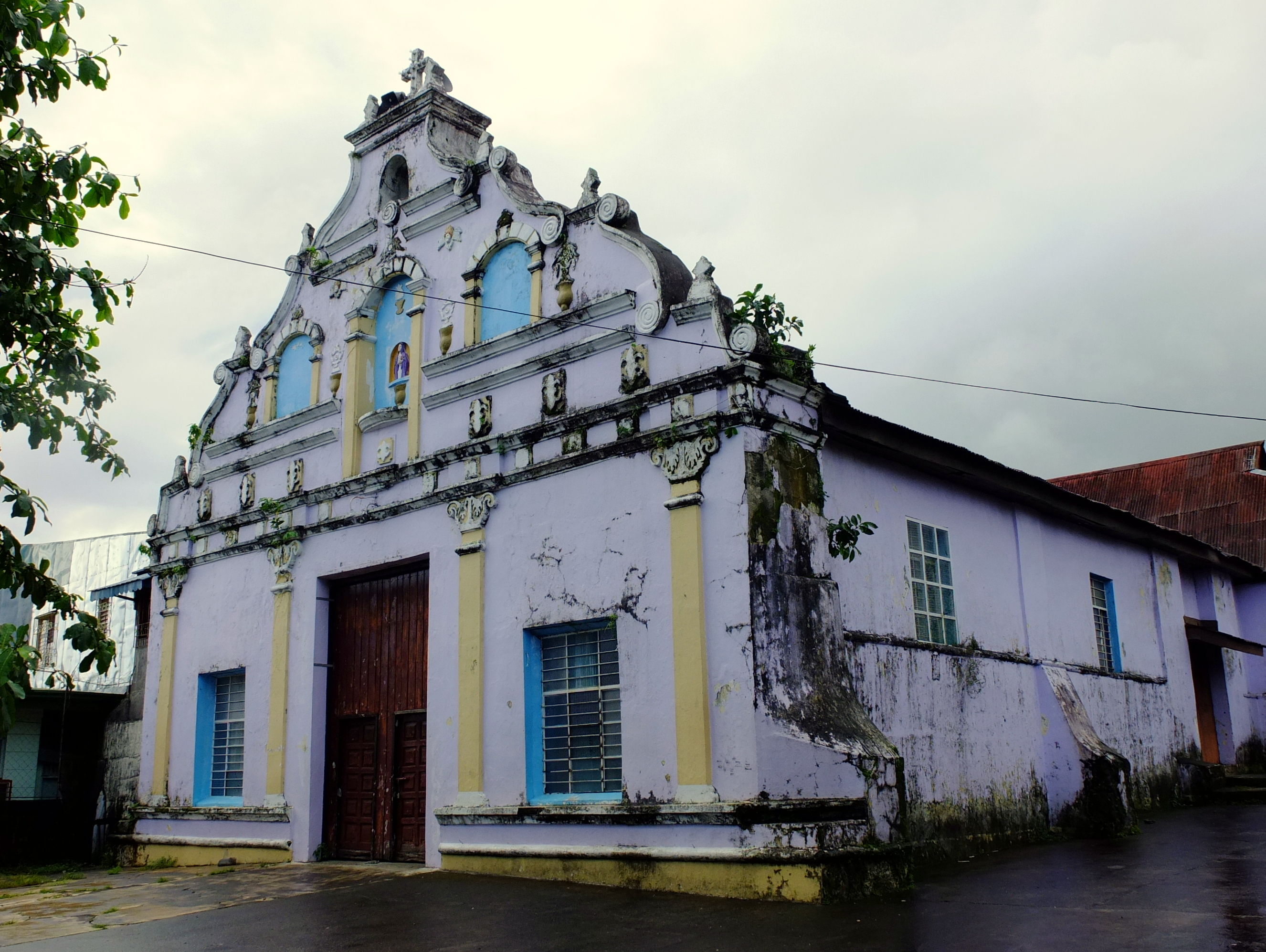
Nuestra Señora de las Angustias

Nuestra Señora de las Angustias
One of the oldest church in Tayabas. The chapel was built in 1838. In 1887, the chapel was described as having a small cloister, a modest presbytery and a sacristy to the right side of the presbytery. The walls had four windows of capiz and glass. In March 1945, the chapel was destroyed due to American bombings and only the walls remained. However, the walls served as a guide to its eventual restoration.

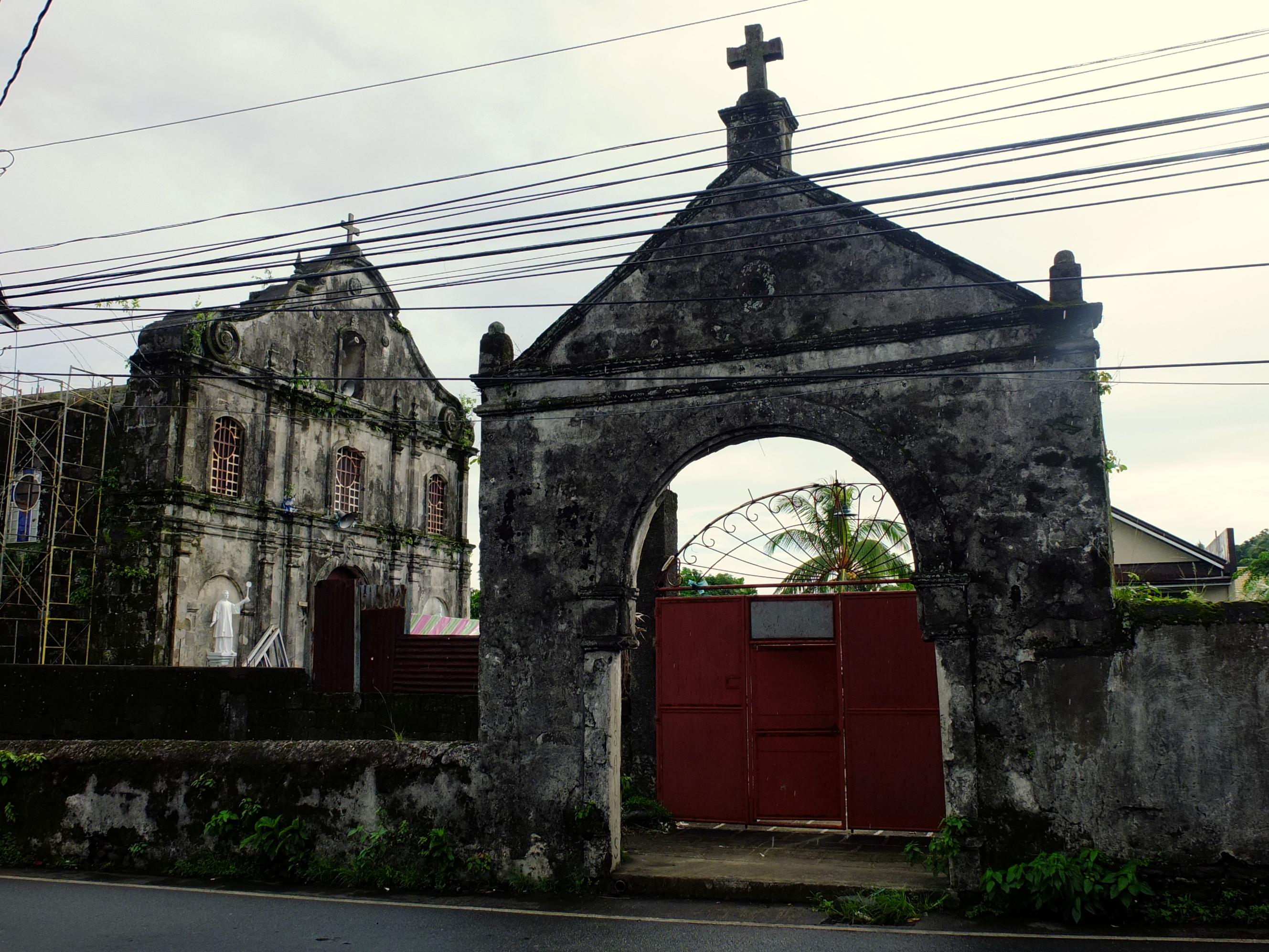
Santuario de las Almas

Sanctuario de las Almas
Built in 1855, the church was called "Cementerio de los Españoles" during the Spanish period. A former cemetery and now a place for devotees of San Diego de Alcala.

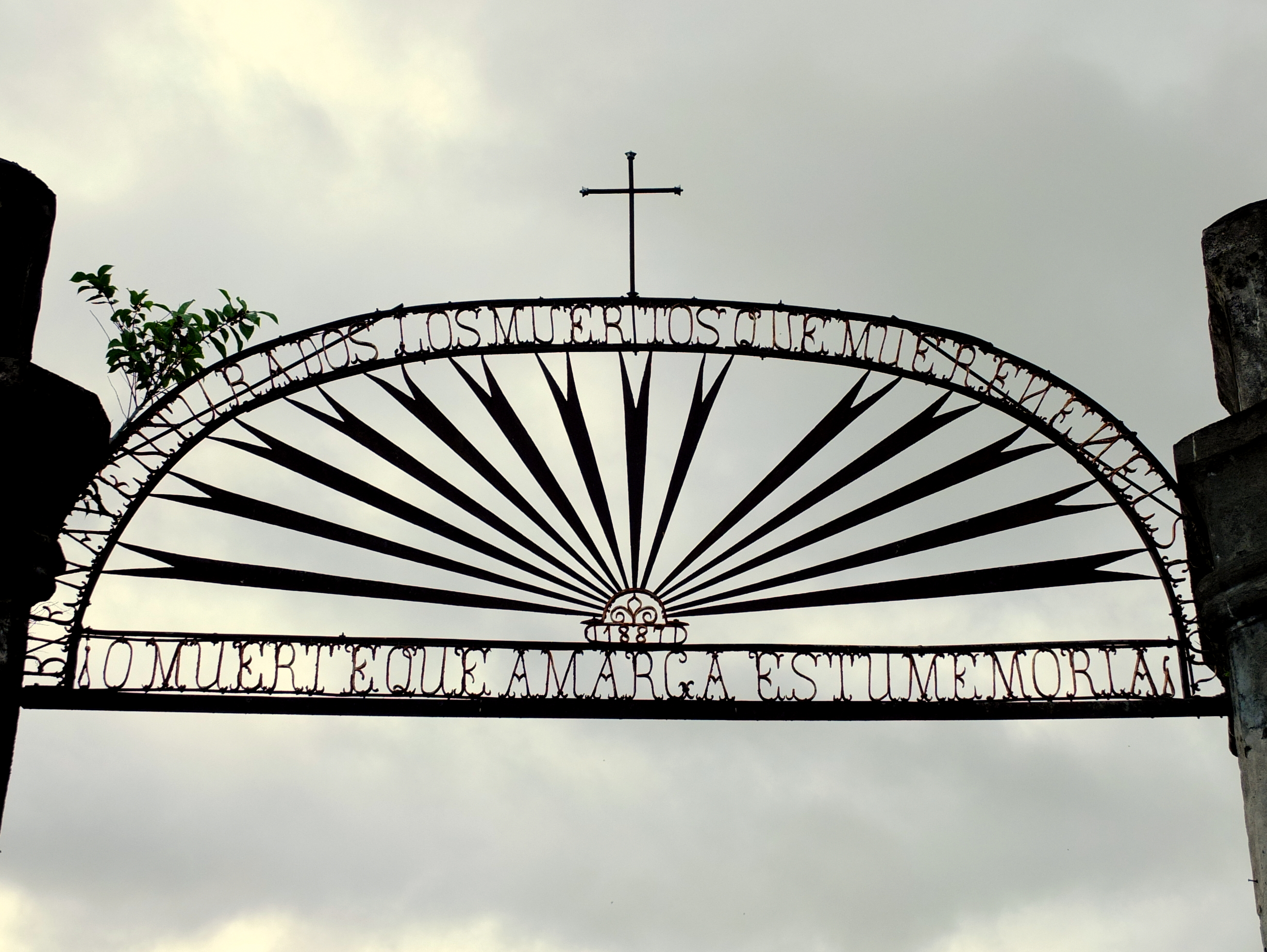
Camposanto de los Indios

Camposanto de los Indios
The cemetery was built in 1887. Today it is called "kamposanto". The cemetery has a gate composed of two stone column that carry a grill sign. The grills have two designs: 10 A rising sun symbolizing hope and thus a new life; 2) "O muerte, que amarga es tu memoria" (O Death, how bitter is your memory), and "Bienventurados los muertos que mueren en el Señor" (Blessed are the deceased who die in the Lord).

Calle Budin
Kalye Budin is actually a short portion of Emilio Jacinto Street, a few blocks away from the public market, where local and foreign tourists drop by just to grab freshly baked budins (sold at PHP 28/USD 0.64/IDR 5,714 per cake) and other delicacies the town and the province are known for. Nilupak (pound cassava cake), halayang ube (sweet purple yam/taro), ube candy, pastillas (milk candy), espasol (sticky rice snack) and tikoy (the local version of the Chinese sticky rice cake) can also be found there. Lucban longganisa (sausage), pansit Lucban (noodles), puto seko (rice cookies) and the potent but liked lambanog (coconut wine/vodka), uraro (arrowroot cookies from Catanauan) and apas (thin sweet cookies from Sariaya), as well as mazapan (another kind of milk candy), cassava chips, fish crackers and meringue are also sold.

== Culture ==
=== Festival ===
Mayohan sa Tayabas

Tayabas is also known for the annual Mayohan sa Tayabas (San Isidro Festival), celebrated every month of May. This is a harvest festival honoring San Isidro Labrador, the patron saint of farmers. The festival is a significant event for the people of Tayabas, as it showcases their rich cultural heritage, promotes tourism in the area, and pays homage to the local farmers who have been the lifeblood of Tayabas' economy for generations.

This festival usually opens at the beginning of the month with a Parada ng Baliskog. Baliskog, the local term for welcome arch, is usually made of indigenous materials such as coco leaf, coco husk, bamboo poles, buli, rattan, dried flowers, tistis and other decors such as local flowers, corn, and palay. The parade also includes tao-tao, a local term for scarecrows used by farmers on their farms. A Parada ng Tagay is also included in the welcoming parade to promote Lambanog, the proudest product of the town. This parade is participated by some members of different barangays and also by various organizations and barangay associations.

The main highlight of this festivity is the procession of the image of San Isidro Labrador, which is held every May 15. It passes through the town center, where houses are decorated with pabitin, kiping, crops, and other indigenous materials. Men accompanying the procession will participate in Hagisan ng Suman, in which massive amounts of suman will be thrown at the crowd. Suman is considered a ritual gift by the Tayabasin people. It is believed that it will bring prosperity and luck. An estimate of at least 12,000 pieces of suman are thrown every Mayohan Festival. The pabitin, which are tied with suman and other summer fruits like banana, pineapple, buko, and mango, will be emptied as soon as the image of San Isidro Labrador passes by.

== Transportation ==
Jeepneys and tricycles are common options when travelling to destinations within the downtown and the city.

To ease the traffic situation in Tayabas, the San Miguel Corporation will build a 66.74 km extension of South Luzon Expressway, also known as SLEX-TR4.

== Notable personalities. ==
- Bishop Alfredo Maria Obviar – first bishop of the Diocese of Lucena, founder of MCST, declared a Venerable
- Hermana Fausta Labrador – born in Tayabas/founder of Sacred Heart College (Lucena City). her father's surname was originally San Agustin until he changed it to Labrador in compliance with the decree of Governor General Narciso Claveria
- Paraluman (Sigrid Sophia Agatha von Giese y de Torres) – December 4, 1923 – April 27, 2009 – Award-winning actress active from the 1940s to the 1970s
- Tommy Abuel – a multi-awarded actor in the Philippines.
- Heidi Mendoza – former Under-Secretary-General of the United Nations Office of Internal Oversight Services (OIOS) from 2015 to 2019 and Commissioner of the Commission on Audit (COA) from 2011 to 2015.

== Sister cities ==
- Lucena, Philippines
- Makati, Philippines
- Palayan, Philippines

== See also ==
- List of Cultural Properties of Tayabas

Preceded by Unisan as Capital of Kalilayan	Capital of Tayabas; 1749–1901	Succeeded by Lucena
