= Known error =

Software bug with identified root cause but no fix

A known error is a software bug that has not been fixed, but has an identified root cause and either has low disruptive impact on end users or a known workaround.

In the ITIL framework for IT service management, the term has a specific meaning that distinguishes it from a problem. A problem is an underlying cause of one or more incidents whose root cause has not yet been determined. Once the root cause is identified, the problem is reclassified as a known error. The known error remains in that state until a permanent fix is implemented or the affected system is decommissioned.

Known errors may be recorded in a Known Error Database (KEDB), which documents the root cause, any available workarounds, and the status of fix efforts. In ITIL, the KEDB is maintained as part of the Problem Management process and is used to prioritise changes, speed up incident resolution, and provide support staff with reference information when a workaround exists.

Tested systems are sometimes described as "free from known errors" to acknowledge that complex systems cannot be proven entirely error-free, but that all identified bugs have been either fixed or documented.

== See also ==
- ITIL
- Software bug
- Workaround
- Root cause analysis
- IT service management
