= DXSI =

Philippine radio station

Radyo Natin Mati (DXSI)
Mati; Philippines
- Broadcast area: Southern Davao Oriental
- Frequency: 105.3 MHz
- Branding: Radyo Natin 105.3

Programming
- Languages: Cebuano, Filipino
- Format: Community radio
- Network: Radyo Natin Network

Ownership
- Owner: MBC Media Group

History
- First air date: 1997

Technical information
- Licensing authority: NTC
- Power: 1,000 watts

DXSI (105.3 FM), broadcasting as Radyo Natin 105.3, is a radio station owned and operated by MBC Media Group. The studio is located in Martinez Subd., Mati, Davao Oriental.
