= WOWC =

- Morrison, Tennessee; United States
- Broadcast area: McMinnville-Manchester
- Frequency: 105.3 MHz
- Branding: WOW Country

Programming
- Format: Country
- Affiliations: Fox News Radio; Westwood One

Ownership
- Owner: Peg Broadcasting

History
- Former call signs: WSMT-FM (1979–2000); WRKK-FM (2000–2008)

Technical information
- Licensing authority: FCC
- Facility ID: 3337
- Class: A
- ERP: 6,000 watts
- HAAT: 74 meters (243 feet)
- Transmitter coordinates: 35°37′27.00″N 85°53′37.00″W

Links
- Public license information: Public file; LMS
- Website: Official website

WOWC (105.3 FM, "WOW Country") is a radio station licensed to serve Morrison, Tennessee. The station is owned by Peg Broadcasting, LLC. It airs a country music format.

The station was assigned the WOWC call letters by the Federal Communications Commission on June 30, 2008.

== Ownership ==
In March 2008, Peg Broadcasting Crossville LLC (Jeffrey Shaw, president) reached an agreement to purchase WRKK-FM from Clear Channel (John Hogan, CEO/radio) as part of a six station package. The terms of the deal were undisclosed.

== Station history ==
From 2000 to 2008, the station was granted the call letters WRKK-FM, selected to better match the rock music format. Until the June 2008 format flip to country music and call letter change to WOWC, WRKK-FM was branded on air as "The Rock Dog".

"The Rock Dog" logo
