= WVBH-LP =

- Benton Harbor, Michigan; United States
- Frequency: 105.3 MHz

Programming
- Format: Urban Contemporary

Ownership
- Owner: Flats Economic Development Corp.

Technical information
- Licensing authority: FCC
- Facility ID: 126875
- Class: L1
- ERP: 100 watts
- HAAT: 19.4 meters (64 ft)
- Transmitter coordinates: 42°06′32.8″N 86°26′30.1″W

Links
- Public license information: LMS

WVBH-LP (105.3 FM) is a radio station licensed to Benton Harbor, Michigan, United States. The station is currently owned by Flats Economic Development Corp.
