= KGDM-LP =

Radio station in Merced, California

- Merced, California; United States
- Frequency: 105.3 MHz
- Branding: Kingdom Radio

Programming
- Format: Contemporary Christian

Ownership
- Owner: Calvary Chapel of Merced

History
- Former frequencies: 105.5 FM (2005–2012)

Technical information
- Licensing authority: FCC
- Facility ID: 124864
- Class: L1
- ERP: 100 watts
- HAAT: 6 meters (20 ft)
- Transmitter coordinates: 37°19′09″N 120°27′15″W

Links
- Public license information: LMS
- Website: calvarychapelmerced.org/info.htm

KGDM-LP (105.3 FM) is a radio station broadcasting a contemporary Christian radio format. Licensed to Merced, California, United States, the station is currently owned by Calvary Chapel of Merced.

Historically, KGDM was an AM broadcast station in Stockton, CA, operating on 1140 kHz with a power of 5 kW. It was a CBS network affiliate. The station was relocated to Sacramento in the late 1950s; callsign was changed to KRAK, and power increased to 50 KW. (cf White's Radio Log, various editions).
