= KJDL-FM =

Radio station in Levelland, Texas

Coordinates: 33.423°N 102.129°W

- Levelland, Texas; United States
- Broadcast area: Lubbock, Texas
- Frequency: 105.3 MHz

Programming
- Format: Spanish Christian

Ownership
- Owner: Enrique Garza; (Christian Ministries of the Valley, Inc.)

History
- First air date: 1979 (as KHOC at 105.5)
- Former call signs: KHOC (1979–1991); KLVT (1991–2007)
- Former frequencies: 105.5 MHz (1979–2008)

Technical information
- Licensing authority: FCC
- Facility ID: 30027
- Class: C2
- ERP: 23,500 watts
- HAAT: 217 meters (712 ft)

Links
- Public license information: Public file; LMS

KJDL-FM (105.3 FM) is a radio station broadcasting a Spanish Christian format. Licensed to Levelland, Texas, United States, the station serves the Lubbock area. The station is currently owned by Enrique Garza’s Christian Ministries of the Valley, Inc. and features an all Spanish Christian content.

== History ==
The station went on the air as KLVT-FM on March 8, 1991. On July 24, 2007, the station changed its call sign to the current KJDL-FM.

Delbert L. Kirby had been an announcer and newscaster in Lubbock, Big Spring and Levelland for many years. Kirby was working at KLVT (AM) when he decided to file an application for an empty FM channel (288A or 105.5 MHz) in Levelland. Kirby was KLVT news director when the application showed up in Broadcasting magazine. The KLVT manager saw this and fired Kirby. Kirby sold merchandise door to door while he worked on his application. He'd obtained an SBA backed loan and contacted Charles "Charlie" Wilson to install the station equipment.

Original airdate was in fall of 1979. Call letters were KHOC for Hockley County. Studios and tower were on 13th street between avenue Q and avenue S in southwest Levelland. Power was 3,000 watts at a height of 300 feet (91 m) above average terrain.

Original equipment was provided by Don Jones of Amarillo, Texas as representative of McMartin Industries.

The station sold to Walker Broadcasting in 2007. The format was originally syndicated variety "Jack-FM" and was changed to a Country format in January 2009. In November 2009, longtime country DJ Neely Yates joined the on-air staff. In the following months, the station's format shifted to a "Texas Country" playlist, playing all Texas Country Music and rebranding as The Red Dirt Rebel 105.3.

On June 25, 2019, Enrique Garza’s Christian Ministries of the Valley closed a $312,500 deal to buy KJDL-FM from Walker Broadcasting. The sales price included a $100,000 promissory note.

== Former on-air staff ==
- David Wilde
- Neely Yates
- Jess Walker
- Jamie Lassiter
- Tommy Turner
- Quayde Addison

== Previous logo ==
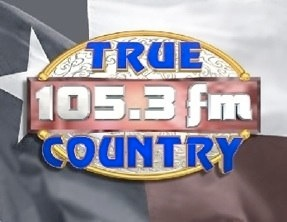
(KJDL-FM's logo under previous "True Country" branding)
