= KIHC-FM =

- Chariton, Iowa; United States
- Broadcast area: Central Iowa
- Frequency: 105.3 MHz
- Branding: Iowa Catholic Radio

Programming
- Format: Catholic

Ownership
- Owner: St. Gabriel Communications

History
- Former call signs: KYRS (1979–1986); KELR-FM (1986–2009); KEDB (2009–2023)

Technical information
- Licensing authority: FCC
- Facility ID: 17776
- Class: C2
- ERP: 34,000 watts
- HAAT: 182 m (597 ft)
- Transmitter coordinates: 40°53′23″N 93°01′30″W

Links
- Public license information: Public file; LMS
- Webcast: Listen live
- Website: iowacatholicradio.com

KIHC-FM (105.3 MHz) is a commercial radio station licensed to Chariton, Iowa.

It has been sold by Honey Creek Broadcasting LLC to St. Gabriel Communications, parent company of Iowa Catholic Radio, and is operating as a non-commercial radio station after the sale's completion.

On September 1, 2023, KEDB changed its format from oldies to Catholic religious, branded as "Iowa Catholic Radio", upon the consummation of the sale of the station. On September 13, 2023, the station changed its call sign to KIHC-FM.

== Previous logo ==
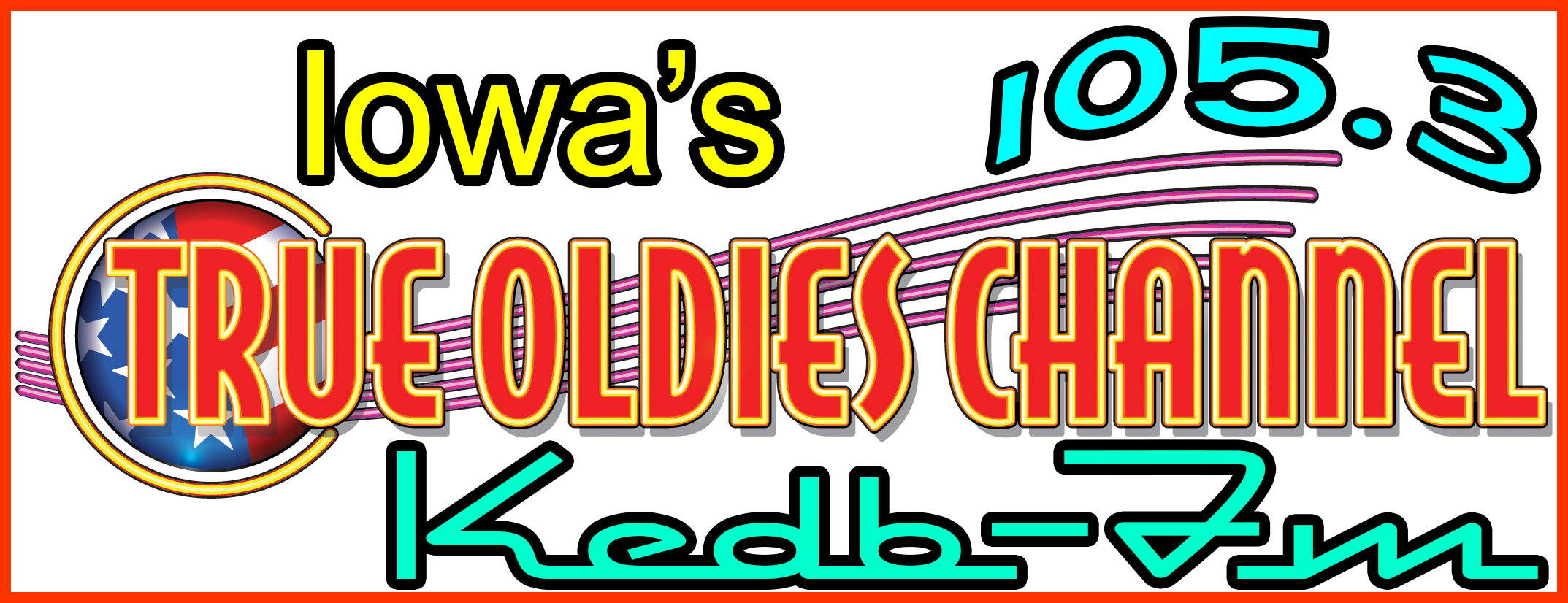
