= KLLL-FM =

Radio station in Lubbock, Texas

Lubbock, Texas; United States
- Broadcast area: Lubbock metropolitan area
- Frequency: 96.3 MHz
- Branding: 96.3 K Triple-L

Programming
- Format: Country
- Affiliations: Westwood One

Ownership
- Owner: Connoisseur Media; (Alpha Media Licensee LLC)
- Sister stations: KBTE; KMMX; KONE

History
- First air date: 1958
- Former call signs: KBFM (1958–1970)

Technical information
- Licensing authority: FCC
- Class: C1
- ERP: 100,000 watts
- HAAT: 249 meters (817 ft)

Links
- Public license information: Public file; LMS
- Webcast: Listen live
- Website: www.klll.com

KLLL-FM (96.3 MHz) is a country music station licensed and broadcast in Lubbock, Texas, owned by Connoisseur Media through licensee Alpha Media Licensee LLC. Its studios are located in south Lubbock on Avenue Q west of Interstate 27, and its transmitter is located separately two miles away south of the studios.

== History ==
KBFM, the forerunner to KLLL-FM, began in 1958 as an easy listening station. It transmitted an SCA (Subsidiary Communications Authority) to transmit Muzak brand background music. The transmitter was located at the Great Plains Life Building (now known as Metro Tower) at Broadway and avenue M. Studios were originally at 2442 14th street, but were shortly moved to the fifth floor of the same building as the transmitter and antenna. The station was founded by a Mr. Blankenship. KLLL (1460 AM) was in the same building with its studios on the top (20th) floor. During this time country legend and outlaw Waylon Jennings was a disc jockey and it was not uncommon for his good friend and Rock and Roll pioneer Buddy Holly would hang out together at the studios. KLLL still has jingles sung by Buddy Holly in its archives along with former airchecks of Waylon Jennings live on KLLL.

In 1968, KLLL's owners, the Corbins, bought KBFM in order to add an FM frequency to KLLL (most all stations at the time were AM as FM had not become popular yet). It kept its call letters, stayed easy listening by day but carried the country format of KLLL at night when the 1460 AM daytimer signed off.

KBFM changed to KLLL-FM on November 1, 1970, a few months after the 1970 Lubbock tornado. The studio building was damaged and the station relocated to the former KSEL studios on East Broadway; KSEL had moved to 84th and L where at the site of the new channel 28 KSEL-TV (now KAMC). KLLL moved to 50th and L in 1976.

The Corbin family hired Jerry "Bo" Coleman as a radio host and made him a stockholder. In 1978, the Corbins sold KLLL and KLLL-FM to Lubbock County Broadcasting, owned by James Thrash and John Frankhouser.

By 1980, FM had become the format of choice and 5 FM stations rose to dominate the Lubbock market: KTEZ 101.1, KSEL-FM 93.7, KFMX-FM 94.5, KRLB 99.5, and KLLL-FM 96.3.

By 1981, under the programming leadership of Jon Steele, the emergence of George Strait and the Urban Cowboy era saw KLLL rise to number one in the market. Johnny Walker was the morning personality and featured a very talented lineup that included Jon Steele, Chuck Luck and more.

Thrash and Frankhouser sold the company in 1987 to Pinnacle Broadcasting and was managed by Buddy Howell. Jon Steele became general manager, a position he held along with being the anchor of the morning show until his departure in 2005.

KLLL is one of the biggest brands in country radio nationally and often one of the most innovative and ground breaking stations in the format. In 1989 it was a finalist for Country Music Association radio station of the year. Jon, Don(Vanlandingham) and Jane(Prince Jones) started broadcasting as its morning team in 1987 and by the fall of 1989 had become Lubbock's top ranked morning team on Lubbock's #1 radio station supplanting legendary FM 99.

In 1988, longtime radio/TV weather personality Rick Gilbert joined the station as midday personality and later program director. Afternoon drive personality Jeff Scott also joined the programming team as music director and was responsible for breaking artists like Clint Black and Garth Brooks.

By 1990, KLLL had locked up 32% of the listening audience in Lubbock and was known for breaking the biggest new stars that became the nucleus of the dominant 1990's in country music. From 1993 to 1995, Jay Richards was honored as the Radio Ink Program Director of the year.

In 1999, KLLL sold to NextMedia Group along with stations in Myrtle Beach, South Carolina, and Greenville–New Bern, North Carolina. KLLL has continued to dominate the country position in Lubbock and the region.

Jeff Wilks, CEO of Wilks Broadcasting purchased KLLL and its sister stations KMMX, KONE, and KBTE in 2005 starting what would be the next and most significant chapter in the dynastical success the station group would enjoy. The cluster under the direction of market manager Jay Richardson along with operations manager Jeff Scott made the Lubbock stations the most profitable and most listened to group of radio stations in Lubbock radio history. This run would last for the next decade.

KLLL's morning team featuring Jeff Scott and Mudflap are the longest running morning team in KLLL history, having been together starting in 2005 and have continued to be Lubbock's top local morning show over this period of time.

Jeff Wilks would sell the Lubbock stations to Alpha Media in 2015. Alpha Media merged with Connoisseur Media on September 4, 2025.
