= KXTQ =

KXTQ may refer to:

- KXTQ-FM, a radio station (107.7 FM) licensed to serve Idalou, Texas, United States
- KXTQ-CD, a television station (channel 24, virtual 46) licensed to serve Lubbock, Texas
- KLBB-FM, a radio station (93.7 FM) licensed to serve Lubbock, Texas, which held the call sign KXTQ-FM from 1993 to 2015
