= KLBB =

KLBB may refer to Lubbock Preston Smith International Airport (ICAO code KLBB).

KLBB may also refer to a number of different radio stations in the United States

- KLBB (AM), a defunct radio station (1220 AM) formerly licensed to serve Stillwater, Minnesota
- KLBB-FM, a radio station (93.7 FM) licensed to serve Lubbock, Texas
- KLBB-LD, a low-power television station (channel 19, virtual 48) licensed to serve Lubbock, Texas
- KMNV, formerly KLBB, a radio station (1400 AM) licensed to serve the Minneapolis-St. Paul area of Minnesota
- KXTQ-FM, formerly KLBB-FM, a radio station (107.7 FM) licensed to serve Idalou, Texas
