= KMMX =

Radio station in Tahoka, Texas

Coordinates: 33.442°N 101.878°W

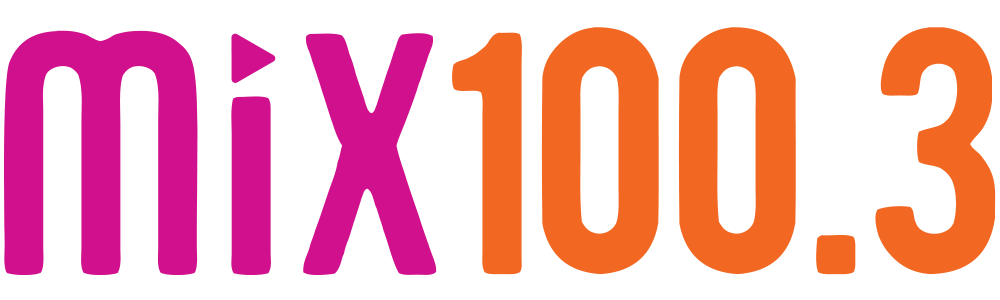
- Tahoka, Texas; United States
- Broadcast area: Lubbock metropolitan area
- Frequency: 100.3 MHz
- Branding: Mix 100.3

Programming
- Format: Top 40 (CHR)
- Affiliations: Premiere Networks; United Stations Radio Networks; Westwood One

Ownership
- Owner: Connoisseur Media; (Alpha Media Licensee LLC)
- Sister stations: KBTE; KLLL-FM; KONE

History
- First air date: 1996
- Call sign meaning: "Mix"

Technical information
- Licensing authority: FCC
- Facility ID: 86
- Class: C1
- ERP: 100,000 watts
- HAAT: 269 meters (883 ft)

Links
- Public license information: Public file; LMS
- Webcast: Listen live
- Website: www.mix100lubbock.com

KMMX (100.3 FM), is a commercial radio station licensed to Tahoka, Texas, serving Greater Lubbock and airs a top 40 (CHR) radio station. The station brands as “Mix 100.3.” Its studios are located in south Lubbock on Avenue Q west of I-27, and its transmitter is located south of the city.

== History ==
KMMX-FM originally signed on as "Mix 104.7" as a soft adult contemporary station. However, the station suffered from weak signal penetration into the Lubbock market. In the 1990s, a frequency swap with another market allowed KMMX to occupy the 100.3 frequency. By May 1997, the station became more of a contemporary hit radio-leaning hot adult contemporary format with live air personalities, using the slogan "A 50/50 Mix Of The 80s & 90s". This was a response to the loss of KRLB 99.5 "The Music Station", which, as a result of the sale of contemporary hit radio station KZII-FM to KRLB's parent company, changed formats from hot adult contemporary to classic rock.

In 1998, KMMX dropped the ".3" from their name to a simplified "Mix 100 - Your Music Fix". In 1999, the station again changed slogans to "The Best Mix Of The 80s, 90s, & Today".

Briefly in 2003, the station used the slogan "Lubbock's New Number One Hit Music Station". For much of the 2000s, Mix 100 was "Lubbock's Pop-Rock", a hybrid adult top-40/hot AC station. Mix 100 shifted formats to mainstream CHR in 2010, rebranding as "Lubbock’s Hit Music Station". In 2015, the station resumed using its full frequency in its name as "Mix 100.3".

== Programming ==
Mix 100 became the first radio station in Lubbock to carry the syndicated morning show The Kidd Kraddick Morning Show in June 2001.

== In fiction ==
KMMX was the call sign on the side of a car driven by the camera operator of a fictional television news channel 8 station in the episode "On Camera" of Emergency!.
