= KTTU =

KTTU may refer to:

- KTTU (AM), a radio station (950 AM) licensed to serve Lubbock, Texas, United States
- KTTU-FM, a radio station (97.3 FM) licensed to serve New Deal, Texas, United States
- KTTU-TV, a television station (channel 18) licensed to serve Tucson, Arizona, United States
- KATN, a television station (channel 2) licensed to serve Fairbanks, Alaska, United States, which held the call sign KTTU-TV from 1981 to 1984
