= KFMX-FM =

- Lubbock, Texas; United States
- Broadcast area: Lubbock, Texas
- Frequency: 94.5 MHz
- Branding: FMX 94.5

Programming
- Format: Mainstream rock
- Affiliations: Compass Media Networks; United Stations Radio Networks

Ownership
- Owner: Townsquare Media; (Townsquare License, LLC)
- Sister stations: KFYO, KKAM, KKCL-FM, KQBR, KZII-FM

History
- First air date: 1966 (as KLBK-FM)
- Former call signs: KLBK-FM (1966–1981)

Technical information
- Licensing authority: FCC
- Facility ID: 60799
- Class: C1
- ERP: 100,000 watts
- HAAT: 249 meters (817 ft)
- Transmitter coordinates: 33°31′5″N 101°51′25″W

Links
- Public license information: Public file; LMS
- Webcast: Listen Live
- Website: kfmx.com

KFMX-FM (94.5 MHz) is a radio station broadcasting a mainstream rock format. Licensed to Lubbock, Texas, United States. The station is currently owned by Townsquare Media. Its studios and transmitter are located in south Lubbock.

== History ==
The station signed on as KLBK-FM in August 1966 with 100,000 watts. It was founded by Grayson Enterprises, Inc. as an automated station. The KLBK (AM) announcers recorded announcements for the FM stations, and oversaw the tape players, and the KLBK-TV engineers watched the transmitter and maintained its operation.

In 1970 the station added a small console and two turntables in a room used as an on the air studio. The format remained as general music, but added a live program each evening with "Music by Misty" hosted by Moda Fincher a.k.a. Misty. In 1976 Chuck Spaugh left KSEL AM-FM and became general manager at KLBK-AM-FM. He changed formats to popular music, simulcasting some parts of KLBK (AM)'s day schedule, using the live studio equipment in the evenings, and the automation overnights.

In 1980 the station was sold to Southern Minnesota Broadcasting Company and the AM callsign changed to KSAX, though the FM stayed as KLBK-FM. The studios were moved to 5613 Villa Drive and the FM letters changed to KFMX. The station then moved to the 82nd & Quaker studios as part of Gulfstar Communications (later AMFM, Inc, then Clear Channel Communications, then Gap Broadcasting, and currently Townsquare Media.)

The KFMX call letters had also been used in Minneapolis, Seattle, San Diego, Omaha, and probably other markets. It has been on in Lubbock since January 18, 1981.

The format changed to album-oriented rock consulted by Burkhart-Abrams-Michaels-Douglas. The sign -on program director was Bo Jagger (a.k.a. Ira Madsen) who had worked at 92-K in Dallas and KPAS in El Paso. Jagger brought several air talents to town so that "FMX" had a bigger time sound than any previous Lubbock radio operation. Memos would task announcers with "interpret events, do not announce them" and "the magic of 'FMX is in the minds of those who operate her".

Over the years, the station has branded itself as "94.5 KFMX-FM, The Home of Rock-N-Roll"; "Pure Rock, 94.5 FMX", "Absolute Rock, 94.5 FMX" and its current "Lubbock's Rock Station". The broadcast booth itself has often been referred to as "Voodoo Central", a name created by Mike Driver and adopted by the rest of the staff. FMX also served as the flagship radio station for Texas Tech Red Raiders football from 1994 to 2008.

Mornings are currently hosted by "The RockShow" (Wes Nessman & Chrissy Covington). The RockShow has also been syndicated to Abilene, Texas, and Wichita Falls, Texas. The pair received immediate attention after developing a weekly stunt segment called, "Torture Tuesdays" that involved the announcers being beaten like pinatas and other painful and/or violent stunts. Previous hosts include The Heathen and Kelly Plasker.

Notable broadcasters have worked at the station. Wes Nessman has been at the station on and off since the early-1980s; continuously since the mid-1990s. Dale Dudley and Loris Lowe worked at the station in the 1980s before moving to Austin where they work for KLBJ-FM and KGSR. Bobby Trebor and The Rockdog Beaver handled midays, afternoons and mornings at Fmx in the mid to late-80s. Brian King worked at the station in the 1970s under previous call letters KLBK. King is now a station owner (KEXX in Llano, Texas, among others). David Stewart hosted a talk show on KFMX, and served as chief engineer in the 1980s. He spent many years at Tichenor Media/Hispanic Broadcasting Corporation before starting Moving Target Consulting Works. He is a partner in stations KPET, KWFB and KXXN). Mike Driver hosted the afternoon show on FMX for 25 years, ending on July 1, 2018.

KFMX-FM transmits from an antenna shared with KLLL-FM, on a tower also used by KQBR, KZII-FM, KAIQ, KKCL-FM and KFYO's 95.1 FM facility. The Lubbock Tower was built by a consortium of stations (KFMX, KLLL, KQBR and KZII) in 1985.
