= KFYO =

KFYO may refer to:

- KFYO (AM), a radio station (790 AM/95.1 FM) licensed to Lubbock, Texas, United States
- KZII-FM, a radio station (102.5 FM) licensed to Lubbock, Texas, United States, which used the call sign KFYO-FM from February 1985 to March 1986
- KTTZ-TV, a television station (channel 5 analog/39 digital) licensed to Lubbock, Texas, United States, which formerly used the call sign KFYO-TV
