= KRBL =

- Idalou, Texas; United States
- Broadcast area: Lubbock, Texas
- Frequency: 107.7 MHz (HD Radio)
- Branding: The Red Dirt Rebel

Programming
- Language: English
- Format: Texas country
- Subchannels: HD2: Classic country; HD3: Country; HD4: Classic country (KSSL)

Ownership
- Owner: Ramar Communications, Inc.
- Sister stations: KLBB-FM; KTTU-AM; KTTU-FM; KXTQ-FM

History
- First air date: September 18, 1995
- Call sign meaning: Rebel

Technical information
- Licensing authority: FCC
- Facility ID: 88795
- Class: C3
- ERP: 6,000 watts
- HAAT: 207 meters (679 ft)
- Transmitter coordinates: 33°30′8.3″N 101°52′21.6″W
- Translators: HD2: 96.9 K245BG (Lubbock); HD3: 93.1 K226CH (Lubbock)

Links
- Public license information: Public file; LMS
- Webcast: Listen live; HD2: Listen live; HD3: Listen live; HD4: Listen live
- Website: thereddirtrebel.com; HD2: lubbocks969thebull.com; HD3: youngcountry931.com; HD4: ksslfm.com

KRBL (107.7 MHz, "The Red Dirt Rebel") is a radio station broadcasting a Texas country format. Licensed to Idalou, Texas, United States, it serves the Lubbock area. In September 2023, Ramar Communications agreed to purchase the station for $425,000, and on July 1, 2024, the station moved to 107.7 previously occupied by KLZK-FM.

Following court receivership in 2012, the station concluded its run as Praise Radio 105.7 on March 6, 2013, at 6PM. It was flipped immediately, stunting with an all Beatles format. One week later it re-launched as 105.7 The Edge. The first commercial alternative rock station in the Lubbock market.

The Free Beer and Hot Wings Show served as the morning show during The Edge format, with the rest of the programming done locally.

On November 1, 2013, KRBL announced on their Facebook page that they had been approved to boost their ERP to 25,000 watts, greatly expanding their coverage area.

On February 27, 2015, KRBL changed their format from alternative rock (which moved to KJDL 1420 AM) to classic hits, branded as "105.7 King FM". Landon King joined KRBL to serve as Brand Manager & Morning Show Host for King FM. King was previously with KKCL-FM in the Lubbock market for 18 years, leaving in November 2014. Dan Collins, a former morning show host at KKCL-FM (2002–2008), then became the afternoon DJ on King FM. King FM aired The Mike Harvey Show six nights a week and Shallowater High School football games.

On May 25, 2018, KRBL-FM itself began simulcasting on what had been sister Classic Hits “105.7 King-FM” KRBL Idalou and rebranded as “105.7 The Red-Dirt Rebel” on May 25, 2018.

Former logo

On July 1, 2024, the Red Dirt Rebel format moved from 105.7 to 107.7 FM. Lubbock Public Media then began broadcasting Classical 105.7 on KLZK-FM the same day.

In February 2025, David Wilde left the Red Dirt Rebel. In July 2025, Roberta Roberts left the Red Dirt Rebel; JR remains the host of the Red Dirt Rebel Morning Show.

== Previous logo ==
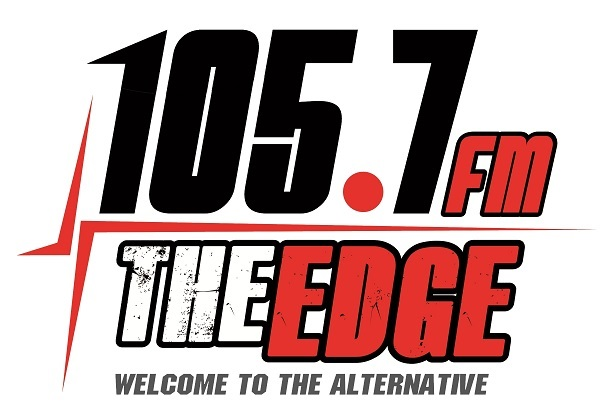
