= KKAM =

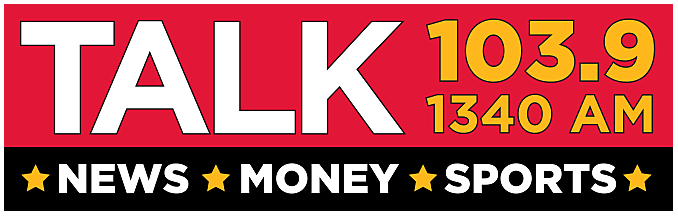
- Lubbock, Texas; United States
- Broadcast area: Lubbock metropolitan area
- Frequency: 1340 kHz
- Branding: Talk 103.9 and 1340

Programming
- Format: Silent (Previous format: News/talk/sports )
- Affiliations: CBS News Radio; Fox News Radio; Compass Media Networks; Salem Radio Network; Texas State Network; VSiN Radio; Westwood One; Houston Texans; Kansas City Chiefs

Ownership
- Owner: Townsquare Media; (Townsquare License, LLC)
- Sister stations: KFMX-FM, KFYO, KKCL-FM, KQBR, KZII-FM

History
- First air date: 1953
- Former call signs: KDUB (1953–1962); KLBK (1962–1980); KSAX (1980); KKAM (1980–1984); KBBL (1984); KFMX (1984–1988); KMKM (1988); KFMX (1988–1993)

Technical information
- Licensing authority: FCC
- Facility ID: 60798
- Class: C
- Power: 1,000 watts unlimited
- Transmitter coordinates: 33°33′24″N 101°51′46″W
- Translator: 103.9 K280GU (Lubbock)

Links
- Public license information: Public file; LMS
- Webcast: Listen Live
- Website: kkam.com

KKAM (1340 AM), branded as "Talk 103.9 and 1340", was a radio station broadcasting a news/talk/sports format. Licensed to Lubbock, Texas, United States. The station's license is currently owned by Townsquare Media. Its studios were located in south Lubbock, and its transmitter site was in Klapp Park southwest of downtown. KKAM was an active radio station from 1953-2026.

== History ==
KKAM signed on in second-half of 1953 as a Class IV AM station with the call letters KDUB, co-owned with Lubbock television station KDUB-TV (channel 13, now KLBK-TV). KFYO originally occupied the 1340 frequency in Lubbock, but moved to 790 AM in January 1953. The call sign was changed to KLBK on June 1, 1962; to KSAX on May 14, 1980; to KKAM on December 6, 1980; to KBBL and then KFMX in 1984; to KMKM and then back to KFMX in November 1988, and back to KKAM on April 1, 1993.

KKAM became Lubbock's first all-sports radio station in November 1996, segueing from a news/talk/sports/ag news format. The station was branded "SportsRadio 1340 KKAM". At the time of its format switch it was one of the first four all-sports radio stations in Texas; joining KTCK in Dallas, KILT in Houston and KTKR in San Antonio. Personalities that have worked at KKAM throughout its history include Ryan Hyatt, Mark Finkner, Jack Dale, Steve Dale, Don Williams (from the Lubbock Avalanche-Journal), Scott Fitzgerald (Texas Tech University graduate, not the radio host who has worked for WBT and WERC-FM), Johnny May, Paul R. Beane, Bill Maddux, Jim Stewart and Misty.

KKAM became the flagship radio station for Texas Tech Red Raiders football, men's basketball and baseball in the 1994-95 athletic season, through Loyd Senn's All Sports Radio Network (ASRN). The change ended the streak established by KFYO as Texas Tech's flagship radio station, that was started with its first broadcast of Texas Tech football in the 1940s. During KKAM's tenure as the Texas Tech flagship, football games were simulcast on KFMX and men's basketball games simulcast on 99.5 FM, the present-day KQBR. KKAM remained the flagship radio station for Texas Tech Football, Men's Basketball and Baseball through the 2008-09 athletic season.

On May 4, 2009, KKAM rebranded itself "SportsRadio 1340 The Fan" and added Dan Patrick, Jim Rome and Tony Bruno to the daily lineup. On May 28, 2009, KKAM changed network affiliations from ESPN Radio to Sporting News Radio. At the end of December 2012 the Williams and Hyatt Show left the station. In February 2013, SportsRadio 1340 The Fan changed network affiliations again, switching from Yahoo! Sports Radio (the former Sporting News Radio) to CBS Sports Radio. The Dan Patrick Show and Jack Dale's Sportsline, hosted by Steve Dale, remained a part of the daily lineup.

In February 2017, KKAM added the Fox Sports Radio programs hosted by Clay Travis and Colin Cowherd to the daily lineup.

On December 29, 2017, Steve Dale hosted the last edition of Sportsline on the station, moving the program online. On January 2, 2018, Weston Odom took over hosting duties of KKAM's local morning show, weekdays from 7 am-9 am. On October 15, 2018, The Rob Breaux Show with Rob Breaux and Karson Robinson became The Fan's local morning show, weekdays 7 am-9 am.

On October 22, 2018, KKAM announced a multi-year affiliation with the Kansas City Chiefs Radio Network, coinciding with the emergence of Texas Tech alum Patrick Mahomes as the team's star quarterback. Chiefs games would begin airing on 1340 The Fan for the remainder for the 2018 season.

On January 4, 2019, 1340 The Fan re-branded as "Talk 1340". The station is no longer all-sports, with Texas State Network news, ABC News Radio and select news/talk shows added to the lineup. The Rob Breaux Show with Karson Robinson moved to 9 am-11 am, weekdays, and Ryan Hyatt rejoined KKAM to host Raiderland Radio, weekdays 11 am-12 pm.

In March 2020, Karson Robinson left KKAM, and Rob Breaux joined Ryan Hyatt's Raiderland as co-host. The show was expanded to the weekday 11am-1pm timeslot and later syndicated to ESPN 960 KGKL_(AM) in San Angelo. A year later, Breaux added solo hosting duties for the weekday 1pm-2pm hour, plus hosted the syndicated "Rob Breaux's College Tailgate" on Saturday mornings. Breaux and Hyatt both left KKAM in May 2023, and Breaux continued his radio career in May 2024 at RAMAR's Double T 97.3 KTTU_(FM) & 100.7 The Score in Lubbock.

On April 1, 2026, KKAM was taken off the air permanently as Townsquare Media cited economic conditions for the reason of ending KKAM's broadcasts.
