= KONE (FM) =

Radio station in Lubbock, Texas

Coordinates: 33.4420°N 101.8782°W

Lubbock, Texas; United States
- Broadcast area: Lubbock metropolitan area
- Frequency: 101.1 MHz
- Branding: Rock 101

Programming
- Format: Classic rock

Ownership
- Owner: Connoisseur Media; (Alpha Media Licensee LLC)
- Sister stations: KBTE; KLLL-FM; KMMX

History
- First air date: December 1974 (as KTEZ)
- Former call signs: KTEZ (1974–1993)

Technical information
- Licensing authority: FCC
- Facility ID: 26519
- Class: C1
- ERP: 100,000 watts
- HAAT: 269 meters (883 ft)

Links
- Public license information: Public file; LMS
- Webcast: Listen live
- Website: www.rock101lubbock.com

KONE (101.1 MHz), known as "Rock 101", is a classic rock formatted FM radio station serving the Lubbock, Texas, and South Plains Area. Owned by Connoisseur Media, through licensee Alpha Media Licensee LLC, its studios are located in south Lubbock on Avenue Q west of I-27, and its transmitter is located south of the city.

== History ==
This station previously held the call letters KTEZ when it aired an easy listening format. It was founded in December 1974 by Troy Raymond "Ray" Moran (who would later found Ramar Communications.) It began with studios and transmitter in the former transmitter shack of KKBC-TV/KMXN-TV (predecessor of KJTV-TV). Moran had worked in Lubbock in the 1950 and 1960s. He was part owner of radio stations in Roswell and Albuquerque, New Mexico. Moran had engineer Guy D. Smith generate the technical filings for a new station on 101.1 (at the same time 102.5 was available; Moran sent a copy of his engineering to fellow broadcaster Jim Slone in Tucson, Arizona, which would lead to the establishment of KRUX). Studios moved to Suite 276 of the Plains National Bank building (Tower of the Plains) at 50th and University in 1977.

KTEZ was sold in 1983 to Lotus Communications for $1,050,000. The proceeds helped Moran continue development of KJAA, now KJTV-TV. Lotus sold the station to NextMedia Group, who in turn sold it to Wilks Broadcasting. Wilks sold its Lubbock stations to Alpha Media for $23 million in 2015.

Previous formats included Music of Your Life (ABC Stardust), soft AC, and country. The call letters were changed to KONE in 1993 when KTEZ (K-LITE 101.1) changed formats to country. The format changed to classic rock on November 21, 1999, under the Name "Rock 101.1". The "Rock 101.1" moniker changed to "101 The Beard" on the morning of March 12, 2020; the last song played under the old format was "Hey You" by Pink Floyd while the first song played under the "101 The Beard" name was "Even Flow" by Pearl Jam.

On March 11, 2022, KONE rebranded as "Rock 101".

Alpha Media merged with Connoisseur Media on September 4, 2025.

== Programming ==
The Billy Madison Show is Rock 101's syndicated morning show.

Local air talent includes The Man Made Radio Show (Afternoons 2-7p), and Dave Fernandez (Weekends).

The syndicated evening show is Nights with Alice Cooper.

== Community involvement ==
Rock 101.1 teams up with KBTE-FM every year to put together the Freedom Blood Drive which has happened since 2004. Rock 101.1 also partners up with charities around the South Plains to give donations. They have also worked with Parents of Soldiers around the world to give care packages.
