= KVOQ =

KVOQ may refer to:

- KVOQ (FM), a radio station (102.3 FM) licensed to serve Greenwood Village, Colorado
- KDCO (AM), a radio station (1340 AM) licensed to serve Denver, Colorado, which held the call sign KVOQ from 2011 to 2015
- KKHK, a radio station (95.5 FM) licensed to serve Carmel, California, United States, which held the call sign KVOQ from 1993 to 1994
- KKCL-FM, a radio station (98.1 FM) licensed to serve Lorenzo, Texas, United States, which held the call sign KVOQ from 1984 to 1989
