= KSSL =

- Post, Texas; United States
- Broadcast area: Lubbock, Texas
- Frequency: 107.3 MHz
- Branding: KSSL Radio

Programming
- Language: English
- Format: Classic country

Ownership
- Owner: Cathy J. Whitten

Technical information
- Licensing authority: FCC
- Facility ID: 30104
- Class: C2
- ERP: 22,000 watts
- HAAT: 228 meters (748 ft)
- Transmitter coordinates: 33°13′23.3″N 101°26′27.5″W
- Translator: 94.1 K231BE (Lubbock)
- Repeater: 107.7 KLZK-HD4 (Lubbock)

Links
- Public license information: Public file; LMS
- Webcast: Listen live
- Website: ksslfm.com

KSSL 107.3 FM is a radio station licensed to Post, Texas. The station broadcasts a classic country format and is owned by Cathy J. Whitten.

From May 2004 to July 2011, the station was owned by Educational Media Foundation and aired a contemporary Christian music format as an affiliate of Air 1.
