= KBTE =

Radio station in Tulia, Texas

Coordinates: 33.960°N 101.589°W

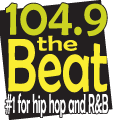
- Tulia, Texas; United States
- Broadcast area: Lubbock metropolitan area
- Frequency: 104.9 MHz
- Branding: 104.9 The Beat

Programming
- Format: Rhythmic contemporary
- Affiliations: Compass Media Networks

Ownership
- Owner: Connoisseur Media; (Alpha Media Licensee LLC)
- Sister stations: KLLL-FM; KMMX; KONE

History
- First air date: 1988
- Former call signs: KDOA (1988–1990); KJMX (1990–1999); KLGD (1999–2003)
- Call sign meaning: "Beat Texas"

Technical information
- Licensing authority: FCC
- Class: C1
- ERP: 96,600 watts
- HAAT: 298 meters (978 ft)

Links
- Public license information: Public file; LMS
- Webcast: Listen live
- Website: www.1049thebeat.com

KBTE (104.9 FM), known as "104.9 The Beat", is an Rhythmic contemporary formatted radio station owned by Connoisseur Media. Its city of license is Tulia, Texas, and it serves the Lubbock area with an ERP of 96,600 watts. Its studios are located in south Lubbock on Avenue Q west of I-27, and its transmitter is located southeast of Plainview, Texas in unincorporated Hale County.

== History ==
KBTE signed on the air as KDOA in 1988. The station has aired a Rhythmic music format since 2003, with a heavy emphasis on R&B/Hip-Hop hits. Before the station acquired the Rhythmic contemporary format, KBTE was an active rock station as "The Bat"; however the station began stunting with loops of The Go-Go's 1980s song "We Got The Beat" before the launch of The Beat.
