= KKCL-FM =

- Lorenzo, Texas; United States
- Broadcast area: Lubbock metropolitan area
- Frequency: 98.1 MHz
- Branding: Awesome 98!

Programming
- Format: Classic hits
- Affiliations: Compass Media Networks; United Stations Radio Networks; Kansas City Chiefs

Ownership
- Owner: Townsquare Media; (Townsquare License, LLC)
- Sister stations: KFMX-FM; KFYO; KKAM; KQBR; KZII-FM

History
- First air date: 1984
- Former call signs: KVOQ (1984–1989); KKCL (1989–2015)
- Call sign meaning: "Cool" (former branding)

Technical information
- Licensing authority: FCC
- Facility ID: 1721
- Class: C2
- ERP: 36,000 watts
- HAAT: 175 meters (574 ft)
- Transmitter coordinates: 33.518°N 101.857°W

Links
- Public license information: Public file; LMS
- Webcast: Listen live
- Website: awesome98.com

KKCL-FM (98.1 MHz, "Awesome 98!") is a radio station broadcasting a classic hits format. Licensed to Lorenzo, Texas and serving Lubbock, Texas, United States, the station is currently under ownership of Townsquare Media. Its studios and transmitter are located in south Lubbock.

== History ==
Two applications were filed for the channel that is now used by KKCL. A class A on 98.3 was allocated to Ralls, Texas. One filed for a class A in Ralls and the winner "KB Radio" (partnership of Bryan King and Steve Bumpous) filed for a new station in Lorenzo, Texas, which went on as KVOQ in 1984. The station ran round the clock from a studio and tower near the Lubbock (Idalou) Speedway racetrack. Then-regulations allowed a channel in the Federal Communications Commission table of allotments to be used in the listed city or in an unlisted city within a range of 10–15 miles depending on class of station.

BK arranged to move the station to a new site and adjacent channel for an upgraded signal on 98.1. This new construction permit was sold to Anthony Brandon in 1986, and studios moved to Park Tower at 28th and Avenue Q in Lubbock. The station was variously adult contemporary, easy listening, and finally oldies (with Rush Limbaugh) which finally put it on the map.

Lew Dee and Diana served as morning show hosts in the 1990s through February 2002. Rush Limbaugh was moved off KKCL to sister station KFYO in 1999.

KKCL was sold to the Hicks family interests in the fall of 1996 that eventually rolled up into Clear Channel Communications. Clear Channel sold the station to Gap Broadcasting in 2007; what eventually became Gap Central Broadcasting (following the formation of GapWest Broadcasting) was folded into Townsquare Media on August 13, 2010.

On December 29, 2015, KKCL rebranded as "Awesome 98!", with a slight shift to 1970s/1980s music, along with some 1990s and 2000s music. Weekends feature music from the 1980s (Awesome 80's Weekends).

Presently, all KKCL personalities are based outside of Lubbock, and appear via voicetracking as part of Townsquare Media's "TLA3" system, with music and DJ content sent via the internet and airing in several different cities simultaneously.
