= KTTU-FM =

- New Deal, Texas; United States
- Broadcast area: Lubbock, Texas
- Frequency: 97.3 MHz (HD Radio)
- Branding: Double T 97.3

Programming
- Language: English
- Format: Sports
- Subchannels: HD2: Sports (KTTU); HD3: Oldies; HD4: Conservative talk
- Affiliations: Westwood One Sports; ESPN Radio; Fox Sports Radio

Ownership
- Owner: Ramar Communications, Inc.
- Sister stations: KLBB-FM; KRBL-FM; KTTU-AM; KXTQ-FM

History
- First air date: 1961
- Former call signs: KPLA (1961–1976); KATX (1976–1995); KVOP-FM (1995–1999); KHDY (1999–2002, 2002–2003); KLZK (2002); KJTV-FM (2003–2004); KSTQ-FM (2004–2008); KLZK (2008–2015)
- Call sign meaning: Texas Tech University

Technical information
- Licensing authority: FCC
- Facility ID: 54684
- Class: C2
- ERP: 22,500 watts
- HAAT: 228 meters (748 ft)
- Transmitter coordinates: 33°30′8.3″N 101°52′21.3″W
- Translators: HD3: 97.7 K249DU (Lubbock); HD4: 92.3 K222CQ (Lubbock)

Links
- Public license information: Public file; LMS
- Webcast: Listen live; Listen live (HD2); Listen live (HD3); Listen live (HD4)
- Website: doublet973.com; 1007thescore.com (HD2); sunny97.com (HD3); 923thehub.com (HD4)

KTTU-FM (97.3 FM, "Double T 97.3") is a radio station licensed to New Deal, Texas, United States, and owned by Ramar Communications Inc. of Lubbock serving the Lubbock area. KLZK was originally on 104.3. On March 30, 2008, KLZK-FM swapped frequencies with sister station KSTQ-FM.

97.3 was activated in 1961 as KPLA (FM) Plainview, Texas. It operated separately from sister station KVOP (AM). KPLA raised power to 100,000 watts at 500 feet in 1976. Call letters changed to KATX at the same time.

As part of a format change to News/Talk/Sports in October 2003, simulcasting KJTV, Ramar built an 800-foot tower near Petersburg, Texas. That tower fell in a small plane mishap in 2004 and was replaced. In late March 2008, Ramar executed a Construction Permit to change 97.3 from a class C1 to class C2, and change the city of license from Plainview to New Deal, Texas. Ramar also abandoned the Petersburg tower to relocate 97.3 into the Lubbock metro, broadcasting from the KJTV-TV tower at 98th and University.

KLZK was also known as KISS 104.3 FM and the format was a Hip-Hop and R&B station. At this time it was licensed to the city of Brownfield, TX.

At the end of 2007, Ramar Communications received a Construction Permit to change the city of license for KLZK from Plainview to New Deal and to move its transmitter site from the Petersburg Tower to the Ramar Tower at 98th and University Avenue in Lubbock.

On September 12, 2011, KLZK, after a weekend of stunting, changed their format to hot adult contemporary, branded as "97.3 Yes FM".

On December 18, 2015 at 10 AM, as part of a 5-way radio station swap, 97.3 and 104.3 swapped formats again, as KLZK-FM 97.3 YES FM moved to 107.7 YES FM KLZK-FM and KTTU-FM "Double T 104.3" Sports format moved to 97.3 FM as "Double T 97.3".

Also, 97.3 (became KTTU-FM on December 29, 2015) became the new flagship station for the Texas Tech Sports Network. Double T 97.3 would air Texas Tech Football, Men's Basketball and Baseball games. 107.7 YES-FM (KLZK-FM) became the flagship for Texas Tech Lady Raider Basketball games. As part of the swap, Ramar's 93.7 The Eagle would no longer broadcast Texas Tech Football and Men's Basketball games, but Magic 106.5 did pick up the English-language broadcasts of Texas Tech Football.

In June 2019, Ramar executed a series of lineup changes for Double T 97.3 and 100.7 The Score. The main ESPN Radio affiliation, including Golic and Wingo, were moved off of Double T 97.3 to 100.7 The Score (950 AM KTTU). Double T 97.3's main network affiliation changed to FOX Sports Radio with Dan Patrick and Colin Cowherd added on a tape-delayed basis, weekdays from 9 am-3 pm. CBS Sports Radio airs Monday-Saturday from 9 pm-Midnight on Double T 97.3. The midday local shows on Double T 97.3 were moved to 100.7 The Score, airing between 9 am-3 pm.

In 2024, the television program Texas Country Reporter profiled Double T 97.3 hosts David Thetford and Gary Ashby.

Over the years, hosts on Double T 97.3 have included: Chuck Heinz, Jamie Lent, Casey Cowan, Chris Level, Robert Giovanetti, Chris Snead, Chois Woodman, David Thetford, Gary Ashby, David Collier, Geoff Haxton, Rob Breaux, Jeff McGuire, Clint Scott, Mark Finkner, Nick Long, Andres Flores, Rob Verby, Brian Hanni, and Garrett Luft.

== HD formats ==
KTTU-FM (formerly KLZK-FM) has added a rock music format on its HD2 sub channel, feeding 96.9 FM (K245BG), branded as "Rock 96.9", and an oldies format on its HD3 sub channel, feeding 97.7 FM (K249DU) branded as "Oldies 97.7". The HD3 oldies format launched on August 15, 2013. On August 11, 2018, KTTU-FM added an HD4 sub-channel, feeding 93.1 FM (K226CH) with a Texas Country music format, branded as "93.1 Texas FM".

On February 1, 2019, KTTU-HD2 feeding 96.9 FM (K245BG) changed their format from rock music to classic country (90s Country & More), branded as "96.9 The Bull".

On July 1, 2024, KTTU-HD2 became a simulcast of 950 AM's "100.7 The Score" sports format. Also on July 1, 2024, KTTU-HD4 changed their format from Texas country to hot adult contemporary, branded as "93.1 Yes FM".

== History ==
KLZK originally began broadcasting at 104.3 FM in 1995 and was owned by former Lubbock City Councilman Paul R. Beane.
