= KFYO (AM) =

Radio station in Lubbock, Texas

Coordinates: 33°27′50.3″N 101°55′31.6″W

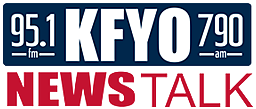
- Lubbock, Texas; United States
- Broadcast area: Lubbock metropolitan area
- Frequency: 790 kHz
- Branding: NewsTalk 95.1 & 790, KFYO

Programming
- Format: Talk radio
- Affiliations: ABC News Radio; Compass Media Networks; Premiere Networks; Radio America; Westwood One; KAMC; Texas State Network

Ownership
- Owner: Townsquare Media; (Townsquare License, LLC)
- Sister stations: KFMX-FM, KKAM, KKCL-FM, KQBR, KZII-FM

History
- First air date: September 6, 1927

Technical information
- Licensing authority: FCC
- Facility ID: 61151
- Class: B
- Power: 5,000 watts (day); 1,000 watts (night)
- Translator: 95.1 K236CP (Lubbock)

Links
- Public license information: Public file; LMS
- Webcast: Listen live
- Website: kfyo.com

KFYO (790 AM) is a commercial radio station licensed to Lubbock, Texas, United States. Owned by Townsquare Media, it features a talk format. Studios are on 82nd Street in southwest Lubbock, and the transmitter is off Slide Road at 146th Street in Lubbock. Programming is also heard on 250-watt FM translator K236CP on 95.1 MHz in Lubbock.

== History ==
=== Before Lubbock ===
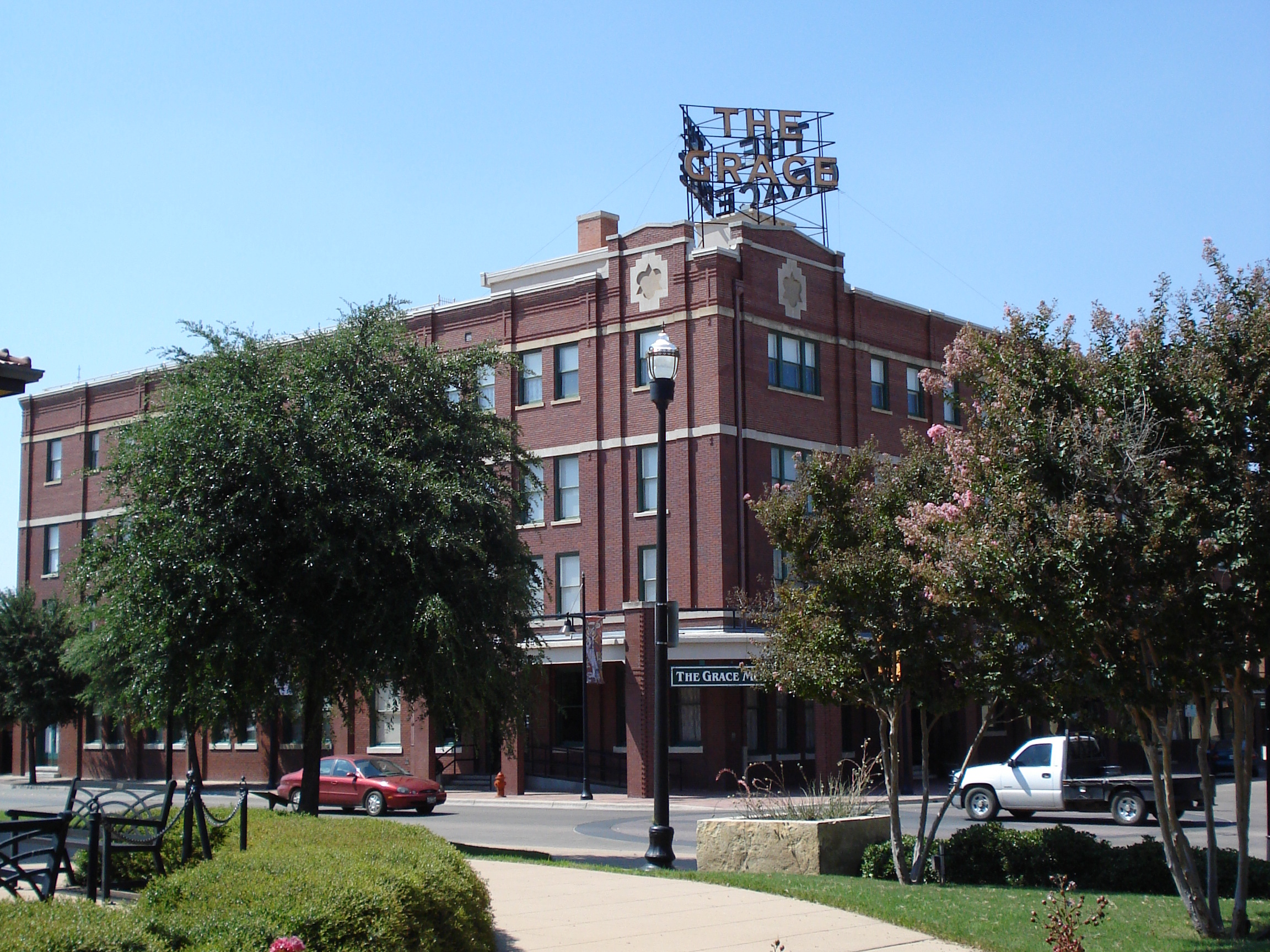
The Grace Hotel (now a museum) housed KFYO during its time in Abilene.

In 1927, T. E. Kirksey, under the Kirksey Bros. Battery and Electric Company, established a radio station at Breckenridge. Launching on September 6, 1927, KFYO operated with 15 watts on 1420 kHz. In early 1928, it was allowed to increase power to 100 watts.

On September 22, 1928, KFYO moved to Abilene, where it remained on 1420 and upgraded to 250 watts day and 100 watts night. The station maintained studios in the Grace Hotel. 16-year-old Grant Turner, later an announcer for the Grand Ole Opry in Nashville, joined the station when it moved to Abilene.

At times, KFYO has claimed a longer history, stretching back to an experimental station allegedly started by Kirksey in 1923, in Bentonville, Arkansas. However, no station was licensed to Kirksey there. Bentonville's first radio station was KFVX, run by Ralph H. Porter in 1925 but closed the same year. There was an earlier and unrelated KFYO, which operated at Texarkana, Texas. KFYO Texarkana shut down in February 1927, and KFYO Breckenridge received a construction permit six months later.

=== Moving to Lubbock ===
In February 1932, Kirksey filed and was approved to move KFYO to Lubbock on 1310 kHz, utilizing a site at 2312 5th Street, three blocks east of Texas Tech University. The station began broadcasting from Lubbock on April 23. Two years later, the station moved to new downtown studios and offices located at 914 Avenue J. Also in 1934, KFYO aired the first-ever radio broadcast of a Texas Tech football game; it then began broadcasting games regularly in 1935, holding the rights continuously through the 1993 season.

Several other cornerstones of KFYO programming and Lubbock history passed through KFYO at this time. In 1935, the station began airing the Sunday morning services of the Downtown (Lubbock) Bible Class Sunday morning services; the weekly service aired on KFYO until 1946 and returned to KFYO from KSEL in December 1987. The precursor of the Chuck Wagon Gang—then known as the Carter Quartet—made its radio debut that same year over KFYO, performing weekly and earning the group $15 a week. The group included David Parker Carter 'Dad', son Jim (born Ernest) and daughters Rose and Effie. In 1936, the Carters changed their group name to the Chuck Wagon Gang, moved to the Dallas-Fort Worth area, and joined radio station WBAP.

=== Plains Radio ownership ===
Kirksey sold the station he had built—and moved twice—to the Plains Radio Broadcasting Company, owned by the Lubbock Avalanche-Journal and Amarillo Globe-News newspapers. DeWitt "Judge" Landis became the general manager, and KFYO affiliated with NBC. The new owners also rebuilt the transmission facility, which was still using the original transmitter put into service at Breckenridge ten years prior. The station would change affiliations several more times, to the Mutual Broadcasting System in 1937 and again to the Blue Network, later ABC, in 1944. KFYO moved to 1340 kHz in NARBA reallocation on March 29, 1941; the year before, it increased its power to 250 watts.

On July 1, 1945, KFYO broadcast live from Lubbock's airfield, when the first commercial airline flight made its way to Lubbock. The flight was a Braniff Airways flight from Dallas, that continued to Albuquerque. The station also operated an FM simulcast—KFYO-FM 99.5, the first FM station on the South Plains—from April 18, 1948, to 1950.

KFYO would engage in a seven-year fight to improve its facilities in the late 1940s and early 1950s. In 1945, KFYO filed to move to 790 kHz and increase its power to 5,000 watts. The Federal Communications Commission initially denied the bid in favor of a competing application from Lubbock County Broadcasting Company, which owned KBWD in Brownwood, but KFYO appealed and was successful in having the case remanded for new hearings in 1949. Despite a hearing examiner finding in favor of Lubbock County in 1950, the FCC awarded the frequency to KFYO in October 1951. The frequency change took place on January 19, 1953, at which time the station activated its three-tower array near 82nd and Quaker streets. The new facility allowed KFYO to be heard in Amarillo, Abilene, Midland, Odessa, San Angelo, Ozona and eastern New Mexico. 1340 was awarded to a new station, KDUB.

On June 1, 1954, KFYO switched affiliations from ABC to CBS Radio, giving the network its first outlet in Lubbock and first reliable reception in much of the South Plains.

KFYO was the only station to broadcast continuously before, during, and after the Lubbock tornado that struck the downtown area on May 11, 1970. KFYO also provided Lubbock's only link to the outside world during the tornado by broadcasting over phone to 1080 KRLD in Dallas. Because KFYO was the assigned civil defense radio station in Lubbock, the station was equipped with two diesel backup generators, which provided power for KFYO's studios and transmitter site at 82nd & Quaker. With much of the city damaged and without power for days—and with two radio stations having lost their towers in the storm—KFYO became the vital link for Lubbock and the region in the hours and days after the tornado, broadcasting multiple 24-hour commercial-free days and receiving local, state and national awards for its coverage, including a citation from President Richard Nixon.

=== KFYO after 1973 ===
KFYO, Inc., controlled by S. B. Whittenburg, bought the station in 1973; it was sold six years later to the Seaton Publishing Company in a $1.3 million transaction. The new owners substituted the station's beautiful music programs with a country music format.

The call letters KFYO briefly returned to the FM band in 1985 when the station bought the former KRUX (102.5 FM); the station became KZII-FM on March 27, 1986. That same year, the stations moved to a new studio and tower site on South Slide Road, housing both stations and a new three-tower array for KFYO. Part of the former KFYO transmitter site at 82nd and Quaker was redeveloped into the Kingsgate North shopping center.

In March 1997, KFYO and KZII-FM were sold to GulfStar Communications, who also owned KFMX-FM, KKAM and KRLB-FM 99.5 in Lubbock. The studios returned to 82nd and Quaker, in the Copy Craft building that housed the other GulfStar stations, though the KFYO transmitter remained on South Slide. Clear Channel Communications acquired the GulfStar Lubbock cluster in 2000. In August 2010, KFYO owner Gap Central Broadcasting, which had purchased the Lubbock cluster from Clear Channel in 2007, was folded into Townsquare Media.

=== Texas Tech Red Raiders & the Modern Era of KFYO ===
KFYO was the longtime home of Texas Tech Red Raiders football and men's basketball games starting with the first Texas Tech Football game broadcast in 1934 and continuing into the mid-1990s. Jack Dale was the "Voice of the Red Raiders" from 1953 to 2003 and also served as KFYO's Sales Manager in 1960s and 70s. On Christmas Eve 1993, KFYO broadcast a Red Raider football game for the final time as the team's flagship radio partner. That game was a 41–10 loss to the Oklahoma Sooners in the 1993 John Hancock Bowl, with Jack Dale as the play-by-play announcer and John Harris on color commentary. The games moved to 94.5 KFMX & KKAM the following year, as part of Loyd Senn's All Sports Radio Network (ASRN), with Dale & Harris retaining their roles.

In late February 2003, Jim Stewart left KFYO. Stewart had served as KFYO's Ag Director for over 20 years and for most of the time hosted the Weekday 6am and 12pm hours. In the 1990s through 2001, Stewart's daily ag features were syndicated across West Texas via the Loyd Senn-owned Ag Producers Radio Network (APRN). APRN was sold to Clear Channel Communications in 2001 and the Oklahoma City Agri-Hub absorbed operations in late 2001. Stewart's radio career was chronicled by Texas Country Reporter in late 2023.

As part of a changing talk radio landscape, KFYO changed its network affiliation in 2003. On June 1, KFYO ended a 49-year affiliation with CBS and began an affiliation with ABC News Radio, airing such ABC features as Paul Harvey and Sean Hannity.

In December 2010, the Lubbock Bible Class aired its final service and disbanded, having aired their Sunday service on KFYO for a total of 37 years.

In 1970, KFYO donated a 1927 Model T once owned by the station and painted with news headlines of that year to the Texas Tech Museum. In 2015, state representative John Frullo donated $1,000 for the restoration of the Model T.

In October 2016, KFYO added an FM simulcast on the 95.1 FM translator, licensed to Lubbock. Branding for the station changed to "News/Talk 95.1 & 790, KFYO".

In February 2017, Tom Collins and Laura Mac left KFYO, and Dave King and Matt Martin took over hosting KFYO's morning show.

In November 2020, Paul R. Beane was inducted into the Texas Radio Hall of Fame. KFYO was Paul's last stop in his storied radio career, hosting the commentary "The Way I See It" from 2010 to 2014.

Chad Hasty took over as late-afternoon host on January 18, 2021, following the departure of Robert Pratt; the show was regionally syndicated to other Townsquare-owned talk stations in Texas.

In May 2022, Robert Snyder left KFYO, after a 21-year career as the News Director- Program Director. During Snyder's tenure, KFYO rebuilt its news department from scratch, he anchored numerous hours of severe weather coverage with KAMC-TV's Ron Roberts, KFYO expanded its local talk programming to seven days a week, and began an FM simulcast with the addition of the 95.1 FM translator in October 2016.

In April 2023, Matt Martin leaves the KFYO Midday Show as his family moved out of state. Michael McDermott took over the Weekday 8:30am-11am timeslot, hosting the program "McDermott at Large". The show moved to KWBF-AM, in Lubbock, in late October 2023.

In late May 2023, Dave King announced he was retiring from the KFYO morning show "Sunrise LBK" for health reasons; King died the following month. Following King's passing, Ken Corbin and Matt Crow joined Tom Collins as rotating co-hosts for "Sunrise LBK" with Matt Crow permanently joining Tom Collins on "Sunrise LBK" in late March 2024.

First United Methodist Church of Lubbock, at the end of 2023, ended an over 50-year relationship with KFYO when it ceased airing its Sunday 11a.m. church service. First United Methodist Church had aired a Sunday morning church service on KFYO since 1952.

In April 2024, Nicholas Tauschek was named KFYO's Brand Manager. Tauschek holds two degrees from Texas Tech University and previously worked at 101.1 KONE-FM and Texas Tech's 88.1 KTXT-FM before he joined KFYO in 2021.

On October 1, 2025, KFYO dropped ABC News and began an affiliation with FOX News for their 5-minute top of the hour network newscasts

On April 30, 2026 - KFYO talk show host Chad Hasty died at the age of 43. Chad worked in Lubbock radio for over 20 years, starting at 950 KJTV, before joining 1340 KKAM and 790 KFYO. Chad's life, and contributions to public service, was honored with proclimations from Governor Greg Abbott, Speaker of the House Dustin Burrows, State Senator Charles Perry and State Rep. Carl Tepper. https://kfyo.com/chad-hasty-passing/

July 2026, Steve Evans and Ken Corbin officially take over Chad Hasty's afternoon timeslot, renaming the show, "The Steve Evans Show". "The Steve Evans Show" remains syndicated to KYYW- Abilene, KIXZ- Amarillo and KWFS-AM- Wichita Falls.

July 2026- Former KFYO Ag Director Jim Stewart passed away. After leaving KFYO in 2003, Jim worked as Ag Director for 20 years at 580 KRFE from 2005 to 2025.

== FM translator ==
On October 12, 2016, KFYO added an FM simulcast on 95.1 MHz.

Broadcast translator for KFYO
Call sign	Frequency	City of license	FID	ERP (W)	Class	FCC info
K236CP	95.1 FM	Lubbock, Texas	147711	250	D	LMS

== Programming ==
Local personalities on KFYO include Tom Collins, Matt Crow, Steve Evans, Ken Corbin & Nick Tauschek.
