= KQBR =

- Lubbock, Texas; United States
- Broadcast area: Lubbock metropolitan area
- Frequency: 99.5 MHz
- Branding: Lonestar 99.5

Programming
- Format: Country
- Affiliations: Compass Media Networks; Premiere Networks

Ownership
- Owner: Townsquare Media; (Townsquare License, LLC)
- Sister stations: KFMX; KFYO; KKAM; KKCL; KZII

History
- First air date: 1964 (as KWGN-FM)
- Former call signs: KFYO-FM (1948–1952); KWGN-FM (1964–1966); KWGO-FM (1966–1981); KRLB-FM (1981–1999); KCRM (1999)
- Call sign meaning: reference to "The Bear", the station's former moniker

Technical information
- Licensing authority: FCC
- Facility ID: 60800
- Class: C1
- ERP: 100,000 watts
- HAAT: 249 meters (817 ft)
- Transmitter coordinates: 33°31′4.4″N 101°51′24.6″W

Links
- Public license information: Public file; LMS
- Webcast: Listen live
- Website: lonestar995fm.com

KQBR (99.5 FM, "Lonestar 99.5") is a radio station broadcasting a country music format. Licensed to Lubbock, Texas, United States, the station is currently under ownership of Townsquare Media. Its studios and transmitter are located in south Lubbock.

== History ==
99.5 (channel 258) was assigned to Lubbock. It was used in the late 1940s and early 1950s as KFYO-FM.

The frequency was reactivated in 1964 as KWGN-FM in Abernathy, Texas. Power was 57,000 watts at 150 feet from a tower a few miles north of Abernathy (25 miles north of Lubbock). The station was put on by a partnership headed by Clyde Robert "Bob" Stephens, and his brother Raymond V. Stephens. Bob Stephens had worked at KSEL radio, would work at KSEL-TV and KCBD-TV as TV weatherman. Raymond continued in radio throughout Texas and New Mexico.

In 1966 KWGN-FM was approached by Tribune Broadcasting (WGN Chicago et al.) about changing call letters. Tribune was in the process of acquiring channel 2 KCTO-TV in Denver, CO. They wanted to change to KWGN-TV. KWGN-FM changed to KWGO-FM in exchange for $28,000.

In 1970 the station moved its transmitter to 98th and University in Lubbock. Power changed to 44,000 watts and height changed to 740 feet above average terrain. City of license changed to Lubbock, Texas. Studios moved to 17th and K in downtown Lubbock. In 1974 the tower at 98th and University was sold to Ray Moran who was putting 101.1 KTEZ on the air. KTEZ paid to move KWGO to a lower perch on the tower, using less feed line, allowing an increase to 46,000 watts at 630 feet. Studios moved to the Red Raider Inn on a traffic circle (roundabout) where avenue A, H, and Q came together between 66th street and 50th street.

Various partners came and went in the next decade. In 1975, Stephens sold 49% of the station to "Mexican American Services, Inc" for 60,000 dollars. A couple of years later (1977) Stephens sold the other 51% for another 60,000 dollars. KWGO was sold to KRLB, Inc (owner of AM 580 KRLB) in 1980 for 380,000 dollars. The station became winners in the eighties and sold to Jack Rich's AM/FM Communications (not the big AMFM that went into Clear Channel) for 1.45MM in 1985.

In 1988, KRLB-FM and sister AM KJBX were sold to Ken Dowe of KLIF 1190 Dallas Fame for 3.67MM. Dowe owned several stations throughout Texas. He continued co-ownership of KRLB-AM-FM until the mid-1990s when it was sold to South Plains Broadcasting.

In 1985, the station's transmitting location moved to a shared tower spearheaded by KFMX, KFYO, and KLLL, known as the Lubbock Tower.

In mid-1995, KRLB FM99, a Hot A/C format was changed for KCRM Classic Rock. Also, in the mid-1990s, 99.5 became the radio home for Texas Tech Red Raider Basketball games (simulcast with KKAM). 99.5 would air Red Raider Basketball games through the 2008-09 season (In 2009 the games moved to KTTU-FM). In the fall of 1999, 99.5 changed from KCRM, The Cream of Classic Rock, to KQBR 99.5 The Bear, country music.

May 5, 2012: Townsquare Media drops "The Bear" branding in favor of '99.5 Blake FM'. Morning show hosts, Rick Gilbert and Jane Prince-Jones and program director Kidd Manning were not retained after the rebranding.

On August 30, 2014, KQBR rebranded as "Lonestar 99.5", with no other changes. On August 30, 2024, Lonestar 99.5's last local DJ, Kelsee Pitman, was relived of her duties.
