= KLZK-FM =

- Idalou, Texas; United States
- Broadcast area: Lubbock, Texas
- Frequency: 105.7 MHz
- Branding: Classical 105.7

Programming
- Language: English
- Format: Classical
- Affiliations: American Public Media

Ownership
- Owner: Lubbock Public Media

History
- First air date: 2012 (as KLBB-FM)
- Former call signs: KLBB-FM (2012–2015); KXTQ-FM (2015–2016)

Technical information
- Licensing authority: FCC
- Facility ID: 68155
- Class: C3
- ERP: 25,000 watts
- HAAT: 87 meters (285 ft)
- Transmitter coordinates: 33°39′47.3″N 101°35′53.6″W

Links
- Public license information: Public file; LMS
- Webcast: Listen live
- Website: classical1057.org

KLZK-FM (105.7 MHz, "Classical 105.7") is a radio station licensed to Idalou, Texas and serving the Lubbock, Texas area. KLZK is owned by Lubbock Public Media.

On July 1, 2024, KLZK-FM changed their format from hot adult contemporary, which moved to KTTU-HD4, to classical music branded as "Classical 105.7".
