= KZII-FM =

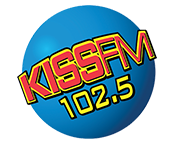
- Lubbock, Texas; United States
- Broadcast area: Lubbock, Texas
- Frequency: 102.5 MHz
- Branding: 102.5 Kiss FM

Programming
- Format: Top 40 (CHR)
- Affiliations: Compass Media Networks; Premiere Networks

Ownership
- Owner: Townsquare Media; (Townsquare License, LLC)
- Sister stations: KFMX-FM, KFYO, KKAM, KKCL-FM, KQBR

History
- First air date: March 10, 1982 (as KRUX)
- Former call signs: KRUX (1981–1985); KFYO-FM (1985–1986)
- Call sign meaning: A nod to the now-former "Z102" slogan or similar to "kiss"

Technical information
- Licensing authority: FCC
- Facility ID: 61150
- Class: C1
- ERP: 100,000 watts
- HAAT: 249 meters (817 ft)
- Transmitter coordinates: 33°31′4.10″N 101°51′23.20″W

Links
- Public license information: Public file; LMS
- Webcast: Listen Live
- Website: 1025kiss.com

KZII-FM (102.5 MHz), known as "102-5 Kiss FM" is a top 40 (CHR) formatted radio station serving Lubbock, Texas. The station is owned by Townsquare Media. Its studios and transmitter are located in south Lubbock.

== History ==
KZII went on air on April 15, 1948, as KFYO-FM. According to Jack Dale, it signed off a few years later (in 1950) after limited use. From the 1950 edition of Broadcasting Yearbook KFYO-FM broadcast on 99.5 FM (now the present-day KQBR-FM, Lonestar 99.5) at 13,000 watts of power. Then in mid-March 1982 the station was back on the air as KRUX. Studios were on the third floor of the Plains Bank building at 5010 50th, and the transmitter was at 98th and University (the KJTV tower). Station featured "six packs" of country music. It was owned by Rex Broadcasting Corporation, owner of KCUB and KIIM-FM in Tucson, Arizona, and KROD and KLAQ in El Paso, Texas.

Rex was owned by Jim Sloane, and had filed for the station on 102.5 in 1977. A couple of other local stations (580 KDAV and 1590 KEND) also filed for the channel. The original engineering had been prepared by Guy Smith at the Ray Moran stations (Albuquerque and Roswell). Moran filed for 101.1 in 1973 and received it unopposed in 1973, went on air in 1974. Sloane delayed filing until the later 1970s and ended up in a comparative hearing for the station.

KRUX was sold to the owners of crosstown 790 KFYO in mid-1985. Studios were consolidated at the KFYO Transmitter Site at 4322 82nd Street (present-day Kingsgate North shopping center). Then, in 1986 the Z102/KFYO studios and KFYO 790 AM transmitter site were moved to 143rd Street & South Slide Road, south of Lubbock, south of FM 1585. The studios were then moved again in the Fall of 1996 to the then Gulfstar (later Capstar, then AM/FM, then Clear Channel in 2001, then GAP and now Townsquare Media) studios at 4413 82nd Street (82nd and Quaker).

By year end in 1985, the 102.5 transmitter had been relocated to a temporary location in north Lubbock, and in 1985-1986 the transmitter was moved to a new tower at 82nd and Avenue P (The Lubbock Tower) shared by then 94.5 KFMX, 96.3 KLLL, 99.5 KRLB (now KQBR), and 102.5 KFYO-FM. In the late 1990s ('98 or '99) 98.1 KKCL moved on to The Lubbock Tower, with 95.5 KAIQ-FM moving onto The Lubbock Tower in 2004.

After Gulfstar's parent company, Capstar, merged with Chancellor Broadcasting, these stations were eventually sold to one of the Hicks family controlled groups that were later rolled up into Clear Channel Communications.

In 2006, Clear Channel announced they were going private, and later announced they would sell many of their smaller market stations, including their cluster in Lubbock. GAP Broadcasting purchased these stations, including KZII-FM.

On Tuesday, March 17, 2009, at midnight, GAP Broadcasting dropped the Z102 format in favor of the "Kiss FM" branding. The station became 102.5 Kiss FM at 5 p.m. on March 20, 2009.

What eventually became Gap Central Broadcasting (following the formation of GapWest Broadcasting) was folded into Townsquare Media on August 13, 2010.

== Programming ==
Kiss FM's current format is Mainstream CHR which is a variant of Top 40, although the station has shifted between Mainstream CHR and Rhythmic CHR over the past 10 years, as different stations entered the Lubbock market to compete.

From the 1990s through mid-2001, Z102 was the home of Jay (Shannon), Chris (Kelly) and Dina (Morales) in the Morning. The show was regionally syndicated throughout West Texas in the late 1990s, 2000 & 2001. Affiliate stations included Power 98.7 in Amarillo, 103.3 KCRS-FM Midland/Odessa and 100.7 FM in Abilene. The show (and Texas syndication) briefly moved to 96.7 KHFI-FM, in Austin, in 2001. Before the end of 2001, Chris & Dina moved back to Lubbock to host "Chris & Dina in the Morning" which was exclusively heard on Z102. Jay Shannon then went on to serve two separate stints as OM/PD for KHFI from 2001 to 2014. In his time at KHFI, Shannon found a DJ named Bobby Bones and eventually created a morning show centered on him. The present-day Bobby Bones Show was originally patterned after "Jay, Chris & Dina in the Morning" with Bobby filling the role that Jay served, Lunchbox filling the antagonist Chris Kelly role and Amy taking Dina's role.

For a number of years in the 2000s, into the early 2010s, on Saturdays from 8 to 11PM KISS FM broadcast live from Heaven Nightclub called "Saturday Night Heaven". The remote broadcast was ended in 2011. In March 2016, assistant program director Boleo brought back the weekend party with Turn Up Friday's which originates from Lubbock's Club Pink. It would later move to Saturday nights in a sporadic fashion.

The 5 O'Clock Bomboocha began on KISS FM in February 2017. The original host was Tommy the Hacker simulcasting from Townsquare sister station 96.9 KXSS FM, Tommy the Hacker would do the show from Wild 104.3 - KQFX-FM Amarillo - after his departure from KXSS. In late March 2017, DJ Lopez would take over hosting and DJ duties on the Bomboocha. As of June 2018 hosting duties were split between DJ Lopez, Tommy the Hacker and Local DJ Ricky Ri. The Bomboocha was discontinued in July 2019 by Townsquare Corporate despite local outrage for the cancellation.

On air, Z102's positioning included "Hot Hitz, 102.5 Z102"; "H - I - T - Z102" (spelling of "hits"); "Continuous Hit Music, 102.5 Z102"; "Your #1 Hit Music Station, 102.5 Z102"; and was "Lubbock's #1 Hit Music Station, Z102" prior to changing to the "Kiss FM" branding. Current branding is All The Hits, 102.5 KISS FM.

== Personalities ==
Current on-air personalities include - The Jubal Show, Midday Michelle, E, and PopCrush Nights with Kayla Thomas.

Former on-air personalities include - Boleo (Who is still with Townsquare Media as an engineer in Abilene, Midland, and San Angelo Texas.), DJ Ricky Ri, Renee Raven (Who is currently on Townsquare's KFMX.), 'E' aka The Heathen formerly part of The Rockshow on FMX, Big (who died in September 2019), Lisa Paige, Jess, Steve Sever, Jay Shannon, Chris Kelly, Dina Morales, Bobby Ramos, DJ Lopez, Tommy the Hacker, Kelli D'Angelo, Cory Austin, The Jammer
