= KXTQ-FM =

Coordinates: 33.419°N 102.150°W

Lubbock, Texas; United States
- Frequency: 106.5 MHz
- Branding: Magic 106.5

Programming
- Format: Tejano music

Ownership
- Owner: Ramar Communications, Inc.
- Sister stations: KLBB-FM; KRBL-FM; KTTU-AM; KTTU-FM

History
- First air date: 1992; 33 years ago
- Former call signs: KEJS (1987–2015); KTTU-FM (2015); KLZK (2015–2016)

Technical information
- Licensing authority: FCC
- Facility ID: 4019
- Class: C2
- ERP: 34,000 watts
- HAAT: 179 meters (587 ft)

Links
- Public license information: Public file; LMS
- Webcast: Listen live
- Website: magic1065.com

KXTQ-FM (106.5 MHz), known as "Magic 106.5", is a radio station owned by Ramar Communications Inc. of Lubbock. The station's community of license is Lubbock, Texas, and it serves the greater Lubbock area with an ERP of 34 kW. Its studios and transmitter are located in south Lubbock.

== 106.5 History ==
106.5 began broadcasting in October 1992 as Tejano music KEJS-FM POWER 106. It was co-owned with the West Texas Hispanic News as a service of Barton Broadcasting, Inc.

On August 11, 2015, Ramar Communications entered into an agreement with Barton Broadcasting to swap frequencies 104.3 for 106.5. When the swap was closed on December 18, 2015, at 10 AM five radio stations simultaneously relocated to new frequencies on "Radio Moving Day", Double T moved to 97.3, Magic moved to 106.5, YES FM! moved to 107.7, The Eagle moved to 93.7 and POWER moved to 104.3, . On January 6, 2016, KLZK changed their call letters to KXTQ-FM.
