= KTTU (AM) =

Coordinates: 33°34′53″N 101°49′38″W

- Lubbock, Texas; United States
- Frequency: 950 kHz
- Branding: 100.7 The Score

Programming
- Format: Sports
- Affiliations: Texas Tech Sports Network from Learfield Sports, Texas Rangers, Dallas Cowboys, ESPN Radio, Houston Astros

Ownership
- Owner: Ramar Communications, Inc.
- Sister stations: KLBB-FM; KRBL-FM; KTTU-FM; KXTQ-FM

History
- First air date: November 1, 1946 (79 years ago)
- Former call signs: KSEL (1947–1987); KXTQ (1987–2000); KJTV (2000-2024)
- Call sign meaning: Shares callsign of sister station, KTTU-FM

Technical information
- Licensing authority: FCC
- Facility ID: 55061
- Class: B
- Power: 5,000 watts day 500 watts night
- Translator: 100.7 K264AN (Lubbock)
- Repeater: 97.3 KTTU-HD2 (Lubbock)

Links
- Public license information: Public file; LMS
- Webcast: Listen live
- Website: 1007thescore.com

KTTU (950 AM, "100.7 The Score") is a Lubbock, Texas, radio station broadcasting with a daytime power of 5,000 watts. Programming includes both local and nationally syndicated sports talk shows. It is owned by Ramar Communications Inc., co-owned with several sister radio stations. Its studios are located at 620 Avenue O in downtown Lubbock, and its transmitter is in Mackenzie Park east of downtown.

== History ==
KSEL (KTTU's original call sign) was the second radio station established in Lubbock, signing on in November 1, 1946. KCBD 1590 was third in 1949 and KFYO was the first, established in Lubbock in 1932.

As KSEL, the station's towers were damaged in the 1970 Lubbock Tornado and repaired months later. Over the decades, a studio building at 904 East Broadway was the home to different radio stations at various times, including KSEL (AM) & FM, KXTQ (AM) & FM, and KLLL (AM) & FM. In the early 2000s, the final pair of stations to occupy the studio building were KJTV (AM) & KXTQ-FM. They moved to the KJTV-TV studio building at 98th & University and the 904 East Broadway studio building burned down circa 2003.

In late 1999, the then-KXTQ-AM ended its simulcast of co-owned Magic 93.7 KXTQ-FM, changed its call sign to KJTV and debuted a News/Talk/Sports format. The new format's morning show was originally hosted by Jeff Klotzman and Jane Prince-Jones with Mike Stephens anchoring news. "News Radio 950" also simulcast sister-station FOX 34's News @ 9 newscasts, aired the Associated Press' nationally syndicated All-News news-wheel, Dallas Cowboys games, and for the 2000 season- Texas Tech Red Raider Baseball. Klotzman also served as the News Director and main anchor for FOX 34 News @ 9 while he hosted the morning show.

In March 2001, the then-KJTV began airing Texas Rangers games as part of an expanded affiliation with the KRLD-based Texas State Network. Chuck Heinz and Wendy Willis-Roberts also took over the morning show and the station's name changed to "FOX News 950".

On September 10, 2001, KJTV was a part of the original affiliates for the debut of the Sean Hannity Show. KJTV aired the Sean Hannity Show through May 2003 before the show moved in Lubbock to KFYO.

In June 2002, Ryan Hyatt and Don Williams brought the "Williams & Hyatt Show" to KJTV, leaving KKAM. The show expanded to three hours, airing weekdays 4pm-7pm. Scott Fitzgerald also left KKAM to become their full-time producer. Williams & Hyatt would leave KJTV in July 2004, returning to KKAM in November 2004. Meanwhile, Jeff Klotzman re-added radio duties following Williams & Hyatt's departure, taking over the 4pm-6pm timeslot with a News/Talk afternoon show.

In the fall of 2007, Chris Level and Robert Giovanetti joined RAMAR and created "Tech Talk", sports/talk show focused on Texas Tech Athletics. The show originally aired weekdays from 12pm-1pm, and quickly expanded to 11am-1pm. It moved to Double T 104.3 in late 2009.

In August 2009, KJTV began airing Texas Tech Football, Red Raider Basketball, select Lady Raider Basketball, and select Red Raider Baseball games as part of RAMAR's Double T 104.3 becoming the flagship radio station for Texas Tech sports.

In 2010, Ramar Communications purchased FM translator K264AN (100.7 FM) and began simulcasting Fox Talk 950, as permitted under new FCC rules passed in 2009.

On July 1, 2013, KJTV was re-branded as "AM 950/100.7 FM Lubbock's News, Talk, Sports". News/Talk and Ag programming aired seven days a week from Midnight-3p, with NBC Sports Radio and sports play-by-play airing from 3p-Midnight, seven days a week. From 1999 to 2017 local talk hosts at various times on KJTV included: Jeff Klotzman, Dave King, current Lubbock County Judge Curtis Parrish, current Lubbock County Treasurer Chris Winn, Jane Prince-Jones, Chuck Heinz, Wendy Wills (Roberts), Matt Ernst, and Ag Director Eddie Griffiths.

On August 7, 2017, KJTV flipped formats from news/talk/sports to all-sports, debuting the branding of "100.7 The Score". Programming includes local shows from Double T 97.3 hosts and national shows from a variety of networks including ESPN Radio, NBC Sports Radio and Sports Byline USA. As of 2023, KJTV's national sports affiliations included ESPN Radio, CBS Sports Radio and WestwoodOne Sports.

On July 2, 2024, the station's call sign was changed from KJTV to KTTU, to match sister-station Double T 97.3's call sign. It also added a simulcast on 97.3's HD-2 channel. Later that month, Chris Sizemore left Ramar Communications and Rob Snyder joined Ramar as Engineering Manager after a two-year stint at KLBK-TV.

== FM Translator ==
KTTU (AM) uses the FM translator frequency as the main frequency in the logo; the translator is used to widen the broadcast area and to give listeners the ability to listen to the station on FM.

Broadcast translator for KTTU (AM)
Call sign	Frequency	City of license	FID	ERP (W)	HAAT	Class	FCC info
K264AN	100.7 FM	Lubbock, Texas	148781	99	209 m (686 ft)	D	LMS
