= KLBB-FM =

Coordinates: 33.308°N 101.522°W

Lubbock, Texas; United States
- Broadcast area: Lubbock, Texas
- Frequency: 93.7 MHz
- Branding: 93.7 The Eagle

Programming
- Format: Classic hits

Ownership
- Owner: Ramar Communications, Inc.
- Sister stations: KRBL-FM; KTTU-AM; KTTU-FM; KXTQ-FM

History
- First air date: 1963 (as KSEL-FM)
- Former call signs: KSEL-FM (1963−1987); KKIK (1987−1993); KXTQ-FM (1993–2015)
- Call sign meaning: "Lubbock" also the local airport code

Technical information
- Licensing authority: FCC
- Facility ID: 55062
- Class: C1
- ERP: 100,000 watts
- HAAT: 226 meters (741 ft)

Links
- Public license information: Public file; LMS
- Webcast: Listen live
- Website: 937theeagle.com

KLBB-FM (93.7 MHz) is a radio station serving the Lubbock area. It is owned by Ramar Communications Inc., where its studio is based in south Lubbock. Its transmitter is southeast of Slaton, Texas.

== History ==
It began in 1963 as KSEL-FM. It was on and off several times through the decade. In 1958, the station was sold to an investor group that included George H.W. Bush. KSEL-FM was sold at the same time to station employees Rochestor, Kyle, and Henderson and renamed KRKH-FM. Power was 9,600 watts at 155 ft from one of the towers at 904 East Broadway (the KSEL AM towers).

KRKH and KSEL (AM) came back under common ownership in 1961, when the stations were acquired by one-time state representative R.B. "Mac" McAlister and his son, future Lubbock mayor Bill McAlister. KRKH-FM was renamed KSEL-FM. Its power was increased to 100,000 watts and height increased to 736 ft from the 84th and L tower of KAMC (TV).

Formats included Big Band and Standards in the early '60s (including host Misty Fincher), rock music in the late '60s, Drake Chenault's Great American Country in the early '70s, TM Stereo Rock from 1977 to 1981; local adult contemporary until 1987, when calls changed to KKIK and format went to country. After a bankruptcy in the late 1980s, the stations were sold to Ramar Communications. A short while later, the format changed to Tejano music. The station changed its call sign to KXTQ-FM on November 1, 1993.

On December 18, 2015 at 10 a.m., as part of a five-way radio station swap, Magic's Tejano format moved to 106.5 FM KXTQ-FM (formerly KEJS-FM) and 93.7 adopted KLBB-FM's classic hits format as "93.7 The Eagle". To support the format change, the station changed its call sign to KLBB-FM on December 29, 2015.
